= War of Qi's succession =

Dynastic conflict in the state of Qi (643–642 BCE)

- Part of the Spring and Autumn period
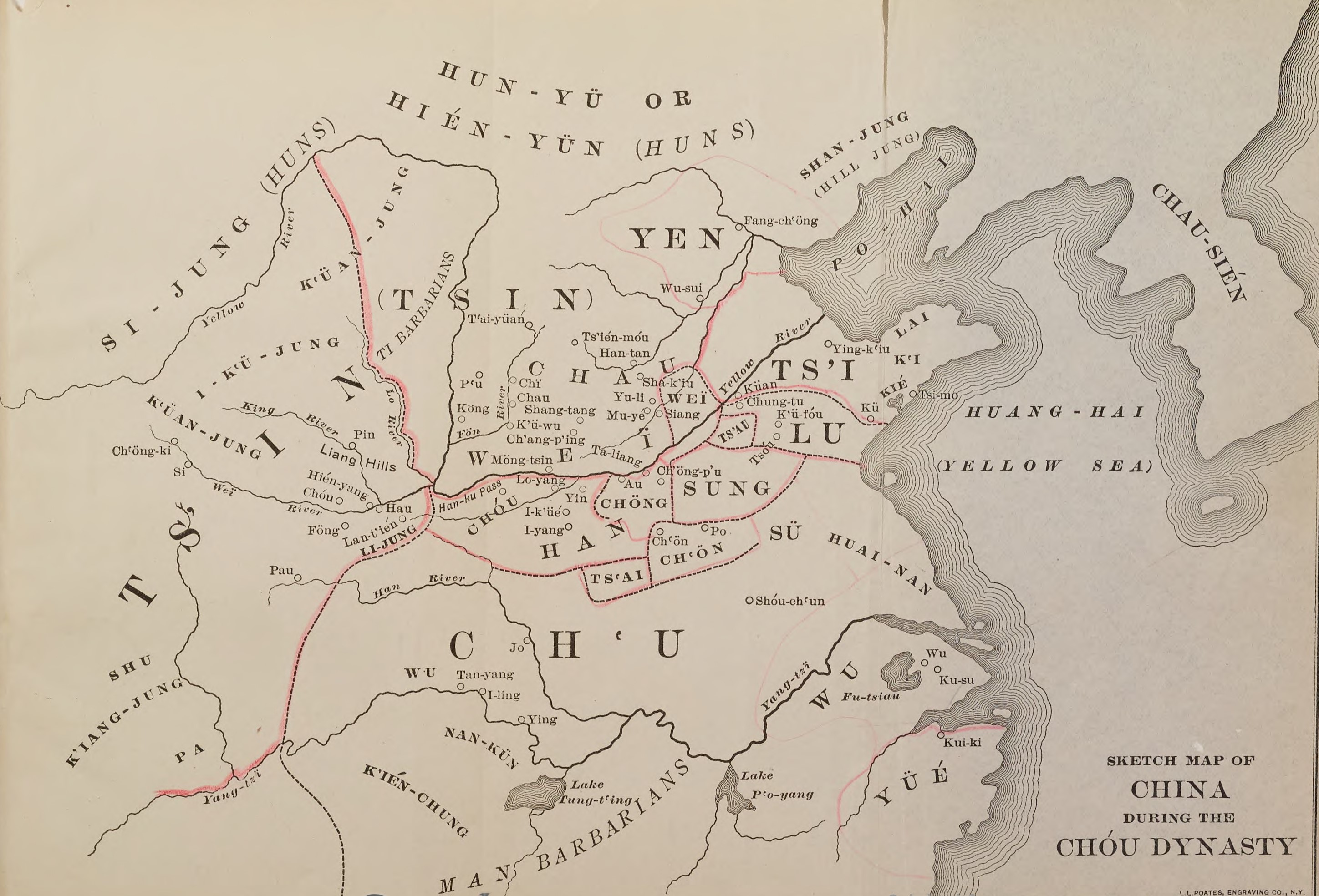
- Map of China during the Zhou; Qi is labelled "TS'I"
Date	643–642 BC
Location	State of Qi
Status	Victory of Prince Zhao; Death of Wukui, exile of the other rival claimants; Succession crisis in Qi continues

Belligerents
Faction of Prince Zhao Supported by: Song, Cao, Wey, Zou	Faction of Prince Wukui Supported by: Lu	Factions of Pan, Shangren, Yuan, and Yong Supported by: Beidi

Commanders and leaders
Prince Zhao; Duke Xiang of Song	Prince Wukui †	Prince Pan; Prince Shangren; Prince Yuan; Prince Yong

The war of Qi's succession was a civil war in the State of Qi from 643 to 642 BCE, as the sons of Duke Huan of Qi fought against each other for the throne. Their struggle led to chaos in Qi and the intervention of several outside powers, until Duke Huan's intended heir, Prince Zhao (later known as Duke Xiao), emerged victorious. Nevertheless, four of Prince Zhao's rival brothers remained at large and continued to conspire for the throne, leading to a succession crisis that plagued Qi for decades. As a result, the succession war and its consequences greatly weakened Qi, which lost its status as China's predominant state.

== Background ==
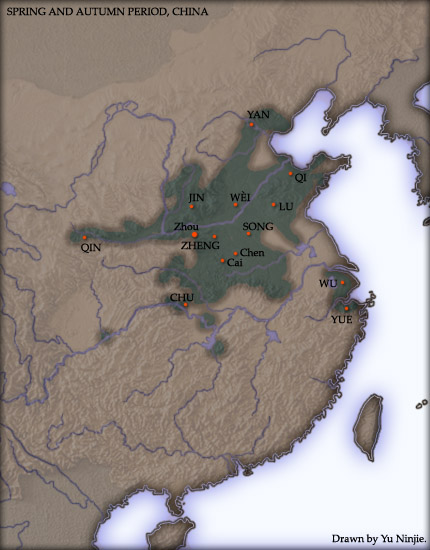
Map showing the most important states of the Spring and Autumn period

The state of Qi was a regionally powerful polity during the Western Zhou period (1046–771 BC), and as the Zhou dynasty's authority collapsed at the Spring and Autumn period's beginning, Qi grew into the dominating power of eastern China. As result, Qi was in an ideal position to expand its influence when Zheng's short-lived dominance over China declined. Nevertheless, Qi's development into China's predominant state was not just because of this favorable situation, but due to the efforts of two highly capable individuals: Duke Huan and his chancellor and advisor Guan Zhong. Under their leadership, Qi was reformed and became primus inter pares among the Chinese states, with Duke Huan rising to Hegemon of China. Toward the end of Huan's long reign (685–643 BC), however, Qi's dominance began to crumble. A military alliance led by Qi failed to stop the growth of the expansionist state of Chu, and even suffered defeat against it during the Battle of Loulin. Duke Huan's authority over the other states declined, a development accelerated by Guan Zhong's death in 645 BC. Having grown ill, the elderly duke also proved to be no longer able to keep the various political factions in his own realm under control.

These factions were led by six of his sons: Zhao, Wukui, Pan, Shangren, Yuan, and Yong. Since all of them were the children of different concubines instead of Duke Huan's three main wives (who bore him no sons), each of these six considered himself entitled to the throne. The officially designated heir was Prince Zhao, and Duke Huan and Guan Zhong even charged the ruler of neighboring Song, Duke Xiang to ensure his succession. With Guan Zhong's death and the old duke of Qi's health worsening, however, Wukui, Pan, Shangren, Yuan, and Yong increasingly voiced their opposition to Zhao's position as designated heir. Their pleas to make one of them the next ruler failed to sway Duke Huan, but he could not prevent them from plotting against each other. In consequence, the brothers gathered followers and prepared for the inevitable showdown between them.

== Civil war ==
=== Wukui's ascendancy and chaos ===
Duke Huan finally died in late 643 BC. According to the Guanzi and some other texts from the Warring States period, he was starved to death by four conspiring officials. Other notable sources for these events, such as the Zuo Zhuan and the Records of the Grand Historian, do not mention this. With the duke dead, the situation at the court escalated. The factions of crown prince Zhao and his rival brothers all took up arms against each other, and the capital city of Linzi descended into violent chaos. Wukui, however, had two powerful allies at the court: Diao, chief of the eunuchs, and Wu (also called Yiya), the chief cook. The Guanzi claims these two were among the conspirators who murdered Duke Huan. A party led by Diao and Wu managed to take control of the palace and murdered all rival officials they could capture; the other princes fled for their lives. On 11 November 643 BC, Wukui was crowned the new duke of Qi. Only then was the late Duke Huan finally encoffined; according to different accounts his corpse had laid unattended in his bedchamber for between seven days and three months due to the prevailing chaos, and already began to rot. (Note: The Guanzi claims his corpse was left to rot for seven or eleven days. Both the Zuo Zhuan as well as the Records of the Grand Historian report sixty-seven days, while the Han Feizi record three months. Whatever number was correct, historians have noted that it was customary to prepare the corpse for burial during the day. In Duke Huan's case, however, the ceremony took place in the night, which "clearly indicates that the situation was anomalous".)

Despite his coronation, however, Wukui's rule proved far from secure. While Pan, Shangren, Yuan, and Yong all remained at large, it was Zhao who presented the greatest threat as he had fled to Duke Xiang of Song and asked for assistance. The ruler of Song promptly assembled an alliance against Wukui, consisting of Song, Cao, Wey, and Zou. The armies of these states, led by Duke Xiang and Prince Zhao, proceeded to invade Qi in March 642 BC. Wukui, on the other side, had won the support of the state of Lu, which sent an expeditionary army in order to aid him against the invaders. In the end, however, Wukui was murdered before the conflict could be decided on the battlefield. Growing fearful upon hearing about the Song-led invasion, the people of Qi revolted and put the usurper to death so that they could to welcome Prince Zhao as new duke.

=== Battle of Yan ===
Map of Shandong showing the location of Qi's capital Linzi and the battlefield of Yan.

As the news about Wukui's death spread, it was assumed that Zhao's ascendancy to throne had become inevitable, whereupon Cao, Wey and Lu withdrew their armies from Qi. In truth, however, the crown prince's position was not yet secured: As he was about to be enthroned by the people in the capital, Pan, Shangren, Yuan, and Yong returned with their adherents and attacked his party. Thus, Zhao was again forced to escape from Linzi as his rival brothers took control of the government and formed an alliance against him. The crown prince fled to Duke Xiang of Song who still remained in Qi with his army, and requested his help. Meanwhile, the united army of the four brothers sallied forth from Linzi in order to drive the troops of Song from Qi. The two forces met on the battlefield at Yan (modern-day Licheng District, Jinan), where the army of Song won a decisive victory. The four brothers fled from Qi, while Duke Xiang of Song enthroned Zhao at Linzi; from then on, Zhao became known as Duke Xiao of Qi. With the succession war seemingly concluded, the army of Song returned home.

Pan, Shangren, Yuan, and Yong were still active, however, and continued to conspire against the newly crowned duke. Soon after their defeat at Yan, the Beidi invaded and ravaged Qi, probably in order to aid the four brothers. This was not enough to weaken Duke Xiao, however, and Qi was restabilized. Soon after the Beidi attack, the situation had become calm enough for late Duke Huan to be finally buried with a proper ceremony, months after his death.

== Aftermath ==
After his ascendancy to the throne, Duke Xiao attempted to restore Qi's former predominance in China. This led to a rift in his relationship with Duke Xiang of Song, as he too wanted to become hegemon. Though the two former allies even went to war over this issue, both failed in their efforts and Duke Wen of Jin became the next hegemon. Duke Xiao's line would also not last on Qi's throne, as his son and heir was murdered. The succession crisis thus continued until Prince Yuan took the throne in 608 BC. His descendants would rule Qi until 386 BC, when they were toppled by the Tian clan.

== Bibliography ==
- Hsu, Cho-yun (1999). "The Spring and Autumn Period". In Michael Loewe; Edward L. Shaughnessy (eds.). The Cambridge History of ancient China – From the Origins of Civilization to 221 B.C. Cambridge: Cambridge University Press. pp. 545–586. ISBN 9780521470308.
- Cook, Constance A.; Major, John S. (1999). Defining Chu: Image And Reality In Ancient China. Honolulu: University of Hawaii Press. ISBN 0-8248-2905-0.
- Rickett, W. Allyn (2001). Guanzi: Political, Economic, and Philosophical Essays from Early China. Boston: Cheng & Tsui Company. ISBN 0-88727-324-6.
- Sima Qian (2006). William H. Nienhauser, Jr. (ed.). The Grand Scribe's Records: The Hereditary Houses of Pre-Han China, Part 1. Bloomington, Indiana: Indiana University Press. ISBN 0-253-34025-X.
- Zuo Qiuming (2015). Harry Miller (ed.). The Gongyang Commentary on The Spring and Autumn Annals: A Full Translation. New York City: Palgrave Macmillan. ISBN 978-1137497635.
