= Duke Zhao of Qi =

Duke Zhao of Qi 齊昭公

Duke of Qi
- Reign: 632–613 BC
- Predecessor: Duke Xiao
- Successor: Lü She
- Died: 613 BC
- Spouse: Zi Shu Ji (子叔姬)
- Issue: Lü She
Names
- Ancestral name: Jiāng (姜); Clan name: Lǚ (呂); Given name: Pān (潘)
Posthumous name
- Duke Zhao (昭公)
- House: Jiang
- Dynasty: Jiang Qi
- Father: Duke Huan
- Mother: Ge Ying (葛嬴)

Duke Zhao of Qi (Chinese: 齊昭公; pinyin: Qí Zhāo Gōng), personal name Lü Pan, was the 19th ruler of the Jiang Qi state from 632 BC until his death in 613 BC.

== Accession to the throne ==
Duke Zhao's father was Duke Huan of Qi, who was the first of the Five Hegemons, the most powerful rulers of the Spring and Autumn period. Duke Huan had at least three main wives who bore no sons, six favoured concubines, and more than ten sons. Duke Zhao was then known as Prince Pan, and his mother was Ge Ying, a princess of the minor state of Ge (葛). Five other sons of Duke Huan also contended for the throne: Prince Wukui, Crown Prince Zhao (later Duke Xiao), Prince Shangren (later Duke Yi), Prince Yuan (later Duke Hui), and Prince Yong.

When Duke Huan died in the tenth month of 643 BC, the six princes fought one another for the throne. Wukui prevailed at first, but he sat on the throne for only three months before being killed by supporters of Crown Prince Zhao. Prince Zhao ascended the throne with the help of Duke Xiang of Song and was known as Duke Xiao of Qi.

Duke Xiao reigned for ten years. After he died in 633 BC, Prince Kaifang of Wey, who had been a trusted official of Duke Huan, killed Duke Xiao's son and helped Prince Pan usurp the throne. Prince Pan is posthumously known as Duke Zhao of Qi.

== Reign and succession ==
In 632 BC, Duke Wen of Jin defeated the State of Chu at the Battle of Chengpu, and was declared the Hegemon of China, a title that was previously held by Duke Zhao's father Duke Huan.

In 627 BC, the sixth year of Duke Zhao's reign, the Di tribes invaded Qi.

In the fifth month of 613 BC, Duke Zhao died and was succeeded by his son She. However, just two months later She was murdered by Duke Zhao's younger brother Shangren, who usurped the throne and was posthumously known as Duke Yì of Qi.

== Family ==
Wives:

- Zi Shu Ji, of the Ji clan (子叔姬 姬姓), the mother of Prince She

Sons:

- Prince She (公子舍; d. 613 BC), ruled as the Duke of Qi in 613 BC

Duke Zhao of Qi House of Jiang Died: 613 BC
Regnal titles
Preceded by Duke Xiao of Qi	Duke of Qi; 632–613 BC	Succeeded by She
