= Battle of Loulin =

645 BC battle in China

- Part of the Xu–Chu wars and the Qi–Chu wars
Date	Winter 645 BC
Location	Loulin (present-day Fengyang County, Anhui) 32.866667°N 117.566667°E
Result	Chu victory

Belligerents
Xu; Supported by: Qi, Lu, Song, Chen, Wey, Zheng, Cao, Xǔ (Note: Not to be confused with Xu (徐), Xǔ (許) was a small state at present-day Xuchang.)	Chu

Commanders and leaders
Gongsu Ao (Lu commander); Several unknown commanders	Unknown Chu commander
- Location within China

The Battle of Loulin was fought in Winter 645 BC between the states of Chu and Xu, the latter being supported by a coalition of northern states led by Qi. Xu, originally the most powerful state of the Huai River valley, had been weakened by internal unrest and several wars since the beginning of the Spring and Autumn period. As its influence over eastern Hubei, southern Henan and central Anhui waned, Chu began to expand into these regions. Threatened by these developments, Xu joined an alliance of several northern states against Chu. In spring 645 BC, when Chu invaded Xu's southern heartland, the northern states sent a relief expedition in order to aid Xu and stop Chu's eastern conquests. The coalition forces eventually met Chu's army at Loulin and were defeated, marking the beginning of Xu's final decline and accelerating the end of Qi's hegemony over China.

== Prelude ==
The state of Xu, centered in northern Anhui, had controlled most of the middle and lower Huai River during the Western Zhou and early Spring and Autumn period. Beginning in the late 8th century BC, however, Xu's power began to wane, and several of its vassals and territories seceded. At the same time, the state of Chu in eastern Hubei rose in prominence.

After it had conquered most of the Nanyang Basin in 678 BC, Chu began to advance further east into the Upper Huai River valley and north into the Yangtze plain. In just twenty years, it overrun many neighboring states and forced others into vassalage. Troubled by Chu's growing power, the hegemon of China, Duke Huan of Qi, began to organize a major alliance to invade Chu and end its expansion. Coinciding with the formation of the anti-Chu alliance, Xu occupied the state of Shu in modern-day Lujiang County in 656 BC. Li Lian, a Yuan dynasty scholar, considered it likely that Shu had been an ally of Chu and Xu had taken it in coordination with Qi. According to this view, the destruction of Shu was part of the preparation for the planned invasion of Chu by the northern alliance. The Kangxi Dictionary editors found this theory reasonable. In this case, the occupation of Shu marked the beginning of hostilities between Chu and Xu, the latter acting in accordance with Qi. In 655 BC, Qi launched its invasion of Chu together with Song, Chen, Wey, Zheng, Xǔ, and Cao. The offensive quickly stalled, however, and the alliance was unable to weaken Chu. A non-aggression pact was concluded, whose only consequence was that Chu decided to expand further into the Huai River valley instead of attacking the northern states again. Consequently, it began to expand more aggressively into Xu's sphere of influence and conquered several small Huai states.

Among these were also several local allies of Qi, such as Huang. That the old hegemon proved unable to protect its allies made clear that Qi's power waned.

Thus, just before the war of 645 BC, the situation of the anti-Chu alliance was already problematic. Its strongest member state, Qi, had lost much of its military power and influence during the preceding years, and if the Gongyang Zhuan is to be believed, there had even been a war among the alliance members directly before the outbreak of hostilities with Chu. Two coalition members, Wey and Zheng had also suffered from Di raids. Consequently, the anti-Chu forces were weakened, while Chu was on the rise in regard of its political and military power.

== Campaigns against Chu and battle ==
In spring 645 BC, Chu finally invaded Xu. According to the Zuo Zhuan, the invasion was a retaliation for the destruction of Shu and the related alliance between Xu and the northern states. In response to the Chu offensive, Duke Huan of Qi had a meeting with the rulers of Lu, Song, Chen, Wey, Zheng, Cao, and Xǔ at Muqiu, near present-day Liaocheng, to reaffirm their anti-Chu alliance and plan a relief expedition for Xu. They consequently organized an army at Kuang, modern-day Daming, consisting of contingents sent by the alliance states. Each contingent was commanded by its own officer, the one of Lu led Gongsu Ao. Also known as Meng Mubo, he was a senior official of Lu, the son of Prince Qingfu and grandson of Duke Huan of Lu. From Kuang, the united forces marched to Xu. Such a relief expedition was far from unprecedented, as Duke Huan of Qi had already aided many states during his hegemony.

In autumn, armies from Qi and Cao also invaded the state of Li in present-day Suizhou. In attacking Li, a vassal state of Chu, they attempted to create a diversion in favour of Xu. However, Chu forces remained active in Xu, while tension among the coalition began to rise. The following winter, these tensions escalated as Song invaded Cao even though the two were still part of the formal alliance. This war further undermined the relief expedition, and showcased that Qi had lost its control over the alliance members. As the coalition fell apart, Chu finally confronted the Xu forces at Loulin in present-day Fengyang County.

Very little is known about the battle itself, besides the fact that Chu defeated the Xu army. The Zuo Zhuan only comments that Xu was defeated because it relied too heavily on its allies' support. Nevertheless, Chu's victory was apparently not total, as Xu remained independent and allied with Qi for the time being.

== Aftermath ==
While the Battle of Loulin was not responsible for the end of Qi's hegemony and Xu's decline, it accelerated both. The infighting among the Qi-led coalition showed that Duke Huan had no longer control over the other states, further reducing his prestige and authority. After Loulin, he could no longer organize any united efforts among the Chinese states, and the relief expedition for Xu was the last time he attempted to save a state threatened by invaders. As chancellor Guan Zhong, architect of Qi's hegemony, had also died in 645 BC, the state of Qi itself began to fall into disorder. Duke Huan aided Xu in one last counter-offensive against Chu in 643 BC. Qi and Xu invaded Yingshi in Lu'an, a vassal state of Chu, in order "to avenge (...) the defeat of Xu by Chu at Loulin". Later that year, Duke Huan died, possibly murdered by his advisors, and Qi descended into a civil war.

Its victory over Xu and Qi's alliance at Loulin, on the other side, allowed Chu to continue its eastern expansion. It consequently conquered most of the western and middle Huai River valley during the following decades. As result, Chu replaced Xu as the dominant state of the eastern Huai River valley for good. Furthermore, Xu, weakened by its defeat at Loulin, was also increasingly eclipsed by the neighboring state Zhongli. Pressured by both Chu as well as Zhongli, Xu was reduced to its heartland and eventually fell under Chu's dominance, becoming one of the latter's vassal states.

== Bibliography ==
- Zuo Qiuming (2015). Harry Miller (ed.). The Gongyang Commentary on The Spring and Autumn Annals: A Full Translation. New York City: Palgrave Macmillan. ISBN 978-1137497635.
- Cook, Constance A.; Major, John S. (1999). Defining Chu: Image And Reality In Ancient China. Honolulu: University of Hawaii Press. ISBN 0-8248-2905-0.
- Shaughnessy, Edward L. (1999). "Western Zhou History". In Michael Loewe; Edward L. Shaughnessy (eds.). The Cambridge History of ancient China – From the Origins of Civilization to 221 B.C. Cambridge, New York City, Melbourne, et al.: Cambridge University Press. pp. 292–351. ISBN 0-521-47030-7.
- Hsu, Cho-yun (1999). "The Spring and Autumn period". In Michael Loewe; Edward L. Shaughnessy (eds.). The Cambridge History of ancient China – From the Origins of Civilization to 221 B.C. Cambridge, New York City, Melbourne, et al.: Cambridge University Press. pp. 545–586. ISBN 0-521-47030-7.
- Guan Zhong (2001). W. Allyn Rickett (ed.). Guanzi: Political, Economic, and Philosophical Essays from Early China. Boston: Cheng & Tsui Company. ISBN 0-88727-324-6.
- Anhui Provincial Institute of Cultural Relics and Archaeology and Bengbu Museum (June 2015). "The Excavation of the tomb of Bai, Lord of the Zhongli State". Chinese Archaeology. 14 (1). Berlin, Boston: Walter de Gruyter: 62–85. doi:10.1515/char-2014-0008.
- Kan, Xuhang; Zhou, Qun; Qian, Renfa (2009). Niclas Vogt (ed.). "Spring and Autumn Tomb No. 1 at Shuangdun, Bengbu City, Anhui". Kaogu 考古 (Archaeology). 10 (7): 62–85.
