= Duke Hui of Qi =

Duke Hui of Qi 齊惠公

Duke of Qi
- Reign: 608–599 BC
- Predecessor: Duke Yi
- Successor: Duke Qing
- Died: 599 BC
- Spouse: Xiao Tong Shu Zi (蕭同叔子)
- Issue: Duke Qing
Names
- Ancestral name: Jiāng (姜); Clan name: Lǚ (呂); Given name: Yuán (元)
Posthumous name
- Duke Hui (惠公)
- House: Jiang
- Dynasty: Jiang Qi
- Father: Duke Huan
- Mother: Shao Wey Ji (少衛姬)

Duke Hui of Qi (Chinese: 齊惠公; pinyin: Qí Huì Gōng), personal name Lü Yuan, was the 22nd ruler of the Jiang Qi state from 608 BC until his death in 599 BC.

== Accession to the throne ==
Duke Hui's father was Duke Huan of Qi, who was the first of the Five Hegemons, the most powerful rulers of the Spring and Autumn period. Duke Huan had at least three main wives who bore no sons, six favoured concubines, and more than ten sons. Duke Hui was then known as Prince Yuan, and his mother was the younger Wey Ji, one of two princesses of the State of Wey who were among Duke Huan's favoured concubines. Five other sons of Duke Huan also contended for the throne: Prince Wukui, Crown Prince Zhao (later Duke Xiao), Prince Pan (later Duke Zhao), Prince Shangren (later Duke Yì), and Prince Yong.

When Duke Huan died in the tenth month of 643 BC, the six princes fought one another for the throne. Wukui, the son of the elder Wey Ji, prevailed at first, but was killed three months later and replaced by Duke Xiao. Duke Xiao died after ten years of reign, and was succeeded by Duke Zhao whose supporters killed Duke Xiao's son. When Duke Zhao died in 613 BC, his son She ascended the throne, but was soon murdered by his uncle Duke Yì.

Duke Yì reigned for four years before being killed by Bing Chu (邴歜) and Yan Zhi (閻職) in 609 BC. The ministers of Qi deposed Duke Yì's son and installed his brother Prince Yuan, who was then exiled in the State of Wey, on the throne. Prince Yuan, posthumously known as Duke Hui of Qi, was the last of the five sons of Duke Huan to ascend the Qi throne.

== Reign and succession ==
In 607 BC, the second year of Duke Hui's reign, the Long Di tribes invaded Qi. Qi general Wangzi Chengfu (王子城父) defeated the invaders and killed their leader Rongru (榮如).

Duke Hui reigned for ten years and died in 599 BC. He was succeeded by his son Wuye, Duke Qing of Qi. Duke Hui favoured the official Cui Zhu (崔杼). After Duke Hui's death the powerful Gao and Guo clans of Qi expelled Cui, who fled to the State of Wey. Cui would later return to Qi and cause great turmoil in the state.

== Family ==
Wives:

- Xiao Tong Shu Zi, of the Zi clan (蕭桐叔子 子姓), the mother of Prince Wuye

Sons:

- Prince Wuye (公子無野; d. 582 BC), ruled as Duke Qing of Qi from 598–582 BC

Duke Hui of Qi House of Jiang Died: 599 BC
Regnal titles
Preceded by Duke Yì of Qi	Duke of Qi; 608–599 BC	Succeeded by Duke Qing of Qi
