= Wukui =

Lü Wukui 呂無虧

Ruler of Qi
- Reign: 642 BC
- Predecessor: Duke Huan
- Successor: Duke Xiao
- Died: 642 BC
Names
- Ancestral name: Jiāng (姜); Clan name: Lǚ (呂); Given name: Wúkuī (無虧) or Wúguǐ (無詭)
- House: Jiang
- Dynasty: Jiang Qi
- Father: Duke Huan
- Mother: Wey Gong Ji

Lü Wukui (Chinese: 呂無虧; pinyin: Lǚ Wúkuī) was the 17th ruler of the Jiang Qi state for three months until his death in 642 BC. He was succeeded by his younger brother, Duke Xiao.

== Accession to the throne ==
Wukui's father and predecessor was Duke Huan of Qi, who was the first of the Five Hegemons, the most powerful rulers of the Spring and Autumn period. Duke Huan had at least three main wives who bore no sons, six favoured concubines, and more than ten sons. Wukui's mother was the elder Wey Ji, one of the two princesses of the State of Wey who were among Duke Huan's favoured concubines. However, the crown prince of Qi was Prince Zhao (later Duke Xiao), who was born to Zheng Ji, a princess of the State of Zheng. Four other sons of Duke Huan also contended for the throne: Prince Pan (later Duke Zhao), Prince Shangren (later Duke Yi), Prince Yuan (later Duke Hui), and Prince Yong.

When Duke Huan died in the tenth month of 643 BC, the six princes fought each other for the throne. After two months of fighting Wukui prevailed and ascended the throne in the twelfth month. Crown Prince Zhao fled to the State of Song. During the unrest Duke Huan's corpse lay unattended for 67 days, and became so badly decomposed that worms crawled out of his room.

== Death ==
Wukui sat on the throne for only three months before being killed. In the third month of 642 BC, Crown Prince Zhao, the legal heir of Duke Huan, returned with the army of Duke Xiang of Song. The people of Qi killed Wukui and intended to install Prince Zhao on the throne, but the supporters of the other four princes attacked and drove Prince Zhao back to the State of Song. Two months later, the Song army returned and defeated the forces of the four princes, and Crown Prince Zhao finally ascended the throne, to be known as Duke Xiao of Qi.

Wukui House of Jiang Died: 642 BC
Regnal titles
Preceded by Duke Huan of Qi	Duke of Qi; 642 BC	Succeeded by Duke Xiao of Qi
