= Interstate relations during the Spring and Autumn period =

Conduct of relations among ancient Chinese states

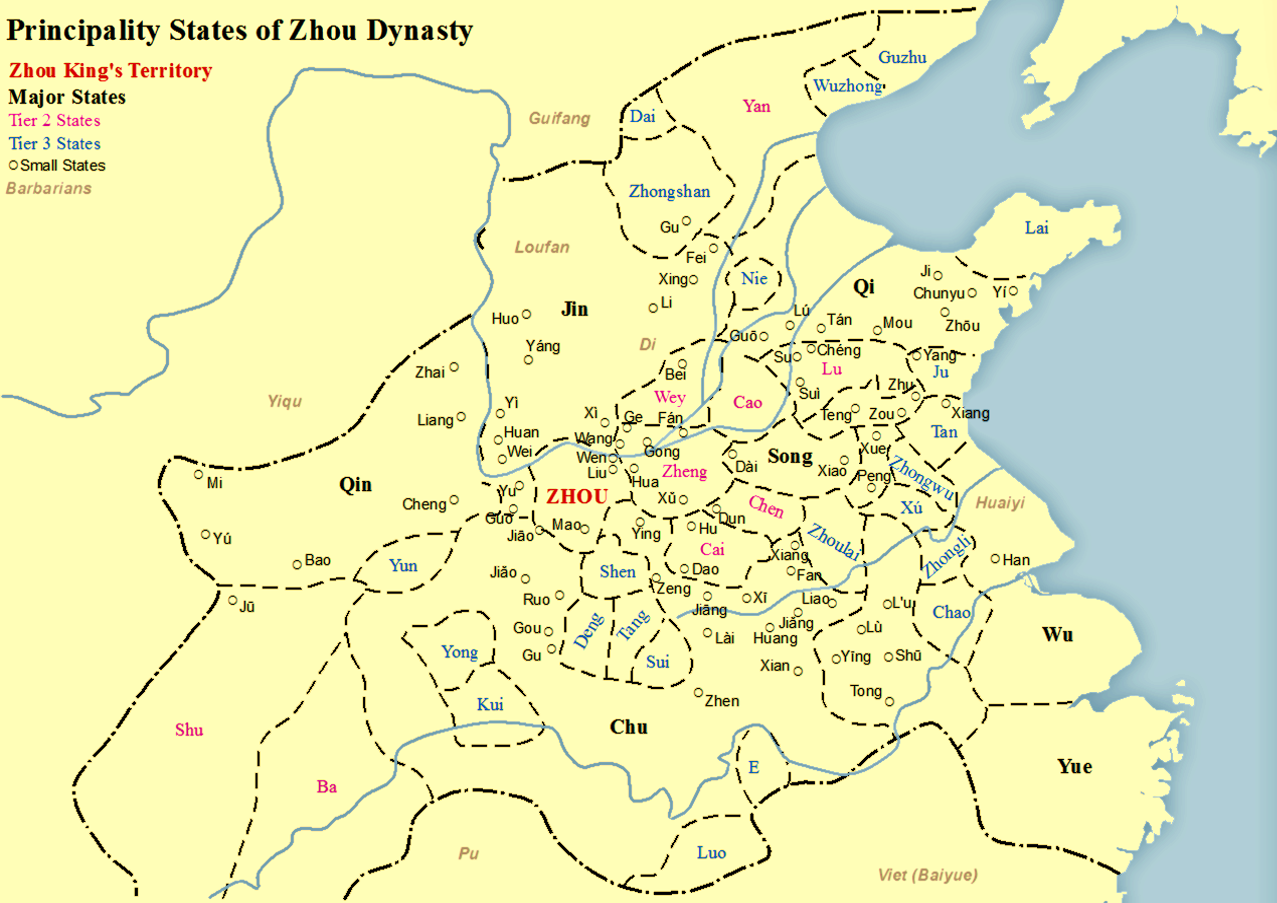
Map of major States of Zhou Dynasty

Certain patterns emerged to govern the conduct of relations among the states of the Spring and Autumn period of ancient China. These patterns constituted a rudimentary system of interstate or international law based on the model of feudalism established under the Western Zhou dynasty. The norms of interstate relations during the Spring and Autumn period was one of the earliest systems of interstate relations and international law in the world. It was of importance in the early cultural and political development of China, allowing greater ease in maintaining relations, and facilitating the flow of trade and information. There was a growing body of customary international law which developed as contacts and commerce increased, a number of treaties were signed, and the appeal was frequently made to rules set up within the leagues of states. A great many of the canons of interstate law concerned diplomacy among the states.

Interstate relations originated in the feudal system of the Western Zhou, whereby leaders of the states were granted hierarchical titles from the King of Zhou, who also held the title of Son of Heaven. Within a few years after the beginning of the Spring and Autumn period, these ranks lost their practical significance. Diplomacy came to be dictated by the security interests of the states rather than by ceremony. Although the Zhou king remained the supreme ritual office through this period, royal representatives were sidelined at interstate conferences.

The institution of hegemon (霸), created to designate the one privileged to command campaigns on behalf of the Zhou king, helped to stabilize the Zhou ecumene in the 7th and 6th centuries BC and unify the states against invading tribes. The interstate conferences convened by the hegemons helped to maintain peace, such as the four decades-long truce between the states after the Shangqiu conference in 546 BC. The hegemon order declined with the rise of the southern peripheral kingdoms of Wu and Yue in 500 BC. Although the Zhou royal institutions had become politically impotent, there was little attempt to alter the political thought underpinning the state system until the late 6th century BC. For much of the Spring and Autumn period, interstate politics were somewhat overshadowed by the internal conflicts within states, among the aristocratic lineages and the state rulers.

== Conduct of diplomacy ==
Ancient sources such as the Zuo Zhuan and Chunqiu record the various diplomatic activities under such terms as chao (朝), a court visit paid by a lesser ruler to another; hui (會), meetings of officials or nobles of different states; pin (聘), missions of friendly inquiries sent by the ruler of a greater state to another; shi (使), emissaries sent from one state to another; shou (狩), hunting parties attended by representatives of different states. Notably, tribute offerings were not limited to the Zhou king but also given to a stronger polity as a symbolic consent to the relationship between two polities at different power levels.

In the early years of the Spring and Autumn period, the rulers of the various states were the most important personages in the conduct of external affairs. They soon came to rely on their xingren (行人) or messengers to carry on most of the preliminary work in any matters of importance. These xingren were usually officials of fairly high rank within the state who carried out these commissions on a temporary basis. There were also the ambassadors, shi (使), who carried out more and more of the ceremonial duties of the ruler outside his state. Up until the first half of the Spring and Autumn period, however, the rulers themselves usually had to be present at the signing of any agreements which committed their states to any action. Reflecting the growing importance of external affairs, xiang (相) or chancellors, began taking a more active role in diplomacy. An indication of the growing power of the xiang was that the chancellors of several states were able to repudiate a covenant which had been signed in 506 BC by the rulers of their various states. The culmination of this trend was reached later in the Warring States period, when the establishment of an external policy had become almost the exclusive concern of the chancellors.

With the exception of the states which from time to time assumed the role of leaders, the states in general dealt with each other on a footing of equality.

The interstate system applied to polities that met a standard of civilization; states that transgressed that standard, as defined by Confucian culture, could be 'excommunicated' from the interstate system by being labelled as 'barbarian' and hence no longer eligible for sovereign equal rights.

== Treaties ==
Treaties or covenants, called meng (盟) were the formal documents involved in the relations between states. The term usually refers to the whole of the ceremony by which states joined in a pact, rather than to the pact itself.

After long discussions about the terms of the treaties to be signed, the representatives participated in a solemn ritual in which an animal – usually a calf – was sacrificed at some holy spot outside the walls of a city. The left ear of the sacrificial victim was cut off and it was used to smear with blood both the document bearing the articles of agreement, and the lips of the participants. One copy of the document was buried with the sacrificial beast and each of the signatories kept a copy. The texts of these treaties were couched in brief but solemn language and usually involved three parts: the statement of purpose, the articles of agreement, and an oath invoking the wrath of the most important deities upon anyone who transgressed the agreements. Despite the solemn language and ceremony, treaties were often broken.

Of 140 treaties are recorded in the Chunqiu, more than half are bilateral. Bilateral treaties were concluded for mutual defence, trade, marriage alliance, and for the sake of the traditional friendship between states. With the hegemony of Duke Huan of Qi the states came to rely more upon the meetings of the leagues to settle their problems, and the greater number of the recorded treaties became multilateral. Multilateral treaties often carried more weight with individual states because there were provisions for joint action on the part of the other signatories against any state which violated the provisions. It was only with the decline of Jin power toward the close of the 6th century BC that a system of bilateral alliances again became predominant.

== Alliance systems ==
In general, leagues of states were the most effective means of upholding treaties and the rules of interstate law. The first league of Zhou states was founded in 680 BC. Throughout the next several centuries, two alliance systems existed, that of the Zhou states in the north and the southern states which united under the banner of Chu. Qin was a consistent leader of a league in the west and in the latter half of the Spring and Autumn period, Wu headed a league of states in the southeast. Although when one league confronted another wars became larger in scope, they also occurred less frequently because members were obliged to maintain security and solidarity within their area.
