= Duke Xiao of Qi =

Duke Xiao of Qi 齊孝公

Duke of Qi
- Reign: 642–633 BC
- Predecessor: Lü Wukui
- Successor: Duke Zhao
- Died: 633 BC
Names
- Ancestral name: Jiāng (姜); Clan name: Lǚ (呂); Given name: Zhāo (昭)
Posthumous name
- Duke Xiao (孝公)
- House: Jiang
- Dynasty: Jiang Qi
- Father: Duke Huan
- Mother: Zheng Ji (鄭姬)

Duke Xiao of Qi (Chinese: 齊孝公; pinyin: Qí Xiào Gōng), personal name Lü Zhao, was the 18th ruler of the Jiang Qi state from 642 BC until his death in 633 BC. Succeeding his older brother Lü Wukui to the throne, Duke Xiao reigned from 642 BC to 633 BC, and was in turn succeeded by his younger brother, Duke Zhao.

== Accession to the throne ==
Duke Xiao's father was Duke Huan of Qi, who was the first of the Five Hegemons, the most powerful rulers of the Spring and Autumn period. Duke Huan had at least three main wives who bore no sons, six favoured concubines, and more than ten sons. Duke Xiao was then known as Crown Prince Zhao, and his mother was Zheng Ji, a princess of the State of Zheng. Five other sons of Duke Huan also contended for the throne: Prince Wukui, Prince Pan (later Duke Zhao), Prince Shangren (later Duke Yi), Prince Yuan (later Duke Hui), and Prince Yong.

When Duke Huan died in the tenth month of 643 BC, the six princes fought each other for the throne. After two months of fighting Wukui prevailed and ascended the throne in the twelfth month. Crown Prince Zhao fled to the State of Song. During the unrest Duke Huan's corpse lay unattended for 67 days, and it was so badly decomposed that worms crawled out of his room.

Wukui sat on the throne for only three months before being killed. In the third month of 642 BC, Prince Zhao returned with the army of Duke Xiang of Song. The people of Qi killed Wukui and wanted to install Prince Zhao on the throne, but the supporters of the other four princes attacked and drove Prince Zhao back to the State of Song. Two months later, the Song army returned and defeated the forces of the four princes, and Prince Zhao finally ascended the throne, to be known as Duke Xiao of Qi.

== Reign ==
In 637 BC Duke Xiao held a conference of state leaders in order to reconfirm the hegemony of the state of Qi over the other states. However, Duke Xiang of Song refused to acknowledge Qi's hegemony as he aspired to be the hegemon himself. Duke Xiao attacked Song to punish Duke Xiang's disobedience, even though it was Duke Xiang of Song who helped him ascend the throne six years before.

Duke Xiao reigned for ten years. After he died in 633 BC, Prince Kaifang (開方) of Wey, who had been a trusted official of Duke Huan, killed Duke Xiao's son and helped Prince Pan usurp the throne. Prince Pan is posthumously known as Duke Zhao of Qi.

Duke Xiao of Qi House of Jiang Died: 633 BC
Regnal titles
Preceded by Wukui	Duke of Qi; 642–633 BC	Succeeded by Duke Zhao of Qi
