= Duke Qing of Qi =

Duke Qing of Qi 齊頃公

Duke of Qi
- Reign: 598–582 BC
- Predecessor: Duke Hui
- Successor: Duke Ling
- Died: 582 BC
- Spouse: Sheng Meng Zi (聲孟子)
- Issue: Duke Ling
Names
- Ancestral name: Jiāng (姜); Clan name: Lǚ (呂); Given name: Wúyě (無野)
Posthumous name
- Duke Qing (頃公)
- House: Jiang
- Dynasty: Jiang Qi
- Father: Duke Hui
- Mother: Xiao Tong Shu Zi (蕭同叔子)

Duke Qing of Qi (Chinese: 齊頃公; pinyin: Qí Qǐng Gōng), personal name Lü Wuye, was the 23rd ruler of the Jiang Qi state from 598 BC until his death in 582 BC.

== Accession to throne ==
Duke Qing was the son of Duke Hui of Qi and grandson of Duke Huan, the greatest leader of the State of Qi. He succeeded his father, who died in 599 BC after a ten-year reign. Duke Hui had favoured the official Cui Zhu (崔杼). After Duke Hui's death the powerful Gao and Guo clans of Qi expelled Cui, who fled to the State of Wey. Cui would later return to Qi and cause great turmoil in the state.

== Battle of An ==
In 589 BC, Qi attacked the states of Lu and Wey, and annexed the Lu city of Long. Lu and Wey were allies of the State of Jin, a major power of the Spring and Autumn period. In response, Duke Jing of Jin dispatched the Jin army led by generals Xi Ke, Shi Xie, Luan Shu, and Han Jue to help his allies. The Qi and Jin forces fought at An (near present-day Jinan), and Qi was decisively defeated. Duke Qing narrowly escaped capture by exchanging clothes and position with officer Pang Choufu (逢丑父), who was taken prisoner by Jin general Han Jue mistaking him as Duke Qing. After the battle Duke Qing was forced to plead for peace and cede territory to the state of Lu.

Duke Qing was greatly humbled by the defeat at the Battle of An. After the battle he reduced taxes, gave alms to orphans and the infirm, and was said to forgo alcohol and meat until his death seven years later.

== Death and succession ==
Duke Qing died in 582 BC after 17 years of reign. He was succeeded by his son Huan, Duke Ling of Qi.

== Family ==
Wives:

- Sheng Meng Zi, of the Zi clan (聲孟子 子姓), the mother of Prince Huan

Sons:

- Prince Huan (公子環; d. 554 BC), ruled as Duke Ling of Qi from 581 to 554 BC

Duke Qing of Qi House of Jiang Died: 582 BC
Regnal titles
Preceded by Duke Hui of Qi	Duke of Qi; 598–582 BC	Succeeded by Duke Ling of Qi
