= Duke Yì of Qi =

Duke Yi of Qi 齊懿公

Duke of Qi
- Reign: 612–609 BC
- Predecessor: Lü She
- Successor: Duke Hui
- Died: 609 BC
Names
- Ancestral name: Jiāng (姜); Clan name: Lǚ (呂); Given name: Shāngrén (商人)
Posthumous name
- Duke Yi (懿公)
- House: Jiang
- Dynasty: Jiang Qi
- Father: Duke Huan
- Mother: Mi Ji (密姬)

Duke Yi of Qi (Chinese: 齊懿公; pinyin: Qí Yì Gōng), personal name Lü Shangren, was the 21st ruler of the Jiang Qi state from 612 BC until his death in 609 BC.

== Accession to the throne ==
Duke Yì's father was Duke Huan of Qi, who was the first of the Five Hegemons, the most powerful rulers of the Spring and Autumn period. Duke Huan had at least three main wives who bore no sons, six favoured concubines, and more than ten sons. Duke Yì was then known as Prince Shangren, and his mother was Mi Ji, a princess of the minor state of Mi (密). Five other sons of Duke Huan also contended for the throne: Prince Wukui, Crown Prince Zhao (later Duke Xiao), Prince Pan (later Duke Zhao), Prince Yuan (later Duke Hui), and Prince Yong.

When Duke Huan died in the tenth month of 643 BC, the six princes fought one another for the throne. Wukui prevailed at first, but was killed three months later and replaced by Duke Xiao. Duke Xiao died after ten years of reign, and was succeeded by Duke Zhao whose supporters killed Duke Xiao's son.

Duke Zhao reigned for 20 years and died in the fifth month of 613 BC, and his son She ascended the throne. However, just two months later Prince Shangren murdered his nephew on the tomb of Duke Xiao and usurped the throne. He was the fourth of five sons of Duke Huan to become the ruler of the state, and was posthumously known as Duke Yì of Qi.

== Death and succession ==
Duke Yì reigned for four years, and was killed by Bing Chu (邴歜) and Yan Zhi (閻職) in 609 BC. The ministers of Qi deposed his son and installed his half-brother Prince Yuan, who was then exiled in the State of Wey, on the throne. Prince Yuan would become known as Duke Hui of Qi.

Duke Yì of Qi House of Jiang Died: 609 BC
Regnal titles
Preceded by She	Duke of Qi; 612–609 BC	Succeeded by Duke Hui of Qi
