= Duke Ling of Qi =

Ruler of Qi, ancient China, 581 to 554 BC

Duke Ling of Qi 齊靈公

Duke of Qi
- Reign: 581–554 BC
- Predecessor: Duke Qing
- Successor: Duke Zhuang II
- Died: 554 BC
- Spouse: Yan Yi Ji (顏懿姬)
- Issue: Duke Zhuang II; Lü Ya (呂牙); Duke Jing
Names
- Ancestral name: Jiāng (姜); Clan name: Lǚ (呂); Given name: Huán (環)
Posthumous name
- Duke Huanwu Ling (桓武靈公)
- House: Jiang
- Dynasty: Jiang Qi
- Father: Duke Qing
- Mother: Sheng Meng Zi (聲孟子)

Duke Ling of Qi (Chinese: 齊靈公; pinyin: Qí Líng Gōng), personal name Lü Huan, was the 24th ruler of the Jiang Qi state from 581 BC until his death in 554 BC. He succeeded his father, Duke Qing, and was in turn succeeded by one of his sons, Duke Zhuang II.

== Attack from Jin ==
In 572 BC, Duke Dao of the State of Jin attacked Qi. Duke Ling made peace with Jin by sending his son Prince Guang (later Duke Zhuang II of Qi) to Jin as a hostage. Nine years later Prince Guang was made the crown prince of Qi.

== Annexing the State of Lai ==
In 567 BC, the fifteenth year of Duke Ling's reign, the State of Lai attacked Qi but was decisively defeated. The Qi army counterattacked, killed the Lai ruler Duke Gong, and conquered the entire state. Lai was a large Dongyi state to the east of Qi, and the state of Qi more than doubled the size of its territory after annexing Lai.

== Battle of Pingyin ==
In 555 BC, Duke Ling switched his alliance from Jin to its enemy State of Chu. To punish Qi, Duke Ping of Jin invaded and inflicted a crushing defeat on Qi. The Jin army, led by general Zhonghang Yan, occupied large swathes of Qi territory, besieged the Qi capital Linzi, and burned down the outer portion of the city. This was the worst defeat that Qi had suffered during the Spring and Autumn period.

== Succession ==
Duke Ling's main wife was Yan Yi Ji, a princess of the State of Lu, who had no son. His original heir, Crown Prince Guang, was the son of Sheng Ji, niece of Yan Yi Ji. Duke Ling also had at least two other concubines, Zhong Zi and Rong Zi, who were both princesses of the State of Song. Zhong Zi bore a son named Ya, while Rong Zi had no son but took Prince Ya under her wing. Duke Ling favoured Rong Zi, who asked him to make Prince Ya the new crown prince. Although Zhong Zi objected, Duke Ling still deposed Prince Guang and made Prince Ya his heir.

In 554 BC, the 28th year of his reign, Duke Ling fell ill and died in the fifth month. The powerful minister Cui Zhu installed Guang, the original crown prince, on the throne, to be known as Duke Zhuang II of Qi. Cui Zhu and Duke Zhuang killed Rong Zi, Prince Ya, and rival minister Gao Hou, who supported Prince Ya.

Duke Ling also had another son named Chujiu, born to another of Duke Ling's concubines, who was the daughter of Shusun Xuanbo, leader of the Shusun clan of Lu. Cui Zhu would later kill Duke Zhuang and install Chujiu on the throne, to be known as Duke Jing of Qi.

== Family ==
Wives:

- Yan Yi Ji, of the Ji clan of Lu (顏懿姬 姬姓)

Concubines:

- Zong Sheng Ji, of the Ji clan of Lu (鬷聲姬 姬姓), Yan Yi Ji's niece; the mother of Crown Prince Guang
- Zhong Zi, of the Zi clan of Song (仲子 子姓), the mother of Crown Prince Ya
- Rong Zi, of the Zi clan of Song (戎子 子姓; d. 554 BC), Zhong Ji's dowry younger sister
- Mu Meng Ji, of the Shusun lineage of the Ji clan of Lu (穆孟姬 姬姓 叔孫氏), a daughter of Shusun Qiaoru (叔孫僑如); the mother of Prince Chujiu

Sons:

- Crown Prince Guang (太子光; d. 548 BC), ruled as Duke Zhuang II of Qi from 553–548 BC
- Crown Prince Ya (太子牙; d. 554 BC)
- Prince Chujiu (公子杵臼; d. 490 BC), ruled as Duke Jing of Qi from 547–490 BC

Duke Ling of Qi House of Jiang Died: 554 BC
Regnal titles
Preceded by Duke Qing of Qi	Duke of Qi; 581–554 BC	Succeeded by Duke Zhuang II of Qi
