= Duke Huan of Qi =

Ruler of Qi (r. 685 to 643 BCE)

Duke Huan of Qi 齊桓公
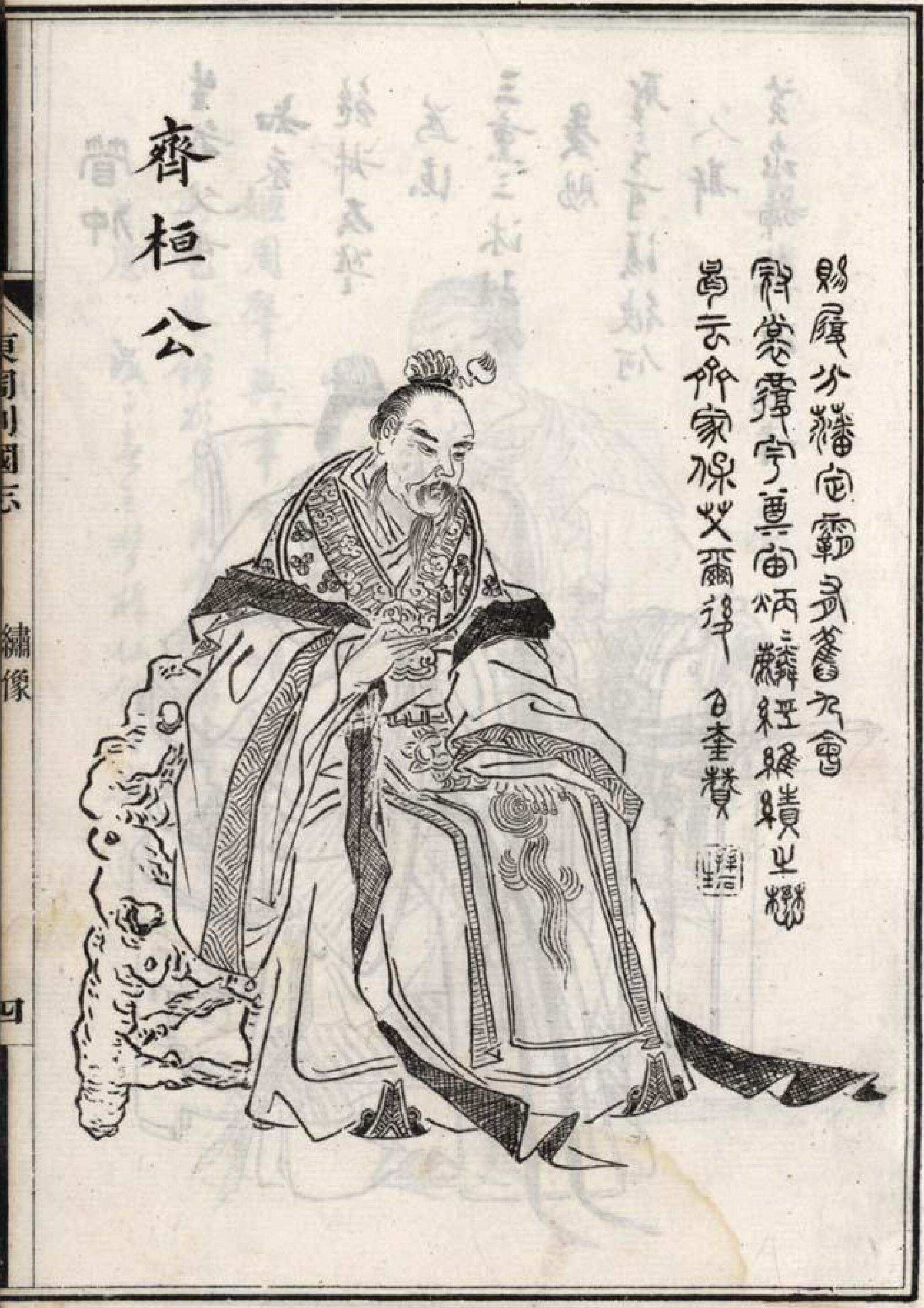

Duke of Qi
- Tenure: 685 – 643 BC
- Predecessor: Lü Wuzhi
- Successor: Lü Wukui
- Full name: Ancestral name: Jiāng (姜); Clan name: Lǚ (呂); Given name: Xiǎobái (小白); Posthumous name: Duke Huan (桓公)
- Died: 643 BC
- Noble family: Qi
- Spouses: Wang Ji; Xu Ying; Cai Ji
- Issue: Lü Wukui; Lü Yuan; Lü Zhao; Lü Pan; Lü Shangren; Qi Jiang
- Father: Duke Xi
- Mother: Wey Ji

Duke Huan of Qi (Chinese: 齊桓公; pinyin: Qí Huán Gōng), personal name Lü Xiaobai, was the 16th ruler of the Jiang Qi state from 685 BC until his death in 643 BC.

Duke Huan and his long-time advisor Guan Zhong managed to transform Qi into China's most powerful polity. Duke Huan is commonly listed among the Five Hegemons of the Spring and Autumn period. Toward the end of his more than 40-year-long reign, however, Duke Huan's power began to decline as he grew ill and the Qi state came to be embroiled in factional strife. Following his death in 643 BC, Qi completely lost its predominance.

== Early life and rise to power ==
Xiǎobái was born as one of Duke Xi of Qi's sons, though not in line of succession for the throne as he had at least two older brothers: Zhu'er and Jiu. In his youth, Xiǎobái was tutored by Bao Shuya. When Duke Xi eventually died, Zhu'er became Qi's next ruler as "Duke Xiang" but his reign was fraught with internal conflicts and scandals. Recognizing this and fearing for his pupil's life, Bao Shuya took Xiǎobái and fled with him to the state of Ju where they went on to live in exile.

Duke Xiang was assassinated in 686 BC, which allowed his cousin, Wuzhi, to ascend the throne. After just one month in office, however, Wuzhi was also murdered. With these two dead, Xiǎobái returned to Qi with the goal of becoming the next duke. He faced opposition in the form of his older brother Jiu however. Prince Jiu, by then also in exile, managed to gain the support of several high-ranking officials in Qi, his tutor Guan Zhong and Duke Zhuang of Lu. Before Jiu could be installed as new duke of Qi, however, Xiǎobái managed to seize control of Qi's government as well as its army, and was crowned as "Duke Huan of Qi" in 685 BC. The army of Lu under Duke Zhuang promptly invaded in order to install Prince Jiu on the throne, but the invading force suffered a crushing defeat at Qianshi and had to retreat. Qi's army under Bao Shuya in turn invaded Lu, and demanded Jiu and his supporters be handed over. To appease Duke Huan, Duke Zhuang then executed the rogue prince and delivered Guan Zhong to Qi as a prisoner.

== Reign ==
=== Rise to hegemon ===
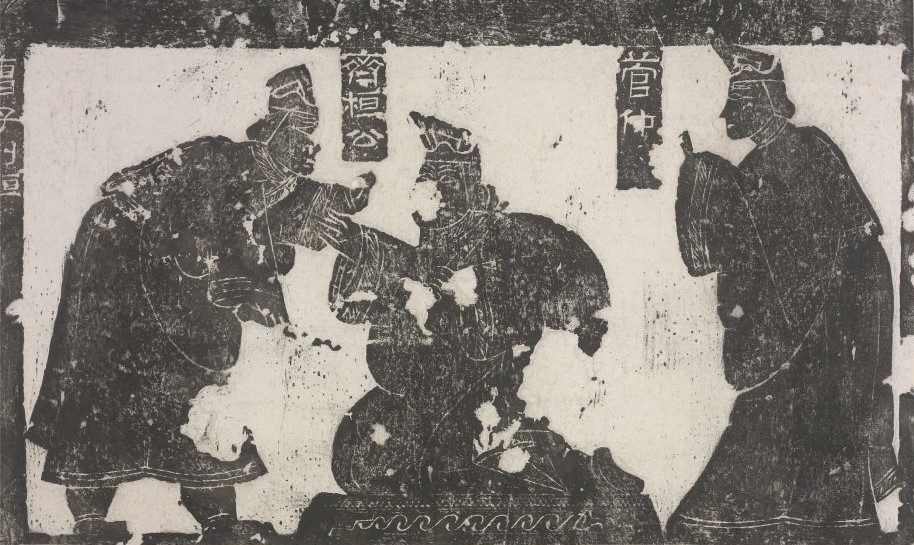
Duke Huan of Qi (middle) and Guan Zhong (right) depicted on the Wu Family Shrines stone-relief

Though he was now secure on the throne, the question that remained for Duke Huan was what to do with Guan Zhong who had so prominently supported his rival brother. Bao Shuya asked his newly crowned ruler to not just spare Guan Zhong, but to even employ him as chief minister due to his great talents. Duke Huan followed this advice, and Guan Zhong became his most important and capable advisor. The two went on to reorganize Qi's government and society, dividing both the land as well as the people into regulated units and enforcing a meritocratic system of governance. This greatly strengthened Qi, as it allowed the state to "mobilize human and material resources more effectively than other Zhou states, which remained loosely structured." As Qi had already been a powerful polity in a favorable strategic situation before, these reforms managed to bring Qi to "an unprecedented status of leadership in the entire Zhou world". Together, Duke Huan and Guan Zhong worked toward achieving dominance over the other Zhou states, and as time went on ever more of them became followers of Qi.

=== Hegemony ===
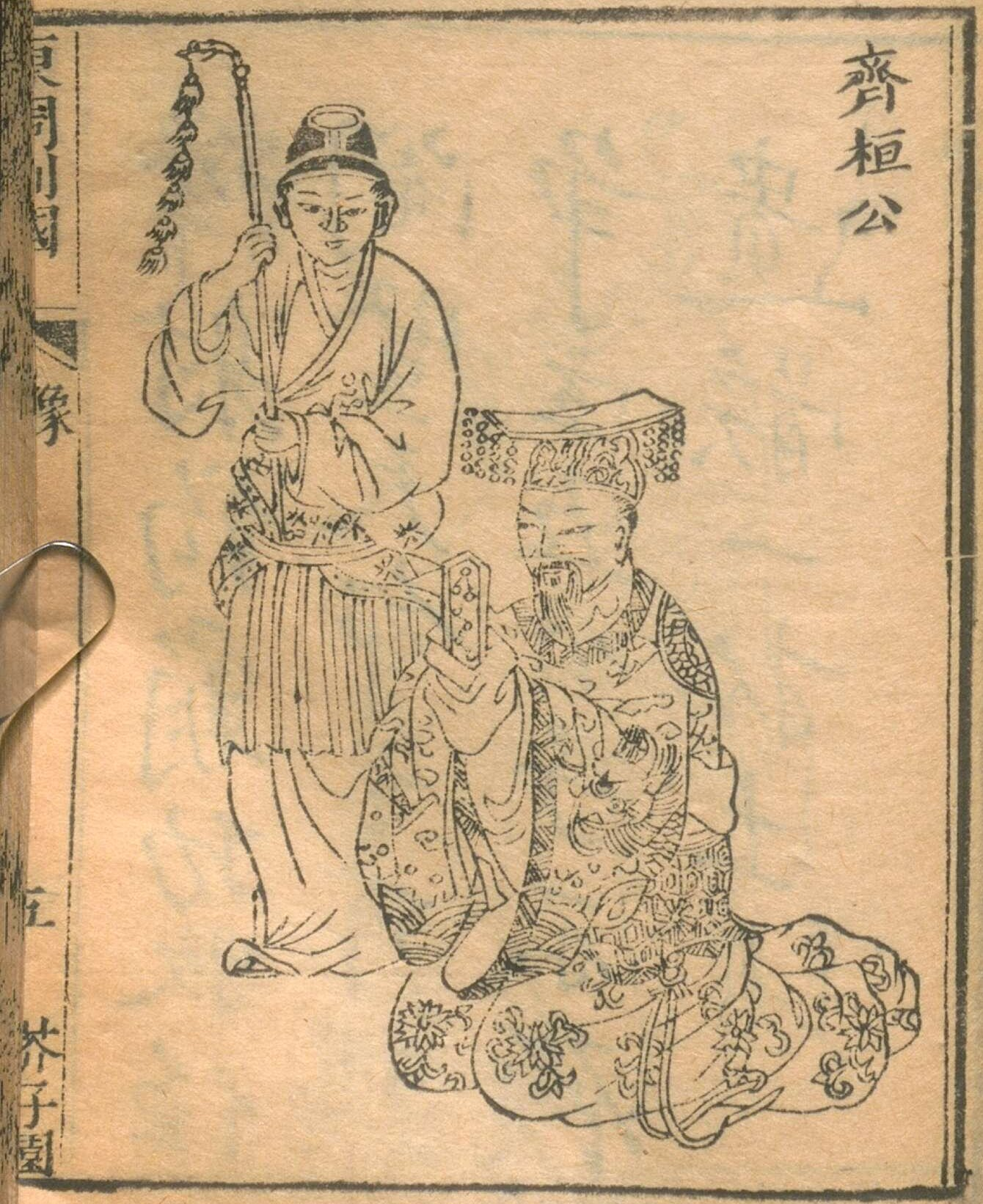
Duke Huan of Qi

Eventually Duke Huan invited the rulers of Lu, Song, Chen, and Zheng to a conference in 667 BC, where they elected him as their leader. After hearing of this, King Hui of Zhou appointed Duke Huan hegemon (ba) with the authority to operate militarily in the name of the royal court. Duke Huan and Guan Zhong envisioned the office of "hegemon" not just as mere position of military power, but rather as one that was supposed to "restore the authority of the Son of Heaven" or, more practically, restabilize the old realm of the Zhou dynasty under the leadership of Qi.

Consequently, Duke Huan intervened in matters that concerned the interstate relationships of the Zhou polities, both on behalf of King Hui as well as to assert his own position as hegemon. Such interventions included a punitive expedition against Wey in 671 BC, because this state had defied King Hui, as well as involvement in a power struggle in Lu in order to cement Qi's power. Another major concern for Duke Huan was the threat that outside powers (derogatorily called the "Four Barbarians") posed to the Zhou states, and he would launch numerous campaigns to fend off these "barbarians". Most notably, he saved the states of Yan, Xing and Wey from invasions by non-Zhou groups, and tried to stop the expansion of Chu in the south. In 656 BC he led an alliance of eight states against a satellite state of Chu, Cai, and defeated it. The alliance then proceeded to invade Chu itself, and eventually a pact was concluded. Chu stopped its northward expansion and agreed to take part in an compulsory interstate meeting at Shaoling. This meeting, the first of its kind, set a precedent.

Over the following years, Duke Huan convened numerous interstate meetings under the auspices of the Zhou royal family. Points of discussion during these meetings ranged from military matters to economics to general orders concerning governance and laws. Overall, the ruler of Qi managed to restore some stability in the volatile and fractious Zhou realm. Historian Cho-yun Hsu summarizes that Duke Huan "used his Ba [hegemon] leadership to set up a new order for an interstate community that was to be guarded by consensus rather than authority."

=== Decline in power and death ===
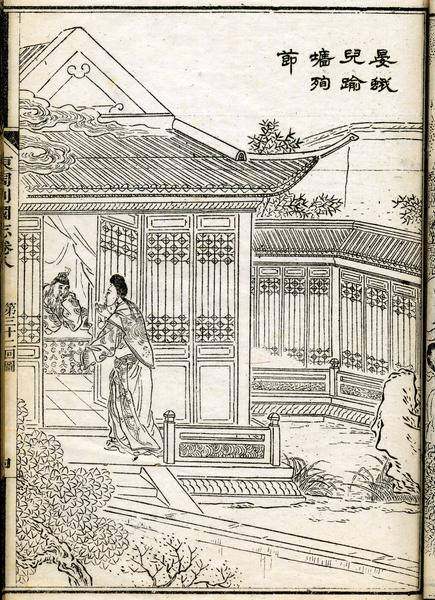
Duke Huan of Qi was allegedly locked in his room and starved to death by four powerful officials (illustration from Dōngzhōu Lièguó Zhì or the Chronicles of the Eastern Zhou Kingdoms).

After almost forty years on the throne, however, Duke Huan's dominance began to gradually decline. His efforts to completely stop Chu's expansion failed, as the southern state had simply shifted its attention from the north to the east. There, along the Huai River, Chu conquered or invaded several states allied with Qi. The last major anti-Chu military alliance assembled by Duke Huan failed to stop this development, and was even defeated during the Battle of Loulin in 645 BC. Guan Zhong also died in that year, depriving the ruler of Qi of his most important advisor. Having grown ill, Duke Huan was increasingly ignored by the leaders of other states, and even his authority over Qi itself declined as various political factions began to vie for power.

These factions were formed by high officials as well as six of the duke's sons. These six, namely Zhao, Wukui, Pan, Shangren, Yuan, and Yong, were all the children of different concubines, as Duke Huan's three main wives bore him no sons. As a result, all of them felt themselves entitled to the throne. Though Qi's ruler had designated Prince Zhao as his heir and even charged Duke Xiang of Song with ensuring that he would ascend the throne, this did not stop the other five from plotting their own rise to power. According to the Guanzi, the elderly duke had also to deal with four powerful officials: Tang Wu, the court sorcerer; Yiya, the chief cook; Shu Diao, the chief of the eunuchs; and Gongzi Kaifang, a leading courtier. Shortly before his death, Guan Zhong had advised that they should be sent into exile. Duke Huan did so, but he found himself missing their particular talents at the court and allowed them to return. They then conspired against him, and locked him in his room, secretly starving him to death. Other notable sources for these events, such as the Zuo Zhuan and the Records of the Grand Historian do not mention this purported assassination.

Duke Huan of Qi finally died in late 643 BC, and the capital Linzi quickly descended into violence. His six sons, supported by various officials, took up arms against each other in order to size the throne, starting a war of succession. In this chaos, Duke Huan could not be buried and his corpse was left unattended in his bedchamber for between seven days and three months. By the time he was finally encoffined, the corpse had begun to rot. (Note: The Guanzi claims his corpse was left to rot for seven or eleven days. Both the Zuo Zhuan as well as the Records of the Grand Historian report sixty-seven days, while the Han Feizi record three months. Whatever number was correct, historians have noted that it was customary to prepare the corpse for burial during the day. In Duke Huan's case, however, the ceremony took place in the night, which "clearly indicates that the situation was anomalous".) With Duke Huan's sons fighting for the throne, Qi was severely weakened and lost its status as China's predominant state. Although Zhao, by then ruling as Duke Xiao of Qi, eventually attempted to regain his father's hegemony, he failed and Duke Wen of Jin became the next hegemon.

== Family ==
Wives:

- Wang Ji, of the Ji clan of Zhou (王姬 姬姓), a princess of Zhou by birth
- Xu Ying, of the Ying clan of Xu (徐嬴 嬴姓)
- Cai Ji, of the Ji clan of Cai (蔡姬 姬姓)

Concubines:

- Wey Gong Ji, of the Ji clan of Wey (衛共姬 姬姓), the mother of Prince Wukui
- Shao Wey Ji, of the Ji clan of Wey (少衛姬 姬姓), the mother of Prince Yuan
- Zheng Ji, of the Ji clan of Zheng (鄭姬 姬姓), the mother of Crown Prince Zhao
- Ge Ying, of the Ying clan of Ge (葛嬴 嬴姓), the mother of Prince Pan
- Mi Ji, of the Ji clan of Mi (密姬 姬姓), the mother of Prince Shangren
- Song Hua Zi, of the Zi clan of Song (宋華子 子姓), the mother of Prince Yong

Sons:

- Prince Wukui (公子無虧; d. 642 BC), ruled as the Duke of Qi in 642 BC
- Prince Yuan (公子元; d. 599 BC), ruled as Duke Hui of Qi from 608 to 599 BC
- Crown Prince Zhao (太子昭; d. 633 BC), ruled as Duke Xiao of Qi from 641 to 633 BC
- Prince Pan (公子潘; d. 613 BC), ruled as Duke Zhao of Qi from 632 to 613 BC
- Prince Shangren (公子商人; d. 609 BC), ruled as Duke Yì of Qi from 612 to 609 BC
- Prince Yong (公子雍)
  - Granted the fiefdom of Gu (谷) in 634 BC
- Seven sons who served as Grand Masters (大夫) of Chu

Daughters:

- Qi Jiang (齊姜)
  - Married Duke Wu of Jin (d. 677 BC)
  - Married Duke Xian of Jin (d. 651 BC), and had issue (Crown Prince Shensheng, Mu Ji (the wife of Duke Mu of Qin and mother of Duke Kang of Qin))

== Bibliography ==
- Cho-yun Hsu (1999). "The Spring and Autumn Period". In Michael Loewe; Edward L. Shaughnessy (eds.). The Cambridge History of ancient China – From the Origins of Civilization to 221 B.C. Cambridge: Cambridge University Press. pp. 545–586. ISBN 978-0521470308.
- Cook, Constance A.; Major, John S. (1999). Defining Chu: Image And Reality In Ancient China. Honolulu: University of Hawaii Press. ISBN 0-8248-2905-0.
- Rickett, W. Allyn (2001). Guanzi: Political, Economic, and Philosophical Essays from Early China. Boston: Cheng & Tsui Company. ISBN 0-88727-324-6.
- Sima Qian (2006). William H. Nienhauser, Jr. (ed.). The Grand Scribe's Records: The Hereditary Houses of Pre-Han China, Part 1. Bloomington, Indiana: Indiana University Press. ISBN 0-253-34025-X.
- Zuo Qiuming (2015). Harry Miller (ed.). The Gongyang Commentary on The Spring and Autumn Annals: A Full Translation. New York City: Palgrave Macmillan. ISBN 978-1137497635.
- Durrant, Stephen; Li, Wai-yee; Schaberg, David (2016). Zuo Tradition/Zuozhuan: Commentary on the "Spring and Autumn Annals" (1st ed.). Seattle: University of Washington Press. ISBN 9780295999159.

Duke Huan of Qi House of Jiang Died: 643 BC
Regnal titles
Preceded by Wuzhi	Duke of Qi; 685–643 BC	Succeeded by Wukui
