= Duke Zhuang II of Qi =

Ruler of Qi, ancient China, 553 to 548 BC

Duke Zhuang II of Qi 齊後莊公

Duke of Qi
- Reign: 553–548 BC
- Predecessor: Duke Ling
- Successor: Duke Jing
- Died: 548 BC
- Issue: Shao Jiang (少姜)
Names
- Ancestral name: Jiāng (姜); Clan name: Lǚ (呂); Given name: Guāng (光)
Posthumous name
- Duke Zhuang (莊公)
- House: Jiang
- Dynasty: Jiang Qi
- Father: Duke Ling
- Mother: Zong Sheng Ji (鬷聲姬)

Duke Zhuang II of Qi (Chinese: 齊後莊公; pinyin: Qí Hòu Zhuāng Gōng), personal name Lü Guang, was the 25th ruler of the Jiang Qi state from 553 BC until his death in 548 BC.

== Accession to the throne ==
Lü Guang known in historiography as Duke Zhuang II of Qi to distinguish from the earlier ruler with the same posthumous name.

Prince Guang was the son of Duke Ling of Qi and his concubine Sheng Ji. In 572 BC Duke Dao of the state of Jin attacked Qi. Duke Ling made peace with Jin by sending Prince Guang to Jin as a hostage.

In 563 BC, Guang was made the crown prince of Qi. However, Duke Ling later deposed him and made his half-brother Ya the new crown prince, at the request of his favorite concubine Rong Zi. In the fifth month of 554 BC, Duke Ling died after 28 years of reign, and the powerful minister Cui Zhu installed Guang on the throne instead of the new crown prince Ya. Prince Guang is posthumously known as Duke Zhuang II of Qi. Cui Zhu and Duke Zhuang subsequently killed Rong Zi, Prince Ya, and minister Gao Hou, who supported Ya.

== Battles with Jin ==
In 551 BC, Luan Ying, leader of the powerful Luan Clan of the State of Jin, rebelled against Jin, but was defeated and fled to Qi. Minister Yan Ying advised Duke Zhuang against supporting rebels of Jin, to no avail. The next year, with Duke Zhuang's support, Luan secretly returned to Quwo, the old Jin capital, and rebelled again. Meanwhile, Duke Zhuang dispatched the Qi army to invade Jin, reaching the Taihang Mountains. Luan achieved some initial success, and even briefly captured the Jin capital, Jiang. However, he was soon defeated by the Jin army and killed at Quwo. After hearing of Luan's defeat, the Qi forces retreated, taking the city of Zhaoge on the way back. Two years later, Jin attacked Qi for revenge.

== Death ==
Duke Zhuang had an adulterous relationship with Cui Zhu's second wife Tang Jiang, which Cui learned about. In the fifth month of 548 BC, the viscount of the minor state of Ju came to pay tribute to Qi. Cui pretended to be ill and did not attend the banquet for the Viscount of Ju.

The next day, Duke Zhuang visited Cui at his home and tried to have a tryst with his wife. Cui had his men block the Duke's guards outside and surround Duke Zhuang in the courtyard. Duke Zhuang tried to escape by climbing a wall, but was shot by an arrow and killed. Cui Zhu subsequently installed Duke Zhuang's younger half-brother Chujiu on the throne, to be known as Duke Jing of Qi.

== Family ==
Daughters:

- Shao Jiang (少姜)
  - Married Duke Ping of Jin (d. 532 BC)

Duke Zhuang II of Qi House of Jiang Died: 548 BC
Regnal titles
Preceded by Duke Ling of Qi	Duke of Qi; 553–548 BC	Succeeded by Duke Jing of Qi
