= Qi (state) =

Zhou dynasty Chinese state (1046–221 BCE)

Coordinates: 36.865°N 118.340°E

Qi 齊 *Dzəj
- 1046 BCE–221 BCE
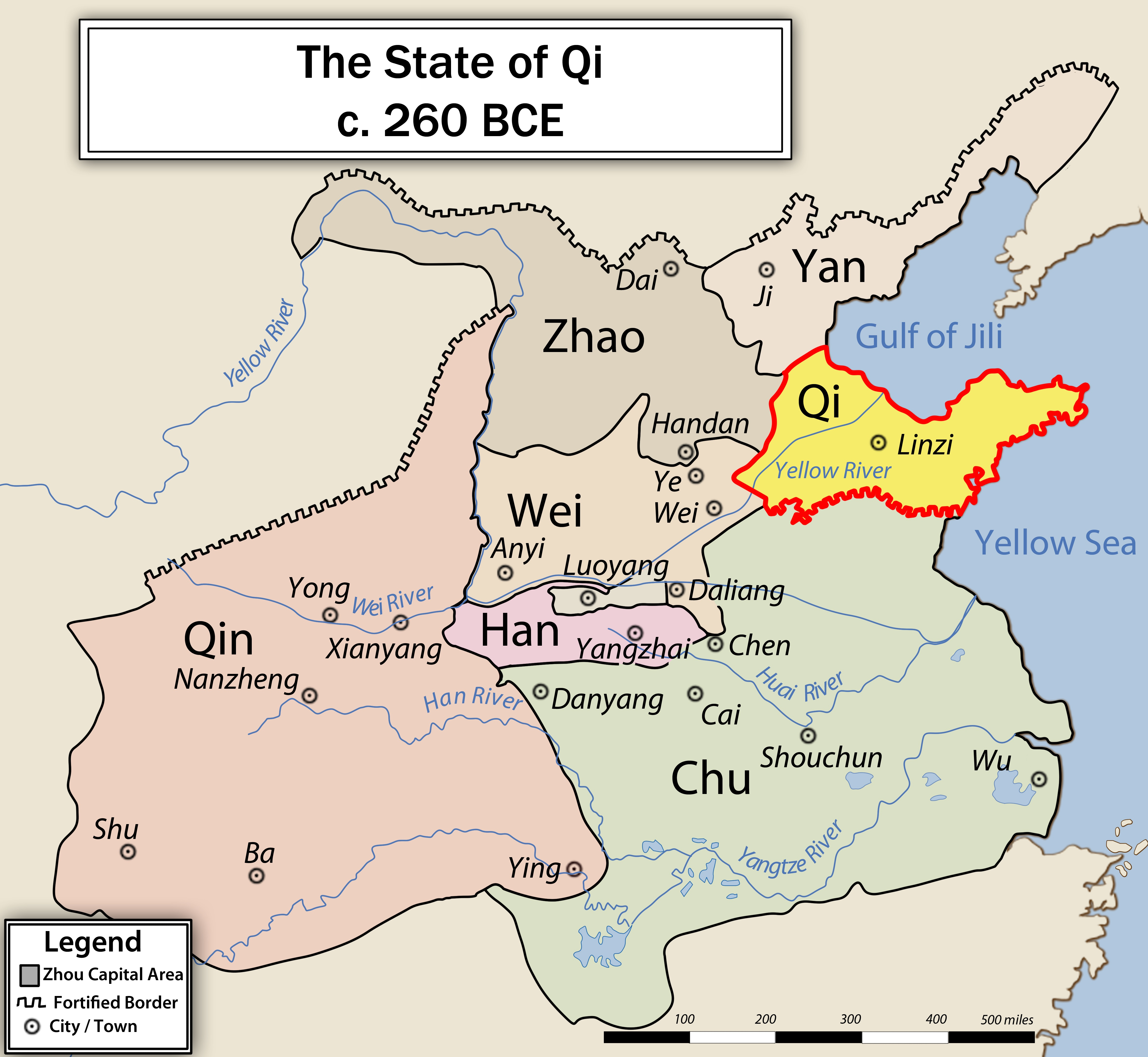
- Qi in 260 BCE
- Status: Regional State (1046–323 BCE); Kingdom (323–221 BCE)
- Capital: Yingqiu (11 c.–866 BCE); Bogu (866–859 BCE); Linzi (859–221 BCE)
- Religion: Ancestor worship; Chinese folk religion
- Government: Monarchy
- Lord of Qi
  - 685–643 BCE: Duke Huan of Qi
  - 547–490 BCE: Duke Jing of Qi
- Chancellor
  - 685–645 BCE: Guan Zhong
  - 556–500 BCE: Yan Ying
- History
  - Enfeoffment of Duke Tai: 1046 BCE
  - Conquered by Qin: 221 BCE
- Currency: Knife money
Preceded by	Succeeded by
Pugu	Qin dynasty

Qi
- "Qi" in seal script (top), Traditional (middle), and Simplified (bottom) Chinese characters
- Traditional Chinese: 齊
- Simplified Chinese: 齐
Transcriptions
Standard Mandarin
- Hanyu Pinyin: Qí
- Gwoyeu Romatzyh: Chyi
- Wade–Giles: Ch'i^{2}
- IPA: [tɕʰǐ]
Wu
- Suzhounese: Zi^{2}
Yue: Cantonese
- Yale Romanization: Chàih
- Jyutping: Cai^{4}
- IPA: [tsʰɐj˩]
Southern Min
- Hokkien POJ: Chê
- Tâi-lô: Tsê
Eastern Min
- Fuzhou BUC: Cà̤
Old Chinese
- Baxter–Sagart (2014): *[dz]ˤəj

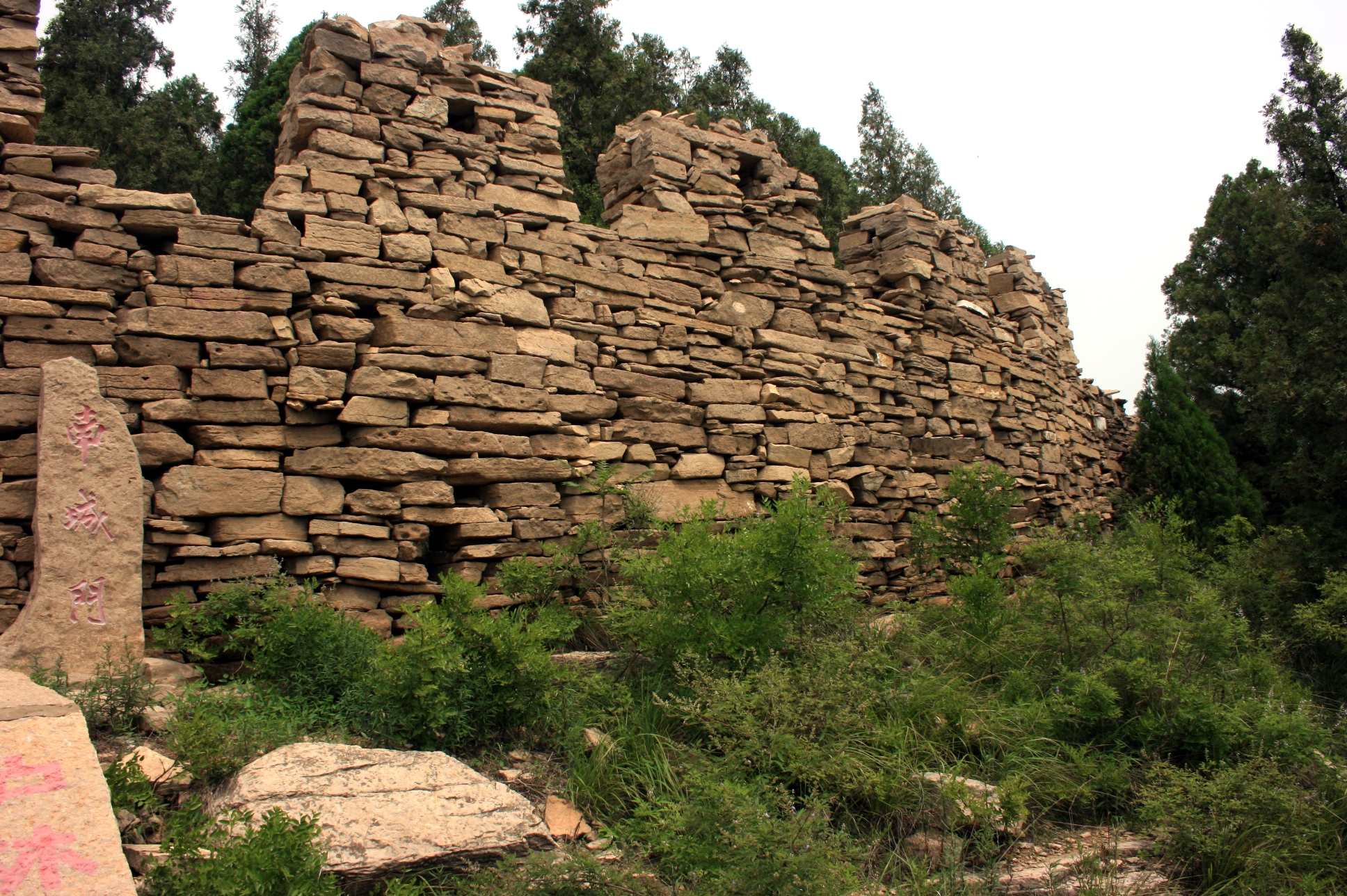
The Great Wall of Qi on Dafeng Mountain

Qi, or Ch'i in Wade–Giles romanization, was a regional state of the Zhou dynasty in ancient China, whose rulers held titles of Hou (侯), then Gong (公), before declaring themselves independent Kings (王). Its capital was Linzi, located in present-day Shandong. Qi was founded shortly after the Zhou conquest of Shang, c. 1046 BCE. Its first monarch was Jiang Ziya (Lord Tai; r. 1046–1015 BCE), minister of King Wen and a legendary figure in Chinese culture. His family ruled Qi for several centuries before it was replaced by the Tian family in 386 BCE. Qi was the final surviving state to be annexed by Qin during its unification of China.

== History ==
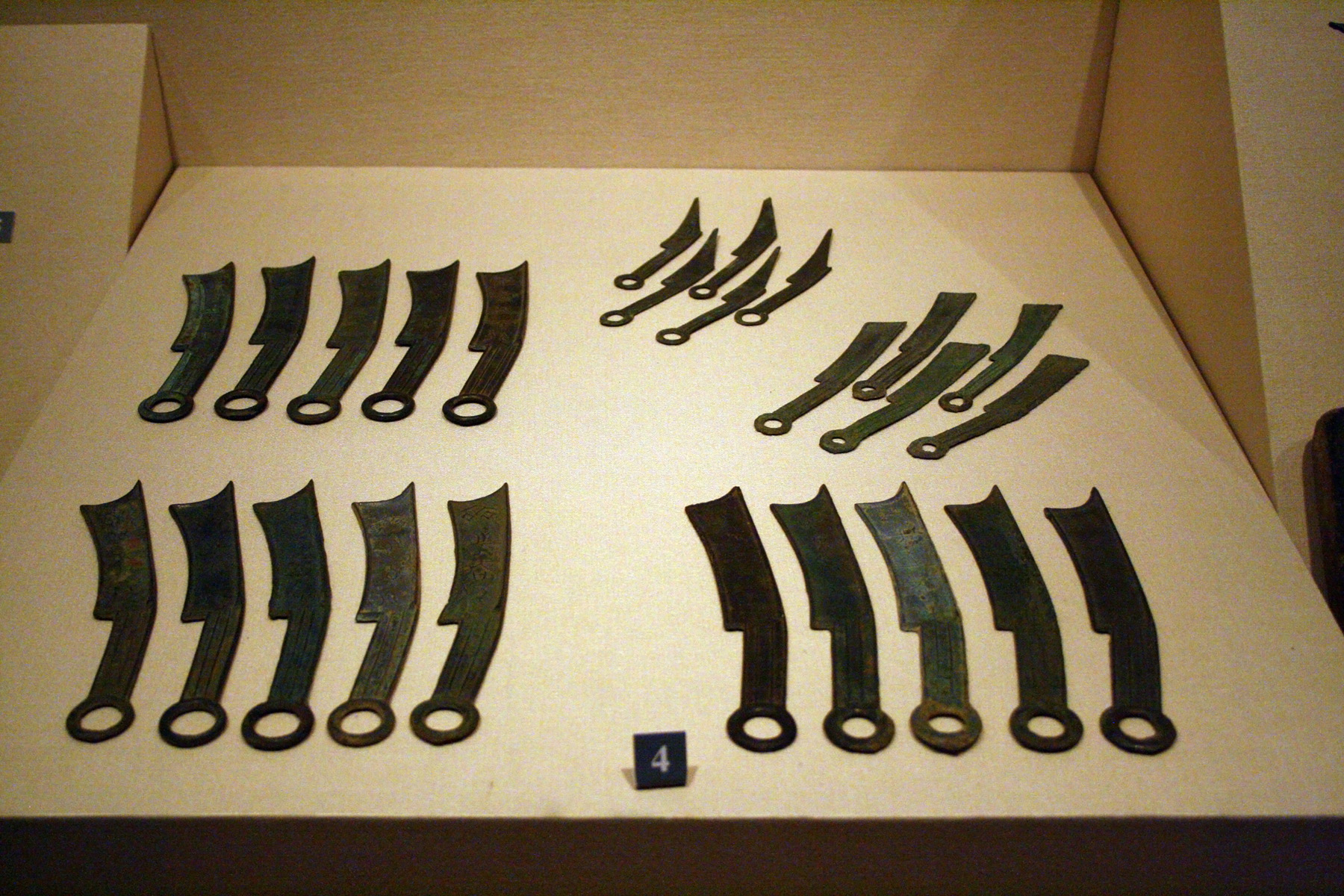
Bronze knife-shaped coins of State of Qi, collected in Shandong Museum

=== Foundation ===
During the Zhou conquest of Shang, Jiang Ziya, a native of Ju County served as the chief minister to King Wu of Zhou, the same position he had held in service to King Wu's father. Following Zhou victory, the lands comprising much of the Shandong peninsula and some nearby surrounds were established as the state of Qi, with the Jiang clan charged with ruling and defending them. After King Wu's death, Ziya remained loyal to the Duke of Zhou's regency during the Three Guards' failed rebellion. Jiang Ziya was also called Lü Shang so the state of Qi is ruled by the Lü family of the Jiang clan and was commonly known as Jiang Qi.

The Shang prince Wu Geng had joined the revolt along with the Dongyi polities of Yan, Xu, and Pugu, located within the boundaries of Qi. These were suppressed by 1039 BCE, but the Bamboo Annals suggest that the native people of Pugu continued to revolt for about another decade before being destroyed a second time c. 1026.

Transmitted documents from the Western Zhou period are scant, but it is known that King Yi of Zhou (r. 865–858 BCE) attacked Qi and boiled Duke Ai to death. During the time of King Xuan of Zhou (r. 827–782), there was a local succession struggle. Throughout this period, many of the native Dongyi peoples were absorbed into the Zhou culture.

=== Spring and Autumn period ===
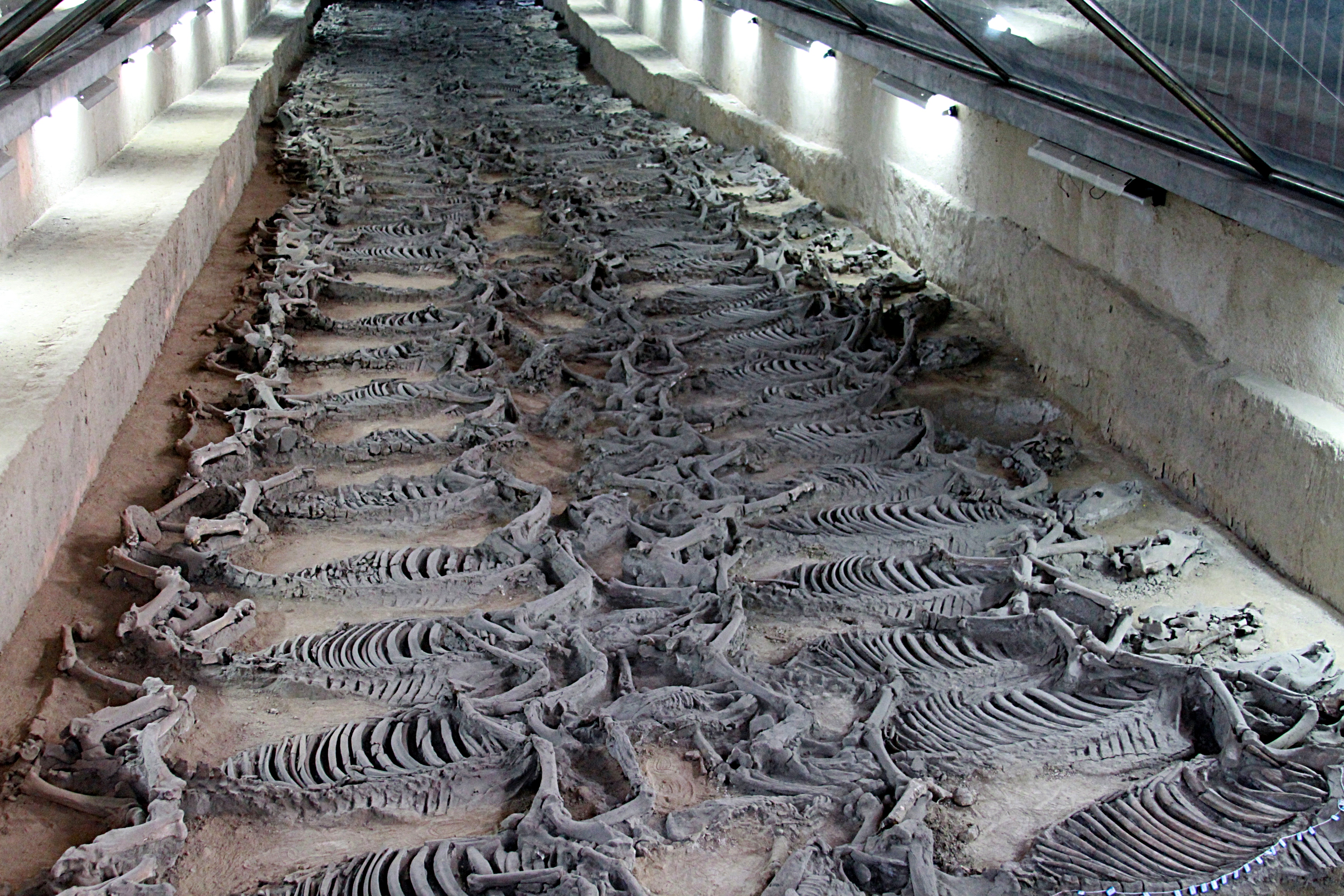
Sacrificial horses discovered in the tomb of Duke Jing of Qi

The succession crisis following the violent death of King You of Zhou led to a dramatic and unrecoverable loss of political and military authority in the Zhou royal court. Under this new geopolitical situation, Qi rose to prominence under Duke Huan of Qi (r. 685–643 BCE). He and his minister Guan Zhong strengthened the state by consolidating power in the hands of the central government at the expense of the landed aristocracy, establishing a system of counties (縣; xiàn) ruled directly by ministers of the state court. Qi annexed 35 neighboring polities – including Tan – and brought others into submission. Guan Zhong's administrative reforms also included state monopolies on salt and iron, and in general were characteristic of the later political philosophy of Legalism.

In 667 BCE, the lords of Qi, Lu, Song, Chen, and Zheng assembled in one of the first great interstate conferences, and Duke Huan was elected as their leader. Subsequently, King Hui of Zhou pronounced him Bà (霸; 'big brother'), the "hegemon-protector" sworn to protect the royal house of Zhou and uphold the authority of the Son of Heaven (the Zhou king). The first of five such hegemons, he earned a tribute from the other states, and had the honour of paying the royal court a larger tribute than anyone else. His calls to arms were as binding as the king's own. Using this authority, during the first eleven years of his hegemony, Duke Huan intervened in a power struggle in Lu; protected Yan from encroaching Western Rong nomads; drove off Northern Di nomads after their invasions of Wey and Xing, providing the people with provisions and protective garrison units; and led an alliance of eight states to conquer Cai and thereby block the northward expansion of Chu.

After Duke Huan's death, a war of succession between rival claimants greatly weakened Qi and ending its reign of hegemony. In 632 BCE, Qi helped Jin defeat Chu at the Battle of Chengpu, only to be defeated by Jin itself at the Battle of An in 589. In 579, the four great powers of Qin, Jin, Chu, and Qi met to declare a truce and limit their military strength.

=== Warring States period – Tian dynasty ===
Early in the period, Qi annexed a number of smaller states. Qi was one of the first states to patronize scholars. In 532 BCE, the Tian clan destroyed several rival families and came to dominate the state. In 485, the Tian clan killed the heir to the house of Jiang and fought several rival clans. Four years later, the Tian chief killed a puppet ruler, most of his family, and a number of rival chiefs. He took control of most of the state and left the monarch with only the capital of Linzi and the area around Mount Tai. In 386, the house of Tian fully replaced the house of Jiang as rulers of Qi.The state of Qi Under the rule of the Tian clan was also referred to as Tian Qi (田齊).

The Warring States period ended with the Qin conquest of Qi, which was the last to fall, in 222. So ended Qi, and the era of Imperial China began.

=== Restored Qi (209 BC - 203 BC) ===
During the uprisings at the end of Qin dynasty, the state of Qi was restored by the Qi aristocrat Tian Dan (田儋), who enthroned as the King of Qi in 209 BC. In 208 BC, Tian Dan led his army to help King Wei Jiu (魏咎) of Western Wei but was defeated by the Qin general Zhang Han. Tian Dan was killed and Tian Jia (田假), the younger brother of King Jian of Qi was enthroned.

Tian Dan's cousin Tian Rong raised an army to drive out Tian Jia, who then fled to the restored state of Chu. Tian Rong installed Tian Dan's son Tian Shi as King of Qi and demanded that Chu hand over Tian Jia. Chu refused, so Tian Rong did not join Xiang Yu's alliance against Qin. Xiang Yu instead enfeoffed Tian Du (田都) as the King of Qi. In 206 BC, Tian Rong rebelled against both Tian Shi and Tian Du and declared himself King. In 205 BC, Xiang Yu then led a large army to attack Qi, killing Tian Rong. At the same time, Liu Bang launched a surprise attack on Pengcheng, the capital of Chu, forcing Xiang Yu to withdraw his troops from Qi. Tian Rong's brother Tian Heng (田横) took the opportunity to recover Qi's territory and had Tian Rong's son Tian Guang enthroned as king.

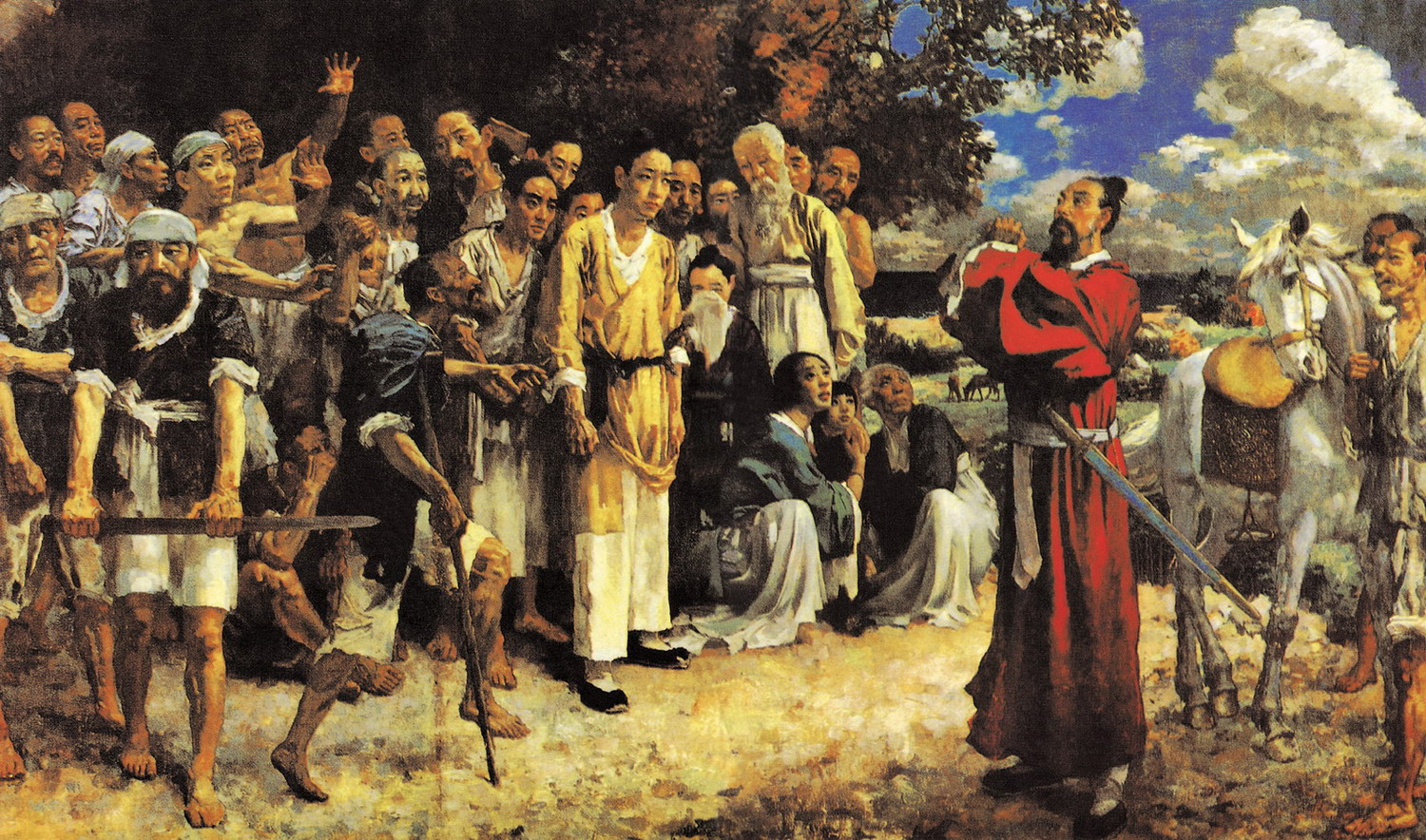
Xu Beihong's painting "Tian Heng and His Five Hundred Heroes"

In 203 BC, Liu Bang sent Li Yiji to Qi to negotiate for peace, finally persuading Tian Heng to ally with Han. However, Liu Bang's general Han Xin made a sudden move to launch an attack on the unprepared Qi forces. Enraged, King Tian Guang had Li Yiji executed by boiling. The Qi army was defeated, Han Xin captured Linzi and was enfeoffed as King of Qi. Tian Guang retreated and sought aid from Xiang Yu. Han Xin then defeated the combined armies of Tian Guang and the Chu general Long Ju; Long Ju was killed in battle and Tian Guang died of illness while fleeing. Tian Heng led over five hundred of his men to flee to a small island on the coast of Qi (now Tian Heng's Island in Jimo, Qingdao). In 202 BC, Liu Bang sent a messenger to pardon Tian Heng and summon him to Luoyang. Tian Heng committed suicide at only ten miles from Luoyang. Upon hearing of Tian Heng's death, all of his five hundred followers on the island also took their own lives.

Qi remained a kingdom within the Han Empire, consisting of seven commanderies: Linzi, Boyang, Jibei, Jiaodong, Jiaoxi, Chengyang and Langya. In 201 BC, Emperor Gaozu installed his eldest son Liu Fei as the King of Qi. The commanderies were then split into several fief kingdoms, with only the territory of Linzi Commandery retained the name "Qi". In 110 BC the Kingdom of Qi was abolished and the Qi Commandery was formed on the former Qi territory.

== Culture of Qi ==
Before Qin unified China, each state's customs, culture, dialects, and orthography had pronounced differences. According to the Yu Gong or Tribute of Yu, composed in the fourth or fifth century BCE and included in the Classic of Documents, there were nine distinct cultural regions of China, which are described in detail. The work focuses on the travels of the titular sage, Yu the Great, throughout each of the regions.

Other texts also discussed these cultural variations. One of these texts was The Book of Master Wu, written in response to a query by Marquis Wu of Wei on how to cope with the other states. Wu Qi, the author of the work, declared that the government and nature of the people were reflective of the terrain of the environment in which they inhabited. Of Qi, he said:

Although Qi's troops are numerous, their organization is unstable... The people of Qi are by nature unyielding and their country prosperous, but the ruler and officials are arrogant and care nothing for the people. The state's policies are not uniform and not strictly enforced. Salaries and wages are unfair and unevenly distributed, causing disharmony and disunity. Qi's army is arrayed with their heaviest hitters at the front while the rest follow behind, so that even when their forces appear mighty, they are in reality fragile. To defeat them, we should divide our army into three columns and have two attack the left and right flanks of Qi's army. Once their battle formations are thrown into disarray, the central column should be in position to attack and victory will follow.

— Wu Qi, Wuzi

While visiting Qi, Confucius was deeply impressed with perfection of performance of Shao music (韶) therein.

During the Warring States period, Qi was famous for Linzi's Jixia Academy, where renowned scholars of the era from all over China would visit. Modern scholarship understands the Jixia Academy not to be a physical institution, but an informal collaboration of sponsored scholars engaged in intellectual work. One impressive surviving achievement of the Jixia school of thought is the Yanzi Chunqiu.

== Qi architecture ==
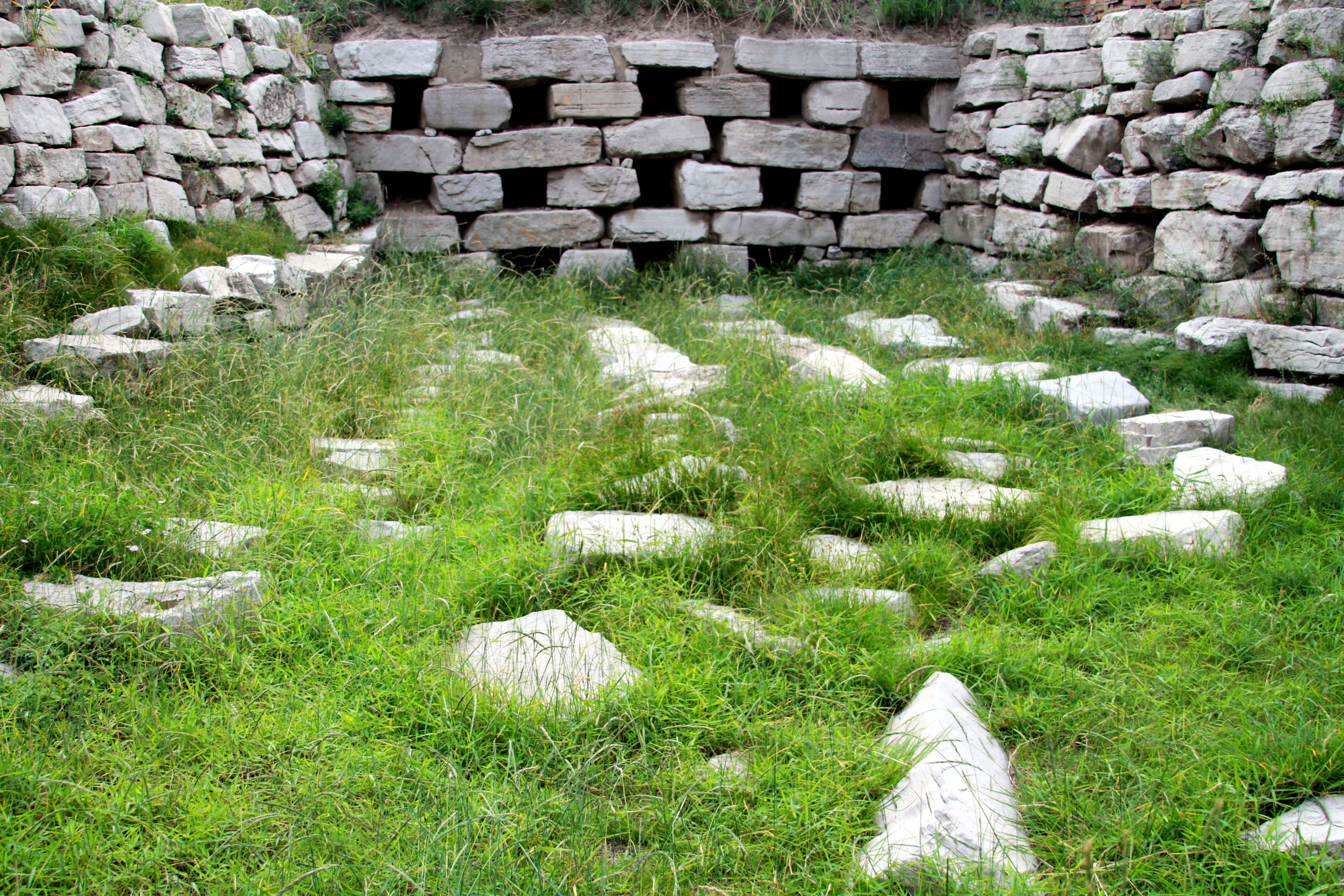
Remains of Ancient Linzi city sewer passing underneath the former city wall of the Qi kingdom

The state of Qi was known for having well organized cities that were nearly rectangular in shape, with roads that were neatly knit into a grid-like pattern. The palace was strategically positioned facing the south. To the left (eastwardly direction) of the palace resided the ancestral temple, to its right (westward) the temple of the gods, both one hundred paces away. This ensured that balance was achieved. In front of the palace was the court also one hundred paces away and to the back of the palace was the city. This type of layout influenced greatly the way cities were designed in subsequent generations.

Smaller estates known as chengyi (城邑) were abundant throughout Qi. They typically stretched 450 meters from south to north and 395 meters from east to west. The perimeter was usually surrounded by a wall with the living headquarters situated within and a nearly perfect square-shaped courtyard occupying the center.

The Great Wall of Qi (齊長城) is the oldest existing Great Wall in China. Construction of the wall started in 441 BCE to defend against attacks from the states of Jin and Yue. Construction ended during the Warring States period, with the wall enhancing Qi's defense against enemies states like Ju, Lu, and Chu. The wall stretches from Guangli village of today's Changqing District, Jinan, running across the mountain ridges of central Shandong Province to the Yellow Sea in the present-day city of Qingdao. Its total length has been estimated at 600 km (370 miles). Most of the wall is still visible.

== Qi in astronomy ==
Qi is represented by the star Chi Capricorni in the "Twelve States" asterism in the "Girl" lunar mansion in the "Black Turtle" symbol. Qi is also represented by the star 112 Herculis in the "Left Wall" asterism in the "Heavenly Market" enclosure.

== Rulers ==
=== House of Jiang ===
No.	Title	Name	Reign (BCE)	Relationship	Notes
1	Duke Tai 齊太公	Shang 尚	11th century		Enfeoffed by King Wu of Zhou, with capital at Yingqiu
2	Duke Ding 齊丁公	Ji 伋	10th century	5th-generation descendant of Duke Tai	Traditionally believed to be son of Duke Tai
3	Duke Yǐ 齊乙公	De 得	10th century	Son of Duke Ding	
4	Duke Gui 齊癸公	Cimu 慈母	c. 10th century	Son of Duke Yǐ	
5	Duke Ai 齊哀公	Buchen 不辰	9th century	Son of Duke Gui	Boiled to death by King Yi of Zhou
6	Duke Hu 齊胡公	Jing 靜	9th century	Son of Duke Gui	Moved capital to Bogu, killed by Duke Xian
7	Duke Xian 齊獻公	Shan 山	859?–851	Son of Duke Gui	Moved capital back to Linzi
8	Duke Wu 齊武公	Shou 壽	850–825	Son of Duke Xian	
9	Duke Li 齊厲公	Wuji 無忌	824–816	Son of Duke Wu	Killed by supporters of Duke Hu's son.
10	Duke Wen 齊文公	Chi 赤	815–804	Son of Duke Li	
11	Duke Cheng 齊成公	Yue 說	803–795	Son of Duke Wen	
12	Duke Zhuang I 齊前莊公	Gou 購	794–731	Son of Duke Cheng	Reigned for 64 years
13	Duke Xi 齊僖公	Lufu 祿甫	730–698	Son of Duke Zhuang I	
14	Duke Xiang 齊襄公	Zhu'er 諸兒	697–686	Son of Duke Xi	Committed incest with sister Wen Jiang, murdered her husband Duke Huan of Lu, conquered the state of Ji, murdered by cousin Wuzhi
15	none	Wuzhi 無知	686	Cousin of Duke Xiang, grandson of Duke Zhuang I	Killed by Yong Lin.
16	Duke Huan 齊桓公	Xiaobai 小白	685–643	Younger brother of Duke Xiang	First of the Five Hegemons, when Qi reached zenith of its power. Starved to death by ministers
17	none	Wukui or Wugui 無虧 or 無詭	643	Son of Duke Huan	Killed by supporters of Duke Xiao
18	Duke Xiao 齊孝公	Zhao 昭	642–633	Son of Duke Huan	Crown prince of Qi
19	Duke Zhao 齊昭公	Pan 潘	632–613	Son of Duke Huan	His supporters murdered the son of Duke Xiao
20	none	She 舍	613	Son of Duke Zhao	Murdered by uncle Shangren
21	Duke Yì 齊懿公	Shangren 商人	612–609	Uncle of She, son of Duke Huan	Killed by two ministers
22	Duke Hui 齊惠公	Yuan 元	608–599	Son of Duke Huan	Defeated Long Di invaders
23	Duke Qing 齊頃公	Wuye 無野	598–582	Son of Duke Hui	Defeated by Jin at the Battle of An
24	Duke Ling 齊靈公	Huan 環	581–554	Son of Duke Qing	Annexed the State of Lai; defeated by Jin at the Battle of Pingyin, capital Linzi burned
25	Duke Zhuang II 齊後莊公	Guang 光	553–548	Son of Duke Ling	Ascended throne by killing Prince Ya with the help of Cui Zhu; committed adultery with Cui's wife, killed by Cui
26	Duke Jing 齊景公	Chujiu 杵臼	547–490	Half brother of Duke Zhuang II	Killed Cui Zhu. Had famous statesman Yan Ying as prime minister
27	An Ruzi 安孺子	Tu 荼	489	Youngest son of Duke Jing	Deposed by Tian Qi and killed by Duke Dao. Also called Yan Ruzi
28	Duke Dao 齊悼公	Yangsheng 陽生	488–485	Son of Duke Jing	Killed by a minister, possibly Tian Heng
29	Duke Jian 齊簡公	Ren 壬	484–481	Son of Duke Dao	Killed by Tian Heng
30	Duke Ping 齊平公	Ao 驁	480–456	Brother of Duke Jian	
31	Duke Xuan 齊宣公	Ji 積	455–405	Son of Duke Ping	
32	Duke Kang 齊康公	Dai 貸	404–386	Son of Duke Xuan	Deposed by Duke Tai of Tian Qi, died in 379

=== House of Tian ===
Title	Name	Reign (BCE)	Relationship	Notes
Duke Tai 齊太公	Tian He 田和	404–384	Son of Tian Bai	Officially recognized as Qi ruler in 386 BCE
none	Tian Yan 田剡	383–375	Son of Duke Tai	Killed by Duke Huan.
Duke Huan 齊桓公	Tian Wu 田午	374–357	Brother of Tian Yan	
King Wei 齊威王	Tian Yinqi 田因齊	356–320	Son of Duke Huan	Most powerful Qi ruler of the Warring States.
King Xuan 齊宣王	Tian Bijiang 田辟彊	319–300	Son of King Wei	
King Min 齊愍王	Tian Di 田地	300–283	Son of King Xuan	Temporarily declared himself "Emperor of the East".
King Xiang 齊襄王	Tian Fazhang 田法章	283–265	Son of King Min	
none, known as Houzhu of Qi	Tian Jian 田建	264–221	Son of King Xiang	Qi conquered by Qin

== Famous people ==
All dates are BCE

- Chunyu Kun (386–310), official and master scholar at the Jixia Academy.
- Gao Chai, a disciple of Confucius and later minister in the states of Lu and Wey.
- Gongyang Gao, a disciple of Confucius and the writer of the Gongyang Zhuan.
- Guan Zhong (720–645), prime minister to Duke Huan of Qi and known for making the state of Qi one of the most power Hegemons at the time.
- Mencius (372–289), official and one of the most renowned Confucian philosophers.
- Sima Rangju, famous general
- Sun Bin (?–316), military strategist known for Sun Bin's Art of War.
- Sun Tzu (544–496) Chinese strategist and writer, famously attributed authorship of The Art of War. May not have existed.
- Tian Heng, who engineered the Tian clan's takeover of Qi.
- Xun Kuang (313–238), philosopher who joined the Jixia Academy when he was 50 years old, known for the Xunzi.
- Yan Ying (578–500), prime minister to Duke Jing, known from Yanzi Chunqiu, to which he is sometimes attributed authorship.
- Yin Wen (350–284), Jixia Academy scholar and School of Names philosopher whose ideas would influence King Xuan, King Min, and Gongsun Long.
