= Guan Zhong =

Chinese chancellor and reformer (c. 720–645 BC)

Guan Zhong 管仲
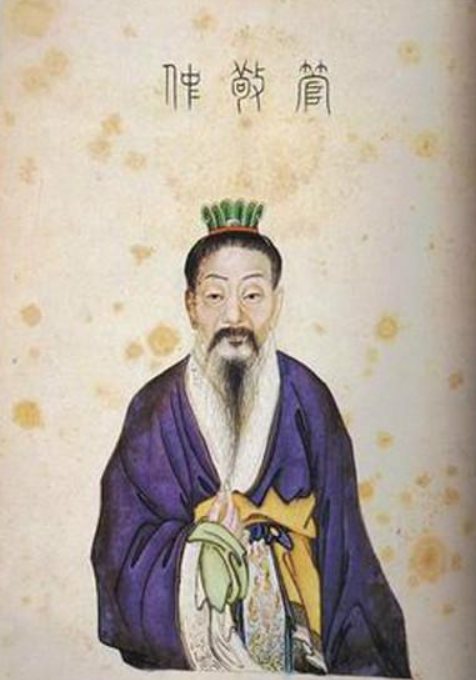
- Born: 720 BC; Yingshang County, Anhui
- Died: 645 BC (aged 75); Shandong
- Other name: Yiwu (夷吾)
- Occupations: Politician, philosopher
- Notable work: Guanzi

Guan Zhong
- Chinese: 管仲
Transcriptions
Standard Mandarin
- Hanyu Pinyin: Guǎn Zhòng
- Wade–Giles: Kuan^{3} Chung^{4}
- IPA: [kwàn ʈʂʊ̂ŋ]
Yue: Cantonese
- Yale Romanization: Gún Juhng
- Jyutping: Gun^{2} Zung^{6}
Southern Min
- Tâi-lô: Kńg Tiōng
Old Chinese
- Baxter–Sagart (2014): *[k]ˤo[n]ʔ N-truŋ-s

Guan Zhong (Chinese: 管仲; Wade–Giles: Kuan Chung; c. 720–645 BC) was a Chinese philosopher and politician. He served as chancellor and was a reformer of the State of Qi during the Spring and Autumn period of Chinese history. His given name was Yiwu (Chinese: 夷吾; pinyin: Yíwú). Zhong was his courtesy name. He is mainly remembered for his reforms as chancellor under Duke Huan of Qi, as well as his friendship with his colleague Bao Shuya, though his reputation remained controversial among the Confucians, as detailed in the appraisal section.

Through Guan Zhong's reforms and skilful diplomacy Qi became the most powerful of the feudal states and Duke Huan became the first of the Five Hegemons. Though knowledge of his reforms is limited, in particular he instituted a famous fiscal policy known as "balancing the light and the heavy", associated with salt and iron monopolies. Otherwise a diverse work, the Guanzi compilation making use of his name makes similar such recommendations.

== Life ==
=== Youth and friendship with Bao Shuya ===
Guan Zhong, a descendant of either Shu Xian of Guan or King Mu of Zhou, was born in Yingshang, and became acquainted with Bao Shuya at an early age, when they became business partners. The Shiji records that, as partner, Guan Zhong often took more than his share of the profits, in effect cheating Bao Shuya. Bao, however, recognised his impoverished background and was not offended.

=== Tutors of different princes ===
Subsequently, Guan Zhong was appointed tutor to Prince Jiu, the younger brother of the ruling Duke Xiang of Qi. Bao Shuya, meanwhile, became tutor to Jiu's younger brother, Prince Xiaobai.

In 686 BC, Duke Xiang was murdered in a palace coup by two of his ministers, who then installed Gongsun Wuzhi, a scion of the ducal house, as the new Duke. Recognising that they were in mortal danger, both Prince Jiu and Prince Xiaobai fled with their respective tutors. Prince Jiu fled to the State of Lu, while Prince Xiaobai went to the State of Ju.

=== Becoming chancellor ===
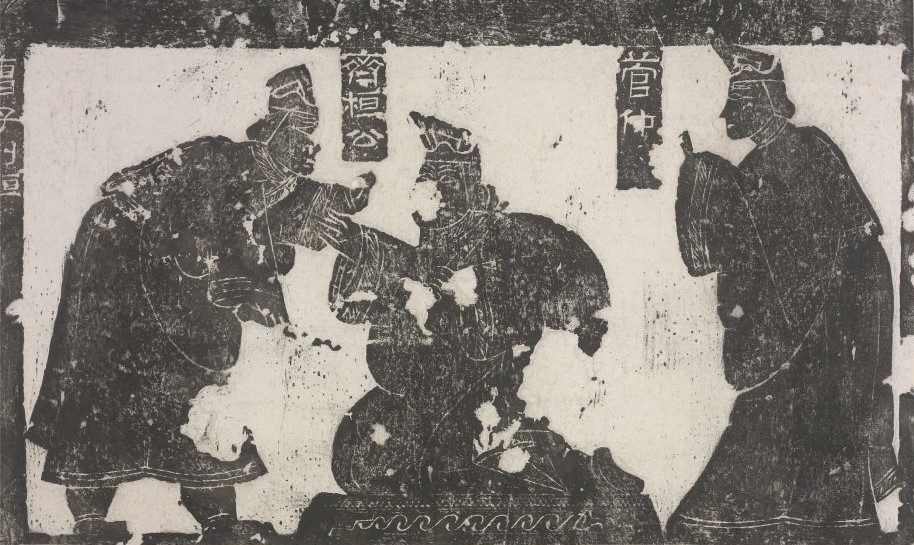
A Portrait of Guan Zhong from a segment of Wu family shrines stone-relief (on the right)

In 685 BC, Gongsun Wuzhi himself was killed in another palace coup, and the ministers of Qi sent envoys to Ju, hoping to receive Prince Xiaobai back and succeed to the duchy. On hearing of this, Lu also sent Prince Jiu towards Qi, while Guan Zhong intercepted Prince Xiaobai to prevent his return. In the resulting conflict, Guan Zhong shot an arrow at Xiaobai which hit his belt buckle. Xiaobai pretended to cough blood and collapse, tricking Guan Zhong into thinking he was mortally wounded.

Eventually, Xiaobai won the race back to Qi, and was installed as Duke. The State of Lu attempted to enforce Prince Jiu's claim, but was defeated in battle, after which Qi forced Lu to execute Prince Jiu and send Guan Zhong back as a prisoner. Xiaobai originally wanted to execute Guan Zhong as well, but Bao Shuya strongly recommended sparing him and elevating him to chancellor, even though that meant he would outrank Bao himself. Xiaobai was eventually convinced.

=== Domestic reforms ===
Duke Huan had inherited a state in turmoil, after three years of civil wars and usurpation had severely depleted the treasury. As Chancellor, Guan Zhong instituted extensive reforms aimed at organising and strengthening the Qi state.

Administratively, the capital was divided into 21 districts: six of merchants, which provided the Qi state's trade revenue, and fifteen of attendants, which provided the core of the Qi army. Similarly, the population outside the capital was organised: 30 households were formed into one village, 10 villages as one troop, 10 troops as one district, 3 districts as one county, and counties grouped into five regions. Administrators were appointed at every level, with the regional administrators reporting on their jurisdictions to the Duke every year.

Economically, Guan Zhong disbanded the well-field system instituted since the Zhou dynasty; instead, all land was to be taxed according to its productivity. At the same time, Qi's coastal position was exploited through the expansion of fisheries and salt production, while trade was encouraged through certain privileges. For instance, people bearing goods to market on foot, and carriages arriving empty at markets to make purchases, were not subject to tolls; this encouraged the use of the state-managed markets.

Guan Zhong wrote that because taxation would reduce the people's wealth and make them dislike the government, it was better to obtain revenue by monopolizing the sale of salt, iron, forest products, and ore. Thus, these "goods of the mountains and seas" (namely iron and salt) should be state managed. Similarly, a price-regulation scheme existed for food, with granaries buying grain in bounty years to be released into the market in lean years. Finally, coinage was also unified to encourage trade within Qi.

== Appraisal ==
Guan Zhong would ultimately be identified with the Legalist school as a result of his administrative reforms. Though actually legalistic philosophy did not develop until hundreds of years later, R. Eno of Indiana University does consider that "If one were to trace the origins of Legalism as far back as possible, it might be appropriate to date its beginnings to the prime ministership of Guan Zhong, chief aide to the first of the hegemonic lords of the Spring Autumn period, Duke Huan of Qi (r. 685–643)."

He is said to have indulged in a luxurious lifestyle, and did not equate a ruler's moral purity with his ability to govern. Duke Huan, who loved hunting and women, asked Guan if these indulgences would harm his hegemony, to which Guan replied that the ruler's love for luxury would not harm his hegemony. It would only be harmed through inappropriate staffing and misuse of talent. One passage "recounts" Confucius as considering him "mediocre" for his lack of frugality and knowledge of ritual.

Despite all this, he might be considered, "at least in most respects" an "ideal Confucian minister". Guan Zhong is reported to have advised Duke Huan: 'Summon the wavering with courtesy and cherish the remote with virtuous conduct. So long as your virtuous conduct and courtesy never falter, there will be no one who does not cherish you.'" When Duke Huan was approached to dethrone the ruling clans of his state, Guan Zhong advised him that he had won their adherence through politeness (li) and trustworthiness (xin).

When Confucius's students criticized Guan Zhong as lacking propriety, crediting his ambition and achievement Confucius said of him that "It was due to Guan Zhong that Duke Huan was able to assemble the feudal lords on numerous occasions without resorting to the use of his war chariots. Such was his goodness! ... Through having Guan Zhong as his minister Duke Huan became protector over the feudal lords. He brought unity and order to the entire realm so that even today people enjoy his gifts to them ... I am afraid that without Guan Zhong we would be folding our lapels right-over-left (traditional Chinese clothing customarily is folded left-over-right)."

The students of Confucius also posted a question whether Guan Zhong followed Ren (Confucian humaneness) or not. However, in pre-Qin period, "Ren" has a distinctive utilitarian definition. Hence, from this standpoint, Guan Zhong followed "Ren".

== Achievements ==
Guan Zhong started multiple reforms in the State of Qi. Politically, he centralized power and divided the state into different villages, each carrying out a specific trade. Instead of relying on the traditional aristocracy for manpower, he applied levies to the village units directly. He also developed a better method for choosing talent to be governors. Under Guan Zhong, Qi shifted administrative responsibility from hereditary aristocrats to professional bureaucrats. He is also credited for creating the first official government sponsored brothel known as "女市" which funded the government treasury.

During his term of office, the State of Qi became much stronger. The Zuo Zhuan records that in 660 BC, Guan Zhong urged Duke Huan of Qi to attack the small neighboring State of Xing which was under attack from Quan Rong nomads, a non-Chinese Rong tribes. Later, in 652 BC he advised the duke not to ally with a vassal ruler's son who wished to depose his father. Duke Huan often listened to Guan Zhong's sound advice such that his status amongst other Zhou vassal states rose. As a result, the duke came to be recognized as the first Hegemon or leader of the vassal alliance.

In recognition of Guan Zhong's service, Duke Huan gave him the honorary title of "Godfather" (仲父). The same title was later given to Lü Buwei by Prince Zheng, the future Qin Shi Huang.

=== State Monopoly on Salt and Iron ===
Under Guan's guidance several important economic reforms were introduced. He created a uniform tax code and also used state power to encourage the production of salt and iron.

He believed that monopolizing the nature resources was helpful on improving the government income, with fewer complaints from the public than raising taxes. The strategy was described by himself to the Duke of Huan as "managing the mountain and the sea（官山海)", which mainly refers to iron mine from the mountain and salt from the sea. Under his policy, private business who produce salt by boiling seawater and iron by mining must sell all outputs to the government, and the government resell refined salt and iron products, with huge price gap, to all household in State of Qi.

Historians usually credit Guan Zhong for introducing state monopolies controlling salt and iron.

=== Qi-Hengshan War ===
In the record of Guanzi Chapter 84, Duke of Huan wanted to restrain the threat from State of Hengshan (衡山国) and asked Guan for solution. State of Hengshan was famous for its weapon production. Guan then ordered officials to buy arms from State of Hengshan in large quantities. After ten months, worrying that the price will continuously grow up, State of Yan, State of Dai and later State of Qin followed up the buying. The price then jumped sharply and, as a result, almost all household in State of Hengshan switched to make weapons instead of farming. One year later, Guan ordered officials to buy rice from State of Zhao, at a price more than three times higher than normal. By seeing the potential huge profit, State of Hengshan sold its rice inventory to officials from State of Qi. Afterwards, Guan suddenly ordered State of Qi's army to invade State of Hengshan. With selling out of weapon and rice, State of Hengshan soon surrendered.

Some historians marked Qi-Hengshan War the early form of Economic Warfare.

=== Publications ===
He composed the Guanzi encyclopedia, officially compiled by the Jixia Academy during the Warring States period.

== In popular culture ==
Guan Zhong is one of 32 historical personages featured in the Koei game Romance of the Three Kingdoms XI, where he is referred to as Guan Yiwu.
