= She (Qi) =

Lü She 呂舍

Ruler of Qi
- Reign: 613 BC
- Predecessor: Duke Zhao
- Successor: Duke Yi
- Died: 613 BC
Names
- Ancestral name: Jiāng (姜); Clan name: Lǚ (呂); Given name: Shě (舍)
- House: Jiang
- Dynasty: Jiang Qi
- Father: Duke Zhao
- Mother: Zi Shu Ji (子叔姬)

Lü She (Chinese: 呂舍; pinyin: Lǚ Shě), also known as "She, Marquess of Qi" (齊侯舍) or "She, Lord of Qi" (齊君舍), was the 20th ruler of the Jiang Qi state for two months until his death in 613 BC.

He was the son of Duke Zhao, who died in the fifth month of 613 BC after 20 years of reign. He succeeded his father as ruler of Qi, but was murdered just two months later by his uncle, Duke Zhao's younger brother, Duke Yi, who then usurped the throne.

She House of Jiang Died: 613 BC
Regnal titles
| Preceded by Duke Zhao of Qi | Duke of Qi; 613 BC | Succeeded by Duke Yì of Qi |
