= Duke Xiang of Song =

Duke of Song from 650 to 637 BC

Duke Xiang of Song 宋襄公
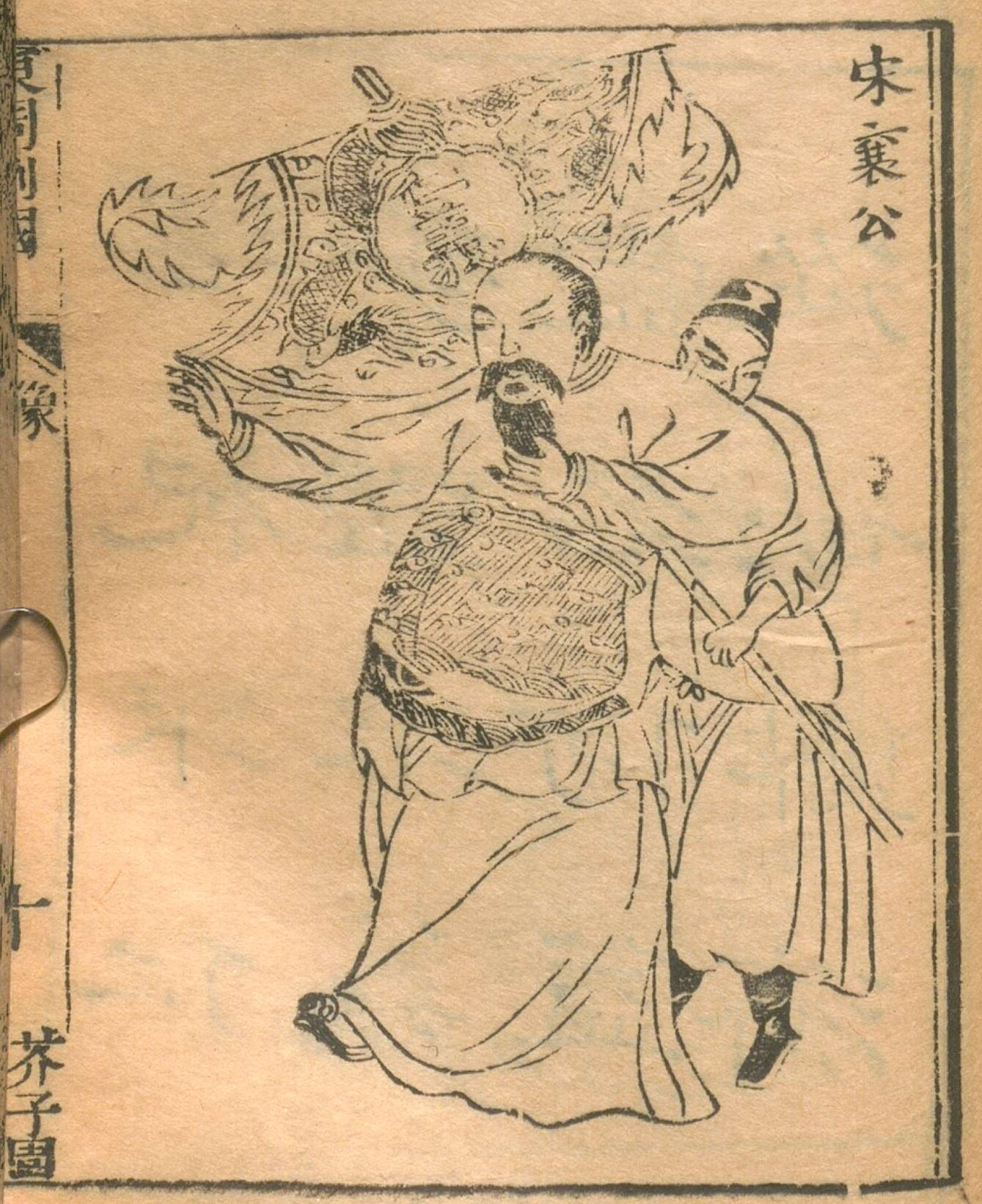

Duke of Song
- Reign: 650–637 BC
- Predecessor: Duke Huan I
- Successor: Duke Cheng
- Issue: Duke Cheng of Song
Names
- ancestral name Zǐ (子) clan name Sòng (宋); Given name Zīfǔ (茲甫)
- Father: Duke Huan I of Song

Duke Xiang of Song (宋襄公) (died 637 BC) was the leader in the state of Song in the Spring and Autumn period. His personal name was Zifu (子茲甫) and he took his throne in 650 BC.

After the death of the Hegemon of China, Duke Huan of Qi, in 643 BC, Duke Xiang intervened in the War of Qi's succession on the behalf of his ally Prince Zhao. Forming an alliance with Cao, Wey, and Zou, Duke Xiang and his troops invaded Qi and eventually defeated Prince Zhao's rival brothers, crowning him as "Duke Xiao of Qi". With his influence on the rise, Duke Xiang saw a chance to become the next hegemon of China and made war with Chu. In 641 BC, he made a covenant with Cao and Zhu, two small states. Then he ordered the viscount of Zeng to be sacrificed as a victim, because the later came too late for their first covenant, though he appeared in their another covenant. In 638 BC he attacked the state of Zheng and met the troops from Chu, who were running to save Zheng. Instead of giving the enemy a surprise attack, he waited for the enemy to go across the river in order to display his benevolence or Ren (仁) as a Junzi. In the Battle of Hongshui (泓水之戰) against the much stronger and fully prepared enemy, Duke Xiang's troops were defeated thoroughly and he himself was badly hurt. He died in the following year and was succeeded by his son Wangchen known as Duke Cheng of Song.

Despite his failure in expansion, he is considered one of the Five Hegemons by some historians.

Mao Zedong once said about Duke Xiang's humanity in war: "We are not Duke Xiang of Song and have no use for his idiotic virtue and morality".

== Family ==
Wives:

- Wang Ji, of the Ji clan of Zhou (王姬), a daughter of King Hui of Zhou and an elder sister of King Xiang of Zhou

Sons:

- Prince Wangchen (公子王臣; d. 620 BC), ruled as Duke Cheng of Song from 636 to 620 BC
- Prince Yu (公弟禦; d. 620 BC), ruled as the Duke of Song in 620 BC
