= Cho-yun Hsu =

Taiwanese-American historian (1930–2025)

- 許倬雲
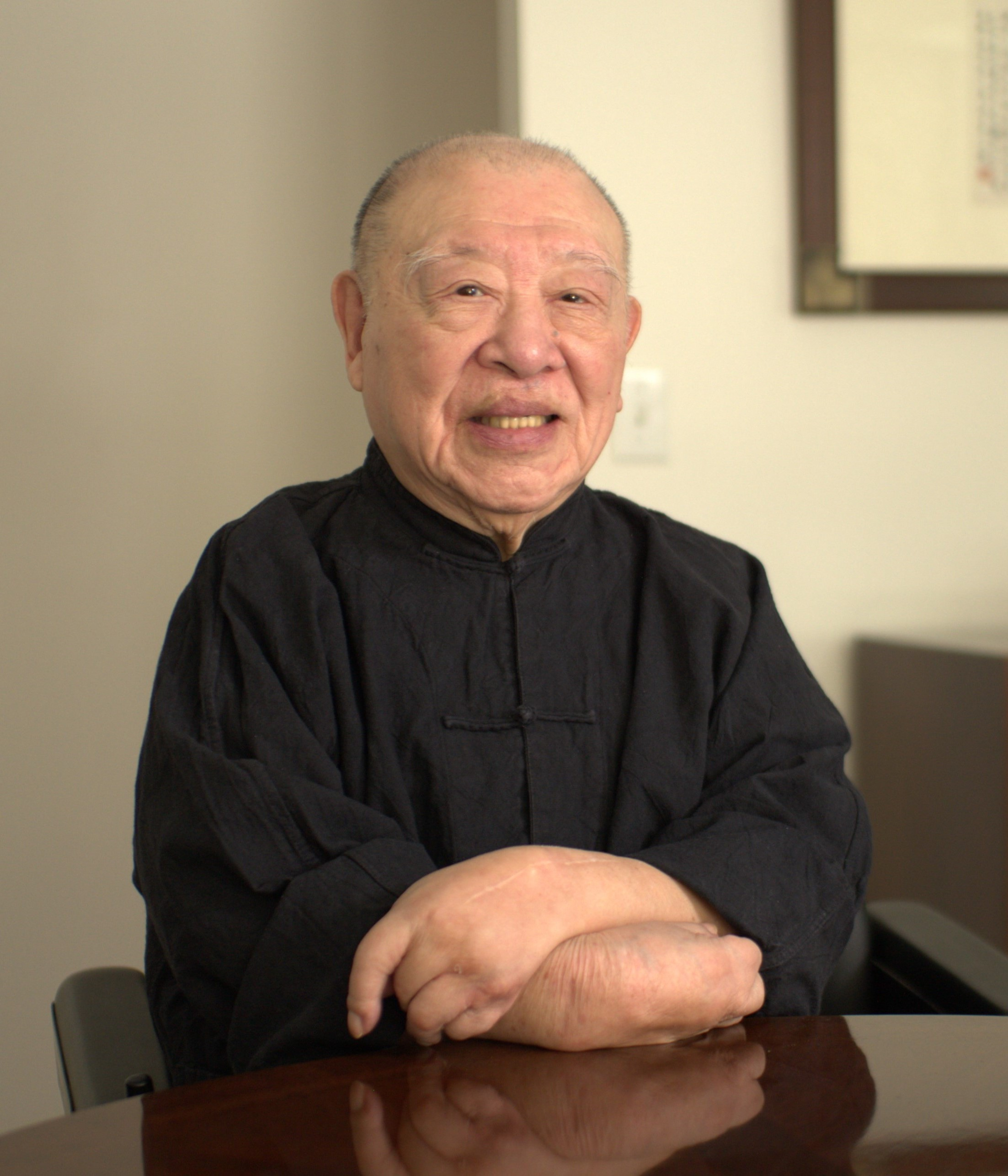
- Born: 3 September 1930; Xiamen, China
- Died: 3 August 2025 (aged 94); Pittsburgh, Pennsylvania, U.S.
- Education: National Taiwan University (BA, MA); University of Chicago (PhD)
- Occupations: Historian and Sinologist
- Employer: University of Pittsburgh
- Awards: Tang Prize (2024)
- Honours: University Professor Emeritus

Chinese name
- Traditional Chinese: 許倬雲
- Simplified Chinese: 许倬云
Transcriptions
Standard Mandarin
- Hanyu Pinyin: Xǔ Zhuōyún
- Wade–Giles: Hsü^{3} Cho^{1}-yün^{2}
- IPA: [ɕỳ ʈʂwǒ.y̌n]
Southern Min
- Tâi-lô: Khóo Toh-hûn

Cho-yun Hsu (Chinese: 許倬雲; pinyin: Xǔ Zhuōyún; 3 September 1930 – 3 August 2025) was a Taiwanese-American historian and sinologist. He was a professor of history at the University of Pittsburgh.

== Early life and education ==
Hsu was born in Xiamen, China, in 1930 to a family whose ancestral home was in Wuxi. Fleeing the Chinese Civil War, Hsu moved with his parents to Taiwan during the Great Retreat in 1948. He graduated from National Taiwan University with a Bachelor of Arts (B.A.) and a Master of Arts (M.A.) in history in 1953 and 1956, respectively. In 1957, Hsu migrated to the United States to study for a doctorate at the University of Chicago, where he resided at the Chicago Theological Seminary and earned his Ph.D. in 1962. His dissertation, "Ancient China in Transition," was later published as a book.

== Academic career ==
After receiving his doctorate, Hsu held academic positions in Academia Sinica in Taiwan (1956–1971) then moved to University of Pittsburgh in 1970. He was elected as a Member of the Academica Sinica in 1980. In 2024 he received the Tang Prize in the field of Sinology.

Hsu's scholarly works have been largely on Chinese history, emphasizing on cultural history, socio-economic history and ancient Chinese history. He was noted for his utilization of scientific methods and theories from social sciences. His major works include Western Chou Civilization (1990 Yale University Press), Ancient China in Transition (1965 Stanford University Press), and Han Agriculture (1980 University of Washington Press). His work in Chinese Wangu jianghe (2009 Echo), translated into English as China: A New Cultural History (2012 Columbia University Press), narrates the full course of development of Chinese culture in the perspective of globalization.

Hsu was also known for his advocacy and advisory work during the democratic transition in Taiwan. After earning his doctorate, Hsu returned to start his academic career, fulfilling a promise to his mother, his alma mater National Taiwan University, and the Academia Sinica. While working in Taiwan, Hsu and Herbert Ma recruited many humanities and social science scholars to train Taiwanese academics. He was an Emeritus Professor of History and Sociology at the University of Pittsburgh where he taught from 1970 until his retirement in 1998, and served in honorary positions in several universities including Duke University, Nanjing University, and Chinese University of Hong Kong. Hsu was a contributing columnist for Chinese newspapers including China Times, United Daily News in Taiwan and Southern City News System in China．

Hsu was one of the founding members of the Chiang Ching-kuo Foundation for International Scholarly Exchange, and served as chair of its North American Committee beginning in 1989. During the 1990s, he was instrumental in providing funding to a number of universities and colleges to establish teaching positions on Chinese studies. He oversaw a gradual shift in the Foundation's grants from established scholars to young scholars. Hsu recommended CCK Foundation grants to libraries to catalog rare Chinese books and to digitize historic maps of East Asia.

== Death ==
Hsu died 3 August 2025, at the age of 94.

== Books ==
Hsu authored or coauthored numerous publications:

- Ancient China in Transition: an Analysis of Social Mobility, 722–222 B.C. (Stanford Calif.: Stanford University Press, 1965; paperback edition, 1968)
- Sir Herbert Butterfield, Cho Yun Hsu and William H. McNeill on Chinese and World History, ed. with introd. and three essays by *Noah Edward Fehl (Hong Kong: Chinese University of Hong Kong, 1970)
- Han Agriculture: the Formation of Early Chinese Agrarian Economy, 206 B.C.–A.D. 220, ed. Jack L. Dull (Seattle: University of Washington Press, 1980)
- Bibliographic Notes on Studies of Early China (San Francisco: Chinese Materials Center, 1982)
- Western Chou Civilization, co-authored with Katheryn M. Linduff (New Haven: Yale University Press, 1988)
- Exploring Interpretation in Chinese History (World Scientific Publishing Co., 1996)
- China: A New Cultural History (Columbia University Press, 2012)
