= W. Allyn Rickett =

American historian (1921–2020)

W. Allyn Rickett (October 26, 1921 – April 18, 2020) was an American historian, and a professor emeritus of Chinese and Asian and Middle Eastern studies at the University of Pennsylvania, and a published author, with a partial translation of the Guanzi in 2001, and the first full translation in 2021. Given the substantial length of the Guanzi, it would occupy much of his work as far back as 1960, but also has some early work relating with such subjects as Communist China's then emerging legal system and the May Fourth Movement.

Rickett was earlier an intelligence officer in the Office of Naval Intelligence at the end of World War II. From 1948 he and his wife Adele studied and gathered intelligence in Beijing until they were arrested by the Communists. They spent four years in prison in China and later published a book about their experiences under the title Prisoners of Liberation in 1957. The book was translated into many languages and republished several times during the years.

Rickett died April 18, 2020, aged 98.
