= Five Hegemons =

Historical Chinese rulers

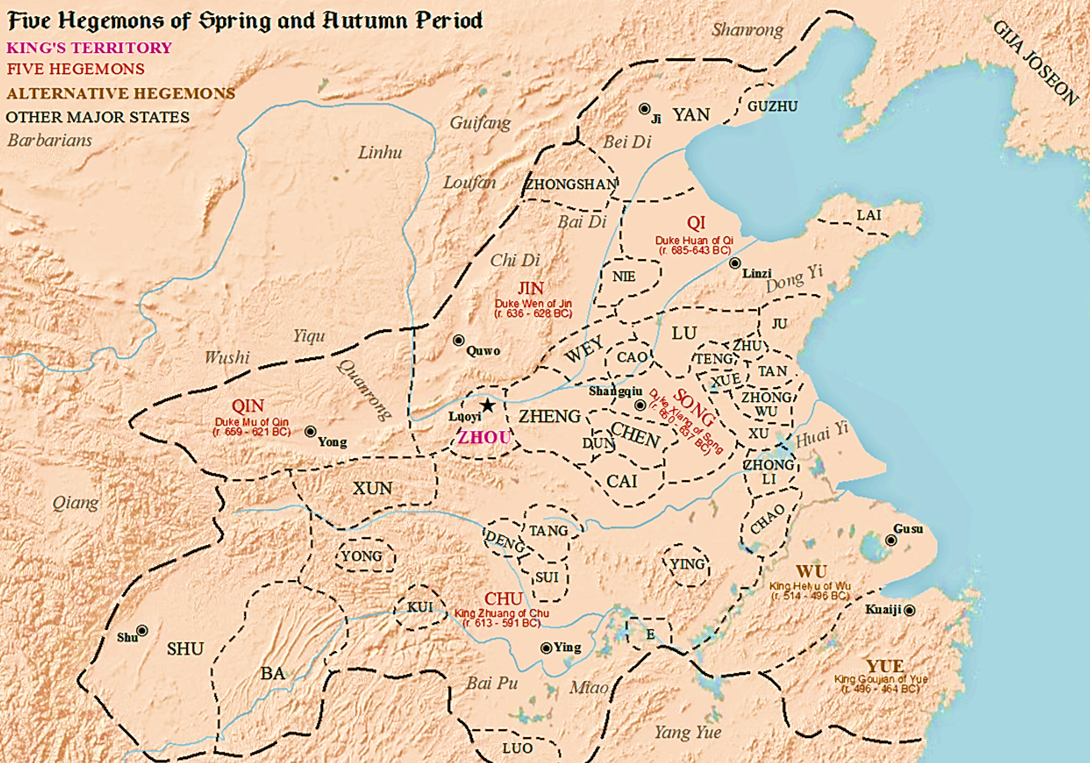
Map of the Five Hegemons during the Spring and Autumn period of the Eastern Zhou dynasty

The Five Hegemons (Chinese: 五霸; pinyin: Wǔ Bà), also referred to as the Five Hegemons of the Spring and Autumn period (Chinese: 春秋五霸; pinyin: Chūnqiū Wǔ Bà), refers to several especially powerful rulers of Chinese states of the Spring and Autumn period of Chinese history (770–476 BCE), sometimes alternatively referred to as the "Age of Hegemons". There are various lists of five hegemon rulers of those certain states which rose to power over the other states of this time period, states which were also formed during the period of dissolution of a once real and strong central state, namely the empire of the Zhou dynasty. The Hegemons mobilized the remnants of the Zhou empire, according to shared mutual political and martial interests. An especially prominent Hegemon was Duke Huan of Qi.

== Pronunciation and meaning ==
In ancient Chinese, 霸 (Old Chinese: *pˤrak-s; Pinyin: bà) 'hegemon' has a similar meaning and pronunciation to 伯 (Old Chinese: *pˤrak; Pinyin: bó), which means 'the eldest son born to the principal wife in a family', or 'senator'. Both 五霸 and 五伯 can be translated as the 'Five Hegemons'. 五 (wu) literally means 'five', but in the context of ancient Chinese also has a more generally qualitative and less precisely quantitative use, implying completeness.

== Use of the term ==
During the Spring and Autumn era itself, the hegemony tended to apply to states; it was therefore possible to speak of the State of Jin and the State of Chu struggling for hegemony over the Zhou states. In historical accounts it instead became associated with individual rulers, namely the ones who first brought their respective states to a dominant position. During the Spring and Autumn period the reigns of each hegemon tended to correspond with the zenith of their state's power.

Timeline of the most prominent hegemons
years in BCE

== The Hegemon System ==
The concept of hegemony arose out of the weakness of the Eastern Zhou dynasty. Whilst its predecessor, the Western Zhou dynasty, was also feudal in nature, the centre was strong enough to command the obedience of most of its vassals, as well as to maintain a central army. The death of King You of Zhou and the sack of the Zhou capital in 771 BC rendered the position of the central court untenable and eventually dependent on the protection of neighbouring states.

The concept of the Hegemon was important to the interstate relations during the Spring and Autumn period, since the Hegemon was nominally charged with underwriting the stability of the whole system, often heading a league of smaller states whose security was to some extent guaranteed by the state, in exchange for tribute.

== The Five Hegemons ==
These are the two most commonly used lists of hegemons.

The Records of the Grand Historian lists:

- Duke Huan of Qi (齐桓公)
- Duke Xiang of Song (宋襄公)
- Duke Wen of Jin (晋文公)
- Duke Mu of Qin (秦穆公)
- King Zhuang of Chu (楚莊王)

Alternatively, the Xunzi lists:

- Duke Huan of Qi
- Duke Wen of Jin
- King Zhuang of Chu
- Helü, King of Wu (吴王闔閭)
- Goujian, King of Yue (越王句踐)

The first two hegemons are widely referred to in primary sources (e.g. Zuo Zhuan) and therefore rarely disputed because Duke Huan of Qi and Duke Wen of Jin themselves were officially rewarded the hegemony by the Zhou kings Xi and Xiang in 679 BCE and in 632 BCE, respectively.

Zuo Zhuan also recognizes Duke Dao of Jin as a hegemon.

Duke Zhuang of Zheng (鄭莊公) and Fuchai King of Wu (吳王夫差) were also amongst the contenders aside of the seven rulers mentioned above.

These lists are:

The Ci Tong (辭通) lists:

- Duke Zhuang of Zheng (鄭莊公)
- Duke Huan of Qi
- Duke Wen of Jin
- Duke Mu of Qin
- King Zhuang of Chu

The Disquisition of Four Masters Discussing Virtue lists:

- Duke Huan of Qi
- Duke Wen of Jin
- Duke Mu of Qin
- King Zhuang of Chu
- Goujian, King of Yue

The Bai Hu Tong lists:

- Duke Huan of Qi
- Duke Wen of Jin
- Duke Mu of Qin
- King Zhuang of Chu
- Helü, King of Wu

Yan Shigu, who comments on the Book of Han, lists:

- Duke Huan of Qi
- Duke Xiang of Song
- Duke Wen of Jin
- Duke Mu of Qin
- Fuchai, King of Wu (吳王夫差)

== See also ==
- Four Lords of the Warring States
