= King Xie of Zhou =

Pretender to throne of Chinese Zhou dynasty (died 750 BCE)

King Xie of Zhou 周攜王
- Reign: 770 – 750 BCE
- Predecessor: King You of Zhou
- Died: 750 BCE
Names
- Ancestral name: Jī (姬); Given name: Yúchén (余臣) or Yú (余)
Posthumous name
- King Xie (攜王) or King Xiehui (攜惠王) or King Hui (惠王)
- House: Ji
- Dynasty: Zhou (Western Zhou)

King Xie of Zhou (died 750 BCE), personal name Ji Yuchen, was a pretender to the throne of the Chinese Zhou dynasty, in the final years of the Western Zhou.

Around 779 BCE King You replaced the then Queen Shen with his concubine Bao Si, whilst at the same time substituting Ji Yijiu (the future King Ping) as crown prince with Bao Si's son, Bofu. Queen Shen's father, the Marquess of Shen was furious at the deposition of his daughter and grandson and mounted an attack. Along with the Zeng state and a band of Quanrong nomads he attacked the Western Zhou capital at Haojing. King You was killed in the assault whereupon the Marquesses of Shen and Zeng, together with Duke Wen of Xu (許文公), enthroned Ji Yijiu as king of Zhou and relocated the capital to Luoyi. At the same time, Ji Han (姬翰), Duke of Guo (虢), conspired with the Quanrong to elevate Ji Yuchen to the Zhou throne. Thus began a period when there existed two parallel Zhou kings, a stalemate brought to an end in 750 BCE when Marquis Wen of Jin killed King Xie of Zhou.

== Documented sources ==
According to the Zuo Zhuan:

As far as King You was concerned, heaven had no pity for him, he was muddle-headed and not up to the job, having used criminal means to obtain the throne. King Xie violated the Mandate of Heaven, the vassal states usurped his power and he moved his capital to Jiaru (郟鄏).

The Xinian Annals (繫年), which were among the recently unearthed Tsinghua Bamboo Slips, gives King Xie's posthumous name as King Hui of Xie (攜惠王) and records him as a younger brother of King You of Zhou.

== Origin of the name ==
Tang dynasty (618–907 CE) scholar Kong Yingda noted that the Bamboo Annals contained the words "Han, Duke of Guo, enthroned Yuchen at Xie" inferring that Xie was a place name. A further scroll in the Bamboo Annals records that Xie was a place although its location is unknown. However, according to Kong Yingda other parts of the Bamboo Annals contradict this suggestion.

The New Book of Tang links Xie with Feng (豐), Qi (岐) and Li (驪) which were parts of the ancient province known as Yong Province (雍州), thus adding weight to the theory that Xie was a location.

== Notes ==
1. This was to the west of the city of Luoyang in present day Henan, a location that would later become the capital of Eastern Zhou.
