= Shen (state) =

Chinese feudal state during Zhou dynasty (841–688 BCE)

Shen 申
- ?–between 688 and 680 BCE
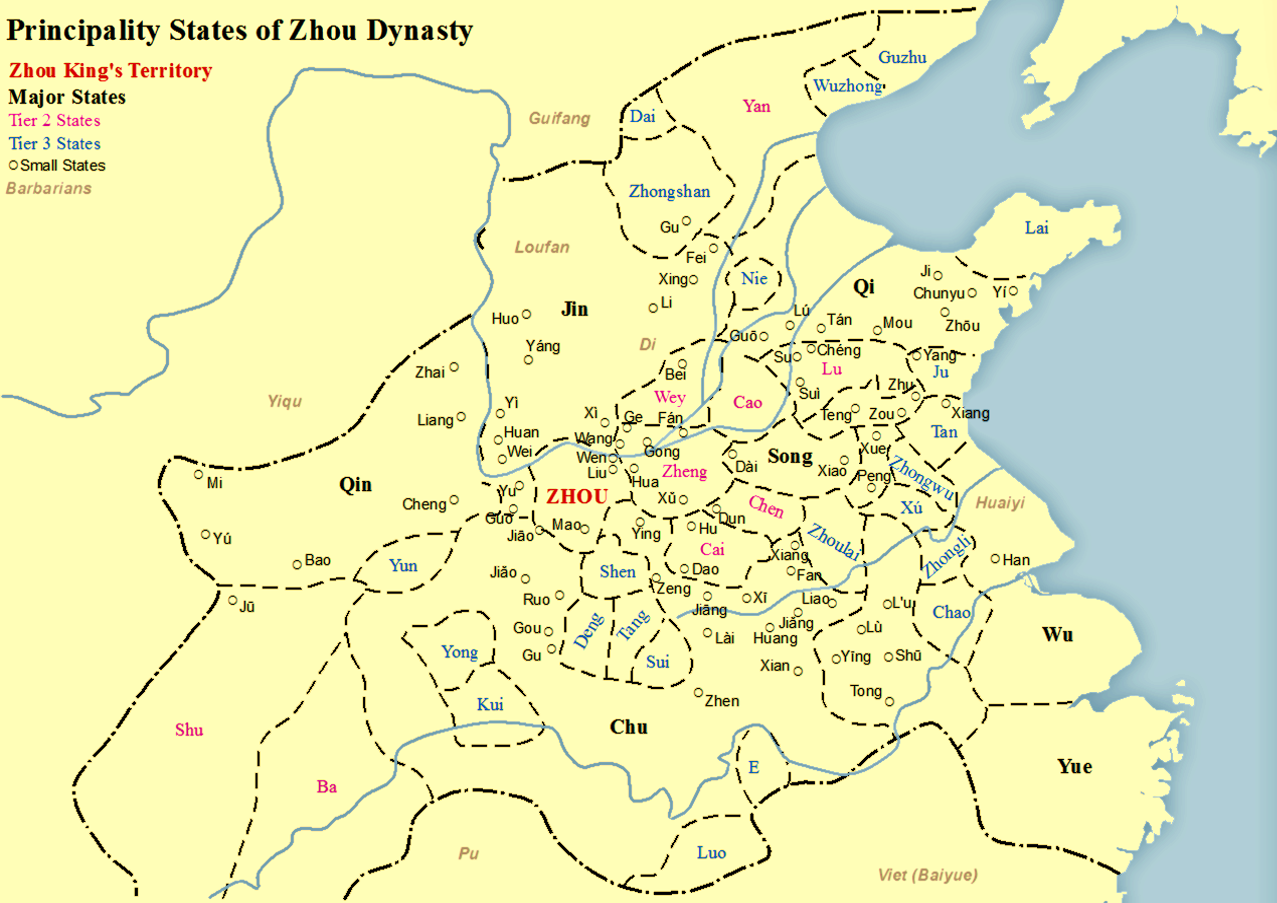
- Shen is a state in the central-south region near Chu
- Capital: Nanyang
- Common languages: Old Chinese
- Government: Monarchy
- History
  - Established: ?
  - Disestablished: between 688 and 680 BCE

Shen (Chinese: 申; pinyin: Shēn) was a vassal state of the Zhou dynasty ruled by the Jiang (姜) family as an earldom. At the beginning of the Spring and Autumn period, the Shen state was annexed by the Chu state and became one of its counties.

== Territory ==
Located around the states of Chén and Zhèng, the State of Shēn lay to the south of modern-day Huáiyáng and Xīnzhèng counties in Henan Province. The state's capital stood in Wăn County (宛县), Nányáng bordered to the north by the Míngè Pass (冥厄關/冥厄关) and to the south by the Huai River.

== History ==
The history of the State of Shen began with the bestowal of the Earldom of Shēn (later a Marquessate) which descended from the matriarchal line of the Zhōu Kings. During the reign of King Xuān of Zhōu (reigned 827 – 782 BCE), the Earl of Shēn was granted the title and lands of King Xuān's maternal uncle in the former State of Xiè (謝國/谢国). The enfeoffed territory of the State of Shen acted as a strategic southern gateway to the lands controlled by the Zhou Kings. King Xuan dispatched Hŭ, the Earl of Shao (召伯虎), to Shen to negotiate with the Earl of Shēn and obtain part of their land for use in the public fields system (公田). The King also sent his close aide Fù Yù (傅御) to relocate the population (the Earl of Shēn's former subjects) in order to rapidly consolidate his control over the area.

King Yōu ascended the throne of Zhōu in 781 BCE. His queen and first wife was the daughter of the Marquess of Shēn. The king's concubine Bāo Sì wanted to oust Crown Prince Yíjiù (宜臼) and replace him with her own son Bófú (伯服) thereby arousing the fury of the Marquess of Shēn. As a result, in 771 BCE the Marquess of Shēn allied with the State of Zēng (繒/缯) along with Quănróng nomads (犬戎) and attacked the Zhōu capital at Hàojīng (鎬京/镐京). King Yōu lit beacons to summon his nobles in defence but none came and he was subsequently killed at the foot of Líshān near modern-day Xī’ān (西安). Thereafter the Marquesses of Shēn and Lŭ (鲁) together with Marquess Wén of Xŭ (许文公) enthroned Yíjiù as King Ping of Zhou in the State of Shēn thereby ushering in the Spring and Autumn period.

In 761 BCE, another daughter of the Marquess of Shēn called Wǔjiāng (武姜) married Duke Wǔ of Zhèng (鄭武公/郑武公). She subsequently gave birth to two sons, the elder of whom, Wùsheng (寤生) would succeed his father as Duke Zhuāng of Zhèng.

During the early years of the Spring and Autumn period the State of Chŭ began to expand. In 688 BCE King Wén of Chŭ (楚文王) dispatched an army to attack the State of Shen. According to the Zuo Zhuan, as the troops passed through the State of Dèng, Marquess Qí of Dèng remarked: King Wén of Chu is the son of my sister. As a result, Marquess Qí allowed him to stop in the State of Shen and provided a feast and entertainment. The officials Zhuīshēng (騅甥/骓甥), Dānshēng (聃甥) and Yǎngshēng (養甥/养甥) asked Marquess Qí to kill King Wén but he would not hear of it whereupon the three officials replied:

This man will be responsible for the death of the State of Dèng. Up to now he has overthrown the State of Shēn and when he returns he will destroy Dèng. It seems like he is biting at our navel and it is too late to form a conspiracy to deal with him. Now is the time to kill King Wen.

After King Wén suppressed the State of Shēn using armed force he became caught up in a war between the State of Deng and the State of Ba. What happened to the State of Shēn after this suppression is not clear.

The "Zuo Zhuan • Fourteenth Year of Duke Ai" traces the establishment of the counties of Shēn and Xī (息), dating the overthrow of the State of Xī to 680 BCE. As a result, the destruction of the State of Shēn must have taken place around the same time – somewhere between 688 and 680 BCE.

After its absorption into the State of Chǔ, Shēn became an important northern county. At the Battle of Chéngpú, Chǔ Prime minister Chéng Déchén (成得臣) did not lead the main Chǔ army but a smaller force composed of troops from the counties of Shēn and Xī. As a result, Chéng Déchén lost the battle whereupon King Chéng of Chŭ said If you return home, what will the elders of the counties of Shēn and Xī do?

In 594 BCE, King Zhuāng of Chŭ agreed to confer territory in the counties of Shēn and Lŭ on Zĭchong (子重). The king's senior official Wū Chén (巫臣) remonstrated with him:

Xī and Lŭ are important Chŭ strategic northern frontier areas and a recruitment base for troops. If you confer these territories on Zĭchong you will no longer have direct control of the area and forfeit your military capability; the States of Jìn and Zhèng will undoubtedly break through the Chŭ frontier and attack our hinterland in the Han River Basin.

In the sixth year of Duke Cheng of Lu (585 CE), the State of Jìn attacked the State of Cài. Chǔ sent troops from Shēn and Xī to assist Cài. The high-ranking military leaders of Jìn knew that if they won this battle it would only mean the defeat of Shēn and Xī counties, not the entire State of Chǔ – if they lost it would be a major humiliation so the army decided to retreat. Academic Gu Jiegang points out that since the two counties of Shēn and Xī had enough troops and were sufficiently powerful to deal with the State of Jin's army, it is clear that the counties were both rich and populous.

Later on, in 529 CE, King Ling of Chu died and King Ping of Chu ascended the throne. During the reign of King Ling, after he had overthrown the State of Cài he had annexed the states of Xŭ, Hú (胡国), Shĕn (沈国), Dào, Fáng (房国) and Shēn, bringing them within the borders of his territory. After King Ping took over the throne of Chŭ, he restored the states of Chén and Cài so that they once more became small countries.

== Records of bronze artifact inscriptions ==
In the 1980s, archaeological excavations around the former Shēn capital of Nanyang uncovered a number of the state's bronze artifacts. These included a bronze sacrificial vessel inscribed with text that scholar Li Xueqin has deciphered as Count of Southern Shen (南申伯). Li further infers that the nobleman referred to is one of those mentioned in the Daya (大雅) section of the Book of Songs in the poem entitled Song Gao (崧高).

== See also ==
- Spring and Autumn period
- State of Deng
- State of Xi

== Notes ==
1. Wan (宛) is still used as an abbreviation for Nanyang.
2. On the border between modern day Guangshui, Hebei and Xinyang, Henan.
