= Fenghao =

Capital of the Western Zhou dynasty of Ancient China

- Location in northern China
- 34.21°N 108.72°E
- Location: China
- Region: Shaanxi

History
- Built: c. 1051 BC
- Abandoned: 771 BC

Fenghao
- Traditional Chinese: 豐鎬 灃鎬
- Simplified Chinese: 丰镐 沣镐
- Literal meaning: Feng & Hao
Transcriptions
Standard Mandarin
- Hanyu Pinyin: Fēnghào
- Wade–Giles: Fêng-hao

Feng
- Traditional Chinese: 豐 灃
- Simplified Chinese: 丰 沣
Transcriptions
Standard Mandarin
- Hanyu Pinyin: Fēng
- Wade–Giles: Fêng

Fengjing
- Traditional Chinese: 豐京 灃京
- Simplified Chinese: 丰京 沣京
- Literal meaning: Lush or Great Capital; Capital on the Feng
Transcriptions
Standard Mandarin
- Hanyu Pinyin: Fēngjīng
- Wade–Giles: Fêng-ching

Fenghao is the modern name for the historical twin cities of Fengjing and Haojing in Ancient China, on the opposite banks of the Feng River, a right bank tributary of the Wei River, about 15 km (9.3 mi) upstream of its confluence with the latter. For three centuries, the two cities served as the capitals of the Zhou state and the Western Zhou dynasty (c. 1046 – 771 BCE) before getting ruined by a barbarian sacking. The archeological sites of the cities are located in modern Chang'an District of Xi'an, Shaanxi province.

== History ==
During the Shang, the Zhou state capital was located in what is now Qishan County between the Wei River and Mount Qi at a location variously described as Qishan (岐山, "Mt. Qi"), Qiyi (岐邑, "Qi City"), Qizhou (岐周, "Zhou at Mt. Qi"), Qixia (岐下, "Below Mt. Qi"), and Zhouyuan (周原, "the Zhou Plain"). In the mid-11th century BC, Lord Ji Chang (posthumously known as King Wen) grew discontented with the rule of Shang's King Di Xin (also known as King Zhòu), but fellow lord Chong Houhu revealed his plans, leading to his subsequent subsequently imprisonment. After making costly bribes and eventually being released, Ji Chang retaliated against Lord Chong, annexing the latter's territories in Guanzhong and constructing a new capital named Chengyi (程邑, "Cheng City") between the Wei and Jing Rivers in present-day Weicheng District, Xianyang. After an extreme drought, he moved his capital further east to the west bank of the Feng River, about 100 kilometers (62 mi) downstream from the old capital at Qiyi. This new city was variously called Feng (豐), Fengxi (豐西) or Fengjing (豐京). This relocation was said to have occurred in the year before Ji Chang's death and five years before the Battle of Muye, placing it c. 1051 BC by current estimates.

After his son Ji Fa (posthumously known as King Wu) defeated the Shang dynasty at Muye and formally established the Zhou dynasty, the administrative capital was moved to the east bank of the river at a site called Hao or Haojing. The two cities formed a twin capital, with Feng continuing to serve as the sites of Zhou ancestral shrine and royal gardens, and Hao hosting the royal palace and government administration.

Both cities were sacked by Quanrong barbarians in 771 BC in the aftermath of the Battle of Mount Li between King You and the rebel Marquis of Shen. The destruction of the capital and the Quanrong invasion of the Wei River valley brought an end to the Western Zhou dynasty, and forced King Ping to relocate the Zhou court eastwards to a new capital at Chengzhou (present-day Luoyang, Henan province) and establish Eastern Zhou dynasty. During the relocation, a minor vassal lord Duke Xiang from the remote Qin clan in Longxi provided protective escort. In gratitude of Duke Xiang's loyalty, King Ping promoted him and promised that any land the Qin clan could capture back from the Quanrong occupiers should become their legitimate fief permanently. The Qin state then spent the next four centuries expanding territories in Guanzhong, eventually conquering all other states and established the first unified dynasty of China. Xianyang, the capital of the Qin dynasty, and Chang'an, the capital of the subsequent Han dynasty (also regarded as the first dynasty of Pax Sinica), were both located near the old sites of Fenghao.

== Ruins ==
The ruins of Fenghao lie in present-day southwest Xi'an in Shaanxi Province. The site was declared an important national cultural heritage site by the State Council of the People's Republic of China in 1961.

== See also ==
- Historical capitals of China

Preceded by Yinxu	Primary capital of China c. 1046–771 BC	Succeeded by Luoyang
