= Western Guo =

Vassal state in China during the Zhou dynasty

Western Guo 西虢
- 1046 BC–687 BC
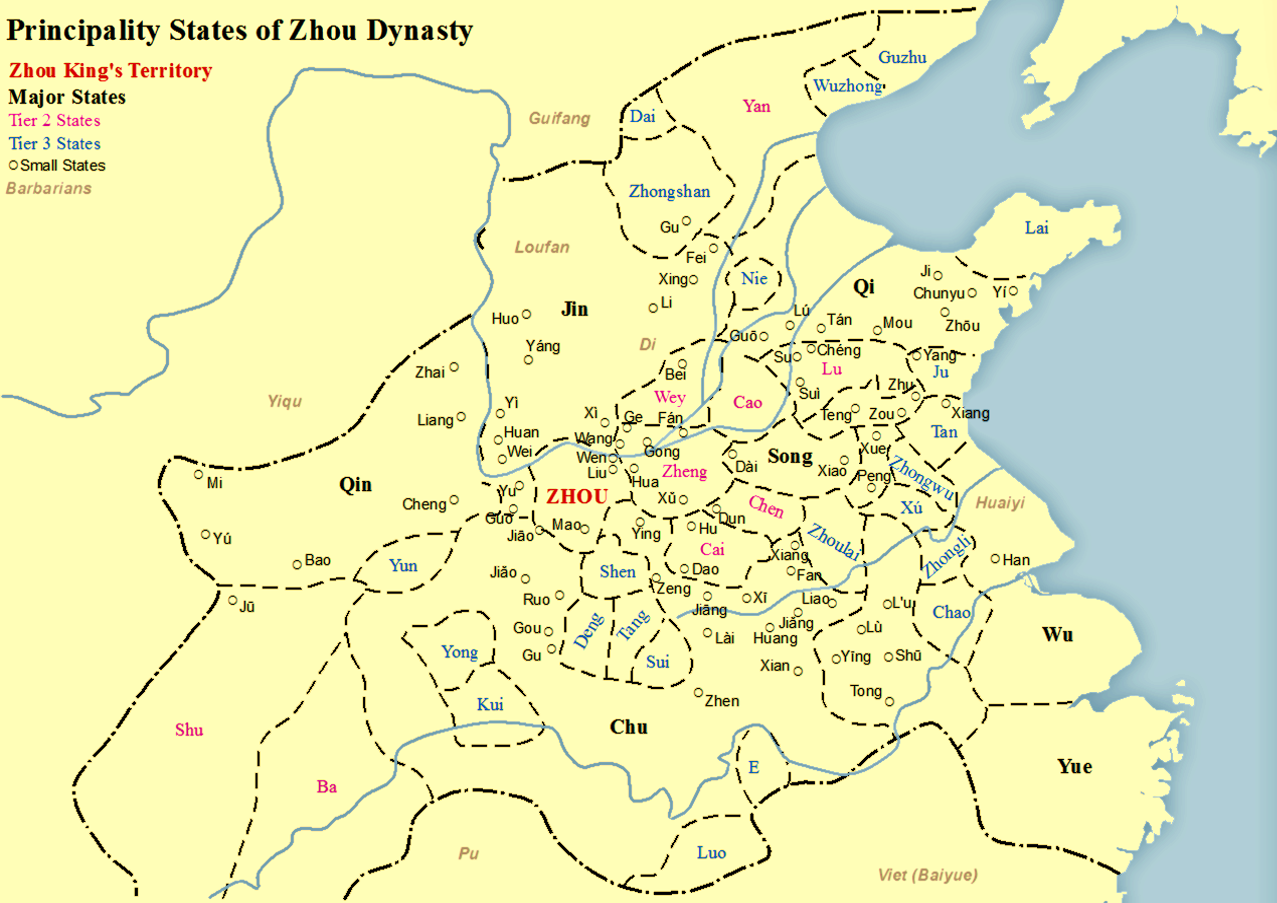
- Western Guo is shown as Guo
- Status: Duchy
- Capital: Yong (雍地); Sanmenxia
- History
  - Established: 1046 BC
  - Disestablished: 687 BC

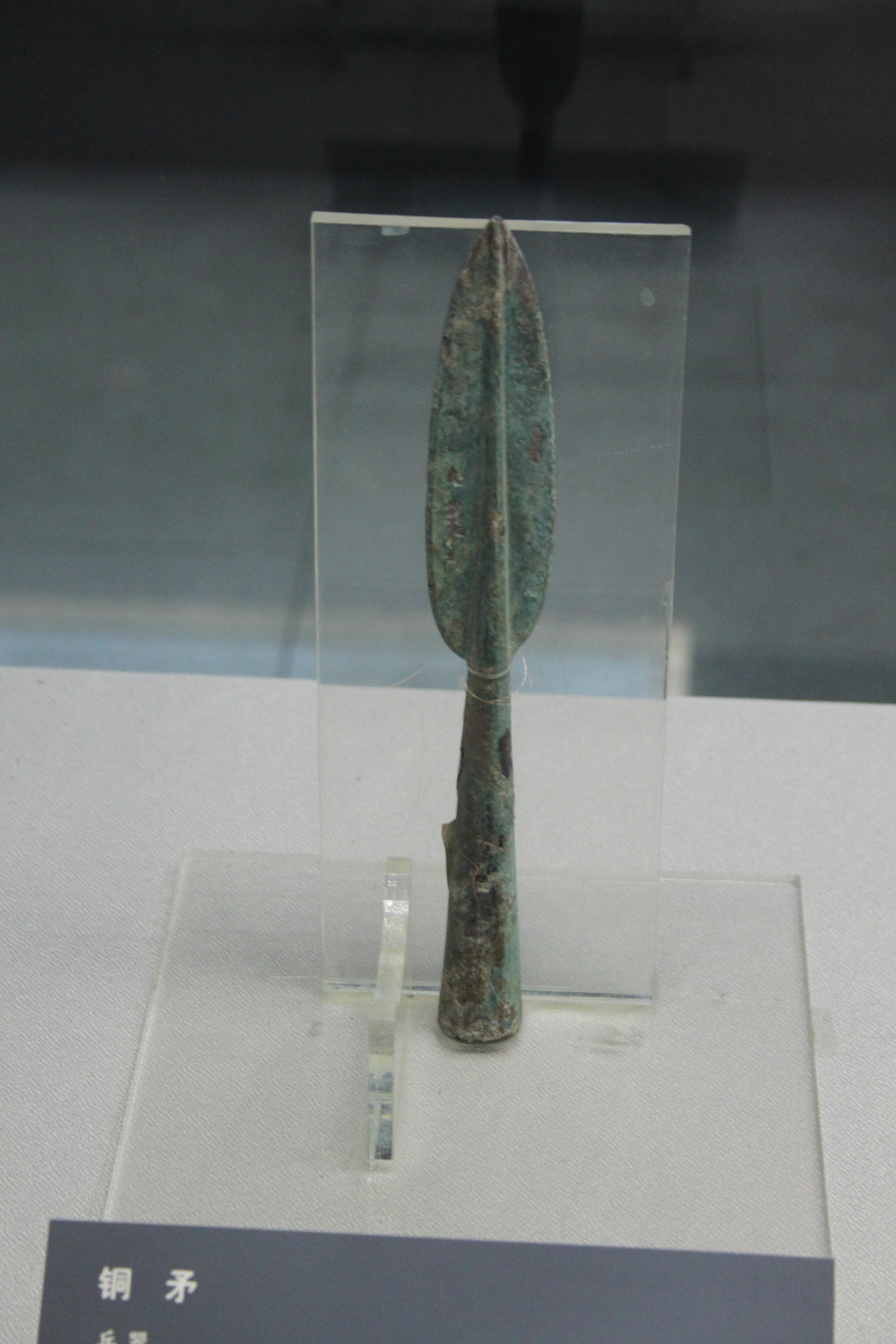
Spearhead from a Guo tomb

Western Guo (Chinese: 西虢; pinyin: Xī Guó) was a vassal state in China during the Zhou dynasty. "Guo" was a kinship group that held at least five pieces of territory within the Zhou realm at various times.

After King Wu of Zhou destroyed the Shang dynasty in 1046 BCE, his uncle Guo Shu received grants of land at Yong. The rulers of Western Guo held administrative positions in the court of the Zhou Kings through successive generations. A branch of Western Guo later founded Eastern Guo.

Due to harassment and invasion by the Quanrong tribes, Western Guo moved eastwards, eventually migrating to today Sanmenxia in the Yellow River valley between Xi'an and Luoyang. A new capital was built at Shangyang (上阳) straddling both banks of the Yellow River. The Shangyang Guo was called "Southern Guo" (南虢) and Xiayang (下阳) "Northern Guo" (北虢). Later chronicles often became confused with the relationships among the various Guo's, but archaeological discoveries support the view that Northern and Southern Guo were both parts of Western Guo.

In 655 BCE, Western Guo was destroyed by the Duke Xian of Jin. (Jin first asked permission of the state of Yu to pass through its territory. After conquering Guo it conquered Yu. This was one of the Thirty-Six Stratagems). The Guo leader Guo Gong Chou fled to the Zhou capital Luoyang along with some of the Guo nobility. Some time later, they arrived in the State of Wen at the home of Guo Gong Chou's father-in-law. Afterwards some of the nobility along with a number of civilians were captured by the Jin Army and taken to the area of what is now Fenyang, Shanxi Province where they became a prominent family with the name Guo. The remainder of the group either settled down in the locality or fled elsewhere.

At the same time, people in Western Guo, with the help of the Qiang people, were attempting to build a new state amongst the ruins of the old one, known historically as Xiao Guo (小虢). This was the last in a total of five states called Guo.

In 687 BCE, during the Spring and Autumn period, the State of Qin wiped out Xiao Guo.

== Rulers ==
Rulers of the State of Western Guo
Name	Other Names	Notes
Guo Shu (虢叔)		Younger brother of King Wen of Zhou
Intermediate Lineage Lost
Duke Cheng of Guo (虢城公)		Contemporary with King Mu of Zhou (reigned c. 976 BC to c. 922 BCE)
Intermediate Lineage Lost
Duke of Guo (虢公)		Contemporary with King Yi of Zhou (reigned c. 885 to c. 878 BCE)
Duke Li of Guo (虢厉公)	Changfu, Duke of Guo (虢公長父) Guo Zhong (虢仲)	In the third year of the reign of King Li of Zhou c. 874 BC-841 Duke Li suppressed the barbarian Huaiyi tribe (淮夷). The move to Sanmenxia begins.
Duke Xuan of Guo (虢宣公)	Guo Ji-zi Bai (虢季子白)	King Xuan of Zhou sent a punitive expedition against the Xianyun tribe (猃狁) and won an overwhelming victory. The move to Sanmenxia continues.
Duke Wen of Guo (虢文公)	Guo Ji (虢季)	Reprimanded by King Xuan of Zhou for failing to register ten thousand mu of land.
Shifu of Guo (虢石父)	Gu, Duke of Guo (虢公鼓)	King You of Zhou's court was rife with corruption.
Han, Duke of Guo (虢公翰)		King Xie of Zhou set up his court at Xieyong (攜擁).
Jifu, Duke of Guo (虢公忌父)		Reinstated as a Titled Retainer (卿士) during the later years of King Ping of Zhou.
Linfu, Duke of Guo (虢公林父)	Guo Zhong (虢仲)	Accompanied King Huan of Zhou during the armed suppression of Duke Zhuang of Zheng.
Chou, Duke of Guo (虢公醜)	Guo Shu (虢叔)	In 655 BCE the State of Western Guo was destroyed by the State of Jin.

== Notes ==
1. Modern day Pinglu County, Shanxi Province
2. Modern day Xiyang City, Henan Province
3. today a prefecture-level city in western Henan Province
4. In the areas of modern day Jiaozuo，Wen County, Henan Province
