= Battle of Mount Li =

771 BC battle

The Battle of Mount Li (Chinese: 驪山; pinyin: Lí Shān) was a military conflict in Ancient China that occurred in 771 BC at the foothills of Mount Li near the twin cities of Haojing and Fengjing, which were Zhou dynasty's capitals at the time. The battle was fought between the royal army of King You of Zhou and the combined rebel armies of the vassal states Shen and Zeng, the latter being supported by the Quanrong barbarians. The outcome was a decisive victory for the rebels, who crushed the royalist army, killed King You and sacked the capital Haojing, and the Western Zhou dynasty collapsed as a result. The surviving Zhou court was forced to migrate eastwards across the Yellow Rivers to a new capital at Luoyi to establish the Eastern Zhou dynasty, thus beginning the Spring and Autumn period.

== Background ==
According to Shiji, King You of Zhou assumed the throne at a very young age. He was married to the daughter of the Marquess of Shen, a Zhou vassal state in charge of dealing with the Xirong, and they had a son named Yijiu. King You was given a new concubine named Bao Si by one of his officers' son in return for his father's release from prison. Bao Si was extremely beautiful and King You favoured her over the queen, which caused major grievances within the court. Later, Bao Si gave birth to a boy called Bofu. King You ultimately deposed his wife and Yijiu in favor of Bao Si and Bofu.

King You was concerned that Bao Si rarely smiled. She showed little interest in music, drink, or anything else. He was in such a state of despair that he summoned all of the court officials and offered a reward of one thousand pieces of gold to anyone who could make the queen laugh. A corrupt officer suggested using the beacon towers of Mount Li to call the armies of the eastern vassal states. King You liked the idea and brought Bao Si in his chariot to the top of the mountain. The beacons were lit and the vassal states sent their armies in a hurry to the capital, where they met in great numbers. (Note: Fire beacons had not yet been invented in China at this point in time.) Messengers were sent to inform them there was in fact no danger. Bao Si was seen laughing as the armies left the mountain foothills in confusion. The king liked it so much that he repeated the ruse many times. One day, however, the Marquess of Shen launched an attack on Zhou, and none of the eastern vassals sent troops to assist the king, culminating in the defeat at Mount Li.

Later historians argued whether the fall of the Western Zhou was caused primarily by Bao Si's machinations, or King You's inability to listen to sound advice and his murder of loyal officials. Recent analysis conducted by Taniguchi Yoshisuke and Jae-hoon Shim look instead at factional divisions within the Zhou court as the reason for its collapse. Continuing this, Li Feng has argued that the origin of the conflict lay in King You's desire to centralize his own power. After forcing senior ministers from his father's reign into retirement, King You further sought to assert his authority by installing a new wife and heir, forcing Yijiu and his mother to move back to Shen. Later, The king sent an army to Shen to demand that the marquess hand over his daughter and grandson. He refused, called upon his allies of Zeng and the Quanrong, defeated the royal army, and marched on Haojing.

== Battle ==
King You ordered his men to light the watchtower beacon fire, and put his minister Guo Shifu in charge of his infantry and Guogong in charge of his chariots and sent them ahead to hold on the enemy. Seeing his numerical disadvantage, Guo Shifu ordered Guogong to tease the enemies and ordered his own regiment to run back to the capital. Guogong was left alone and desperately led his 200 chariots to try to stop the attack, but failed and was killed.

Upon seeing that not a single ally would come to his aid, Duke Huan of Zheng, King You's uncle, summoned his own guard and merged it with the remnants of the royal army, called along all the court ministers and their families and fled the capital with the King through the east gate. Shortly after, the city was taken by the Quanrong, who sacked its riches, enslaved its people and burned down all of its buildings. The Marquess of Shen's men tried to stop the fire to no avail, and went into a desperate search for their lord's daughter. They found her at last in the burning palace and took her out. The forces of Shen refused to persecute the king, so the Quanrong did it alone.

King You's refugees were fleeing hastily eastwards, but the mounted units of the Quanrong began to approach them quickly and surround them from the sides. King You could already see the fort of Mount Li in the horizon when his fellows' wives and children tired out and could follow no longer. Standing already on the foothills of Mount Li, the Zhou people stopped and fell under heavy attack. Duke Huan was slain and King You tried to form up his men, but they were soon annihilated. Bao Si was abducted as trophy for the Quanrong leader.

== Aftermath ==
The battle ended in a decisive victory for Shen. The twin cities were sacked and left in ruins, Bao Si was captured, and Bofu, still a child, was killed in front of her. King You was slain at Mount Li alongside Duke Huan of Zheng. Much of Guanzhong, the heartland of Zhou, was conquered and occupied by the Quanrong. The Marquess of Shen forced Bao Si to become his wife but later freed her. Yijiu was proclaimed King Ping of Zhou, and the capital was eventually moved to Luoyi. (Note: The events immediately following the fall of Haojing are subject to debate due to the recent discovery of the Xinian Manuscript. See the page on the Eastern Zhou for details.)

The death of King You at Mount Li marked the end of the Western Zhou period, thus resulting in the decimation of royal authority and the de facto independence of the various eastern vassal states. When King Ping moved the capital eastwards, Duke Xiang of Qin, the lord of a minor vassal state from Longxi, escorted him to ensure safety along the journey. In gratitude and as a political maneuver to gain new allies, King Ping elevated Duke Xiang's rank and promised him that any land the Qin clan can recapture from Quanrong would become his legitimate fief. The newly promoted state of Qin would continuously fight against the Xirong barbarians for the next four centuries, recapturing the entirety of the Zhou's former Guanzhong heartland and dominating most of the arable lands west of the Dasan Pass. Backed by the vast, fertile hinterland of the Wei River valley and the Loess Plateau, the Qin state would eventually defeat all other states to its east and south, before unifying all of China in 221 BC and establishing the centralized Qin dynasty under the First Emperor.
