= Marquis of Shen (King Ping's grandfather) =

8th-century BCE Qiang ruler of Chinese state of Shen

The Marquis of Shen (Chinese: 申侯; pinyin: Shēnhóu; d. 771 BCE) was a Qiang ruler of the ancient Chinese state of Shen (also known as "West Shen", not to be confused with another Shen state near modern-day Nanyang, Henan Province also known as "South Shen") during ancient China's Zhou dynasty. An important vassal state responsible for guarding the western Guanzhong region against Xirong incursions, the Shen state roughly covered the area of modern-day Mei County in Shanxi Province.

One of the Marquis of Shen's daughters was married to King You as his queen, and gave birth to Crown Prince Yijiu, but another consort named Bao Si gained the favor of the king, who wanted to depose Queen Shen and Crown Prince Yijiu in favor of Bao Si's son Bofu. Furious, the Marquis of Shen allied with the Zeng state and the Quanrong barbarians to attack the Zhou capital Haojing in 771 BCE (Note: According to the New Bamboo Annals (今本) and Xinian, it was in fact King You who first attacked Shen.). King You was defeated and killed at the foot of Mount Li (near modern-day Xi'an), and the capital Haojing was sacked by the Quanrong. Thereafter, the Marquises of Shen, Zeng and Xu enthroned Yijiu as King Ping of Zhou, and the Zhou court was relocated east to Luoyi. This marked the end of the Western Zhou and the beginning of the Eastern Zhou.

During the early reign of King Ping, the Marquis of Shen dominated the politics of the Zhou court with his grandson as the puppet ruler. This led to his political enemies, especially the Duke of Western Guo, to instate a rival king, who remained in opposition until 750 BCE. Despite the Marquis' early prominence during the Eastern Zhou dynasty, other vassal states no longer respected the authority of the weakened Zhou monarchy, and after the Marquis' death the Shen state was later conquered by the newly-risen state of Qin, whose first duke was previously promised by King Ping himself the land ownership of Guanzhong as much as the Qin state could recapture from the Quanrong occupation.
