= Spring and Autumn period =

Period in Chinese history (c. 770 – c. 481 BCE)

- Traditional Chinese: 春秋時代
- Simplified Chinese: 春秋时代
- Hanyu Pinyin: Chūnqiū shídài
Transcriptions
Standard Mandarin
- Hanyu Pinyin: Chūnqiū shídài
- Bopomofo: ㄔㄨㄣ ㄑㄧㄡ ㄕˊ ㄉㄞˋ
- Wade–Giles: Chʻun^{1}-chʻiu^{1} Shih^{2}-tai^{3}
- Tongyong Pinyin: Chunciou shíhdài
- Yale Romanization: Chwūn chyōu shŕdài
- MPS2: Chuēn chiōu shŕdài
- IPA: [ʈʂʰwə́n tɕʰjóʊ ʂǐ.tâɪ]
Yue: Cantonese
- Jyutping: Ceon1 cau1 si4 doi6
- IPA: [tsʰɵn˥ tsʰɐw˥ si˩.tɔj˨]
Middle Chinese
- Middle Chinese: /t͡ɕʰiuɪn t͡sʰɨu d͡ʑɨ dʌi^{H}/
Old Chinese
- Baxter–Sagart (2014): *tʰun tsʰiw [d]ə (~ [d]əʔ) lˤək-s
- Zhengzhang: /*tʰjun sʰɯw djɯ l'ɯːɡs/

Chinese polities in the late 5th century BCE, before the breakup of Jin and the Qin move into Sichuan. The Wei on this map is Wey (衛), not the state of Wei (魏) that arose from the Partition of Jin.

The Spring and Autumn period (c. 770 – c. 481 BCE (Note: There is no academic consensus on the end of the Spring and Autumn period. Criteria differ, but there is general agreement that the Partition of Jin marks the watershed affair of state politically marking the subsequent Warring States period. Common choices include: 481 BCE. Final entry in the Spring and Autumn Annals. Usurpation of Qi by Tian: Tian Heng assassinated his duke along with the duke's advisors and most of his family, confiscating most of their lands.; 479 BCE. Death of Confucius.; 475 or 476 BCE. Accession of King Yuan of Zhou. This is the year chosen by Sima Qian in his deeply influential Records of the Grand Historian, motivated by the dearth of sources available for the following period given Qin Shi Huang's biblioclasm. The initial year of a new king was a methodological convenience. Modern Chinese sources generally prefer this choice.; 453 BCE. Partition of Jin: the clan of Zhi (Chinese: 智), previously the most powerful aristocratic family in Jin, is eliminated at the Battle of Jinyang, leaving only the three clans who would become the successor states of Han, Wei and Zhao.; 403 BCE. Partition of Jin: the successor states are formally recognized by the Zhou king. This year was the choice of Sima Guang, compiler of the Zizhi Tongjian.; Some historians decline to assign a single year as the boundary. Others will choose arbitrarily.)) was a period in Chinese history corresponding roughly to the first half of the Eastern Zhou (c. 771 – 256 BCE), characterized by the gradual erosion of royal power as local lords nominally subject to the Zhou exercised increasing political autonomy. The period's name (Note: The Chinese language does not mark plurals. There is an increasing trend in languages with plural markers to translate the name of this period as "Springs and Autumns", which better conveys the vicissitudes of time. The translation "Spring–Autumn period" also occurs in the literature.) derives from the Spring and Autumn Annals, a chronicle of the state of Lu between 722 and 481 BCE, which tradition associates with Confucius (551–479 BCE).

During this period, local polities negotiated their own alliances, waged wars against one another, up to defying the king's court in Luoyi. The gradual Partition of Jin, one of the most powerful states, is generally considered to mark the end of the Spring and Autumn period and the beginning of the Warring States period. The periodization dates to the late Western Han (c. 48 BCE – 9 CE).

== Background ==
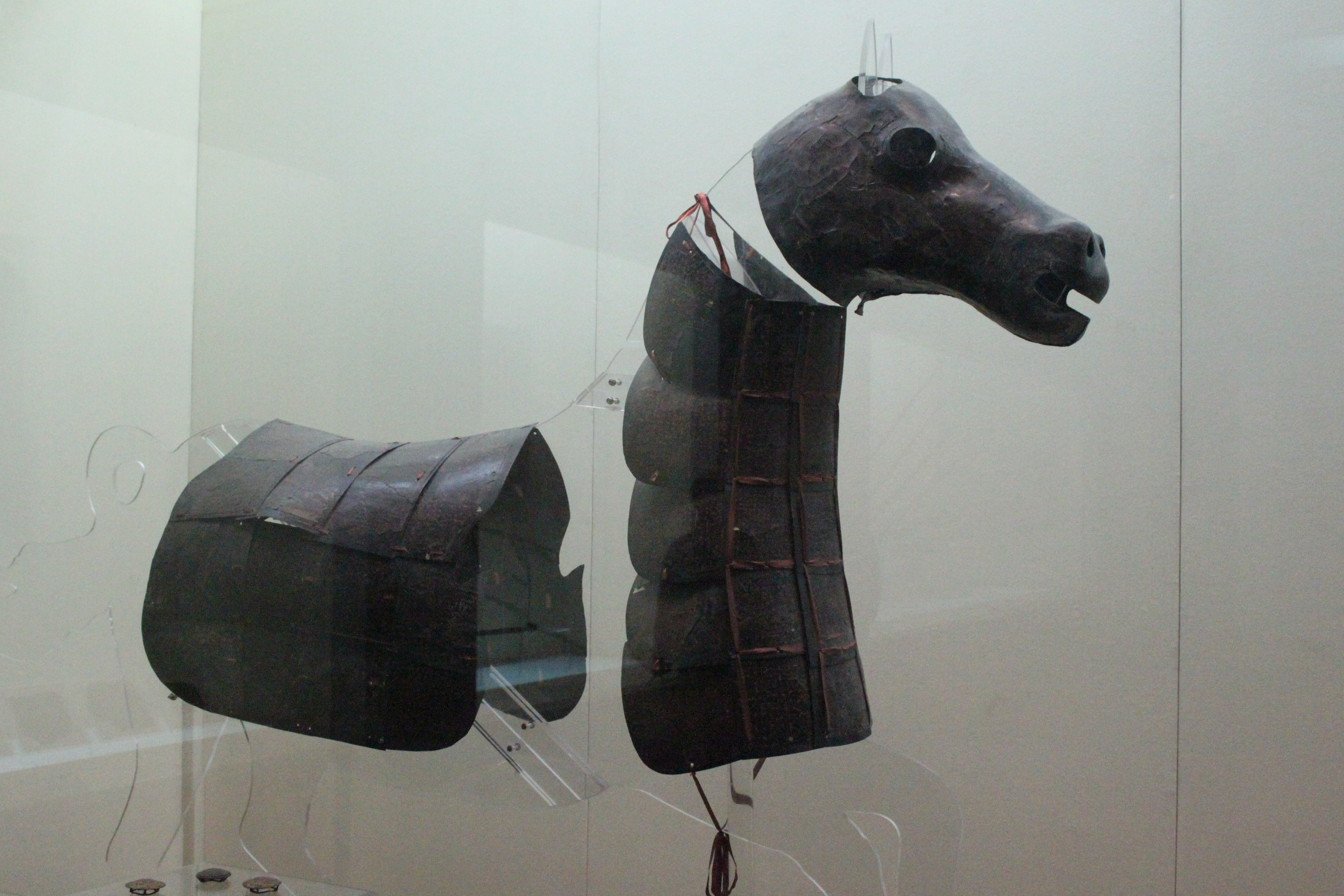
Leather horse armour from the Tomb of Marquis Yi of Zeng, 5th century BCE

In 771 BCE, a Quanrong invasion in coalition with the states of Zeng and Shen—the latter polity being the fief of the grandfather of the disinherited crown prince Yijiu—destroyed the Western Zhou capital at Haojing, killing King You and establishing Yijiu as king at the eastern capital Luoyi. The event ushered in the Eastern Zhou dynasty, which is divided into the Spring and Autumn and the Warring States periods. During the Spring and Autumn period, China's fengjian system became largely irrelevant. The Zhou court, having lost its homeland in the Guanzhong region, held nominal power, but had real control over only a small royal demesne centered on Luoyi. During the early part of the Zhou dynasty period, royal relatives and generals had been given control over fiefdoms in an effort to maintain Zhou authority over vast territory. As the power of the Zhou kings waned, these fiefdoms became increasingly independent states.

The most important states (known later as the twelve vassals) came together in regular conferences where they decided important matters, such as military expeditions against foreign groups or against offending nobles. During these conferences one vassal ruler was sometimes declared hegemon.

As the era continued, larger and more powerful states annexed or claimed suzerainty over smaller ones. By the 6th century BCE, most small states had disappeared and just a few large and powerful principalities dominated China. Some southern states, such as Chu and Wu, claimed independence from the Zhou, who undertook wars against some of them (Wu and Yue).

Amid the interstate power struggles, internal conflict was also rife: six elite landholding families waged war on each other inside Jin, political enemies set about eliminating the Chen family in Qi, and the legitimacy of the rulers was often challenged in civil wars by various royal family members in Qin and Chu. Once all these powerful rulers had firmly established themselves within their respective dominions, the bloodshed focused more fully on interstate conflict in the Warring States period, which began in 403 BCE when the three remaining elite families in Jin—Zhao, Wei and Han—partitioned the state.

== Early Spring and Autumn (771–685 BCE) ==
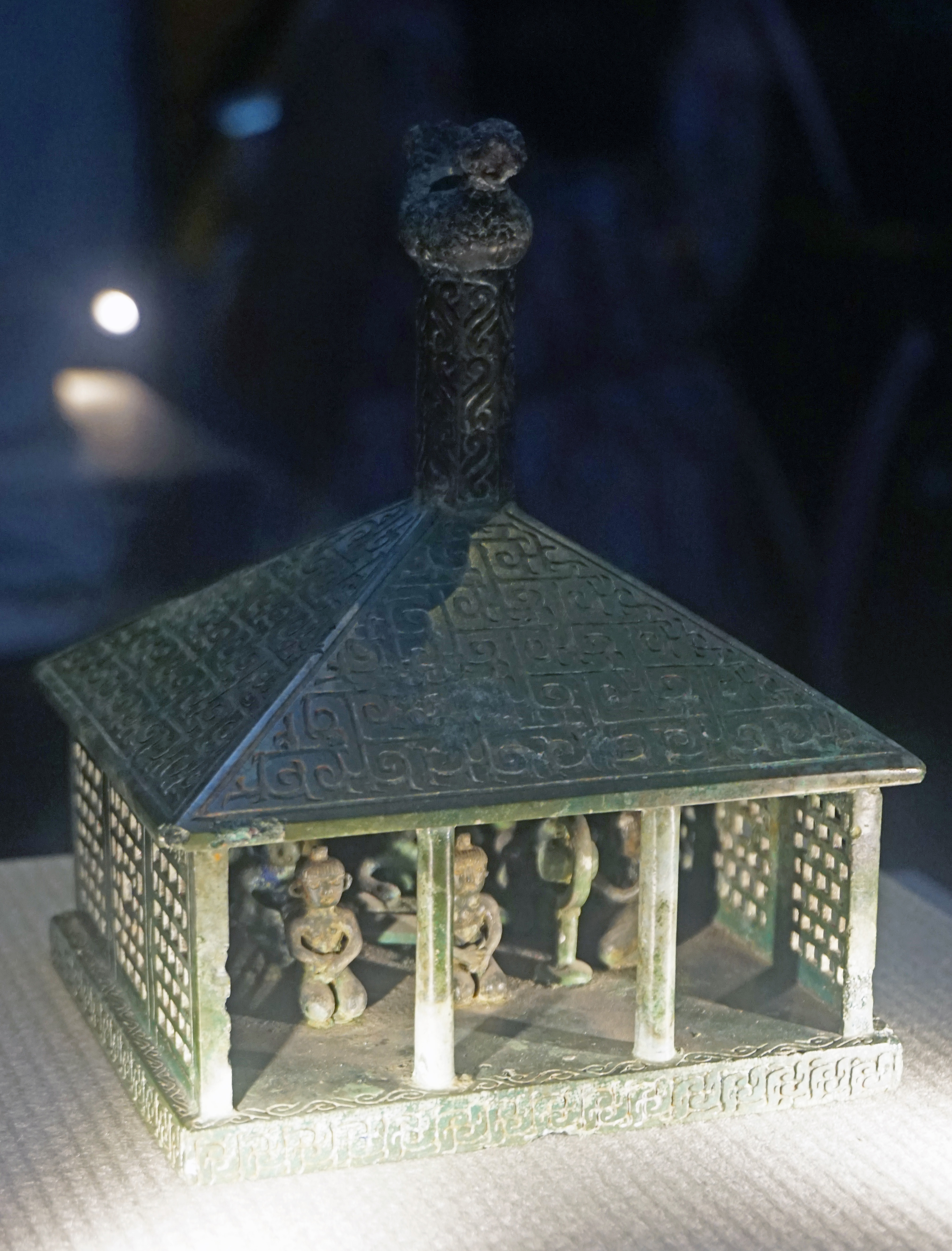
Yue style bronze building and entertainers (Spring and Autumn period)

=== Court moves east (771) ===
After the Zhou capital was sacked by the Marquess of Shen and the Quanrong barbarians, the Zhou moved the capital east from the now desolated Zongzhou in Haojing near modern Xi'an to Wangcheng in the Yellow River Valley. (Note: The events immediately following the fall of Haojing are subject to debate due to the recent discovery of the Xinian Manuscript. See the page on the Eastern Zhou for details.) The Zhou royalty was then closer to its main supporters, particularly Jin, and Zheng; the Zhou royal family had much weaker authority and relied on lords from these vassal states for protection, especially during their flight to the eastern capital. In Chengzhou, Prince Yijiu was crowned by his supporters as King Ping. However, with the Zhou domain greatly reduced to Chengzhou and nearby areas, the court could no longer support the six army groups it had in the past; Zhou kings had to request help from powerful vassal states for protection from raids and for resolution of internal power struggles. The Zhou court would never regain its original authority; instead, it was relegated to being merely a figurehead of the regional states and ritual leader of the Ji clan ancestral temple. Though the king retained the Mandate of Heaven, the title held little actual power.

With the decline of Zhou power, the Yellow River drainage basin was divided into hundreds of small, autonomous states, most of them consisting of a single city, though a handful of multi-city states, particularly those on the periphery, had power and opportunity to expand outward. A total of 148 states are mentioned in the chronicles for this period, (Note: The 148 states mentioned in the Spring and Autumn Annals are not considered to comprise an exhaustive list.) 128 of which were absorbed by the four largest states by the end of the period.

Shortly after the royal court's move to Chengzhou, a hierarchical alliance system arose where the Zhou king would give the title of hegemon (霸) to the leader of the state with the most powerful military; the hegemon was obligated to protect both the weaker Zhou states and the Zhou royalty from the intruding non-Zhou peoples: the Northern Di, the Southern Man, the Eastern Yi and the Western Rong. This political framework retained the fēngjiàn power structure, though interstate and intrastate conflict often led to declining regard for clan customs, respect for the Ji family, and solidarity with other Zhou peoples. The king's prestige legitimized the military leaders of the states, and helped mobilize collective defense of Zhou territory against "barbarians".

Over the next two centuries, the four most powerful states—Qin, Jin, Qi and Chu—struggled for power. These multi-city states often used the pretext of aid and protection to intervene and gain suzerainty over the smaller states. During this rapid expansion, interstate relations alternated between low-level warfare and complex diplomacy.

=== Zheng falls out with the court (722–685) ===
Duke Yin of Lu ascended the throne in 722. From this year on, the state of Lu kept an official chronicle, the Spring and Autumn Annals, which along with its commentaries is the standard source for the Spring and Autumn period. Corresponding chronicles are known to have existed in other states as well, but all but the Lu chronicle have been lost.

In 717, Duke Zhuang of Zheng went to the capital for an audience with King Huan. During the encounter the duke felt he was not treated with the respect and etiquette which would have been appropriate, given that Zheng was now the chief protector of the capital. In 715, Zheng also became involved in a border dispute with Lu regarding the Fields of Xu. The fields had been put in the care of Lu by the king for the exclusive purpose of producing royal sacrifices for the sacred Mount Tai. For Zheng to regard the fields as just any other piece of land was an insult to the court.

By 707, relations had soured enough that the king launched a punitive expedition against Zheng. The duke counterattacked and raided Zhou territory, defeating the royal forces in the Battle of Xuge and injuring the king himself. Zheng was the first vassal to openly defy the king, kicking off the centuries of warfare without respect for the old traditions which would characterize the period.

The display of Zheng's martial strength was effective until succession problems after Zhuang's death in 701 weakened the state.

In 692, there was a failed assassination attempt against King Zhuang, orchestrated by elements at court.

== The Five Hegemons (685–591 BCE) ==
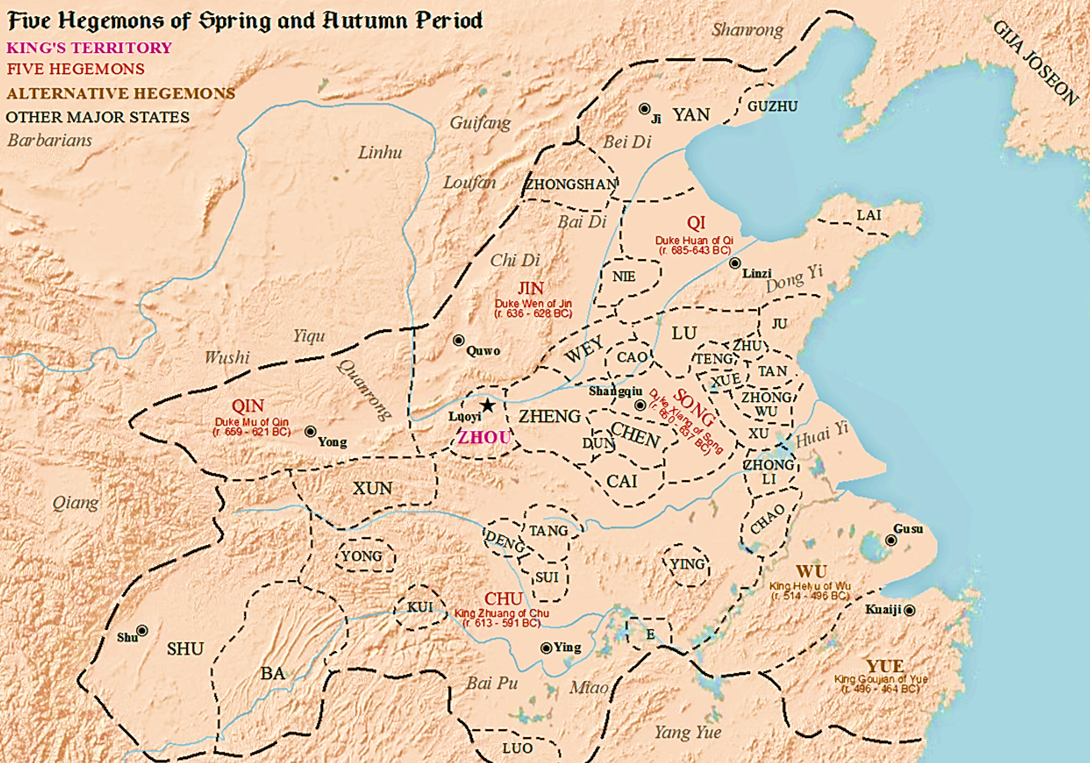
Map of the Five Hegemons during the Spring and Autumn period of the Zhou dynasty

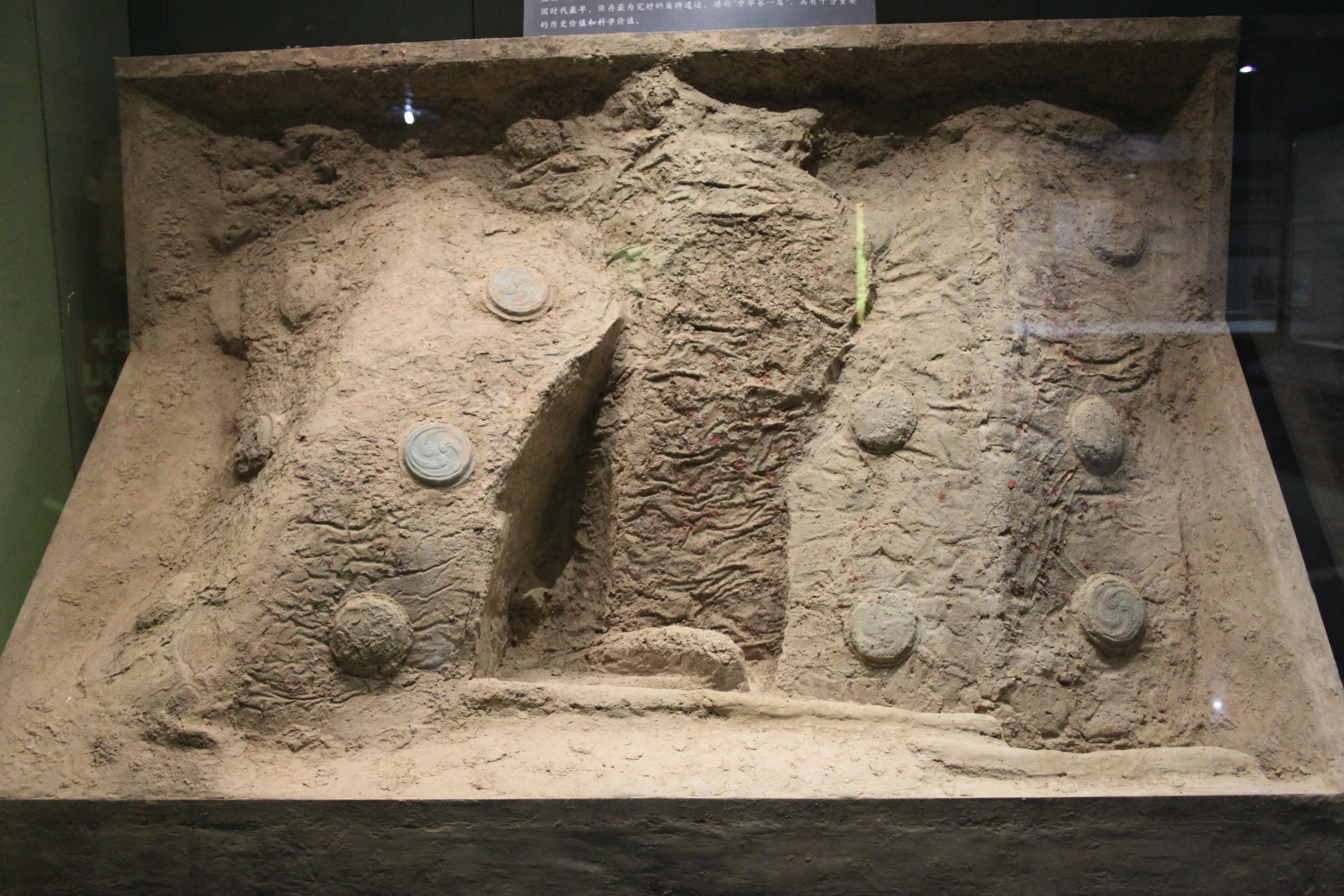
Shields from a Guo tomb

=== Hegemony of Qi (685–643) ===
The first hegemon was Duke Huan of Qi (r. 685–643). With the help of his prime minister, Guan Zhong, Duke Huan reformed Qi to centralize its power structure. The state consisted of 15 "townships" (縣) with the duke and two senior ministers each in charge of five; military functions were also united with civil ones. These and related reforms provided the state, already powerful from control of trade crossroads, with a greater ability to mobilize resources than the more loosely organized states.

By 667, Qi had clearly shown its economic and military predominance, and Duke Huan assembled the leaders of Lu, Song, Chen and Zheng, who elected him as their leader. Soon after, King Hui of Zhou conferred the title of bà (hegemon), giving Duke Huan royal authority in military ventures. An important basis for justifying Qi's dominance over the other states was presented in the slogan 'Revere the King, Expel the Barbarians' (尊王攘夷; zun wang rang yi). The role of subsequent hegemons would also be framed in this way: as the primary defender and supporter of nominal Zhou authority and the existing order. Using this authority, during the first eleven years of his hegemony, Duke Huan intervened in a power struggle in Lu; protected Yan from encroaching Western Rong nomads; drove off Northern Di nomads after their invasions of Wey and Xing, providing the people with provisions and protective garrison units; and led an alliance of eight states to conquer Cai and thereby block the northward expansion of Chu.

At his death in 643, five of Duke Huan's sons contended for the throne, badly weakening the state so that it was no longer regarded as the hegemon. For nearly ten years, no ruler held the title.

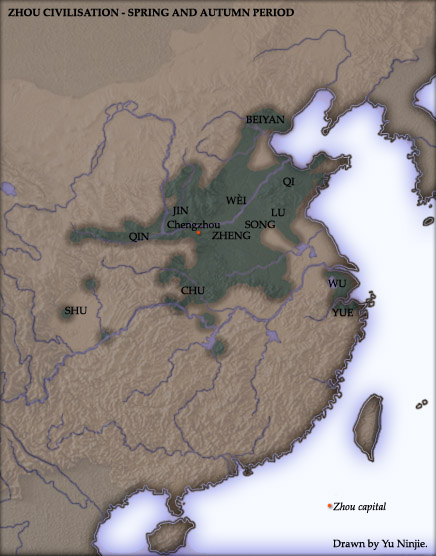
Urbanization during the Spring and Autumn period.

=== Hegemony of Song (643–637) ===
Duke Xiang of Song attempted to claim the hegemony in the wake of Qi's decline, perhaps driven by a desire to restore the Shang dynasty from which Song had descended. He hosted peace conferences in the same style as Qi had done, and conducted aggressive military campaigns against his rivals. Duke Xiang's ambitions met their end when, against the advice of his staff, he attacked the much larger state of Chu. The Song forces were defeated at the battle of Hong (泓) in 638, and the duke himself died in the following year from an injury sustained in the battle. After Xiang's death his successors adopted a more modest foreign policy, better suited to the country's small size.

As Duke Xiang was never officially recognized as hegemon by the King of Zhou, not all sources list him as one of the Five Hegemons.

=== Hegemony of Jin (636–628) ===
When Duke Wen of Jin came to power in 636 after extensive peregrinations in exile, he capitalized on the reforms of his father, Duke Xian (r. 676–651), who had centralized the state, killed off relatives who might threaten his authority, conquered sixteen smaller states, and even absorbed some Rong and Di peoples to make Jin much more powerful than it had been previously. When he assisted King Xiang in a succession struggle in 635, the king awarded Jin with strategically valuable territory near Chengzhou.

Duke Wen then used his growing power to coordinate a military response with Qi, Qin and Song against Chu, which had begun encroaching northward after the death of Duke Huán of Qi. With a decisive Chu loss at the Battle of Chengpu in 632, Duke Wen's loyalty to the Zhou king was rewarded at an interstate conference when King Xīang awarded him the title of bà.

After the death of Duke Wen in 628, a growing tension manifested in interstate violence that turned smaller states, particularly those at the border between Jin and Chu, into sites of constant warfare; Qi and Qin also engaged in numerous interstate skirmishes with Jin or its allies to boost their own power.

=== Hegemony of Qin (628–621) ===
Duke Mu of Qin ascended the throne in 659 and forged an alliance with Jin by marrying his daughter to Duke Wen. In 624, he established hegemony over the western Rong barbarians and became the most powerful lord of the time. However he did not chair any alliance with other states nor was he officially recognized as hegemon by the king. Therefore, not all sources accept him as one of the Five Hegemons.

=== Hegemony of Chu (613–591) ===
King Zhuang of Chu expanded the borders of Chu well north of the Yangtze River, threatening the Central States in modern Henan. At one point the Chu forces advanced to just outside the royal capital of Chengzhou, upon which King Zhuang sent a messenger to inquire into the heft and bulk of the Nine Cauldrons – the symbols of royal ritual authority – implying he might soon arrange to have them moved to his own capital. In the end the Zhou capital was spared, and Chu shifted focus to harassing the nearby state of Zheng. The once-hegemon state of Jin intervened to rescue Zheng from the Chu invaders but were resolutely defeated, which marks the ascension of Chu as the dominant state of the time.

Despite his de facto hegemony, King Zhuang's self-proclaimed title of "king" was never recognized by the Zhou states. In the Spring and Autumn Annals he is defiantly referred to as Zi (子, "viscount"), even at a time when he dominated most of south China. Later historians however always include him as one of the Five Hegemons.

== Late Spring and Autumn (591–453 BCE) ==
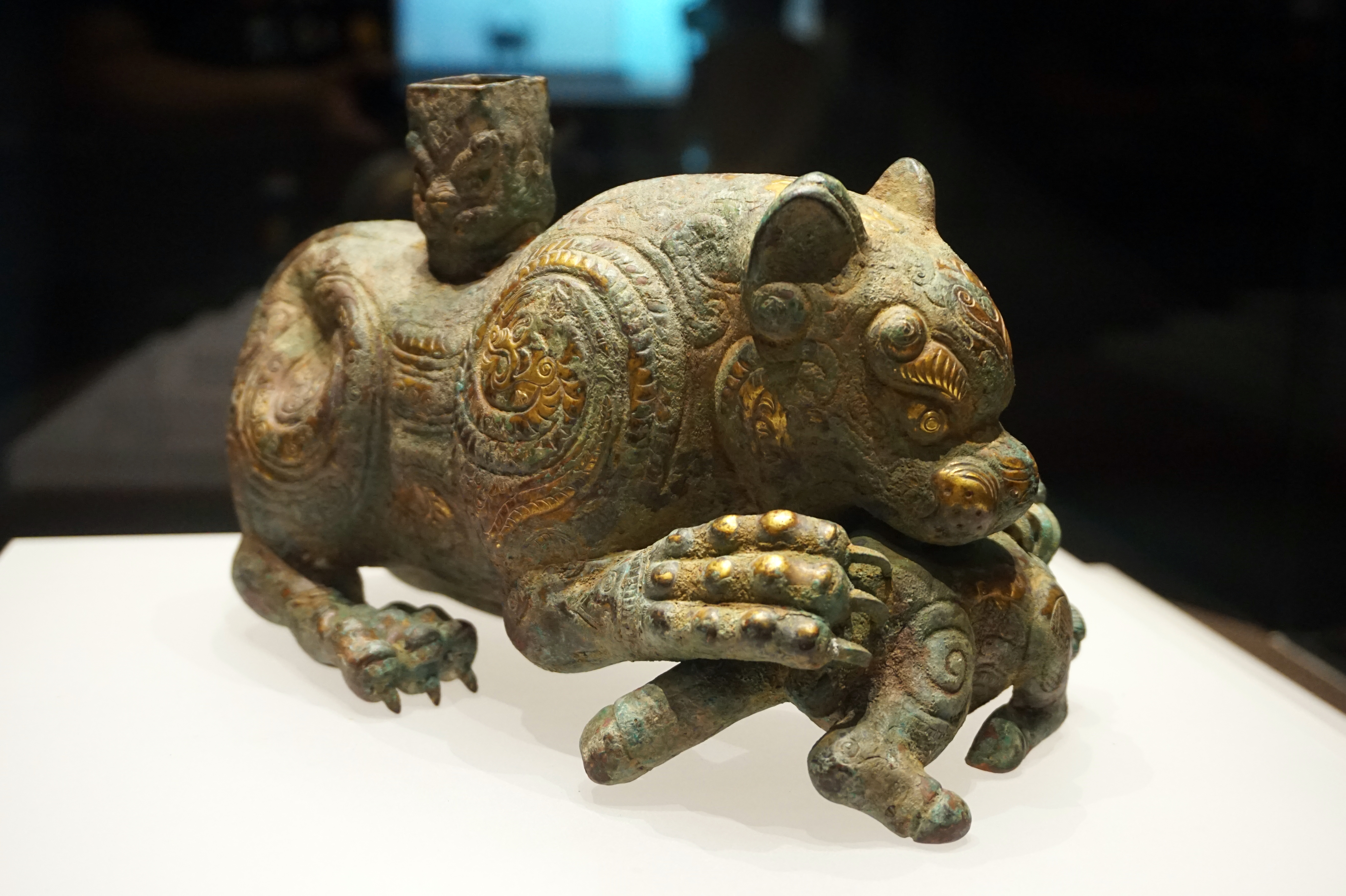
Bronze tiger eating an animal, gold inlay, Spring and Autumn period

=== The Six Ministers (588) ===
In addition to interstate conflict, internal conflicts between state leaders and local aristocrats also occurred. Eventually the dukes of Lu, Jin, Zheng, Wey and Qi would all become figureheads to powerful aristocratic families.

In the case of Jin, the shift happened in 588 when the army was split into six independent divisions, each dominated by a separate noble family: Zhi (智), Zhao (趙), Han (韓), Wei (魏), Fan (范) and Zhonghang (中行). The heads of the six families were conferred the titles of viscounts and made ministers, each heading one of the six departments of Zhou dynasty government. From this point on, historians refer to "The Six Ministers" as the true power brokers of Jin.

The same happened to Lu in 562, when the Three Huan divided the army into three parts and established their own separate spheres of influence. The heads of the three families were always among the department heads of Lu.

=== Rise of Wu (584) ===
Wu was a state in modern Jiangsu outside the Zhou cultural sphere, considered "barbarian", where the inhabitants sported short hair and tattoos and spoke an unintelligible language. Although its ruling house claimed to be a senior lineage in the Ji ancestral temple, (Note: Descent of the Wu ruling house from the Zhou ancestral line is not universally dismissed in modern scholarship.) Wu did not participate in the politics and wars of China until the last third of the Spring and Autumn period.

Their first documented interaction with the Spring and Autumn states was in 584, when a Wu force attacked the small border state of Tan (郯) causing some alarm in the various Chinese courts. Jin was quick to dispatch an ambassador to the court of the Wu king, Shoumeng. Jin promised to supply Wu with modern military technology and training in exchange for an alliance against Chu, a neighbour of Wu and Jin's nemesis in the struggle for hegemony. King Shoumeng accepted the offer, and Wu would continue to harass Chu for years to come.

=== Attempts at peace (579) ===
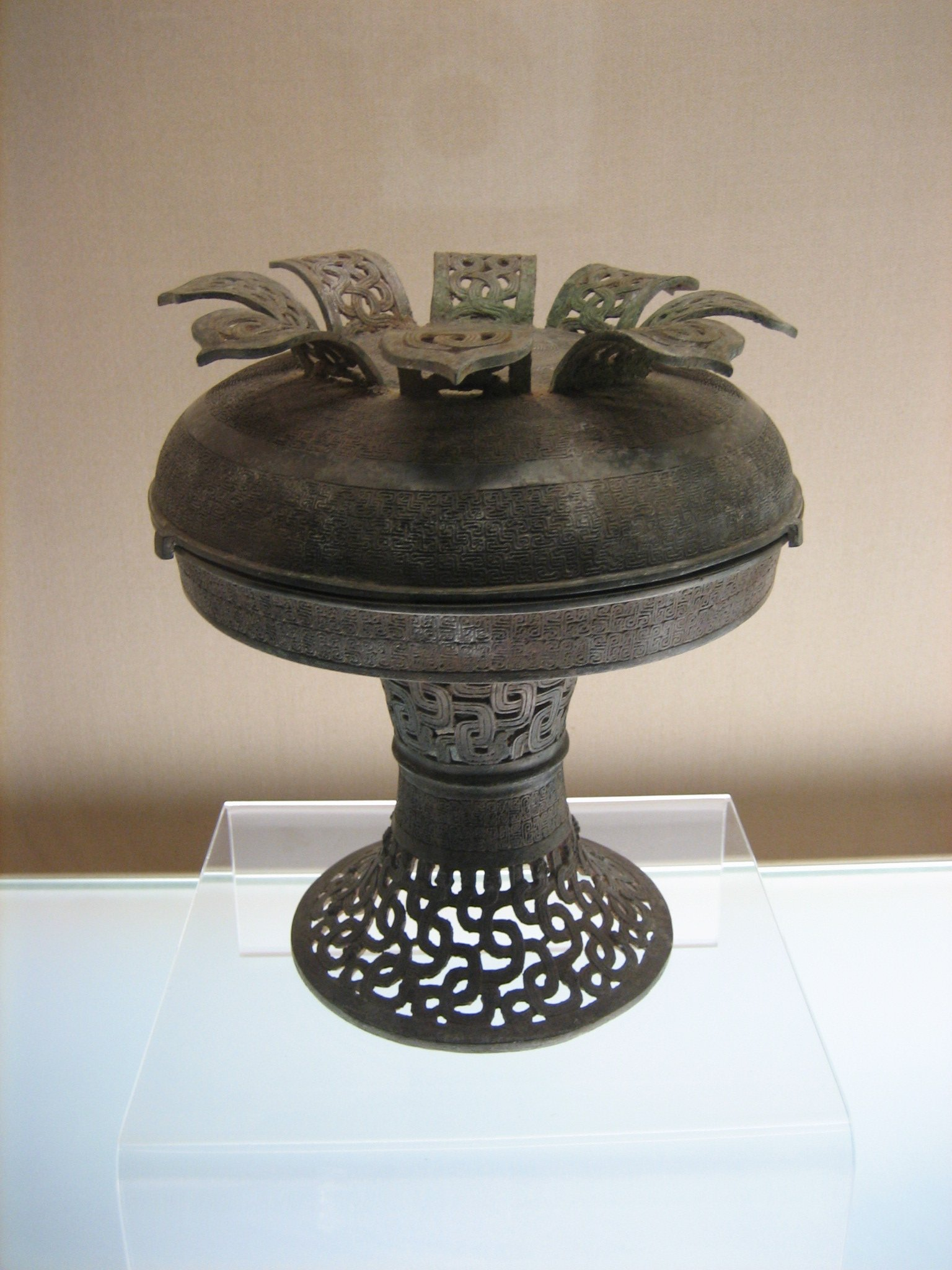
Dòu vessel with interlaced dragon design, Spring and Autumn period.

After a period of increasingly exhausting warfare, Qi, Qin, Jin and Chu met at a disarmament conference in 579 and agreed to declare a truce to limit their military strength. This peace did not last very long and it soon became apparent that the bà role had become outdated; the four major states had each acquired their own spheres of control and the notion of protecting Zhou territory had become less cogent as the control over (and the resulting cultural assimilation of) non-Zhou peoples, as well as Chu's control of some Zhou areas, further blurred an already vague distinction between Zhou and non-Zhou.

In addition, new aristocratic houses were founded with loyalties to powerful states, rather than directly to the Zhou kings, though this process slowed down by the end of the seventh century, possibly because territory available for expansion had been largely exhausted. The Zhou kings had also lost much of their prestige so that, when Duke Dao of Jin (r. 572–558) was recognized as bà, it carried much less meaning than it had before.

=== Hegemony of Wu (506–496) ===
In 506, King Helü ascended the throne of Wu. With the help of Wu Zixu and Sun Tzu, the author of The Art of War, he launched major offensives against the state of Chu. They prevailed in five battles, one of which was the Battle of Boju, and conquered the capital Ying. However, Chu managed to ask the state of Qin for help, and after being defeated by Qin, the vanguard general of Wu troops, Fugai, a younger brother of Helü, led a rebellion. After beating Fugai, Helü was forced to leave Chu. Fugai later retired to Chu and settled there. King Helü died during an invasion of Yue in 496. Some sources such as the Confucian text Bai Hu Tong list him as one of the Five Hegemons.

He was succeeded by his son King Fuchai of Wu, who nearly destroyed the Yue state, imprisoning King Goujian of Yue. Subsequently, Fuchai defeated Qi and extended Wu influence into central China.

In 499, the philosopher Confucius was made acting prime minister of Lu. He is traditionally (if improbably) considered the author or editor of the Spring and Autumn annals, from which much of the information for this period is drawn. After only two years he was forced to resign and spent many years wandering between different states before returning to Lu. After returning to Lu he did not resume a political career, preferring to teach. Tradition holds that it was in this time he edited or wrote the Five Classics, including the Spring and Autumn Annals.

=== Hegemony of Yue (496–465) ===
In 482, King Fuchai of Wu held an interstate conference to solidify his power base, but Yue captured the Wu capital. Fuchai rushed back but was besieged and died when the city fell in 473. Yue then concentrated on weaker neighbouring states, rather than the great powers to the north. With help from Wu's enemy Chu, Yue was able to be victorious after several decades of conflict. King Goujian destroyed and annexed Wu in 473, after which he was recognized as hegemon.

The Zuozhuan, Guoyu and Shiji provide almost no information about Goujian's subsequent reign or policies. What little is said is told from the perspective of other states, such as Duke Ai of Lu trying to enlist Yue's help in a coup against the Three Huan. Sima Qian notes that Goujian reigned on until his death, and that afterwards his descendants—for whom no biographical information is given—continued to rule for six generations before the state was finally absorbed into Chu during the Warring States period.

=== Partition of Jin ===
After the great age of Jin power, the Jin rulers began to lose authority over their ministerial lineages. A full-scale civil war between 497 and 453 ended with the elimination of most noble lines; the remaining aristocratic families divided Jin into three successor states: Han, Wei and Zhao. This is the last event recorded in the Zuozhuan.

With the absorption of most of the smaller states in the era, this partitioning left seven major states in the Zhou world: the three fragments of Jin, the three remaining great powers of Qin, Chu and Qi, and the weaker state of Yan (燕) near modern Beijing. The partition of Jin, along with the usurpation of Qi by Tian, marks the beginning of the Warring States period.

== Interstate relations ==
Ancient sources such as the Zuo Zhuan and the eponymous Chunqiu record the various diplomatic activities, such as court visits paid by one ruler to another (朝; cháo), meetings of officials or nobles of different states (會; 会; huì), missions of friendly inquiries sent by the ruler of one state to another (聘; pìn), emissaries sent from one state to another (使; shǐ), and hunting parties attended by representatives of different states (狩; shou).

Because of Chu's non-Zhou origin, the state was considered semi-barbarian and its rulers—beginning with King Wu in 704 BCE—proclaimed themselves kings in their own right. Chu intrusion into Zhou territory was checked several times by the other states, particularly in the major battles of Chengpu (632 BCE), Bi (595 BCE) and Yanling (575 BCE), which restored the states of Chen and Cai.

== Literature ==
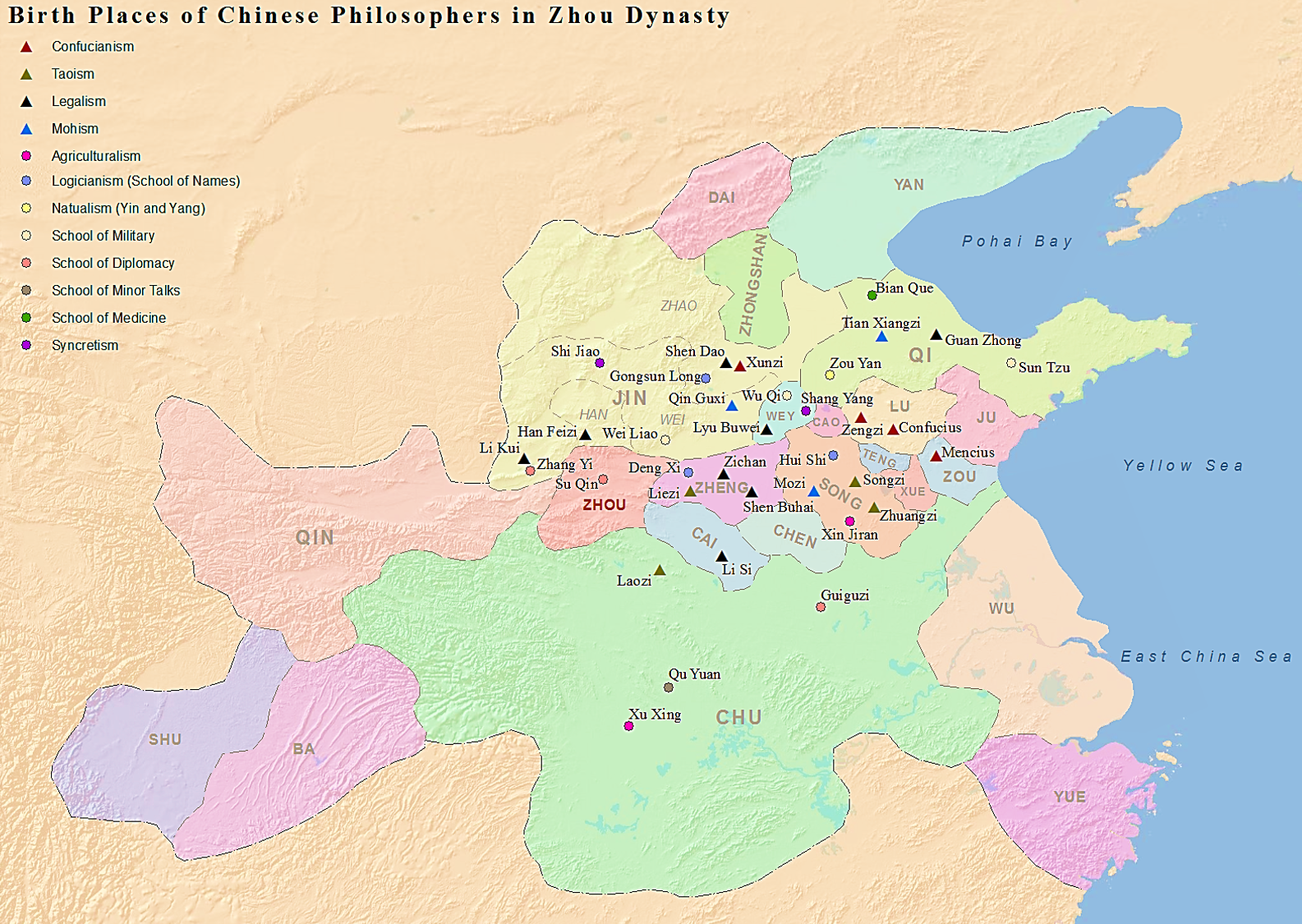
Birthplaces of notable Chinese philosophers of the Hundred Schools of Thoughts in the Zhou dynasty

Some version of the Five Classics existed in the Spring and Autumn period, as characters in the Zuozhuan and Analects frequently quote the Book of Poetry and Book of Documents. On the other hand, the Zuozhuan depicts some characters actually composing poems that would later be included in the received text of the Book of Poetry. In the Analects there are frequent references to "The Rites", but as Classical Chinese does not employ punctuation or any markup to distinguish book titles from regular nouns it is not possible to know if what is meant is the Etiquette and Ceremonial (known then as the Book of Rites) or just the concept of ritual in general. On the other hand, the existence of the Book of Changes is well-attested in the Zuozhuan, as multiple characters use it for divination and accurately quote the received text.

Sima Qian claims that it was Confucius who, towards the close of the Spring and Autumn period, edited the received versions of the Book of Poetry, Book of Documents and Book of Rites; wrote the "Ten Wings" commentary on the Book of Changes; and wrote the entirety of the Spring and Autumn Annals. This was long the predominant opinion in China, but modern scholarship considers it unlikely that all five classics could be the product of one man. The transmitted versions of these works all derive from the versions edited by Liu Xin in the century following Sima Qian.

While many philosophers such as Lao Tzu and Sun Tzu were active in the Spring and Autumn period, their ideas were probably not put into writing until the following Warring States period.

== Aristocracy ==
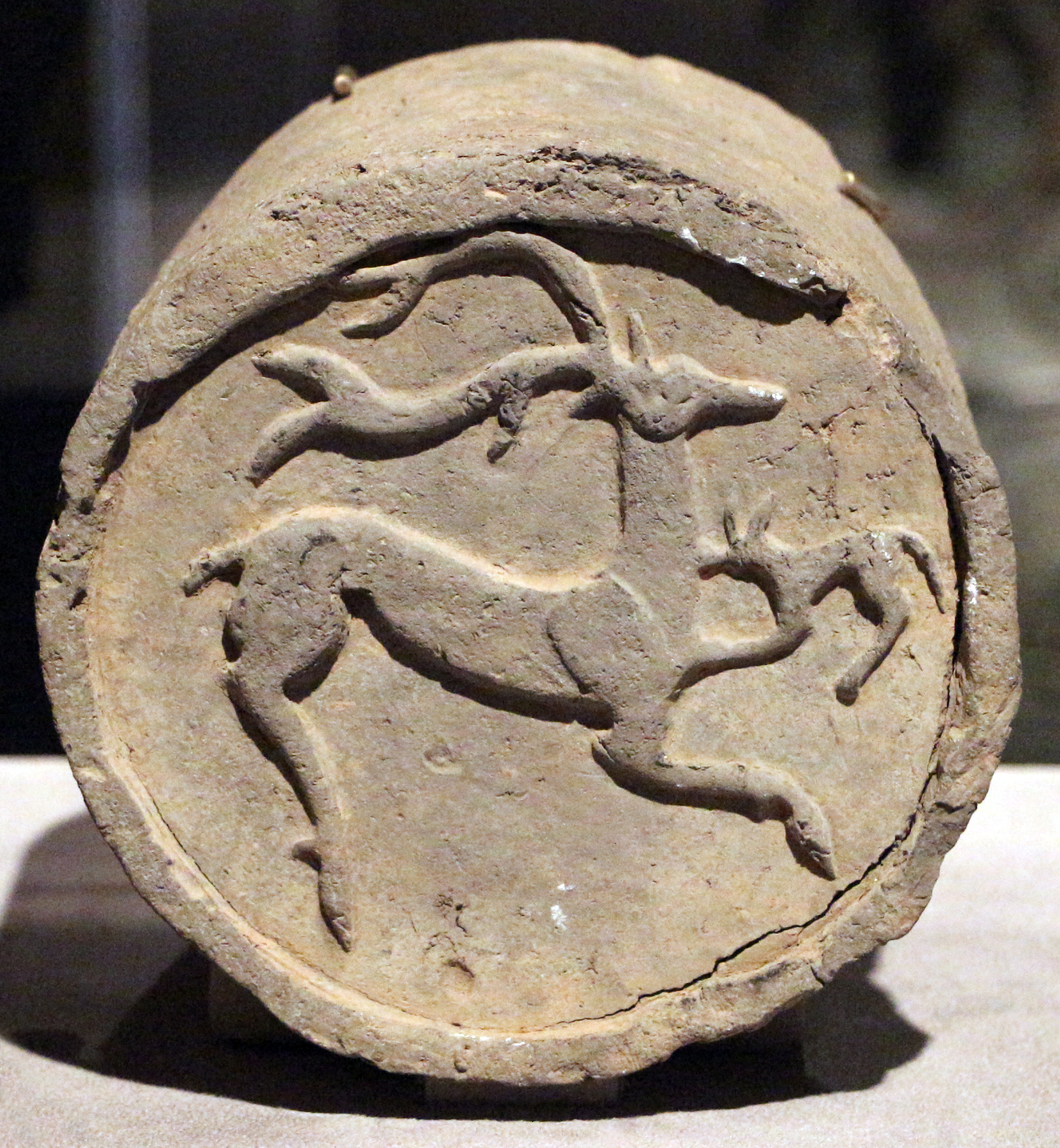
Spring and Autumn period, Qin state, acroterion with deer and roe deer, c. 770–475 BCE, from Doufu, Baoji (Provincial institute of archeology of Shaanxi)

While the aristocracy of the Western Zhou frequently interacted via the medium of the royal court, the collapse of central power at the end of the first half of the dynasty left in its wake hundreds of autonomous polities varying drastically in size and resources, nominally connected by bonds of cultural and ritual affiliation increasingly attenuated by the passage of time. Whole lineage groups moved around under socioeconomic stress, border groups not associated with the Zhou culture gained in power and sophistication, and the geopolitical situation demanded increased contact and communication.

Under this new regime, an emergent systematization of noble ranks took root. Where the Western Zhou had concerned itself with politics, the ancestral temples and legitimacy, in the Eastern Zhou politics came to the fore. Titles which had previously reflected lineage seniority took on purely political meanings. At the top of the bunch were Gong (公) and Hou (侯), favoured lineages of old with generally larger territories and greater resources and prestige at their disposal. The majority of rulers were of the middling but tiered grades Bo (伯) and Zi (子). The rulers of two polities maintained the title Nan (男). A 2012 survey found no difference in grade between Gong and Hou, or between Zi and Nan. Meanwhile, a new class of lower-tier aristocrats formed: the Shi (士), gentlemen too distantly related to the great houses to be born into a life of wielding power, but still part of the elite culture, aiming at upward social mobility, typically through the vector of officialdom.

One individual well attested in the process of fixing the ranks of rulers into a coherent scheme was Zichan of Zheng, who both submitted a memorial to the king of Chu informing him of the proposed new system in 538 BCE, and argued at a 529 BCE interstate conference that tributes should be graded based on rank, given the disparity in available resources.

Alongside this development, there was precedent of Zhou kings "upgrading" noble ranks as a reward for service to the throne, giving the recipients a bit more diplomatic prestige without costing the royal house any land. During the decline of the royal house, although real power was wrested from their grasp, their divine legitimacy was not brought into question, and even with the king reduced to something of a figurehead, his prestige remained supreme as Heaven's eldest son.

Archaeologically excavated primary sources and received literature agree to a high degree of systematization and stability in noble titles during the Eastern Zhou, indicating an actual historical process. A 2007 survey of bronze inscriptions from 31 states found only eight polities whose rulers used varying titles of nobility to describe themselves.

== Important figures ==
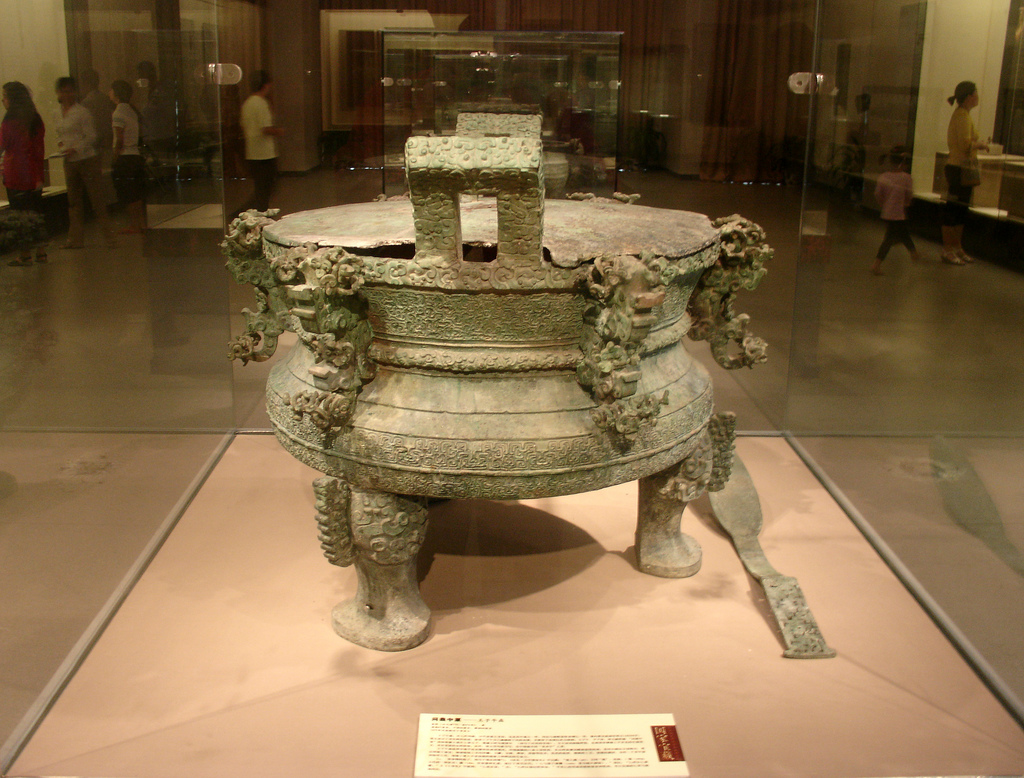
A large bronze tripod vessel from the Spring and Autumn period, now located at the Henan Museum

The Five Hegemons (春秋五霸): With the royal house of Zhou lacking the military strength to defend itself, and with the various states experiencing tension and conflict, certain very powerful lords took the position of hegemon, ostensibly to uphold the house of Zhou and maintain the peace to the degree possible. They paid tribute to the royal court, and were owed tribute by the other rulers. Traditional history lists five hegemons during the Spring and Autumn period:

- Duke Huan of Qi (r. 685–643 BCE)
- Duke Xiang of Song (r. 650–637 BCE)
- Duke Wen of Jin (r. 636–628 BCE)
- Duke Mu of Qin (r. 659–621 BCE)
- King Zhuang of Chu (r. 613–591 BCE)

Alternatively:

- Duke Huan of Qi (r. 685–643 BCE)
- Duke Wen of Jin (r. 636–628 BCE)
- King Zhuang of Chu (r. 613–591 BCE)
- King Fuchai of Wu (r. 495–473 BCE)
- King Goujian of Yue (r. 496–465 BCE)

Bureaucrats or Officers

- Guan Zhong, advisor of Duke Huan of Qi
- Baili Xi, prime minister of Qin
- Wu Zixu, Duke of Shen, important adviser of King Helü, early culture hero, sometimes considered "the single best-recorded individual in the history of the Spring and Autumn period"
- Bo Pi, bureaucrat under King Helü who played an important diplomatic role in Wu–Yue relations
- Wen Zhong, advisor of King Goujian of Yue in his war against Wu
- Fan Li, another advisor to Goujian, also renowned for his incredible business acumen
- Zichan, leader of self-strengthening movements in Zheng
- Yan Ying or Yanzi, central figure of the Yanzi Chunqiu

Influential scholars

- Confucius or Kongzi, leading figure in Confucianism
- Lao-tse or Laozi, teacher of Taoism
- Mo Di, Mozi, or Mo-tse, founder of Mohism
- Sun Tzu or Sunzi, author of The Art of War

Other people

- Lu Ban, master builder
- Yao Li, sent by King Helü to kill Qing Ji
- Zhuan Zhu, sent by Helü to kill his cousin King Liao
- Bo Ya, outstanding musician
- Ou Yezi, swordsmaker

== List of states ==
The Liji claims that the Eastern Zhou was divided into 1,773 states, of which 148 are known by name as mentioned in the Zuo Zhuan.

Name	Chinese	Capital	Location	Established	Dissolved
Ba	巴	Yicheng (夷城)	Changyang County, Hubei	King Wu's reign	316 BCE: to Qin
Ba	巴	Pingdu (平都)	Fengdu County, Chongqing	King Wu's reign	316 BCE: to Qin
Ba	巴	Zhi (枳)	Fuling District, Chongqing	King Wu's reign	316 BCE: to Qin
Ba	巴	Jiangzhou (江州)	Chongqing	King Wu's reign	316 BCE: to Qin
Ba	巴	Dianjiang (垫江)	Hechuan District, Chongqing	King Wu's reign	316 BCE: to Qin
Ba	巴	Langzhong (閬中)	Langzhong, Sichuan	King Wu's reign	316 BCE: to Qin
Bi	畢	Bi	unknown	King Wu's reign	unknown
Biyang, Fuyang	偪陽 or 傅陽	Biyang	Yicheng District, Zaozhuang, Shandong	unknown	563 BCE: to Song
Cai	蔡	Shangcai (上蔡)	Shangcai County, Henan	King Wu's reign	447 BCE: to Chu
Cai	蔡	Xincai (新蔡)	Xincai County, Henan	King Wu's reign	447 BCE: to Chu
Cai	蔡	Xiacai (下蔡)	Fengtai County, Anhui	King Wu's reign	447 BCE: to Chu
Cao	曹	Taoqiu (陶丘)	Dingtao District, Heze, Shandong	King Wu's reign	487 BCE: to Song
Chao	巢	Chao	Chaohu, Anhui	unknown	c. 518 BCE: to Wu
Chen	陳	Wanqiu (宛丘)	Huaiyang District, Zhoukou, Henan	King Wu's reign	479 BCE: to Chu
Cheng	郕 or 成	Cheng	Ningyang County, Shandong	King Wu's reign	408 BCE: to Qi
Chu	楚 or 荊	Danyang (丹陽)	Xichuan County, Henan	King Cheng's reign	223 BCE: to Qin
Chu	楚 or 荊	Ying (郢)	Jingzhou, Hubei	King Cheng's reign	223 BCE: to Qin
Chu	楚 or 荊	Chen (陳)	Huaiyang District, Zhoukou, Henan	King Cheng's reign	223 BCE: to Qin
Chu	楚 or 荊	Shouchun (壽春)	Shou County, Anhui	King Cheng's reign	223 BCE: to Qin
Chunyu, Zhou	淳于 or 州	Zhou (州)	Anqiu, Shandong	King Wu's reign	706 BCE: to Qi (杞)
Dai	戴	Dai	Minquan County, Henan	unknown	713 BCE: to Zheng
Dao	道	Dao	unknown	unknown	unknown
Deng	鄧	Deng	Dengzhou, Henan	before Western Zhou	678 BCE: to Chu
E	鄂	E	Nanyang, Henan	before Western Zhou	863 BCE: to Chu
Fan	番 or 潘 or 鄱	Fan	Gushi County, Henan	unknown	504 BCE: to Wu
Fan	凡	Fan	Huixian, Henan	unknown	unknown
Fan	樊	Fan	Chang'an District, Xi'an, Shaanxi	King Xuan's reign	635 BCE: to Jin
Fan	樊	Yang (陽)	Jiyuan, Henan	King Xuan's reign	635 BCE: to Jin
Gan	甘	Gan	Yuanyang County, Henan	King Xiang's reign	unknown
Gao	郜	Gao	Chengwu County, Shandong	King Wu's reign	8th century BCE: to Song
Ge	葛	Ge	Ningling County, Henan	before Western Zhou	unknown
Gong	鞏	Gong	Xiaoyi, Henan	unknown	516 BCE: to Jin
Gong	共	Gong	Huixian, Henan	unknown	mid-7th century BCE: to Wey
Guang	光	Guang	Guangshan County, Henan	before Western Zhou	650 BCE: to Chu
Guo	郭	Guo	Liaocheng, Shandong	unknown	670 BCE: to Qi
Eastern Guo	東虢	Zhi (制)	Xingyang, Henan	King Wu's reign	767 BCE: to Zheng
Western Guo	西虢	Yongdi (雍地)	Baoji, Shaanxi	King Wu's reign	687 BCE: to Jin
Western Guo	西虢	Shangyang (上陽)	Shan County, Henan	King Wu's reign	687 BCE: to Jin
Hu	胡	Hu	Wuyang County, Henan	unknown	763 BCE: to Zheng
Hua	滑	Hua	Minquan County, Henan	unknown	627 BCE: to Qin
Hua	滑	Fei (費)	Yanshi, Henan	unknown	627 BCE: to Qin
Huang	黃	Longgu Xiang	Huangchuan County, Henan	unknown	648 BCE: to Chu
Hui	鄶 or 會 or 檜	Hui	Xinzheng, Henan	unknown	769 BCE: to Zheng
Ji	紀	Ji	Shouguang, Shandong	unknown	690 BCE: to Qi
Ji	極	Ji	Shan County, Shandong	unknown	721 BCE: to Lu
Ji	祭	Ji	Changyuan, Henan	King Wu's reign	750 BCE: to Zheng
Ji	祭	Guan (管)	Zhengzhou, Henan	King Wu's reign	750 BCE: to Zheng
Jiang	江	Jiang (Chinese: 江)	Xi County, Henan	1101 BCE	623 BCE: to Chu
Jiang	蔣	Jiang	Gushi County, Henan	King Cheng's reign	617 BCE: to Chu
Jie	介	Jie	Jiaozhou, Shandong	unknown	unknown: to Qi
Jin	晉	Tang (唐), or Jin	Yicheng County, Shanxi	King Cheng's reign	376 BCE: to Han and Zhao
Jin	晉	Quwo (曲沃)	Wenxi County, Shanxi	King Cheng's reign	376 BCE: to Han and Zhao
Jin	晉	Jiang (絳), or Yi (翼)	Yicheng County, Shanxi	King Cheng's reign	376 BCE: to Han and Zhao
Jin	晉	Xintian (新田), or Xinjiang (新絳)	Houma, Shanxi	King Cheng's reign	376 BCE: to Han and Zhao
Ju	莒	Jiegen (介根)	Jiaozhou, Shandong	King Wu's reign	431 BCE: to Chu
Ju	莒	Ju	Ju County, Shandong	King Wu's reign	431 BCE: to Chu
Lai	萊	Changle (昌樂)	Changle County, Shandong	before Western Zhou	567 BCE: to Qi
Lan	濫	Lan	Tengzhou, Shandong	781 BCE	521 BCE: to Lu
Liang	梁	Liang	Hancheng, Shaanxi	unknown	641 BCE: to Qin
Liao, Miu	蓼 or 繆	Liao	Gushi County, Henan	unknown	622 BCE: to Chu
Liu	劉	Liu	Yanshi, Henan	592 BCE	c. 5th century BCE: to Zhou dynasty
Lu	魯	Lu	Lushan County, Henan	King Cheng's reign	256 BCE: to Chu
Lu	魯	Yancheng (奄城)	Qufu, Shandong	King Cheng's reign	256 BCE: to Chu
Lu	魯	Qufu (曲阜)	Qufu, Shandong	King Cheng's reign	256 BCE: to Chu
Lü	呂	Lü	Nanyang, Henan	unknown	688 BCE: to Chu
Mao	毛	Mao	Qishan County, Shaanxi	King Wu's reign	516 BCE: to Qin
Mao	茅	Mao	Jinxiang County, Shandong	King Cheng's reign	6th century BCE: to Zou
Ni, Xiaozhu	郳 or 小邾	Ni	Shanting District, Zaozhuang, Shandong	King Cheng's reign	335 BCE: to Chu
Qi	齊	Yingqiu (營丘), or Linzi (臨淄)	Linzi District, Zibo, Shandong	King Wu's reign	221 BCE: to Qin
Qi	杞	Qi	Qi County, Henan	before Western Zhou	445 BCE: to Chu
Qi	杞	Pingyang (平陽)	Xintai, Shandong	before Western Zhou	445 BCE: to Chu
Qi	杞	Yuanling (緣陵)	Changle County, Shandong	before Western Zhou	445 BCE: to Chu
Qi	杞	Chunyu (淳于)	Anqiu, Shandong	before Western Zhou	445 BCE: to Chu
Qin	秦	Qin	Qingshui County, Gansu	King Xiao's reign	206 BCE: to Western Chu
Qin	秦	Qian (汧)	Long County, Shaanxi	King Xiao's reign	206 BCE: to Western Chu
Qin	秦	Pingyang (平陽)	Mei County, Shaanxi	King Xiao's reign	206 BCE: to Western Chu
Qin	秦	Yong (雍)	Fengxiang County, Shaanxi	King Xiao's reign	206 BCE: to Western Chu
Qin	秦	Yueyang (櫟陽)	Yanliang District, Xi'an, Shaanxi	King Xiao's reign	206 BCE: to Western Chu
Qin	秦	Xianyang (咸阳)	Xianyang, Shaanxi	King Xiao's reign	206 BCE: to Western Chu
Quan	權	Quan	Jingmen, Hubei	unknown	704 BCE: to Chu
Ren	任	Ren	Weishan County, Shandong	unknown	Warring States period
Ruo	鄀	Shangruo (上鄀) or Shangmi (商密)	Xichuan County, Henan	unknown	unknown
Ruo	鄀	Xiaruo (下鄀)	Yicheng, Hubei	unknown	unknown
Shao	召 or 邵	Shao	Qishan County, Shaanxi	King Wu's reign	513 BCE: to Zhou dynasty
Shan, Tan	單 or 檀	Shan	Mengjin County, Henan	King Cheng's reign	unknown
Shen, Xie	申 or 謝	Shen	Nanyang, Henan	King Xuan's reign	688 – 680 BCE: to Chu
Shen	沈	Shen	Linquan County, Anhui	King Cheng's reign	506 BCE: to Cai
Shu	蜀	unknown	unknown	unknown	316 BCE: to Qin
Song	宋	Shangqiu (商丘)	Shangqiu, Henan	King Cheng's reign	286 BCE: to Qi
Su	宿	Su	Dongping County, Shandong	unknown	7th century BCE: to Song
Sui	遂	Sui	Ningyang County, Shandong	before Western Zhou	681 BCE: to Qi
Tan	郯	Tan	Tancheng County, Shandong	unknown	414 BCE: to Yue
Tan	譚	Tan	Zhangqiu, Shandong	c. 1046 BCE	684 BCE: to Qi
Teng	滕	Teng	Tengzhou, Shandong	King Wu's reign	297 BCE: to Song
Wangshu	王叔	Wangshu	Mengjin County, Henan	King Xiang of Zhou	563 BCE: to Zhou dynasty
Wei (Wey)	衛	Zhaoge (朝歌)	Qi County, Henan	King Cheng's reign	209 BCE: to Qin
Wei (Wey)	衛	Cao (曹)	Hua County, Henan	King Cheng's reign	209 BCE: to Qin
Wei (Wey)	衛	Chuqiu (楚丘)	Hua County, Henan	King Cheng's reign	209 BCE: to Qin
Wei (Wey)	衛	Diqiu (帝丘)	Puyang County, Henan	King Cheng's reign	209 BCE: to Qin
Wei (Wey)	衛	Yewang (野王)	Qinyang, Henan	King Cheng's reign	209 BCE: to Qin
Wen	溫	Wen	Wen County, Henan	King Wu's reign	650 BCE: to Beidi
Wu	吳	Wu, or Gusu (姑蘇)	Suzhou, Jiangsu	unknown	473 BCE: to Yue
Xi	息	Xi	Xi County, Henan	unknown	684 – 680 BCE: to Chu
Xian	弦	Xian	Huanggang, Hubei	unknown	655 BCE: to Chu
Xiang	向	Xiang	Ju County, Shandong	unknown	721 BCE: to Ju
Xing	邢	Xing	Xingtai, Hebei	King Cheng's reign	632 BCE: to Wey
Xing	邢	Yiyi (夷儀)	Liaocheng, Shandong	King Cheng's reign	632 BCE: to Wey
Xu	徐	Xu	Tancheng County, Shandong	before Western Zhou	512 BCE: to Wu
Xu	許 or 鄦	Xu	Xuchang, Henan	King Wu's reign	c. 5th century BCE: to Chu
Xu	許 or 鄦	Ye (葉)	Ye County, Henan	King Wu's reign	c. 5th century BCE: to Chu
Xu	許 or 鄦	Yi (夷) or Chengfu (城父)	Bozhou, Anhui	King Wu's reign	c. 5th century BCE: to Chu
Xu	許 or 鄦	Xi (析)	Xixia County, Henan	King Wu's reign	c. 5th century BCE: to Chu
Xu	許 or 鄦	Rongcheng (容城)	Lushan County, Henan	King Wu's reign	c. 5th century BCE: to Chu
Xue, Pi	薛 or 邳	Xue	Tengzhou, Shandong	before Western Zhou	418 BCE: to Qi
Xue, Pi	薛 or 邳	Xiapi (下邳)	Pizhou, Jiangsu	before Western Zhou	418 BCE: to Qi
Xue, Pi	薛 or 邳	Shangpi (上邳)	Pizhou, Jiangsu	before Western Zhou	418 BCE: to Qi
Xuqu	須句	Xuqu	Dongping County, Shandong	unknown	620 BCE: to Lu
Yan	燕	Bo (亳), or Shengju (聖聚)	Fangshan District, Beijing	King Wu's reign	222 BCE: to Qin
Yan	燕	Ji (薊)	Beijing	King Wu's reign	222 BCE: to Qin
Southern Yan	南燕	Yan	Yanjin County, Henan	unknown	unknown
Yan	鄢	Yan	Yanling County, Henan	King Wu's reign	769 BCE: to Zheng
Yang	陽	Yang	Yinan County, Shandong	unknown	660 BCE: to Qi
Yin	尹	Yin	Xin'an County, Henan	King Xuan's reign	unknown
Ying	應	Ying	Pingdingshan, Henan	King Cheng's reign	646 BCE: to Chu
Yu	邘 or 于	Yu	Qinyang, Henan	King Wu's reign	unknown
Yu	鄅	Yu	Linyi, Shandong	unknown	524 BCE: to Lu
Yuan	原	Yuan	Jiyuan, Henan	King Wu's reign	635 BCE: to Jin
Yue	越	Kuaiji (會稽)	Shaoxing, Zhejiang	unknown	306 BCE: to Chu
Yue	越	Langya (琅邪)	Jiaonan, Shandong	unknown	306 BCE: to Chu
Yue	越	Wu (吳)	Suzhou, Jiangsu	unknown	306 BCE: to Chu
Zeng, Sui	曾 or 隨	Sui	Suizhou, Hubei	unknown	unknown: to Chu
Zeng	鄫	Zeng	Fangcheng County, Henan	before Western Zhou	567 BCE: to Ju
Zhan	詹	unknown	unknown	827 BCE	unknown
Zhang	鄣	Zhang	Dongping County, Shandong	early Western Zhou	664 BCE: to Qi
Zheng	鄭	Zheng	Hua County, Shaanxi	806 BCE	375 BCE: to Han
Zheng	鄭	Xinzheng (新鄭)	Xinzheng, Henan	806 BCE	375 BCE: to Han
Zhongshan	中山	Gu (顧)	Dingzhou, Hebei	506 BCE	296 BCE: to Zhao
Zhongshan	中山	Lingshou (靈壽)	Lingshou County, Hebei	506 BCE	296 BCE: to Zhao
Zhou	周	Zhou	Fengxiang County, Shaanxi	King Wu's reign	unknown
Zhoulai	州來	Zhoulai	Fengtai County, Anhui	8th century BCE	528 BCE: to Chu
Zhu	祝	Zhu	Changqing District, Jinan, Shandong	King Wu's reign	768 BCE: to Qi
Zhu	鑄	Zhu	Feicheng, Shandong	King Wu's reign	unknown: to Qi
Zhuan	鄟	Zhuan	Tancheng, Shandong	unknown	585 BCE: to Lu
Zhuanyu	顓臾	Zhuanyu	Pingyi County, Shandong	King Wu's reign	unknown
Zou, Zhu	鄒 or 邾	Zhu (邾)	Qufu, Shandong	King Wu's reign	4th century BCE: to Chu
Zou, Zhu	鄒 or 邾	Zou (鄒)	Zoucheng, Shandong	King Wu's reign	4th century BCE: to Chu
Key:
Hegemon
Note: Capitals are listed in chronological order.
