= King Xie =

King Xie may refer to:

- Xie of Xia
- King Xie of Zhou (died 750 BC)
