= Bao Si =

Consort of King You of Zhou

Bao Si 褒姒
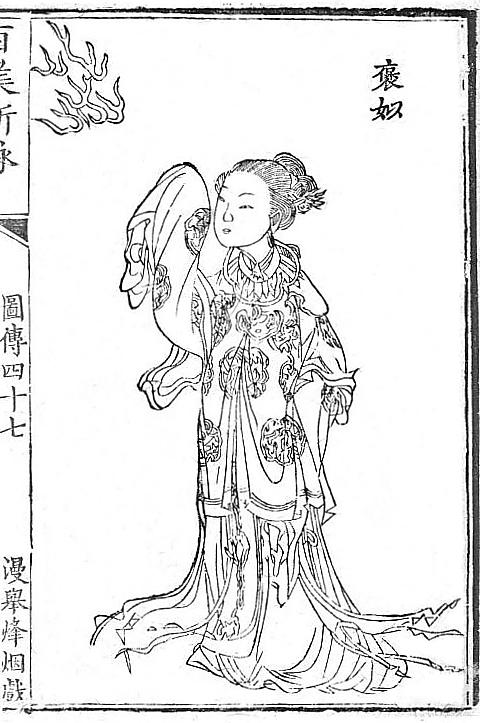
- An 18th-century depiction of Bao Si
- Tenure: 779/771 – 771 BC
- Spouse: King You of Zhou
- Issue: Bofu
- Dynasty: Western Zhou

Bao Si (Chinese: 褒姒; pinyin: Bāo Sì; Wade–Giles: Pao Ssu) was a concubine then consort of King You of Zhou. She was considered one of the most beautiful women of the ancient era.

== Life ==
Legends record that during the last years of the Xia dynasty, two dragons entered the palace of the king. Upon leaving, the king ordered that the dragons' saliva be kept in a wooden box. During the reign of King Li of Zhou, he tried to open the box despite a taboo against such an act. The saliva accidentally spilled, transforming into a black lizard. The lizard crawled in front of a seven-year-old slave girl. Eight years later, she became pregnant while still a virgin, and gave birth to a girl. The mother abandoned the baby, who was later adopted by a couple who traveled to the State of Bao and raised her to adulthood. She was later presented by the ruler of Bao to King You.

In 779 BC, Bao Si entered the palace and came into King You's favour. They had a son named Bofu. King You decided to depose Queen Shen and her son, Crown Prince Yijiu, and replace them with Bao Si and Bofu.

Bao Si was of a melancholic disposition, so King You offered a thousand ounces of gold to anyone who could make her laugh. Someone at the court suggested lighting the warning beacons on Mount Li, usually used to summon armies from the surrounding vassal states in times of danger. The nobles duly arrived at the court only to find themselves laughed at by Bao Si. Even after King You had impressed Bao Si, he continued to abuse his use of the warning beacons and so lost the trust of the nobles.

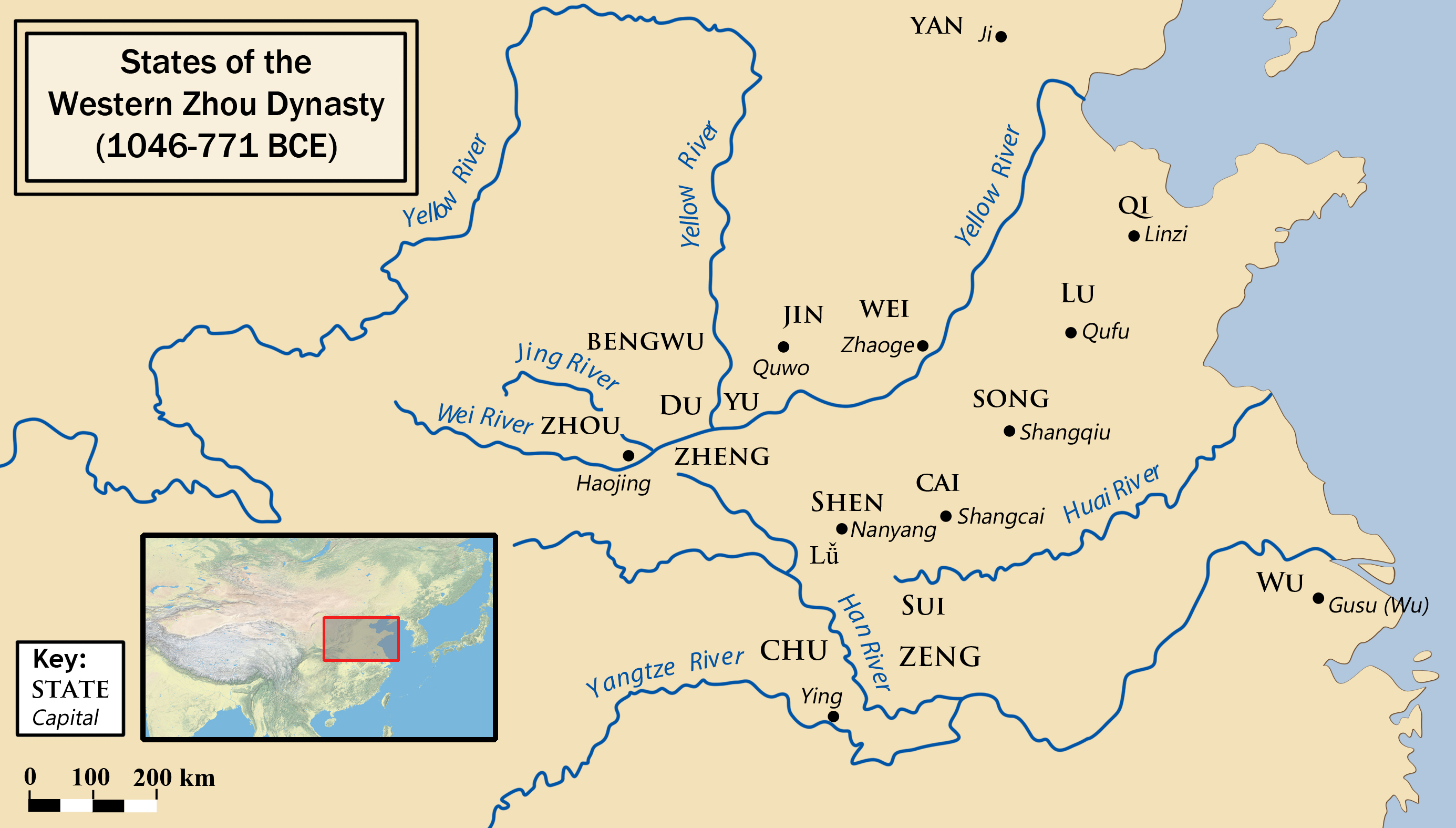
States of the Western Zhou dynasty

Queen Shen's father, the Marquis of Shen, was upset by the deposition of his daughter and grandson Yijiu and mounted an attack on King You's palace in conjunction with the Quanrong nomads. King You called for the nobles with the beacons, but none came as they no longer trusted him. In the end, King You and Bofu were killed, and Bao Si was captured at Xi (simplified Chinese: 戏; traditional Chinese: 戲) and taken to the Quanrong leader. King You's death marked the end of Western Zhou and the beginning of the Spring and Autumn period of the Eastern Zhou.

After her capture, the Marquis of Shen managed to get Bao Si for himself. Bao Si accepted a bribe from him and left the capital. Later, during another attack by the Quanrong nomads, Bao Si was unable to escape and hanged herself. Her date of death is unknown.

The story of Bao Si and King You of Zhou is among the best-known and infamous love stories from ancient China. It serves not only as a demonstration of extreme love but also as a cautionary tale of how one beauty can topple a nation, but this story is controversial. According to the record of Tsinghua Bamboo Slips, King You attacked the Marquis of Shen, and the Marquis of Shen allied with the Quanrong to defeat King You. However, warning beacons didn't exist during the Zhou dynasty, with the earliest warning beacons appearing during the Han dynasty. (Note: The Lüshi Chunqiu recorded a more plausible version of the story: instead of lighting beacons, drums were used to summon the vassal states' armies. King You ordered the drums to be beaten numerous times, with the same result of the nobles losing trust in the king.) Professor Liu Guozhong of Tsinghua University believes this story is fabricated.

Through the few references available, it can be presumed that Bao Si was born in 792 BC (three years younger than King You) and died in 771 BC (assuming that her death happened by suicide shortly after the Quanrong attack).

== Legacy ==
The Classic of Poetry houses multiple poems referring to Bao Si's activities in the Eastern Zhou court. One such poem, Jie Nan Shan (節南山), was written desperately by a poet named Ji Fu (姬父), identifying themselves with the art name Jia Fu (家父), and is one of few poems in the classic to have a named author. The poem accuses the corrupted king of not attending to his territory and deceiving his people, plunging the Zhou people into constant distress. Zheng Yue (正月) directly accuses Bao Si of destroying Zhou, whilst Shi Yue zhi Jiao (十月之交) lists her alongside other corrupted ministers.

Bao Si is mentioned prominently in the epic historical novel Chronicles of the Eastern Zhou Kingdoms, written by Feng Menglong, a late Ming dynasty writer. A poem pertaining to Bao Si is recorded as follows, translated from the original text by Olivia Milburn:

"First in her brocade silk bower she was called the mother of the nation,
Then in a stinking yurt she became a traitorous slut.
In the end she could not escape the pain of the tightening noose;
Would it not have been better to accept being a mere concubine?"

While Bao Si may have initially been seen as a virtuous woman, her legacy provides insight into how she was a major contributing factor to the Western Zhou in Chinese myth.

== See also ==
- Daji
- Four Beauties: Yang Guifei, Xi Shi, Wang Zhaojun, Diaochan
