= Bofu =

Son of Zhou dynasty monarch King You

Bofu (779 BCE – 771 BCE) (Chinese: 伯服), sometimes referred to as Bopan (伯盘), was the son of Chinese Zhou dynasty monarch King You of Zhou and his concubine Bao Si. After Baosi entered the royal palace, King You deposed Queen Shen (申后) and her son Crown Prince Yijiu, replacing them with Baosi and Bofu. King You and Bofu were both killed in 771 BCE by Quanrong nomads at Mount Li near Xi'an in present-day Shaanxi. Another source says that Bofu lived and contended for the throne with Queen Shen's son, King Ping of Zhou.
