= Dao (state) =

Historical state during the Zhou Dynasty

Dao 道
- Capital: Dào (Possibly north of modern day Quèshān County, Henan or south of Xī County, Henan)
- Common languages: Old Chinese

Dao (Chinese: 道; pinyin: Dào) was a Chinese vassal state during the Zhou dynasty (1046–221 BCE) located in the southern part of Runan County, Henan. Dao existed in the shadow of the powerful neighbouring State of Chu which was held in check by the equally powerful State of Qi. Whilst Duke Huan of Qi remained alive as one of the Five Hegemons, Qi maintained friendly relations with Dao along with the other small states of Jiang, Huang and Bai (柏) amongst others. When the Duke died in 643 BCE, civil disorder broke out in Qi and the State of Chu seized the opportunity to expand their territory northwards. The inhabitants of Dao were resettled in a place called Jingdi (荊地) until King Ping of Chu ascended the throne and restored Dao to its former territory. At some point Dao was finally exterminated by Chu although the time at which this occurred is currently unknown.
