= King Ping of Zhou =

First king of the Chinese Eastern Zhou dynasty (died 720 BC)

King Ping of Zhou 周平王
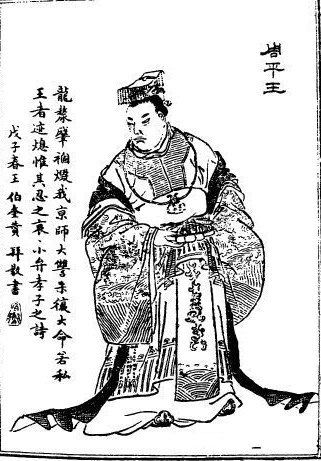

King of the Zhou dynasty
- Reign: 770–16 April 720 BCE
- Predecessor: King You of Zhou
- Successor: King Huan of Zhou
- Died: 16 April 720 BCE
- Issue: Crown Prince Xiefu; Prince Hu; Ruizu of Zhou (周睿祖)
Names
- Ancestral name: Jī (姬); Given name: Yíjiù (宜臼)
Posthumous name
- King Ping (平王)
- House: Ji
- Dynasty: Zhou (Eastern Zhou)
- Father: King You of Zhou
- Mother: Queen Shen

King Ping of Zhou

Posthumous name
- Chinese: 周平王
- Literal meaning: The Peaceful King of Zhou
Transcriptions
Standard Mandarin
- Hanyu Pinyin: Zhōu Píng Wáng
- Wade–Giles: Chou Píng-wang; King Píng of Chou

King Ping of Zhou (Chinese: 周平王; pinyin: Zhōu Píng Wáng; died 16 April 720 BCE), personal name Ji Yijiu, was the 13th king of China's Zhou dynasty and the first king of the Eastern Zhou dynasty.

== History ==
He was the son of King You of Zhou and Queen Shen (申后).

King You had exiled Queen Shen and Ji Yijiu after the king became enamoured with his concubine Bao Si and made her queen and his son Bofu his heir. As a result, Queen Shen’s father, the Marquess of Shen, joined with the Quanrong nomads and local satellite states to overthrow King You. In the Battle of Mount Li King You and Bofu were killed, and Bao Si was captured. Ji Yijiu ascended the throne. At about the same time, Jī Hàn (姬翰), Duke of Guó (虢公), elevated Jī Yúchén (姬余臣) to the throne as King Xie of Zhou (周携王), and the Zhou Dynasty saw a period of having two kings until King Xie was killed by Marquis Wen of Jin (晋文侯) in 750 BCE.

The Xinian manuscript, however, has challenged this traditional narrative. It seems to indicate that King Xie (also known as King Hui, or the King at Xie) was originally accepted by many of the regional lords over King Ping. After Marquis Wen of Jin killed Xie, there was not an officially accepted King of Zhou for 9 years, until, in 741 BCE, Marquis Wen recognized Ping. Three years later, in 738 BCE, Wen helped Ping move to Chengzhou.

King Ping moved the Western Zhou dynasty's capital east from Haojing to Luoyang, thus ending the Western Zhou and beginning the Eastern Zhou dynasty and the Spring and Autumn period. He is the first Zhou king to be mentioned in the chronological account of the Zuo Zhuan.

Over 14 centuries after King Ping’s death, Tang dynasty Empress regnant Wu Zetian claimed ancestry from King Ping through his son Prince Wu, and changed the dynastic name to Zhou, which was reverted to Tang after her death.

== Family ==
Sons:

- First son, Crown Prince Xiefu (太子洩父), the father of King Huan of Zhou
- Second son, Prince Hu (王子狐)
  - Served as a hostage of Duke Zhuang of Zheng
- Youngest son, Prince Wu (王子武)

== See also ==
- Family tree of ancient Chinese emperors

King Ping of Zhou Zhou dynasty Died: 720 BC
Regnal titles
Preceded by King You of Zhou	King of China; 770–16 April 720 BC	Succeeded by King Huan of Zhou
