= Mount Li =

Mountain in Shaanxi, China

Coordinates: 34°21′31″N 109°12′38″E

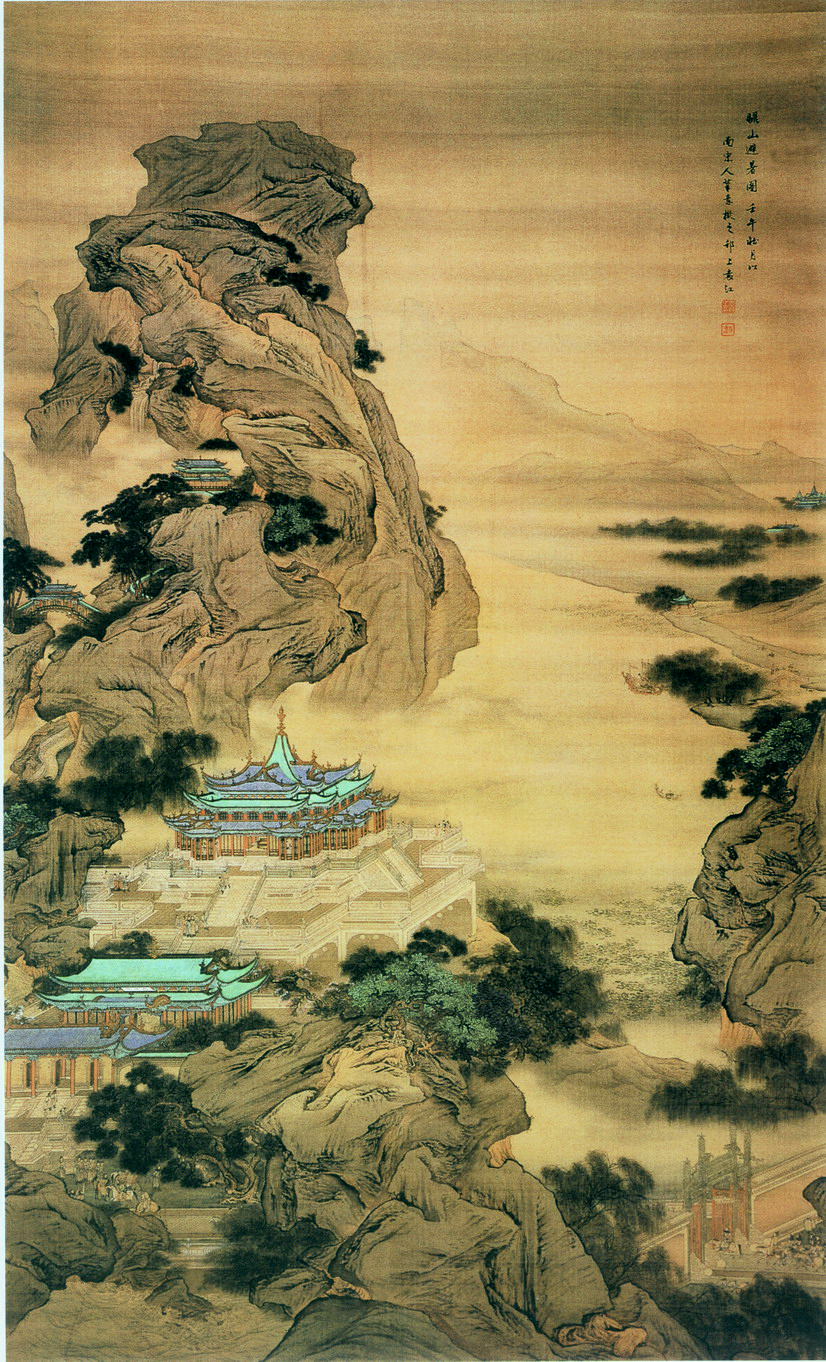
- Yuan Jiang's 1702 Mount Li Escaping the Heat
- Traditional Chinese: 驪山
- Simplified Chinese: 骊山
- Literal meaning: Mountain of the Pure Black Horse(s)
Transcriptions
Standard Mandarin
- Hanyu Pinyin: Líshān
- Wade–Giles: Li-shan

Mount Li, also known by its Chinese name as Lishan or Li Shan, is a mountain located in the northeast of Xi'an in Shaanxi Province, China. The mountain is part of the Qinling mountain range and rises to a height of 1302 metres (4271 ft) above sea level. It is one of the eight scenic spots of the Guanzhong Plain and popularly said to "shine like a beacon in the evening sunlight".

== Ancient era ==
Some ancient tales say that the literal Chinese name "Black Steed Mountain" stems from its resemblance to a horse whilst others that the name arose during the Shang and Zhou dynasties because the "Black Steed Tribe", lived in this area. Another legend cites the mountain as the place from where the Mount Li goddess Lishan Laomu and Nüwa, creator of mankind, repaired the wall of heaven. The two goddesses have long been worshipped on the same mountain.

In 771 BCE, King You of Zhou was slain at its foothills alongside his loyal vassal Duke Huan of Zheng. This marked the collapse of the mighty Western Zhou dynasty and began a very long age of endless conflict that devastated the Central Plains.

At the foot of the mountain is the necropolis of the first Emperor Qin Shi Huang, comprising his mausoleum and the Terracotta Army. Geographer Li Daoyuan of Northern Wei, recorded in Shui Jing Zhu that Mount Li was a favoured location due to its auspicious geology: "famed for its jade mines, its northern side was rich in gold, and its southern side rich in beautiful jade; the first emperor, covetous of its fine reputation, therefore chose to be buried there".

Huaqing Pool, a Tang dynasty royal hot-spring complex, stands at the foot of Mount Li.

== Republic of China era ==
On December 4, 1936, de facto Kuomintang (KMT) leader Chiang Kai-shek arrived in Shaanxi Province and stayed at Huaqingchi. His ostensible mission was to eradicate the local Communists and warlords, but instead he was kidnapped whilst hiding in a crevice on Li Mountain in what became known as the Xi'an Incident. After the incident, the KMT government built the simple "Minzu Fuxing Pavilion" (民族復興亭) at the foot of the crevice in commemoration.

The building was reconstructed using steel and concrete in 1946 with the relevant funds subscribed by students of the Whampoa Military Academy in Guangdong. It was renamed the "Zhengqi Pavilion" (正气亭) with inscriptions in the building eulogizing Chiang authored by senior KMT officers.

== People's Republic of China era ==
After the 1949 Communist victory, the pavilion was for a time called the "Seizing Chiang Pavilion" (捉蒋亭), finally adopting its current name of "Bingjian Pavilion" (兵谏亭; lit. 'stern advice backed by force') in 1986. Both terms refer to the Xi'an Incident.

Today, Li Mountain National Forest Park is a national level protected site and an AAAA rated tourist attraction classified as a cultural, and historic monument.
