= Haojing =

Archaeological site in Shaanxi, China

Hao
- Traditional Chinese: 鎬
- Simplified Chinese: 镐
- Literal meaning: Bright
Transcriptions
Standard Mandarin
- Hanyu Pinyin: Hào
- Wade–Giles: Hao^{4}

Haojing
- Traditional Chinese: 鎬京
- Simplified Chinese: 镐京
- Postal: Haoking
- Literal meaning: Bright Capital
Transcriptions
Standard Mandarin
- Hanyu Pinyin: Hàojīng
- Wade–Giles: Hao^{4}-ching^{1}

Zongzhou
- Chinese: 宗周
- Postal: Tsungchow
- Literal meaning: Ancestral Zhou
Transcriptions
Standard Mandarin
- Hanyu Pinyin: Zōngzhōu
- Wade–Giles: Tsung^{1}-chou^{1}

Hao or Haojing, also called Zongzhou, was one of the two settlements comprising the capital of the Western Zhou dynasty (c. 1046 – c. 771 BCE), the other being Feng or Fengjing (豐京). They stood on opposite banks of the Feng River (灃河), Feng on the west bank and Hao on the east, and were together known as Fenghao. Archaeological discoveries indicate that the ruins of Haojing lie next to the Feng River around the north end of Doumen Subdistrict (斗门街道) in present-day Xi'an, Shaanxi Province.

== History ==
Ji Chang (posthumously honored as King Wen) moved the predynastic Zhou capital eastward about 100 kilometers (62 mi) from Qiyi (岐邑) to Fengjing in the mid-11th century BCE. Traditional accounts place the move five years before the Battle of Muye, which present scholarship dates to c. 1046 BCE. After his son Fa (posthumously honored as King Wu) defeated the Shang and established the Zhou dynasty, he relocated his court across the Feng River to the shore of Lake Hao (鎬池, Hào Chí). Fengjing became the site of the Zhou ancestral shrine and gardens while Haojing contained the royal residence and government headquarters. The settlement was also known as Zongzhou to indicate its role as the capital of the vassal states, most ruled by clans claiming collateral descent from the royal Ji family.

During the reign of King Cheng (1042–1021 BCE), the Duke of Zhou built a second settlement at Luoyi, also known as Chengzhou (成周), in order to reinforce control of the eastern part of the kingdom. From then on, although King Cheng was permanently stationed in Chengzhou, Haojing remained the main operations center.

At the time of King Zhao (r. 996–977 BCE), further reinforcement of the eastern part of the Zhou kingdom took place and Chengzhou became the major center of operations.

In King You's reign (r. 781–771 BCE), the Marquess of Shen overran Haojing with support from Quanrong nomads from the west, heralding the end of the Western Zhou dynasty. All the royal buildings in Haojing were razed to the ground, although it is not known if those in Fengjing were as well. The newly enthroned King Ping (r. 770-720 BCE) thereafter had no choice but to formally move the capital east to Chengzhou. For some time after, there were still people who referred to themselves as "Western Zhou" and to Chengzhou as Zongzhou.

== See also ==
- Historical capitals of China
