= King You of Zhou =

Last king of the Western Zhou (795–771 BC)

King You of Zhou 周幽王
- 1928 illustration of King You and Bao Si.

King of the Zhou dynasty
- Reign: 781–771 BC
- Predecessor: King Xuan of Zhou
- Successor: King Ping of Zhou
- Born: Ji Gongsheng; 795 BC
- Died: 771 BC
- Consort: Bao Si
- Issue: King Ping of Zhou; Crown Prince Bofu
Names
- Ancestral name: Ji (姬); Given name: Gongsheng (宮湦) or Gongnie (宮涅)
Posthumous name
- King You (幽王)
- House: Ji
- Dynasty: Zhou (Western Zhou)
- Father: King Xuan of Zhou
- Mother: Queen Jiang

King You of Zhou

Posthumous name
- Chinese: 周幽王
- Literal meaning: "Quiet King of Zhou" / "Secluded King of Zhou"
Transcriptions
Standard Mandarin
- Hanyu Pinyin: Zhōu Yōu Wáng
- Wade–Giles: Chou Yōu-wang; King You of Chou

King You of Zhou (795–771 BC), personal name Ji Gongsheng, was the 12th king of the Chinese Zhou dynasty and the last king of the Western Zhou. He reigned from 781 to 771 BC.

== History ==
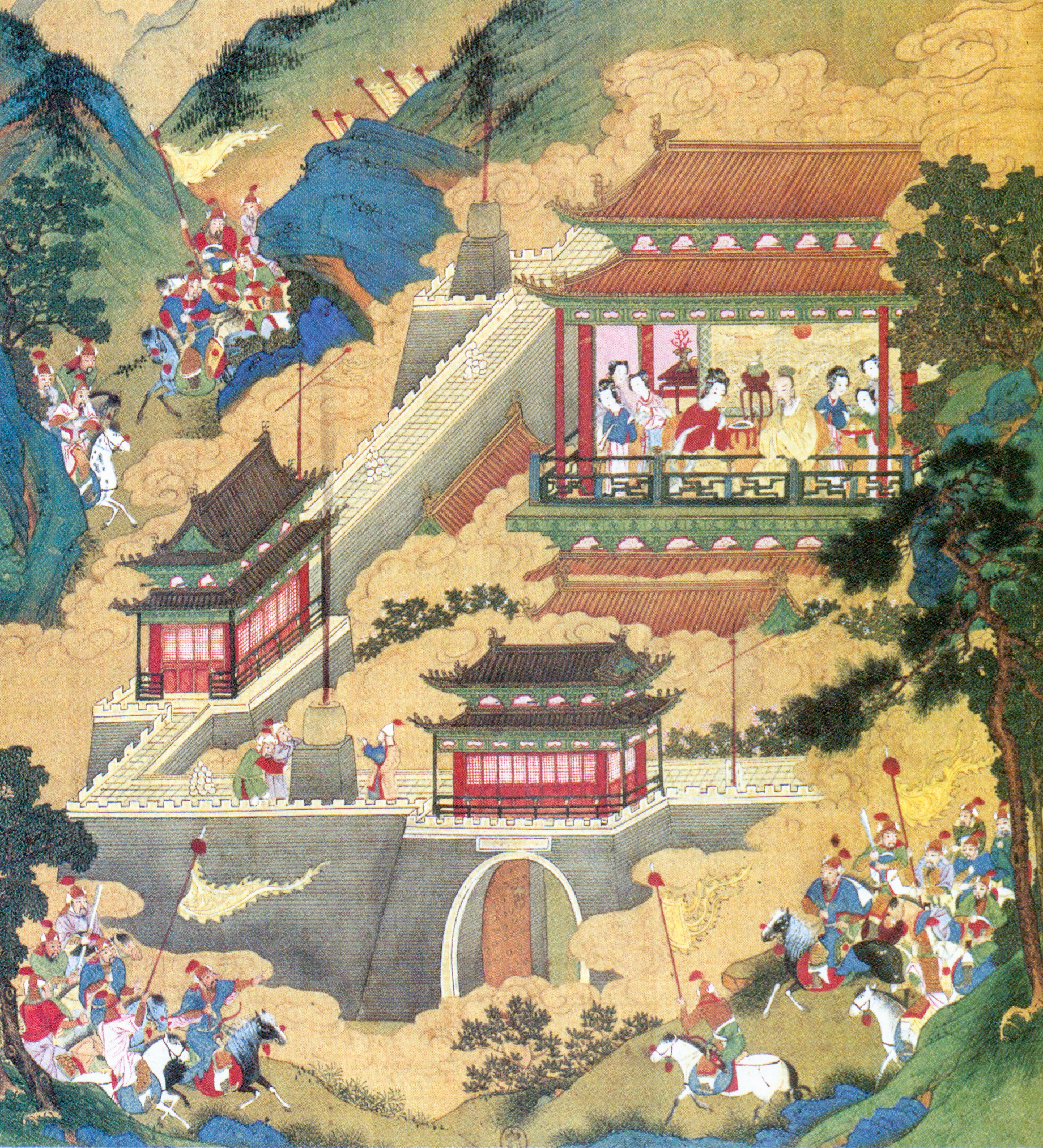
King You sounding the alarm to make Bao Si laugh.

In 780 BC, a major earthquake struck Guanzhong. A soothsayer named Bo Yangfu (伯陽甫) considered this an omen foretelling the destruction of the Zhou Dynasty.

In 779 BC, a concubine named Bao Si entered the palace and came into the King You's favour. They had a son named Bofu. King You deposed Queen Shen and Crown Prince Yijiu. He made Bao Si the new queen and Bofu the new crown prince.

Queen Shen's father, the Marquess of Shen, was furious at the deposition of his daughter and grandson Crown Prince Yijiu and mounted an attack on King You's palace with the Quanrong. King You called for his nobles by lighting the warning beacons on Mount Li. However, according to the Records of the Grand Historian, he had falsely lit the beacons in the past to amuse Bao Si. So his previous abuse of the beacon system meant that no nobles responded to his now genuine call for support. In the resulting battle, King You and Bofu were killed and Bao Si was captured.

With the death of King You, nobles including the Marquess of Shen, the Marquess of Zeng (繒侯) and Duke Wen of Xu supported the deposed Prince Yijiu becoming King Ping of Zhou and so the Zhou Dynasty was able to continue. As the national capital Haojing had suffered severe damage, and was located near the potentially dangerous Quanrong, in 771 BC, King Ping of Zhou moved the capital eastward to Luoyang, thus beginning the Eastern Zhou dynasty and ushering in the Spring and Autumn period which would last for more than 300 years.

== In literature ==
In the traditional Mao Commentary to the Classic of Poetry, the minor court hymn "Gather the Beans" (采菽; Cǎi Shū) is said to be a criticism of King You for squandering feudal lords' respect and humiliating them. Even so, this interpretation is disputed.

The Records of the Grand Historian states that Bao Si did not laugh easily. After trying many methods and failing, King You tried to amuse his favourite queen by lighting warning beacons and fooling his nobles into thinking that the Quanrong nomads were about to attack. The nobles arrived at the castle only to find Bao Si laughing at them for being fooled by the lit beacons. Even after King You had impressed Bao Si, he continued to misuse the warning beacons and lost the trust of the nobles. The earliest warning beacons appeared in the Han dynasty, so this story is considered to be fabricated. According to the Xinian, as recorded in the excavated Tsinghua Bamboo Slips, King You of Zhou attacked the Marquess of Shen, who allied with the Quanrong to defeat the royal army.

== Family ==
Queens:

- Queen Shen, of the Jiang clan of Shen (申後 姜姓), a daughter of the Marquess of Shen and the mother of Crown Prince Yijiu.

Concubines:

- Bao Si, of the Du lineage of the Qi clan of Bao (791–771 BC), a daughter of Du Bo; married in 779 BC; the mother of Crown Prince Bofu.

Sons:

- Crown Prince Yijiu (太子宜臼; d. 720 BC), ruled as King Ping of Zhou from 770 to 720 BC
- Crown Prince Bofu (779–771 BC)

== See also ==
- Family tree of Chinese monarchs (ancient)

King You of Zhou Zhou dynasty Died: 771 BC
Regnal titles
Preceded by King Xuan of Zhou	King of China; 781–771 BC	Succeeded by King Ping of Zhou
