= Quanrong =

Ancient northwestern Chinese ethnic group

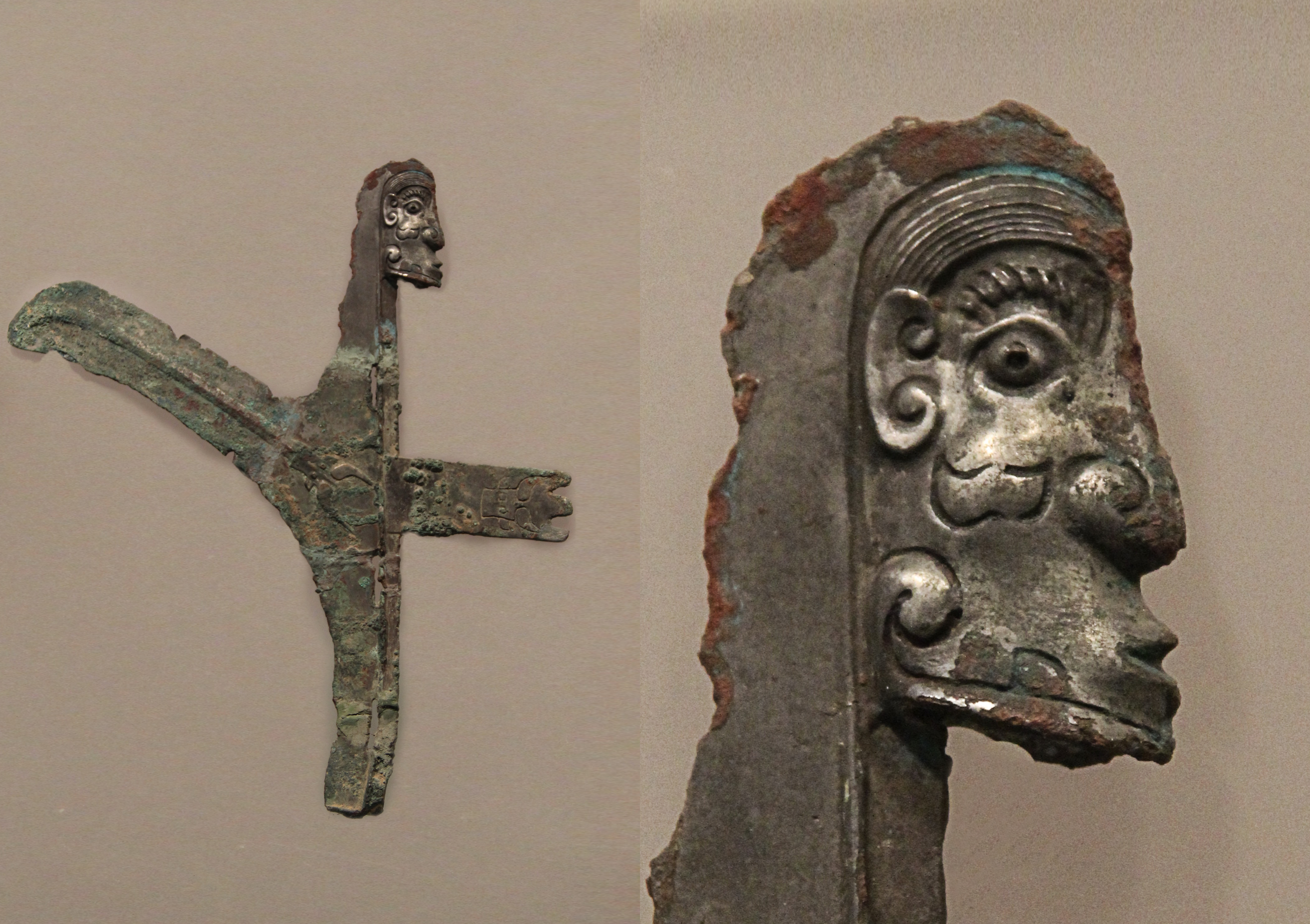
Anthropomorphic axe, bronze, excavated in the tomb of Heibo (潶伯), a military noble in charge of protecting the northern frontier, at Baicaopo, Lingtai County, Western Zhou period (1045–771 BCE). Gansu Museum. This is considered as a possible depiction of a Xianyun (who may be identical with the Quanrong) or Guifang.

The Quanrong (Chinese: 犬戎; pinyin: Quǎnróng) or Dog Rong (Note: The Quanrong are sometimes referred to as the Báigǒu (白狗 "White Dogs") or Báiláng (白狼 "White Wolves").) were an ethnic group, classified by the ancient Chinese as "Qiang", active in the northwestern part of China during and after the Zhou dynasty (1046–221 BCE). Their language or languages are considered to have been members of the Tibeto-Burman branch of the Sino-Tibetan languages.

== Etymology ==
Scholars believe Quanrong was a later name for the Xianyun 猃狁 (written with xian, defined as a kind of dog with a long snout [Erya] or a black dog with a yellow face [Shuowen Jiezi]). According to sinologist Li Feng, "It is very probable that when the term Xianyun came to be written with the two characters 獫狁, the notion of 'dog' associated with the character xian thus gave rise to the term Quanrong 犬戎, or the 'Dog Barbarians'."

Claiming ancestry from two white dogs, the Quanrong tribe worshipped a totem in the form of a white dog. They are classified as a nomadic tribe of the Qiang and were the sworn enemies of the Yanhuang tribe.

== History ==
According to the Book of the Later Han:

Former Emperor Gaoxin's (father of Emperor Yao) enemies were the Quanrong. The Emperor suffered violent invasion at their hands but did not retaliate.

The Discourses of Zhou in the Guoyu records that at the time of King Mu of Zhou the power of the Quanrong gradually increased. Conflicts during the king's reign made him consider a punitive expedition to the west against them. Duke of Zhai was against his father's plan: "this is not advisable. The illustrious former Emperors (Note: The Three Sovereigns and Five Emperors of Chinese mythology.) did not advocate the use of force." King Mu did not listen but won an unexpected victory in the subsequent clash, capturing the five kings of the Quanrong along with five white wolves and five white deer.

In 771 BCE, the Marquess of Shen invited the Quanrong to join him in an attack on King You of Zhou. The joint force subsequently occupied the Zhōu capital Haojing, killing King You and capturing his concubine Bao Si. In the end, the invaders left after taking a tribute from the Zhou and stealing the Nine Tripod Cauldrons. Duke Xiang of Qin sent an army to assist the Zhou as well as troops to escort King You's son and heir King Ping of Zhou to the eastern capital of Chengzhou, effectively ending the Western Zhou and ushering in the beginning of the Eastern Zhou dynasty and the tumultuous Spring and Autumn period.

At the time of Emperor Ming of Han (reigned 58–75 CE) it was said:

More than 1.3 million households, roughly six million people, offer tribute to the White Wolves and other clans.

During the reign of Emperor Taizong of Tang (reigned 626–649 CE), Court Academician Liǔ Kàng petitioned:

The Quanrong violate the mountain passes of Gansu and enter the (Tang) capital (Xi'an) without bloodshed ...

The traditional base of the Quanrong is modern Wēiróng Town in Jingning County, Gansu.

== See also ==
- Xirong (people)
- Shan Rong
- Murong
- Gyalrong people
- Qiang people
- Chunwei
- Guifang
- Xianyun
