= Zhouyu, Duke of Wey =

Ruler of Wey in 719 BC

Zhouyu 州籲

Ruler of Wey
- Reign: 719 BC
- Predecessor: Duke Huan of Wey
- Successor: Duke Xuan of Wey
- Born: Zhouyu
- Died: 719 BC; Pu (濮), Wey (now Puyang)
- Father: Duke Zhuang I of Wey

Zhouyu (Note: Also romanized as Zhouxu) (simplified Chinese: 州吁; traditional Chinese: 州籲; pinyin: Zhōu Yū, died 719 BC) was a son of Duke Zhuang of Wey who was briefly the Duke of Wey in 719 BC after he murdered his elder brother, the Duke Huan of Wey. Less than a year into his reign, he was arrested in the state of Chen at the behest of the Wey Minister Shi Que and killed. He was not given a posthumous name because of his characterization of being an usurper and his short reign.

== Background ==
Prince Zhouyu was born to Duke Zhuang of Wey and one of his favourite concubines. His father doted on him and allowed him to pursue his military interests unrestrained, though Zhuang Jiang, Duke Zhuang's principal wife, detested him.

While Duke Zhuang was still deciding which of his sons should succeed him, Shi Que, a Wey minister, remonstrated with him to decide whether he wanted Zhouyu to be his heir. Shi Que argued that if Duke Zhuang did not want to choose Zhouyu as his heir, he should stop Zhouyu from engaging in any further military pursuits, as he could pose a threat to the heir later on. Duke Zhuang did not heed this advice. In 735 BC, Prince Wan, Zhouyu's elder brother, succeeded Duke Zhuang. He would become known as Duke Huan of Wey.

Upon the accession of Duke Huan, Shi Que retired, ostensibly due to his age. Shi Hou, Shi Que's son, associated himself with Prince Zhouyu despite his father's ban on him doing so.

In 733 BC, Duke Huan dismissed Zhouyu from all his posts on account of his arrogance, and Zhouyu fled from Wey. In exile, he attempted to befriend Gongshu Duan, younger brother of Duke Zhuang of Zheng, after Gongshu's failed rebellion against Zhuang and subsequent exile in 722 BC.

== Regicide and Reign ==
In 719 BC, Zhouyu, after gathering fellow Wey exiles, killed Duke Huan and made himself the new duke. To consolidate his power, Zhouyu tried to make use of the previous animosity between Wey and Zheng as well as seeking the support of other states. He persuaded Duke Shang of Song, who had recently acceded to the Song throne, to attack Zheng together with Chen and Cai, his rival Prince Ping of Song having recently fled to Zheng. In addition, Zhouyu sought to help Gongshu Duan to take the Zheng throne. However, Zhouyu's attack on Zheng was unsuccessful; the allied force besieged the eastern gate of Xinzheng, Zheng's capital, in the summer of 719 BC for five days but then retreated. Another attack on Zheng in the autumn of the same year, this time joined by troops from Lu, was also unsuccessful.

== Death and Succession ==
Zhouyu remained unpopular in Wey. Duke Yin of Lu once asked Zhong Zhong, one of his officials, whether or not Zhouyu could succeed to hold the throne in Wey. Zhong Zhong replied that Zhouyu, depending on cruelty and weaponry to secure his rule rather than virtue, would eventually fail.

Shi Hou, now an official serving Zhouyu, asked his father Shi Que about how to stabilise Zhouyu's rule. Shi Que advised him that a visit by Zhouyu to the King of Zhou would be a good idea. When questioned further about how to gain the king's audience, Shi Que suggested that Zhouyu first visit Duke Huan of Chen, who was favoured by King Huan of Zhou, to ask for an audience through him. Shi Hou agreed with this suggestion; he and Zhouyu went to Chen.

Meanwhile, Shi Que sent a messenger to Duke Huan of Chen to declare that it was Zhouyu and Shi Hou who had murdered Duke Huan of Wey and to ask Chen authorities to arrest them, which they did. Shi Que sent Naoyang Jian, a retainer of the Shi clan, to Chen with instructions to execute Shi Hou. Zhouyu was executed after he was returned to Wey. The Chinese chengyu 大義滅親 ("Killing one's relatives for the sake of justice"), attested in Zuo Zhuan, came from this episode of Shi Que killing his own son for the sake of righteousness.

After this, Wey officials went to the state of Xing to invite Prince Jin, who had been sent to Xing as a political hostage, to return to Wey to be the new ruler. Prince Jin would become known as Duke Xuan of Wey.

== Bibliography ==
- Zuo Zhuan, Duke Yin
- Shiji, vol. 14, 37
- Durrant, Stephen; Li, Wai-yee; Schaberg, David (2016). Zuo Tradition/Zuozhuan: Commentary on the "Spring and Autumn Annals" (1st ed.). Seattle: University of Washington Press. ISBN 978-0-295-99915-9.
