= Duke Yin of Lu =

Ruler of Chinese state of Lu from 722 to 712 BC

Duke Yin of Lu 魯隱公

Ruler of Lu
- Reign: 722-30 November 712 BC
- Predecessor: Duke Hui of Lu
- Successor: Duke Huan of Lu
- Died: 30 November 712 BC
Names
- Ancestral name: Ji (姬); Given name: Xigu (息姑)
Posthumous name
- Duke Yin (隱公)
- House: Ji
- Dynasty: Lu
- Father: Duke Hui of Lu
- Mother: Sheng Zi (聲子)

Duke Yin of Lu (Chinese: 魯隱公; pinyin: Lǔ Yǐn Gōng, died 30 November 712 BC), personal name Ji Xigu, was a duke of the Lu state, reigning from 722 to 712 BC. He is notable in Chinese history as being the first ruler of Lu whose reign was recorded by the Spring and Autumn Annals and, by extension, its commentaries such as the Zuo Zhuan, the Gongyang Zhuan, and the Guliang Zhuan.

== Biography ==
=== Accession ===
In 723 BC, Duke Hui of Lu died after 46 years of reign. Prince Gui (軌), born to the late Duke's main wife, (Note: According to the Shiji, Prince Gui's mother, who was from Song, was meant to marry Prince Xigu, but Duke Hui made her his own wife upon seeing her.) was to succeed to the throne. However, Prince Gui was young, so Prince Xigu, his elder brother born to a concubine, was installed on the throne with the tacit understanding that he would abdicate in favour of Prince Gui upon his becoming an adult. The Zuo Zhuan points out that the Spring and Autumn Annals makes no mention of Duke Yin's accession in the entry for his first year of his reign because Duke Yin was "acting as regent".

=== Reign ===
Duke Yin's reign began by his creating goodwill with Lu's neighbours. In spring 722 BC, Duke Yin swore a covenant with the Viscount of Zhu at Mie (蔑). In the autumn of the same year, he swore a covenant with Song at Su (宿), which, according to the Zuo Zhuan, was Lu's first diplomatic contact with that state. The next year, in spring 721 BC, Duke Yin met with a Rong tribe at Qian (潛) to restore the good relations that had existed during the reign of Duke Hui. The Rong asked Duke Yin to swear a covenant, but Duke Yin refused. However, Duke Yin eventually agreed to a covenant in the autumn of the same year, conducting the ceremonies at Tang (唐).

In 719 BC, Prince Zhouyu of Wey usurped the Wey throne by murdering Duke Huan of Wey, his elder brother. Soon after, in order to establish his legitimacy, he forged an alliance with the nearby powers, Song, Chen, and Cai to attack Zheng, which had been on unfriendly terms with Wey for generations. After multiple expeditions during the year, in autumn Duke Shang of Song sent an envoy to Lu to seek support. Although Duke Yin declined to provide support, Prince Hui (翬; also known as Yufu or 羽父) reinforced the allied army with a force despite the Duke's prohibition. Later in the same year, Zhouyu's forces were defeated and, failing to garner support, Zhouyu was captured and executed.

In spring 718 BC, Duke Yin planned to visit the fisheries at Tang (唐), a place near the Lu border. This attracted strong complaint from his uncle Zang Xibo, who remonstrated that "a ruler is the one who guides the people into the right paths and the proper usage of objects" and that the procurement of ordinary articles was "the affairs of menial labourers, and the duties of petty officers". Despite this criticism, Duke Yin departed for Tang, but not without excusing himself by saying, "I will inspect the borderlands". Zang Xibo did not accompany him, claiming illness. Duke Yin showed contrition after Zang Xibo's death in the winter of the same year, saying, "My uncle (Note: Zang Xibo was a brother of Duke Hui.) was resentful of me, the unworthy one. I would not presume to forget that." Duke Yin granted Zang Xibo a posthumous promotion during his funeral.

In spring 713 BC, Duke Yin made an alliance with Qi and Zheng to attack Song at Zhongqiu (中丘). The attack began in the summer of the same year, the allied army taking multiple cities from Song.

In spring 712 BC, the Marquises of Teng and Xue visited Duke Yin. They argued over their order of seniority, with the Marquis of Xue arguing that Xue was enfeoffed first while the Marquis of Teng argued that he was a descendent of a high official of the Zhou court and the royal clan. Duke Yin arbitrated this dispute by sending Prince Hui to them to say that the descendants of the royal clan take precedence in meetings hosted by the royal clan, while, should he visit the Xue court, he would allow those of Xue's ruling clan to take precedence. The Marquis of Xue then agreed to have the Marquis of Teng take precedence.

In autumn 712 BC, Duke Yin attacked the state of Xǔ along with Qi and Zheng. After a short siege, the capital of Xǔ was conquered, and its duke fled to Wey. Duke Xi of Qi intended to give the newly-conquered land to Lu, but Duke Yin declined, saying:

You, my lord, stated that Xǔ had not presented tribute, and that is why we followed you to chastise it. Xǔ already has submitted to punishment for its crimes. Even though you have issued a command, I, the unworthy one, would not presume to agree to what I have heard.

The Duke of Qi then gave the land to Zheng instead. Xǔ would eventually regain its independence in 697 BC.

=== Death and Succession ===
In late 712 BC, Prince Hui made an offer to Duke Yin that he would kill Prince Gui so that Duke Yin could take the throne once and for all in exchange for a high governmental position. Duke Yin refused to take up the offer. Fearing that his plot could be revealed, Prince Hui went to Prince Gui and offered to murder Duke Yin for him instead. Prince Gui agreed. So Prince Hui sent brigands to the house of the head of the Wei (寪) clan, in which Duke Yin had been fasting for a sacrifice, and assassinated Duke Yin. Prince Gui then succeeded Duke Yin to the throne of Lu and was known as Duke Huan of Lu. Later, Prince Hui blamed the Wei clan for the murder of Duke Yin and killed some of its members.

== Bibliography ==
- Zuo Zhuan, Duke Yin, Duke Huan
- Gongyang Zhuan, Duke Yin
- Shiji, vol. 33
- Durrant, Stephen; Li, Wai-yee; Schaberg, David (2016). Zuo Tradition/Zuozhuan: Commentary on the "Spring and Autumn Annals" (1st ed.). Seattle: University of Washington Press. ISBN 9780295999159.
- Miller, Harry (2015). The Gongyang Commentary on The Spring and Autumn Annals. New York: Palgrave Macmillan US. doi:10.1057/9781137493002 ISBN 978-1-349-50514-2

Duke Yin of Lu House of Ji Cadet branch of the House of Ji Died: 712 BC
Regnal titles
Preceded by Duke Hui of Lu	Duke of Lu; 722-712 BC	Succeeded by Duke Huan of Lu
