= Duke Zhuang =

Duke Zhuang may refer to these rulers from ancient China:

- Duke Zhuang of Qin (died 778 BC)
- Duke Zhuang of Zheng (757–701 BC)
- Duke Zhuang I of Qi (died 731 BC)
- Duke Zhuang of Chen (died 693 BC)
- Duke Zhuang of Lu (died 662 BC)
- Duke Zhuang II of Qi (died 548 BC)

== See also ==
- King Zhuang (disambiguation)
