= Duke Zhuang of Lu =

Duke Zhuang of Lu 魯莊公

Ruler of Lu
- Reign: 693-11 August 662 BC
- Predecessor: Duke Huan of Lu
- Successor: Ziban
- Died: 662 BC
- Spouse: Ai Jiang (daughter of Duke Huan of Qi); Shu Jiang (daughter of Duke Huan of Qi); Men Ren; Cheng Feng
- Issue: Ziban; Duke Min of Lu; Duke Xi of Lu; Sui (遂)
Names
- Ancestral name: Ji (姬); Given name: Tong (同)
Posthumous name
- Duke Zhuang (莊公)
- House: Ji
- Dynasty: Lu
- Father: Duke Huan of Lu
- Mother: Wen Jiang

Duke Zhuang of Lu (Chinese: 魯莊公; pinyin: Lǔ Zhuāng Gōng; 7 October 706 BC – 11 August 662 BC), personal name Ji Tong (姬同), was a duke of the Lu state during the Spring and Autumn period of Chinese history.

== Early life ==
Duke Zhuang was a son of Duke Huan of Lu and his main wife Wen Jiang, a daughter of Duke Xi of Qi. His parents were married in 709 BC, and he was born three years later, in 706 BC. After he was born, Duke Huan asked a man named Shen Ru (申繻) for a recommendation of a name. Shen Ru suggested that names must not come from important objects, since names would, sooner or later, become taboos. Duke Huan named his newborn son, who shared his birthday, Tong (同), meaning "the same."

== Reign ==
Tong succeeded his father after he was murdered in Qi by the orders of Duke Xiang of Qi in 694 BC.

=== Role in the succession of Qi ===
In 686 BC, Prince Wuzhi of Qi usurped the Qi throne by murdering Duke Xiang of Qi. However, he himself was murdered after a year. This triggered a race to the throne between two of Duke Xiang's brothers: Prince Xiaobai (小白), who sought refuge at the State of Ju and Prince Jiu (糾), who did the same at the State of Lu. Despite Duke Zhuang backing Prince Jiu militarily, Prince Xiaobai won the race by reaching the Qi capital first. He would become known as Duke Huan of Qi, one of the Five Hegemons of the Spring and Autumn period. Prince Jiu was forced to return to Lu with Guan Zhong and Shao Hu (召忽), his tutors. Duke Zhuang later launched an invasion of Qi to install Prince Jiu to the Qi throne, but was defeated at Qianshi in summer 685 BC.

A Qi force soon counterattacked Lu. Its commander, Bao Shuya, sent a letter to Duke Zhuang on Duke Huan's behalf:

[Prince] Jiu is our kinsman. We ask you to chastise him. Guan Zhong and Shao Hu are our enemies. We ask you to hand them over, and we will be satisfied.” (Note: The Shiji gives a harsher version of this letter, which demanded that Duke Zhuang kill Prince Jiu and threatened to besiege Lu should he not comply.)

Prince Jiu was killed, while Shao Hu committed suicide. Guan Zhong asked to become prisoner himself, but after Bao Shuya brought him back to Qi, he released him. Indeed, Duke Huan of Qi had wished to kill Guan Zhong, but Bao Shuya convinced him that Guan Zhong would be indispensable in order to achieve hegemony.

=== Later reign ===
In 684 BC, Qi attacked Lu once again, but Qi was defeated by Duke Zhuang at Changshao, at which he personally lead the Lu army, with the aid of Cao Gui (曹劌), an official of common birth.

In 681 BC, Duke Zhuang of Lu met with Duke Huan of Qi at Ke (柯), a place in Qi. During this meeting, Cao Mo (曹沫), an official in Duke Zhuang's entourage, held Duke Huan hostage, demanding that Duke Huan return Lu lands that Qi had conquered some time ago. Duke Huan acquiesced, and an agreement was made. Though Duke Huan desired to renege on this agreement, Guan Zhong ultimately persuaded him against it. The land was eventually returned to Lu.

=== Death and succession ===
In 662 BC, Duke Zhuang fell ill. He consulted Prince Ya (牙) and Prince You (友), his brothers, about succession. He first spoke to Prince Ya, who voiced support for Prince Qingfu (慶父), another of their brothers. Then, he spoke to Prince You, who, after voicing support for Ziban (子般), Duke Zhuang's son, was told by Duke Zhuang about Prince Ya's opinion. Prince You then coerced Prince Ya to commit suicide by drinking poisoned wine by saying: "Drink this and you will have posterity in the domain of Lu. If you do not do this, you will die and have no posterity." Prince Ya did so. Gongyang Zhuan points out that in addition to voicing support for Prince Qingfu, Prince Ya had also insinuated that Lu's tradition of alternating between father-to-son succession and brother-to-brother succession ought to be followed. Duke Zhuang had inherited the Lu throne from his father.

Duke Zhuang died in 662 BC and was succeeded by Ziban, but he would be killed less than a year later by Qingfu, who installed Ziban's brother Qi (啟) to the throne. The reign of Qi, who would become known as Duke Min of Lu, would also be a short one, as Qingfu would murder him as well two years into his reign in 660 BC.

== Bibliography ==
- Zuo Zhuan, Duke Huan, Duke Zhuang
- Gongyang Zhuan, Duke Zhuang
- Shiji, vol. 32, 33
- Dong, Zhongshu; Queen, Sarah A.; Major, John S. (2016). Luxuriant gems of the spring and autumn. Translations from the Asian classics. New York: Columbia University Press. ISBN 978-0-231-16932-5
- Durrant, Stephen; Li, Wai-yee; Schaberg, David (2016). Zuo Tradition/Zuozhuan: Commentary on the "Spring and Autumn Annals" (1st ed.). Seattle: University of Washington Press. ISBN 9780295999159.
- Miller, Harry (2015). The Gongyang Commentary on The Spring and Autumn Annals. New York: Palgrave Macmillan US. doi:10.1057/9781137493002. ISBN 978-1-349-50514-2
- Blakeley, Barry B (1977). "Functional Disparities in the Socio-Political Traditions of Spring and Autumn China: Part I: Lu and Ch'i". Journal of the Economic and Social History of the Orient. 20 (2). doi:10.2307/3631778.

Duke Zhuang of Lu House of Ji Cadet branch of the House of Ji Died: 662 BC
Regnal titles
| Preceded by Duke Huan of Lu | Duke of Lu; 693-662 BC | Succeeded by Ziban |
