= Battle of Changshao =

684 BC battle

Coordinates: 36.373932°N 117.721033°E

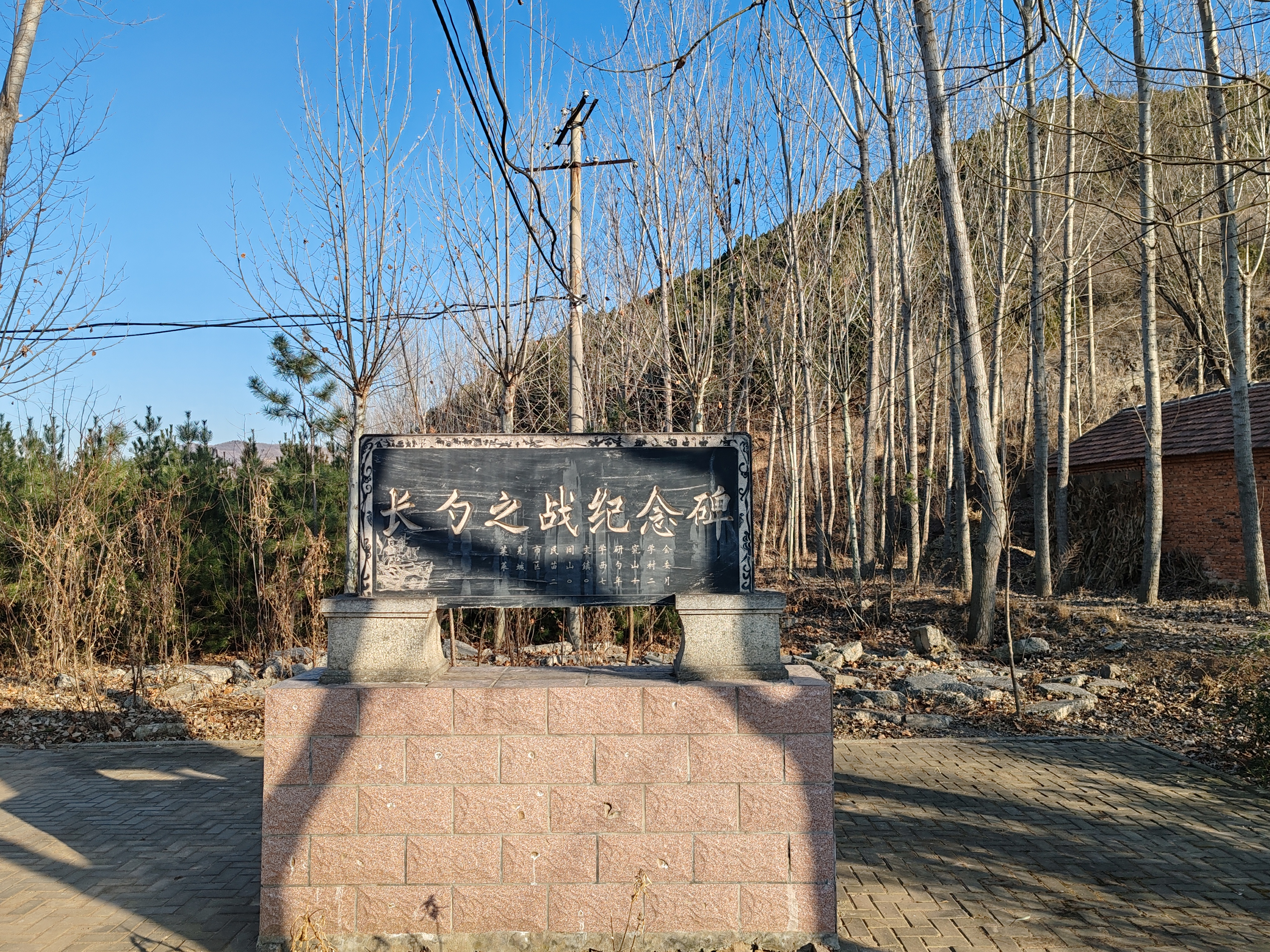
- The site where the battle took place, in today's Laiwu
Date	January, 684 BC
Location	Changshao, near today's Laiwu, Shandong province of China
Result	Victory of Lu

Belligerents
State of Qi	State of Lu

Commanders and leaders
Unknown (not mentioned in the history record)	Duke Zhuang of Lu; Cao Gui

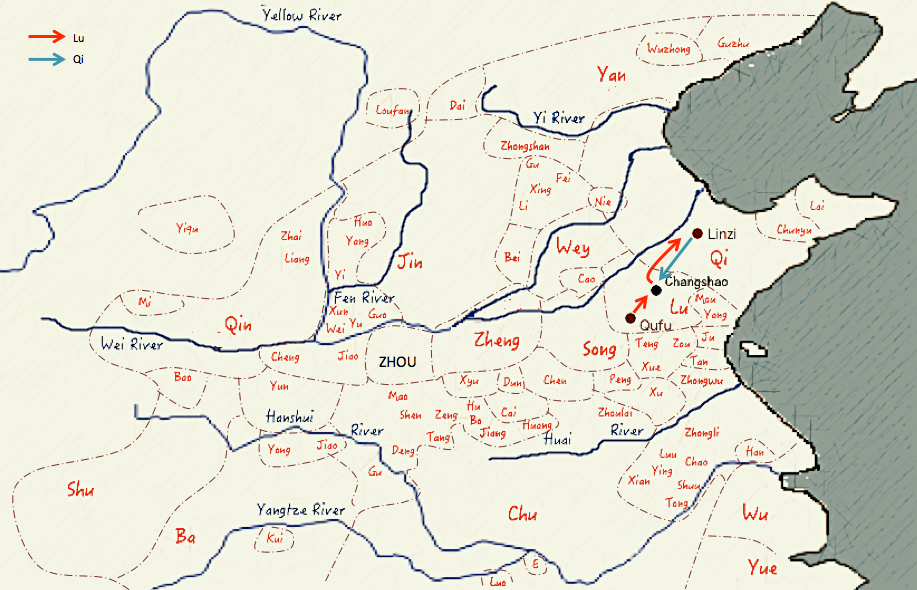
The overall situation of Spring and Autumn period during the Battle of Changshao

The Battle of Changshao (Chinese: 長勺之戰) was a military conflict between Qi and Lu, two major principality states in the Shandong Peninsula during the Spring and Autumn period of the Zhou dynasty. The battle happened in the January (lunar calendar) of 684 BC at Changshao. Lu claimed the victory under the lead of general Cao Gui (曹劌). This battle is described in detail by Zuo Qiuming in his Spring and Autumn Commentary of Zuo (Zuozhuan), but it is not mentioned in Sima Qian's book of Shi Ji. This battle is considered as a classic example of winning by good military strategies, and the well-known chengyu — 鼓作氣 (yī gŭ zuò qì, lit. 'first drum creates spirit', explained below) was derived from Cao Gui's assessment of the battle, as recorded by the Zuozhuan.

== Background ==
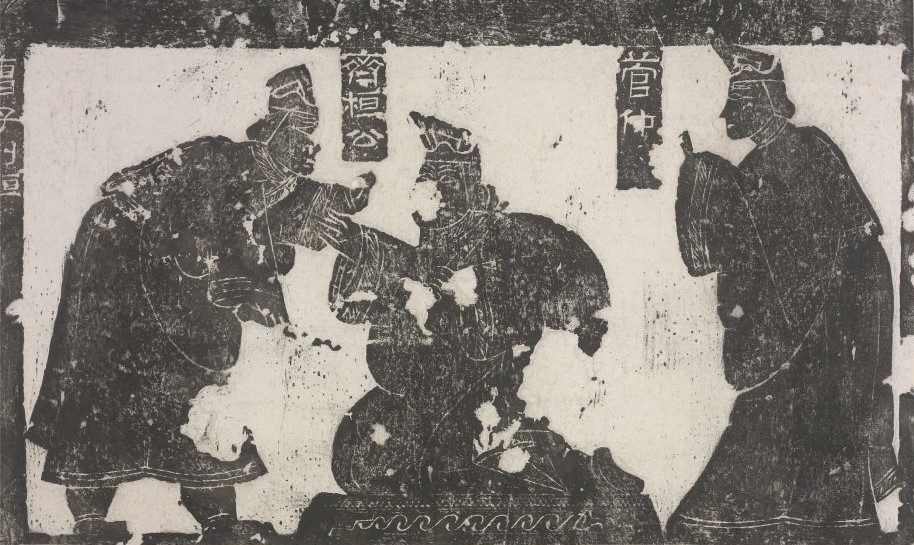
Duke Huan of Qi (middle) and Guan Zhong (right) depicted on Wu Family Shrines stone-relief.

Duke Xiang of Qi was assassinated in 686 BC; one month later, his successor was also assassinated. Duke Xiang's younger son, Xiaobai, took the throne in the spring of 685 BC as the Duke Huan of Qi. Duke Huan's elder brother, Lord Jiu, believed that he was the right person to take the throne, so he allied with Duke Zhuang of Lu and launched a war against Duke Huan. However, the army of the State of Lu was defeated by Qi in the Battle of Qianshi, and Duke Zhuang of Lu was almost killed in the battle. Realizing that the State of Lu was supporting Lord Jiu, Duke Huan of Qi was annoyed. He planned to attack Lu as revenge.

== Battle ==
In the spring of 684 BC, Duke Huan of Qi ordered his army to attack Lu. Cao Gui was appointed as the general of Lu to defend the state. Duke Zhuang of Lu was also present at the frontline along with Cao Gui. Cao Gui asked the army of Lu to stand still in the battle formation and fortifications and not to fight back until his order. The army of Qi charged twice but the army of Lu stayed in the fortifications and did not respond. When the Qi soldiers started their third charge, Cao Gui ordered the army of Lu to launch a counterattack. At this point, soldiers of Qi were tired and could hardly concentrate, so they were defeated. Duke Zhuang of Lu immediately ordered soldiers of Lu to chase the fleeing Qi army. Cao Gui accepted the order after making sure that there was no ambush. The Qi army was completely destroyed and expelled out of the border.

After the victory, when the Duke asked for an explanation of the success, Gui replied, "[the key to victory in] battle lies in the spirit [of courage and fortitude]: at the first drum beat (i.e., order to charge) [the Qi soldiers'] spirits were raised. On the second time, their spirits declined. Finally, on the third time, their spirits had been exhausted. Their spirits were exhausted while [those of] our [soldiers'] still brimmed. Consequently we defeated them."

The direct quote, "the first drum raises spirits" (一鼓作氣) has become a chengyu (classical four-character idiom) that expresses the idea that one should aim to complete a difficult task by giving one's best, sustained effort on a favorable occasion when one is most encouraged and confident of success, rather than to waver in one's effort and have to try again on a future occasion, at which time one might well have lost confidence or enthusiasm. Thus the meaning is similar to the English expression, "strike while the iron is hot."

== See also ==
- Spring and Autumn Commentary of Zuo, the chapter of Duke Zhuang of Lu
