= Duan Yihe =

Chinese politician

Duan Yihe

Duan Yihe (Chinese: 段义和; pinyin: Duàn Yìhé; January 17, 1946 – September 5, 2007) was a Chinese politician and a senior lawmaker in Jinan, the capital of Shandong Province. He was a member of the 10th National People's Congress and served as Chairman of the Standing Committee of the Jinan Municipal People's Congress from 2001 to 2007. Duan, together with his nephew-in-law, was executed in September 2007 for murdering his mistress, who was killed by a car bomb. It is considered one of the most shocking crimes involving a Chinese official. Duan was the sixth provincial-ministerial level official to be executed in China since 1978.

== Life and career ==
Duan was born on January 17, 1946, in Qihe County, Shandong, and graduated from Xi'an Jiaotong University in August 1970. He subsequently worked in Tianjin for six years before returning to his home province, working as a young cadre in the Organization Department of the Shandong Provincial Communist Party Committee. He was later promoted to head of the provincial Intellectuals Works Office and deputy director of the Shandong Electronics Industry Bureau. From February 1994 to September 1995, he served as deputy party secretary of Liaocheng Prefecture, where he met his future mistress Liu Haiping (Chinese: 柳海平), who was 18 at the time and 30 years Duan's junior.

After returning to Jinan, Duan was promoted to deputy chief of the Jinan Municipal Party Committee in December 1997, and director of the Jinan Organization Department. He was elected to the National People's Congress and served as Chairman of the Standing Committee of the Jinan Municipal People's Congress from 2001 to 2007, becoming a vice-provincial level official. He was the head of Jinan's delegation to the 10th National People's Congress.

== Murder of mistress ==
At 5 pm on July 9, 2007, a powerful remote-controlled bomb exploded in a Honda sedan on Jianshe Road in central Jinan. The explosion instantly killed the car's driver, Liu Haiping, whose upper torso landed more than 20 metres (66 ft) away. The bomb also injured two passers-by. A photograph of the blackened skeleton of the Honda sedan went viral on the Internet.

Duan was arrested just four days after the bombing. Liu, a divorced woman, had been his mistress for 13 years. She had worked as a waitress in the cafeteria of the People's Congress, but was elevated to the position of a mid-level government official after she became Duan's mistress. He had bought her a house and used his power to secure jobs for her relatives. However, Liu kept asking for more money and demanded that Duan divorce his wife and marry her, which would have seriously damaged his government career. To get rid of her, Duan asked policeman Chen Zhi (陈志), the husband of his niece, to create a "traffic accident". Chen Zhi then enlisted Chen Changbing (陈常兵), owner of a local auto repair shop, to help plant the bomb in Liu's car.

== Trial and execution ==
Duan was tried at the Zibo Intermediate People's Court in August 2007. During the trial, Duan claimed that he did not want to kill his mistress and only asked Chen Zhi to make Liu "lose her ability to think", and that Liu's death was caused by Chen's error when executing the plot. On August 9, 2007, the court ruled that Duan and Chen Zhi were both guilty of murder and sentenced them to death. Chen Changbing was convicted as an accomplice to murder and given a life sentence. In addition to murder, Duan was also convicted of taking bribes worth CN¥1.69 million (equivalent to US$223,800 at the time). He also had assets worth CN¥1.3 million (US$176,000), for which he could not explain the sources. The Supreme People's Court of China reviewed the case and approved the sentencing.

Duan Yihe and Chen Zhi were both executed in Jinan on September 5, 2007. Duan was 61 years old. The method of execution was not released. He was the sixth provincial-ministerial level government official to be executed in China since 1978, after Hu Changqing (vice governor of Jiangxi), Cheng Kejie, Wang Huaizhong (vice governor of Anhui), Zheng Xiaoyu, and Lü Debin (vice governor of Henan).

== See also ==
- Zhao Liping, Inner Mongolia politician executed for murder in 2017
- Cheng Kejie, another politician executed for corruption
