= Ji (state in modern Shandong) =

Historic fief in Shandong Province, China

State of Ji 紀國
- Unknown–690 BCE
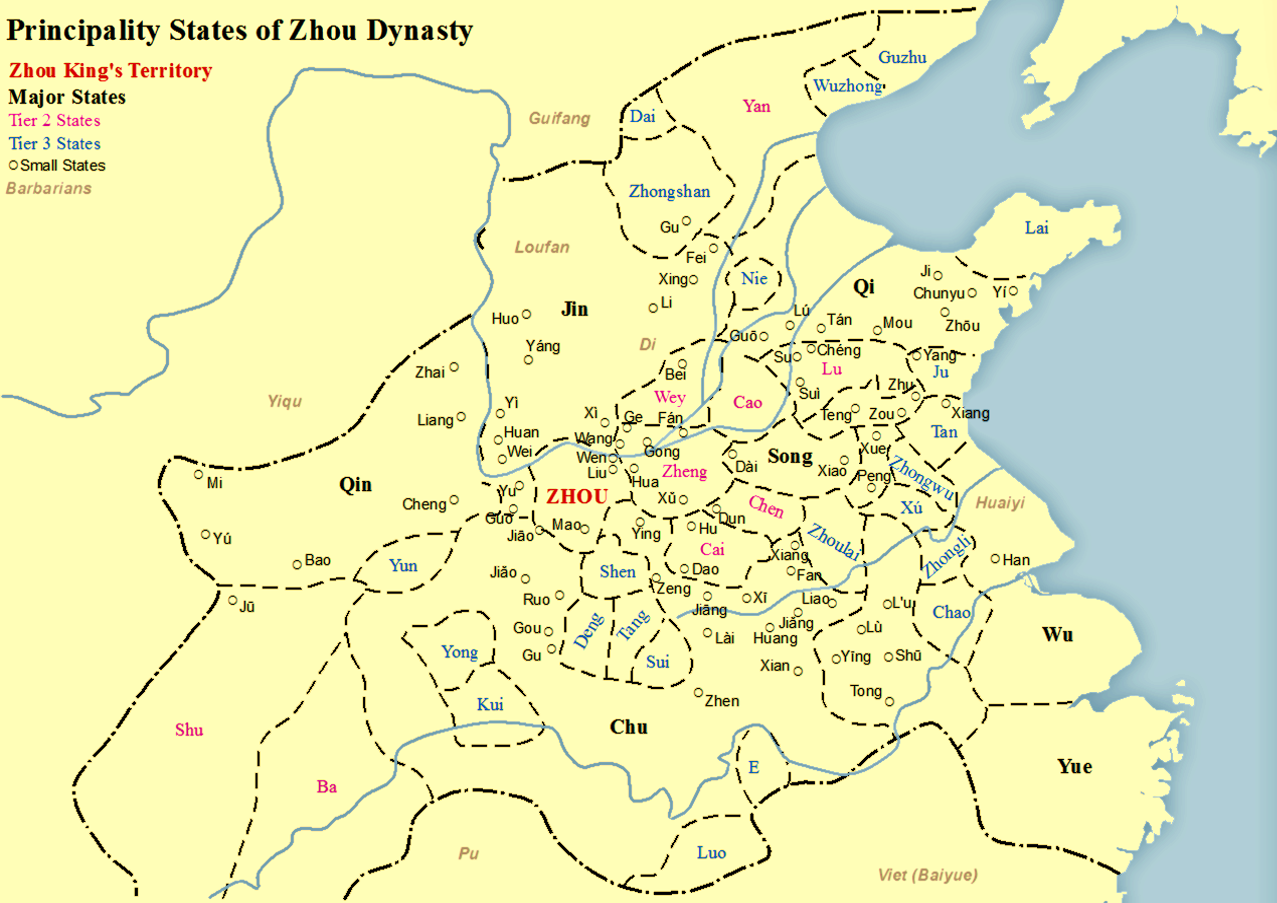
- Map showing states of the Zhou dynasty (Ji is located west of Lai)
- Capital: Shouguang, Shandong
- Government: Monarchy
- Historical era: Western Zhou and the Spring and Autumn period
  - Established: Unknown
  - Invaded/annexed by Qi: 690 BCE
- Today part of: China

Ji (Chinese: 紀國) was a fief that ruled over the mid-northern part of today's Shandong Province in China from the Western Zhou dynasty to the Spring and Autumn period. The state was ruled by the members of the ancient Jiang family. The capital of the state is the ancient city of Ji. Bronze tools of the Ji people had been found in places such as Shouguang, Laiyang, and Yantai. Ji was located east of Qi and the southwest of Lai.

== History ==
In the 9th century BC, the marquis of Ji (紀) had a dispute with Duke Ai of Qi. King Yi of Zhou sided with Marquis of Ji and executed Duke Ai by boiling him to death. King Yi installed Duke Ai's younger half-brother Jing on the throne, later known as Duke Hu of Qi. After the incident, Ji formed an alliance with Lu. In 699 BCE, the armies of Lu, Ji, and Zheng defeated the armies of Qi, Song, Wei, and Southern Yan. The battle resulted in the dismantling of Qi hegemony, but also led to rising tensions between Ji and Qi. Duke Huan of Lu tried to end the hostilities between Ji and Qi in 695 BCE, but Duke Xiang of Qi ordered the Qi Army to invade Ji in 693 BCE. After Duke Huan of Lu and a Zheng prince was murdered by Duke Xiang of Qi, Ji's allies Lu and Zheng lost the ability to assist Ji in defending a Qi invasion. The capital city of Ji was occupied by Qi forces in 690 BCE after the ruler of Ji surrendered the city to the Qi monarch.

== See also ==
- List of states during the Spring and Autumn period
