= Duchess Mu of Xu =

7th-century BC Chinese princess, politician and poet

Duchess Mu of Xu (Chinese: 許穆夫人; pinyin: Xǔ Mù Fūrén; fl. 7th century BC) was a princess of the State of Wey who married Duke Mu of Xu (許穆公; Xu Mu Gong), the ruler of the State of Xǔ. She was the first recorded female poet in Chinese history.

== Life ==
A princess of the Wey state with the clan name Ji, she was the daughter of Wan, Count Zhao of Wey (son of Duke Xuan of Wey) and his wife Xuan Jiang, a daughter of Duke Xi of Qi. Xuan Jiang was the sister of Wen Jiang, and the two sisters were renowned beauties. She married Duke Mu of Xu and became known as the Duchess of Xu.

When Wey was invaded in 660 BC by the Northern Di barbarians, she tried to return to her home state and call for help from other states on the way. However, courtiers from Xu caught up with her and forced her to return to Xu. Nevertheless, her appeals for aid succeeded, and the state of Qi saved Wey from its crisis. The Wey people remembered her for bringing supplies, getting military aid and rebuilding the state.

According to Zuo Zhuan, she composed the poem "Speeding Chariot" (載馳; Zaichi) expressing her profound anxiety about her native state of Wey being destroyed by the Di. The poem is collected in the Classic of Poetry. Two other poems in the collection, "Bamboo Pole" (竹竿) and "Spring Water" (泉水), have also been attributed to her, although it is not certain if all three poems were actually written by her.

== Works ==
=== Speeding chariot (載馳) ===
载驰载驱，归唁卫侯。

驱马悠悠，言至于漕。

大夫跋涉，我心则忧。

既不我嘉，不能旋反。

视尔不臧，我思不远。

既不我嘉，不能旋济。

视尔不臧，我思不閟。

陟彼阿丘，言采其虻。

女子善怀，亦各有行。

许人尤之，众穉且狂。

我行其野，芃芃其麦。

控于大邦，谁因谁极。

大夫君子，无我有尤。

百尔所思，不如我所之。

English translation

Go fast chariots! I am going back to where the ruler of Wei lives to console him.

The horse keeps wandering, and when will i reach Zhao?

The daifus (high officials) went wandering, but my heart is filled with worries.

There is no person that thinks I am good, yet I cannot go back.

That person doesn’t think very much of me, but my thoughts haven't changed.

You do not think of me as good, but my thoughts for you would not cease.

I will climb up those hills and collect plants (to make medicine to cure my worries).

A woman has lot of thoughts, and they all go their own ways.

The people of Xu worry about me yet they are childish and mad!

I went out in the wilderness and noticed the wheat not reaped (because of the political situation).

I should try to report it, yet who should I tell it to?

To all the high officials, do not say I worry.

I have so many thoughts but it is not anything compared to where I am trying to go.

== Sources ==
- "Lady Xu Mu – poet and patriot"
