= Battle of Xuge =

707 BC battle in Henan Province, China

- Part of the Spring and Autumn period
Date	707 BC
Location	Xuge (modern day Changge, Henan Province)
Result	Zheng victory

Belligerents
Zheng	Eastern Zhou; Chen; Cai; Wey

Commanders and leaders
Duke Zhuang of Zheng	King Huan of Zhou (WIA)

The Battle of Xuge (Chinese: 繻葛之戰) took place in 707 BC, when the Eastern Zhou dynasty invaded its vassal the neighboring Zheng state. The defeat of the Eastern Zhou forces, representing the Son of Heaven, destroyed any residual prestige that the Zhou court had since establishing itself in Luoyang, and allowed for the rise of the feudal states that would characterise the Spring and Autumn period.

This battle is an early example of a pincer movement being employed against an enemy.

== Background ==
After its eastward flight from Chengzhou (modern-day Xi'an) to Luoyi (modern-day Luoyang), the Zhou kings retained some of their prestige but no longer had the power to assert its will over the regional vassal lords.

The state of Zheng had been one of the key protectors of the Zhou court in Luoyang, moving its capital eastwards as well to Xinzheng (modern-day Zhengzhou) and serving as a buffer state to the east. During the rule of Duke Zhuang, Zheng grew strong and began to assert its independence, allying with Lu and Qi and conquering other small vassals in the Central Plains.

Since Zheng was in close proximity to the Zhou court, these actions increased tension between the two powers. Despite being the nominal overlord, King Ping of Zhou exchanged hostages with Duke Zhuang in an attempt to secure peace, but this only led to increased mistrust. When King Huan succeeded to the throne, he then removed Duke Zhuang from the post of court minister (卿士). In retaliation, Duke Zhuang refused to pay tribute to the Zhou court.

== Battle ==
In 707 BC, King Huan finally determined to lead a punitive expedition against Zheng. The Zhou court had weakened to the extent that it required a coalition to produce the required army, gathering several other Central Plains feudal states against their common enemy. He took personal command of the central; the troops of Cai and Wey occupied the right wing, while the troops of Chen occupied the left wing.

Duke Zhuang led the defense of Zheng. His advisor, Ziyuan, offered the analysis that the troops of Chen were in disarray due to civil war, while the troops of Cai and Wey had been defeated by Zheng before and feared them; he therefore suggested attacking the wings first, before enveloping the Zhou centre. Duke Zhuang took this advice, and the plan succeeded; the allied troops were quickly routed on the wings, and the Zhou army was destroyed by a pincer attack, with King Huan being shot by an arrow in the shoulder.

== Aftermath ==
The wounding of the Son of Heaven, and the failure of a royal expedition, destroyed any remaining prestige the Zhou court once had over its vassals. The Battle of Xuge confirmed the de facto independence of the feudal states and laid the foundation for the struggles towards hegemony. The Zhou were so impoverished by the defeat that, after the death of King Huan in 697 BC, it took ten years to get the funds required to hold a fitting royal funeral.

The ascendancy of the State of Zheng did not last for long. Duke Zhuang died in 701 BC, and his sons fought a two-decade civil war over the throne, weakening the state permanently.
