= Yanling =

Yanling may refer to several places in China:

- Yanling County (Han) (延陵縣), in Dai Commandery under the Han dynasty
- Yanling County, Henan (鄢陵县), of Xuchang, Henan
- Yanling County, Hunan (炎陵县), of Zhuzhou, Hunan
- Yanling, Danyang, Jiangsu (延陵镇), a town in Danyang City, Jiangsu
