= Duke Xi of Qi =

Duke of Qi from 730 to 698 BC

Duke Xi of Qi 齊僖公

Duke of Qi
- Reign: 730–698 BC
- Predecessor: Duke Zhuang I
- Successor: Duke Xiang
- Died: 698 BC
- Spouse: Wey Ji
- Issue: Duke Xiang; Jiu (纠); Duke Huan; Xuan Jiang; Wen Jiang
Names
- Ancestral name: Jiāng (姜); Clan name: Lǚ (呂); Given name: Lùfǔ (祿甫)
Posthumous name
- Duke Xi (僖公 or 釐公)
- House: Jiang
- Dynasty: Jiang Qi
- Father: Duke Zhuang I

Duke Xi of Qi (Chinese: 齊僖公; pinyin: Qí Xī Gōng), personal name Lü Lufu, was the 13th ruler of the Jiang Qi state from 730 BC until his death in 698 BC.

== Reign ==
Duke Xi succeeded his father Duke Zhuang I of Qi, who died in 731 BC after a reign of 64 years, as ruler of Qi. In 706 BC, Qi was attacked by the Northern Rong tribes (also called Mountain Rong). Duke Zhuang of the State of Zheng sent Crown Prince Hu (later Duke Zhao of Zheng) to help Qi repel the Northern Rong.

== Succession ==
Duke Xi reigned for 33 years and died in 698 BC. He was succeeded by his son, Duke Xiang of Qi, who would later be murdered by Duke Xi's nephew Wuzhi. Wuzhi himself was also killed soon afterward, and Duke Xi's younger son Xiaobai ascended the throne, posthumously known as Duke Huan of Qi. Qi grew strong under Duke Huan's rule and he became the first of the Five Hegemons of the Spring and Autumn period.

== Family ==
Wives:

- Wey Ji, of the Ji clan of Wey (衛姬 姬姓), the mother of Prince Xiaobai

Concubines:

- Lady, of Lu, the mother of Prince Jiu

Sons:

- Prince Zhu'er (公子諸兒; 729–686 BC), ruled as Duke Xiang of Qi from 697 to 686 BC
- Prince Jiu (公子糾; d. 685 BC)
- Prince Xiaobai (公子小白; d. 643 BC), ruled as Duke Huan of Qi from 684 to 643 BC

Daughters:

- Xuan Jiang (宣姜)
  - Married Duke Xuan of Wey (d. 700 BC), and had issue (Viscount Shou of Wey, Duke Hui of Wey)
  - Married Count Zhao of Wey in 687 BC, and had issue (Viscount Qi of Wey, Duke Dai of Wey, Duke Wen of Wey, Song Huan (the wife of Duke Huan of Song and mother of Duke Xiang of Song), Xu Mu)
- Wen Jiang (文姜; 733–673 BC)
  - Married Duke Huan of Lu (731–694 BC) in 709 BC, and had issue (two sons including Duke Zhuang of Lu)

Duke Xi of Qi House of Jiang Died: 698 BC
Regnal titles
| Preceded by Duke Zhuang I of Qi | Duke of Qi; 730–698 BC | Succeeded by Duke Xiang of Qi |
