= Ji Ban =

Ji Ban is the personal name of:

- Ziban (died 662 BC), ruler of Lu
- King Kuang of Zhou (died 607 BC)
