= Duke Zhuang of Qi =

Duke Zhuang of Qi may refer to:

- Duke Zhuang I of Qi, reigned 794–731 BC in the state of Qi
- Duke Zhuang II of Qi, reigned 553–548 BC in the state of Qi
