= Xuan Jiang =

Chinese duchess (730–690 BC)

Xuan Jiang 宣姜
- Duchess of Wey
- Born: 730 BC
- Died: 690 BC
- Spouses: Duke Xuan of Wey; Zhaobo of Wey (衛昭伯)
- Issue: Shou (壽); Duke Hui of Wey; Qizi (齊子); Duke Dai of Wey; Duke Wen of Wey; Lady Jiang, wife of Duke Huan of Song; Lady Jiang, wife of Duke Mu of Xu
- Father: Duke Xi of Qi

Xuan Jiang (730–690 BC), was the Duchess consort of Duke Xuan of Wey (r. 718–700). She was the daughter of the Duke Xi of Qi of the Jiang clan. Her personal name is unknown, and Xuan was her posthumous title.

She married Duke Xuan of Wey and became the mother of two sons: Shou (壽) and Shuo (朔).

She was initially engaged to Crown prince Jizi (急子), son of Duke Xi with another woman named Yi Jiang (夷姜), but her future stepfather chose to marry her himself instead. She is known for arranging the murder of her stepson Jizi with the support of her younger son Shuo (朔) by hiring robbers to attack him on the road. Initially, her own older son Shou (壽) was killed in error for having disguised as his stepbrother Jizi in order to protect him, but she succeeded on her second attempt.

When Shuo, later known as Duke Hui of Wey, succeeded his father, she was convinced by her brother Duke Xiang of Qi to marry her stepson prince Wan (頑), who was also known as Zhaobo of Wey (衛昭伯). Zhaobo refused the marriage, but Qi forced him to marry her. They had five children.

== Legacy ==
She is included in the "Biographies of Pernicious and Depraved Women" (孽嬖傳) of the Biographies of Exemplary Women, a Han dynasty collection of biographies of women in ancient China up to its time.
