= Yanling County, Henan =

Yanling County 鄢陵县 Yenling
- County
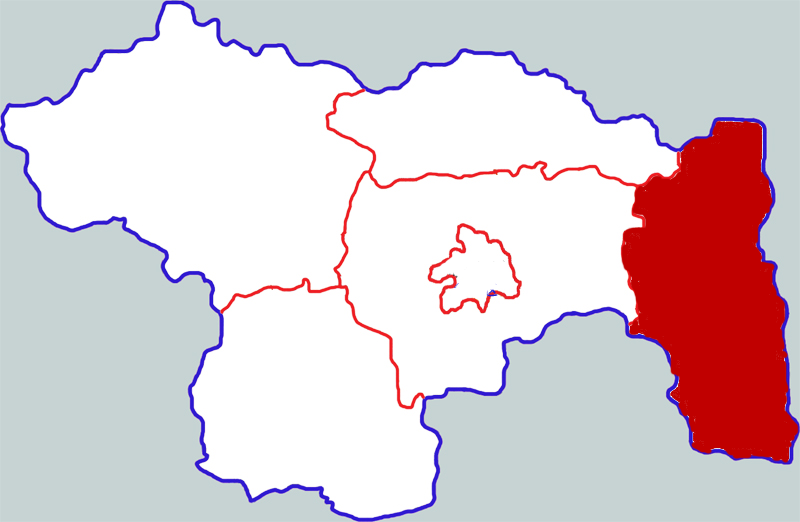
- Yanling in Xuchang

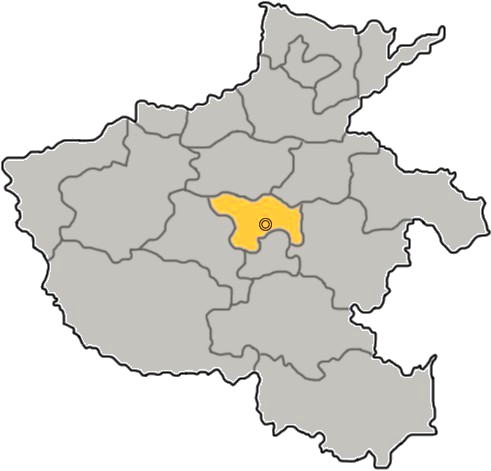
- Xuchang in Henan
- Coordinates: 34°06′07″N 114°10′37″E
- Country: People's Republic of China
- Province: Henan
- Prefecture-level city: Xuchang
- Towns: 12

Area
  - Total: 866 km^{2} (334 sq mi)

Population (2019)
  - Total: 574,100
  - Density: 663/km^{2} (1,720/sq mi)
- Time zone: UTC+8 (China Standard)
- Postal code: 461200
- Website: www.yanling.gov.cn (in Chinese)

Yanling County (simplified Chinese: 鄢陵县; traditional Chinese: 鄢陵縣; pinyin: Yānlíng Xiàn) is a county in the central part of Henan province, China. It is the easternmost county-level division of the prefecture-level city of Xuchang.

== History ==
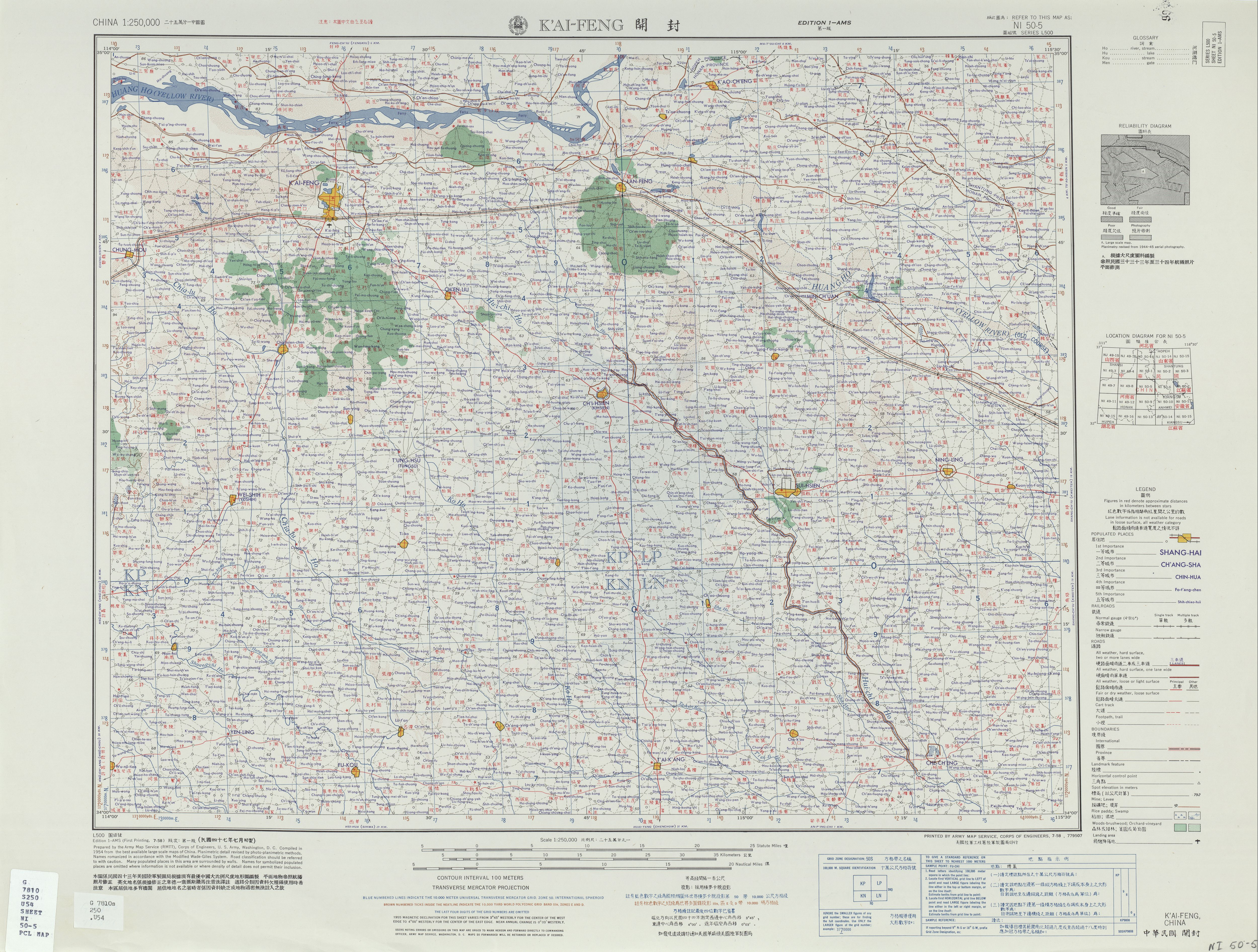
Historical map including Yanling (labeled as YEN-LING 鄢陵) and surrounding region (AMS, 1954)

Human habitation of the area began around 6000 BC.

In the early Zhou dynasty, the area became the state of Yan (鄢國).

In the Eastern Zhou dynasty, the area became known as Yan Yi (鄢邑) after the destruction of the state of Yan under Duke Wu of Zheng (鄭武公) in the early part of the reign of King Ping of Zhou (after 770 BC).

In the fifth month of 722 BC, Duke Zhuang of Zheng defeated his younger brother Gongshu Duan (共叔段) north of present-day Yanling County.

The famous Battle of Yanling (575 BC) took place in Yanling County.

Yanling County was established during the Western Han dynasty in the year 201 BC.

In 2014, six men in Yanling County were fined 2,000 yuan each for their roles in catching 1,689 wild geckos in Zhangqiao.

== Administrative divisions ==
The county is made up of twelve towns:

Town	Chinese name	Pinyin	Wade–Giles
Anling	安陵镇	Ānlíng zhèn	An-ling-chen
Malan	马栏镇	Mǎlán zhèn	Ma-lan-chen
Bailiang	柏梁镇	Bǎiliáng zhèn	Pai-liang-chen
Chenhuadian	陈化店镇	Chénhuàdiàn zhèn	Ch'en-hua-tien-chen
Wangtian	望田镇	Wàngtián zhèn	Wang-t'ien-chen
Dama	大马镇	Dàmǎ zhèn	Ta-ma-chen
Taocheng	陶城镇 (Note: Previously known as 陶城乡 (pinyin: Táochéng xiāng; Wade–Giles: T'ao-ch'eng-hsiang))	Táochéng zhèn	T'ao-ch'eng
Zhangqiao	张桥镇 (Note: Previously known as 张桥乡 (pinyin: Zhāngqiáo xiāng; Wade–Giles: Chang-ch'iao-hsiang))	Zhāngqiáo zhèn	Chang-ch'iao-chen
Pengdian	彭店镇 (Note: Previously known as 彭店乡 (pinyin: Péngdiàn xiāng; Wade–Giles: P'eng-tien-hsiang))	Péngdiàn zhèn	P'eng-tien-chen
Zhile	只乐镇 (Note: Previously known as 只乐乡 (pinyin: Zhĭlè xiāng; Wade–Giles: Chih-le-hsiang))	Zhĭlè zhèn	Chih-le-chen
Nanwu	南坞镇 (Note: Previously known as 南坞乡 (pinyin: Nánwù xiāng; Wade–Giles: Nan-wu-hsiang))	Nánwù zhèn	Nan-wu-chen
Mafang	马坊镇 (Note: Previously known as 马坊乡 (pinyin: Măfăng xiāng; Wade–Giles: Ma-fang-hsiang))	Măfăng zhèn	Ma-fang-chen

== Climate ==
Climate data for Yanling, elevation 61 m (200 ft), (1991–2020 normals, extremes 1981–2010)
Month	Jan	Feb	Mar	Apr	May	Jun	Jul	Aug	Sep	Oct	Nov	Dec	Year
Record high °C (°F)	18.8 (65.8)	23.7 (74.7)	29.3 (84.7)	32.8 (91.0)	38.7 (101.7)	40.5 (104.9)	40.7 (105.3)	37.6 (99.7)	36.3 (97.3)	35.6 (96.1)	27.8 (82.0)	20.5 (68.9)	40.7 (105.3)
Mean daily maximum °C (°F)	6.0 (42.8)	9.8 (49.6)	15.4 (59.7)	21.7 (71.1)	27.2 (81.0)	32.0 (89.6)	32.2 (90.0)	30.7 (87.3)	27.0 (80.6)	22.1 (71.8)	14.5 (58.1)	8.1 (46.6)	20.6 (69.0)
Daily mean °C (°F)	0.5 (32.9)	3.9 (39.0)	9.3 (48.7)	15.4 (59.7)	21.0 (69.8)	25.7 (78.3)	27.3 (81.1)	25.8 (78.4)	21.2 (70.2)	15.5 (59.9)	8.4 (47.1)	2.4 (36.3)	14.7 (58.5)
Mean daily minimum °C (°F)	−3.8 (25.2)	−0.8 (30.6)	4.0 (39.2)	9.6 (49.3)	15.3 (59.5)	20.3 (68.5)	23.3 (73.9)	22.1 (71.8)	16.8 (62.2)	10.5 (50.9)	3.5 (38.3)	−1.9 (28.6)	9.9 (49.8)
Record low °C (°F)	−17.7 (0.1)	−17.9 (−0.2)	−8.4 (16.9)	−1.9 (28.6)	2.2 (36.0)	11.1 (52.0)	16.8 (62.2)	12.1 (53.8)	6.4 (43.5)	−1.6 (29.1)	−16.4 (2.5)	−15.4 (4.3)	−17.9 (−0.2)
Average precipitation mm (inches)	12.7 (0.50)	16.4 (0.65)	27.2 (1.07)	41.4 (1.63)	65.8 (2.59)	89.0 (3.50)	172.2 (6.78)	134.5 (5.30)	82.1 (3.23)	42.7 (1.68)	33.0 (1.30)	12.6 (0.50)	729.6 (28.73)
Average precipitation days (≥ 0.1 mm)	4.3	5.1	5.6	6.0	7.8	7.7	11.3	11.0	8.7	6.5	6.1	3.8	83.9
Average snowy days	3.6	3.1	1.2	0.1	0	0	0	0	0	0	1.1	2.3	11.4
Average relative humidity (%)	67	66	66	70	70	68	81	85	80	74	72	68	72
Mean monthly sunshine hours	121.8	132.1	171.3	199.8	212.0	195.8	188.2	173.2	157.7	149.2	134.7	127.6	1,963.4
Percentage possible sunshine	39	42	46	51	49	45	43	42	43	43	44	42	44
Source: China Meteorological Administration

== Economy ==
The county's primary agricultural products include wheat, beans, sweet potatoes, cotton and tobacco among others. The county is known for growing flowers which began during the Tang dynasty and flourished during the Song dynasty. The county is therefore known as 'Flower County' (花县, or also 花都 and 花乡). Industries in the county include machinery manufacturing, fertilizer, concrete and wine making among others.

In 2017, the value of the county's output in the flower and plant industry reached 7.1 billion yuan (1.03 billion U.S. dollars).

== Demographics ==
Historical population
Year	Pop.	±% p.a.
2000	564,477	—
2010	551,611	−0.23%

The population of the county decreased between the 2000 census and 2010 census.

== Transportation ==
- China National Highway 311

== People from Yanling County ==
- Lü Debin (1953–2005), executed politician
