= Duke Huan of Wey =

Ruler of Wey from 734 to 719 BC

Duke Huan of Wey 衛桓公

Ruler of Wey
- Reign: 734 - 719 BC
- Predecessor: Duke Zhuang I of Wey
- Successor: Zhouyu
- Died: 719 BC
Names
- Ancestral name: Ji (姬); Given name: He (完)
- House: House of Ji
- Father: Duke Zhuang I of Wey
- Mother: Dai Gui

Duke Huan of Wey (Chinese: 衛桓公; pinyin: Wèi Huán Gōng, died 719 BC), personal name Ji Wan (姬完), was the 13th ruler of the state of Wey during the Spring and Autumn period of Chinese history.

== Background ==
Prince Wan was born to Duke Zhuang I of Wey and his concubine Dai Gui. Dai Gui's elder sister, Li Gui, was also one of his concubines; she had given birth to Count Xiao (孝伯), who had died young. After Dai Gui died, Duke Zhuang had Zhuang Jiang, his principal wife who had no children, raise Prince Wan. It was then that Duke Zhuang made Prince Wan the crown prince.

== Accession and Reign ==
Prince Wan succeeded his father upon his death in 735 BC and would become known as Duke Huan of Wey.

In 733 BC, Duke Huan dismissed his younger brother Zhouyu from all his posts on account of his arrogance and extravagance. Zhouyu, who was greatly favoured by his father Duke Zhuang, went into exile.

In 722 BC, Duke Huan went to Lu to attend the funeral of Duke Hui of Lu. In the same year, Gongshu Duan, younger brother of Duke Zhuang of Zheng, rebelled against him, but he was defeated and forced into exile. Prince Hua (滑), a son of Gongshu Duan, fled to Wey. Duke Huan, on behalf of Prince Hua, attacked Zheng, occupying the Zheng settlement of Linyan (廪延). Duke Zhuang of Zheng then launched counter-attacks against Wey.

== Death and Succession ==
In 719 BC, Zhouyu gathered his fellow Wey exiles and murdered Duke Huan. This was the first known case of regicide in the Spring and Autumn period. Zhouyu then seized the throne for himself. Less than a year later, he was arrested in the neighbouring state of Chen in a plot led by Wey Minister Shi Que, sent back to Wey, and executed. Wey officials then invited Prince Jin (晉), Duke Huan and Zhouyu's younger brother who was then a political hostage in the neighbouring state of Xing, to return to Wey to take the throne. Prince Jin would become known as Duke Xuan of Wey.

== Bibliography ==
- Zuo Zhuan, Duke Yin
- Shiji, vol. 14, 37
- Durrant, Stephen; Li, Wai-yee; Schaberg, David (2016). Zuo Tradition/Zuozhuan: Commentary on the "Spring and Autumn Annals" (1st ed.). Seattle: University of Washington Press. ISBN 978-0-295-99915-9.
