= Wuzhi =

Wuzhi may refer to:

- Wuzhi County, in Henan, China
- Wuzhi Mountain, in Hainan, China
- Wuzhi (Qi), ruler of the state of Qi in 685 BC
