= King Zhuang =

King Zhuang may refer to these monarchs from China's Spring and Autumn period:

- King Zhuang of Zhou (died 682 BC)
- King Zhuang of Chu (died 591 BC)

== See also ==
- Duke Zhuang (disambiguation)
