= Duke Huan of Lu =

Ruler of Chinese state of Lu from 711 to 694 BC

Duke Huan of Lu 魯桓公
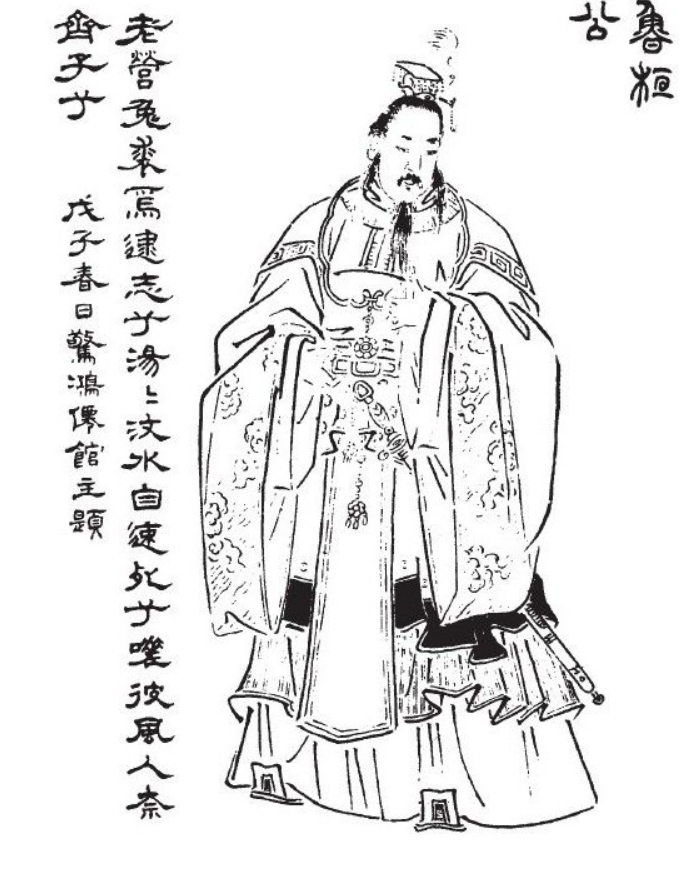

Ruler of Lu
- Reign: 711–14 April 694 BC
- Predecessor: Duke Yin of Lu
- Successor: Duke Zhuang of Lu
- Died: 14 April 694 BC
- Spouse: Wen Jiang (daughter of Duke Xi of Qi)
- Issue: Duke Zhuang of Lu; Qingfu (慶父); Shu Ya (叔牙); Ji You (季友)
Names
- Ancestral name: Ji (姬); Given name: Yun (允) or Gui (軌)
Posthumous name
- Duke Huan (桓公)
- House: Ji
- Dynasty: Lu
- Father: Duke Hui of Lu
- Mother: Zhong Zi (仲子, daughter of Duke Wu of Song)

Duke Huan of Lu (Chinese: 魯桓公; pinyin: Lǔ Huán Gōng, died 14 April 694 BC), personal name Ji Yun or Ji Gui, was a ruler of the Lu state, reigning from 711 to 694 BC.

== Early life ==
Duke Huan was the son of Duke Hui of Lu and his main wife Zhong Zi (仲子), daughter of Duke Wu of the State of Song. Duke Hui also had another son, Xigu (later Duke Yin of Lu), whose mother was a concubine. Although Xigu was the older son, Duke Huan was made the crown prince owing to the higher status of his mother.

== Accession to the throne ==
In 723 BC Duke Hui died after 46 years of reign. Although Duke Huan was the crown prince, he was then a little boy and his older half-brother Duke Yin ascended the throne with the understanding that he would rule as a regent until Duke Huan grew up.

In 712 BC, Duke Yin's brother Prince Hui suggested that Duke Yin kill Duke Huan and permanently take the throne, but Duke Yin refused. Afraid that he would be killed if the word leaked out, Prince Hui went to Duke Huan and falsely accused Duke Yin of planning to kill him, offering to kill Duke Yin first. Duke Huan agreed. In the eleventh month of that year Prince Hui had Duke Yin assassinated when he was making sacrificial offerings, and Duke Huan ascended the throne as planned.

== Reign ==
In 709 BC, Duke Huan married Wen Jiang, daughter of Duke Xi of Qi, one of the most powerful states during the Spring and Autumn period. Three years later, Wen Jiang gave birth to a boy. The boy had the same birthday as his father, therefore he was given the name Tong, meaning "the same". Tong was made Crown Prince of Lu.

In 696 BC, the State of Zheng was in turmoil. After trying unsuccessfully to kill the powerful minister Zhai Zhong, Duke Li of Zheng fled and Zhai installed Duke Li's half-brother Duke Zhao of Zheng on the throne. Duke Huan of Lu and Duke Zhuang of Song attacked Zheng in an attempt to restore Duke Li, but were defeated.

== Death and succession ==
In 698 BC Wen Jiang's father Duke Xi of Qi died and was succeeded by his son Duke Xiang of Qi. Before her marriage to Duke Huan of Lu, Wen Jiang and her older half-brother Duke Xiang had had an incestuous relationship.

In 694 BC, the eighteenth year of his reign, Duke Huan visited the State of Qi with his wife, and Duke Xiang and Wen Jiang renewed their sexual liaison. When Duke Huan found out about their relationship, Duke Xiang ordered his half brother Prince Pengsheng to murder Duke Huan when he was drunk.

The people of Lu were incensed at Duke Xiang's crime, but could not do anything because Qi was a stronger state. To appease Lu, Duke Xiang had Pengsheng executed as a scapegoat. Crown Prince Tong, the son of Duke Huan and Wen Jiang, subsequently succeeded his father as ruler of Lu, to be known as Duke Zhuang of Lu.

== Other children ==
Besides Duke Zhuang, Duke Huan and Wen Jiang had two other sons named Shu Ya (叔牙) and Ji You (季友). Duke Huan also had an older son named Qingfu (慶父) with a concubine. Qingfu, Shu Ya, and Ji You were founders of three powerful clans that later controlled the power of Lu. Together they were called the Three Huan for all being descendants of Duke Huan. Ji You's lineage, called Jisun or Ji, eventually formed the splinter state of Fei.

Duke Huan of Lu was the ancestor of Mencius through Qingfu. He was descended from Duke Yang of Lu, who was the son of Bo Qin, who was the son of the Duke of Zhou of the Zhou dynasty royal family. The genealogy is found in the Mencius family tree (孟子世家大宗世系).

Duke Huan of Lu House of Ji Cadet branch of the House of Ji Died: 694 BC
Regnal titles
Preceded by Duke Yin of Lu	Duke of Lu; 711–694 BC	Succeeded by Duke Zhuang of Lu
