= Duke Huan of Zheng =

Duke of Zheng from 806 to 771 BC

Duke Huan of Zheng 鄭桓公

Duke of Zheng
- Reign: 806–771 BC
- Predecessor: none
- Successor: Duke Wu of Zheng
- Died: 771 BC
Names
- Ancestral name: Ji (姬); Given name: You (友)
Posthumous name
- Duke Huan (桓公)
- House: Ji
- Dynasty: Zheng
- Father: King Li of Zhou

Duke Huan of Zheng (simplified Chinese: 郑桓公; traditional Chinese: 鄭桓公; pinyin: Zhèng Huán Gōng), personal name Ji You, was the founding duke of the Zheng state, a dynastic vassal state of the Zhou dynasty. According to the Records of the Grand Historian, he was a son of King Li of Zhou.

In 806 BC, he was bestowed the land of Zheng (northwest of modern Hua County, Shaanxi) by King Xuan of Zhou. In 773 BC, the 33rd year of the reign of Duan Huan of Zheng, King You of Zhou accorded him the position of situ (Minister of Land) due to the people's love for him.

== State relocation ==
Due to the instability during the rule of King You of Zhou, Duke Huan of Zheng consulted Taishi Bo (太史伯) on his opinions on state relocation. Duke Huan expressed that he wished to move the country to the west or to the Yangtze River Basin. Taishi Bo indicated that establishing a country in the west would not last long since the people of the west were avaricious and greedy, and that establishing a country in the Yangtze River Basin would be unfavourable for the country since the state of Chu was expanding in the south. In the end, Duke Huan listened to the advice of Taishi Bo and moved the country to the east of Luoyang, south of the Yellow River and the Ji River (濟水), and named it New Zheng (新鄭).

After relocating the country, other nearby states such as the state of Kuai (鄶) and Guo offered Duke Huan ten cities, which were incorporated into the land of his country.

== Death ==
In 771 BC, the 45th of his reign, the Quanrong attacked the Zhou capital Haojing and killed both King You of Zhou and Duke Huan of Zheng. His son, Juetu (掘突) assumed the throne as Duke Wu of Zheng.

== See also ==
1. Family tree of ancient Chinese emperors

Duke Huan of Zheng House of Ji Cadet branch of the House of Ji
Chinese nobility
New creation	Duke of Zheng; 806–771 BC	Succeeded by Duke Wu of Zheng
