= Zhao Liping =

Chinese police chief and politician

- 赵黎平

Vice-Chairman of the Chinese People's Political Consultative Conference Inner Mongolia Committee
- In office February 2012 – January 2013
- Preceded by: Xiao Lisheng (肖黎声)
- Succeeded by: Guo Qijun (郭启俊)

Vice-Chairman of the Inner Mongolia Autonomous Region People's Government
- In office May 2010 – July 2012
- Succeeded by: Ma Ming (马明)

Director of the Inner Mongolia Autonomous Region Public Security Department
- In office March 2005 – July 2012
- Preceded by: Zhu Guangkai (祝广垲)
- Succeeded by: Ma Ming

Personal details
- Born: August 1951 Yutian County, Hebei, China
- Died: May 26, 2017 (aged 65) Taiyuan, Shanxi
- Party: Chinese Communist Party (1976–2015, expelled)
- Education: Inner Mongolia Radio & TV University; Chinese People's Public Security University; Central Party School of the Chinese Communist Party; PLA National Defense University
- Occupation: Politician, writer

Zhao Liping (simplified Chinese: 赵黎平; traditional Chinese: 趙黎平; pinyin: Zhào Lípíng; August 1951 – 26 May 2017) was a Chinese police chief and politician who spent most of his career in Inner Mongolia. He served successively as the head of the region's Public Security Department, Vice-chairman of the Inner Mongolia Autonomous Region, and vice-chairman of the regional political advisory body. Zhao was also a writer. He was arrested by police in the eastern Inner Mongolian city of Chifeng in March 2015 on charges of intentional homicide. He was the first known provincial-level official to be convicted of murder in the history of the People's Republic of China. He was executed in 2017.

== Life and career ==
Zhao was born and raised in Yutian County, Hebei. Zhao entered Inner Mongolia Radio & TV University in September 1982, majoring in Chinese language, where he graduated in October 1985. He went down to the countryside in Jilin province, before taking on a job as a worker at a printing factory. He also studied at Chinese People's Public Security University, Central Party School of the Chinese Communist Party (CCP), and People's Liberation Army National Defence University as a part-time student.

During the Cultural Revolution, he was a sent-down youth performing manual labor in Horqin Left Middle Banner, Jilin province.

He worked for the police force and over 40 years worked his way up to head the Public Security Department of Inner Mongolia, essentially the region's police chief. During his term as police chief, he instituted programs to speed up response times to emergency calls, and vowed to shorten wait times to "30 seconds within the city, one minute in the suburbs, and as fast a possible in the rural regions."

As regional police chief, Zhao also concurrently became Vice-chairman of Inner Mongolia Government in May 2010, and was re-elected in February 2012.

In July 2012 he was appointed the vice-chairman of the Inner Mongolia Autonomous Region Committee of the Chinese People's Political Consultative Conference, a mostly ceremonial position he held until January 2013, when he retired. When he departed his position as regional police chief, he was given a standing ovation from his police colleagues that lasted several minutes.

Zhao also had a moderately successful career as a writer, authoring lengthy novels, poems, and award-winning screenplays. He penned works in a wide range of topics, from murder mysteries to his recollections of trips to Hong Kong and Russia. His profile was featured on the China Writers Association; he has been a member of the association since 2007.

== Murder investigation ==
On March 20, 2015, at approximately 9:30 pm in the city of Chifeng, Zhao was driving a black Audi sedan with Ordos license plates pursuing a white vehicle with a woman inside. The woman, surnamed Li, was born in 1988 and was 27 years old at the time of the incident, and reportedly had "intimate relations" with Zhao. The woman had called the emergency police number 110 that day, saying "Zhao Liping is out to kill me," before hanging up abruptly. Zhao was said to have caught up with the woman inside the Baihe Xincheng (百合新城) residential neighbourhood of Chifeng and shot the woman in the head, killing her, then put her corpse in the trunk of his car. Zhao then allegedly proceeded to a local garbage dump where he attempted to bury her body amid mounds of rubbish. It was said that ten hours earlier, Zhao had visited the dump, ostensibly to plan for the murder. It was unclear how Zhao obtained a gun, as it was illegal for retired police officers to carry firearms.

In the early morning of March 21, Zhao was detained by police in Heshigten Banner. On March 22, Zhao was arrested on suspicion of murder. Zhao did not resist arrest and reportedly still carried blood stains at the time of his arrest. Zhao was the 100th high-ranking "tiger" (officials of sub-provincial level and above) being investigated or charged with a crime since the anti-corruption campaign in China began in 2012, though initially he was not being investigated for corruption, the Central Commission for Discipline Inspection (CCDI) took up his case as a separate investigation from the murder charge.

A former subordinate of Zhao said about his crimes, "he was a great guy, not arrogant at all. He was calm, truthful, self-assured. It perplexes me what made him do such a stupid thing."

== Conviction and execution ==
On July 31, 2015, upon the completion of the investigation by the CCDI, Zhao Liping was expelled from the Communist Party. The investigation concluded that Zhao used the conveniences of his office to aid in the promotion and business activities of associates, and "illegally possessed bullets and guns", "severely violated socialist morality by engaging in adultery", and took bribes.

Zhao pleaded not guilty. On November 11, 2016, Zhao was convicted on charges of intentional homicide, taking bribes, abuse of power, and illegal possession of firearms, and sentenced by the Taiyuan Intermediate People's Court to death. Zhao appealed the decision. The Shanxi People's High Court rejected the appeal and upheld the sentence, which was reviewed by the Supreme People's Court. Zhao was the first official of sub-provincial level or above to be sentenced to death since Xi Jinping took power of the CCP general secretary in 2012. He was executed on May 26, 2017.

== See also ==
- Duan Yihe, Shandong politician executed for murder in 2007
- Lü Debin, Henan politician executed for murder in 2005

Government offices
| Previous: Zhu Guangkai (祝广垲) | Director of the Inner Mongolia Autonomous Region Public Security Department; 2005–2012 | Next: Ma Ming (马明) |
