= Duke Min of Lu =

Duke Min of Lu 魯閔公

Ruler of Lu
- Reign: 661–660 BC
- Predecessor: Ziban
- Successor: Duke Xi of Lu
- Died: 660 BC
Names
- Ancestral name: Ji (姬); Given name: Qi (啟)
Posthumous name
- Duke Min (閔公)
- House: Ji
- Dynasty: Lu
- Father: Duke Zhuang of Lu
- Mother: Shu Jiang (叔姜)

Duke Min of Lu (Chinese: 魯閔公; pinyin: Lǔ Mǐn Gōng; died 7 September 660 BC), personal name Ji Qi, (Note: Some sources recorded his name as Qifang (啟方). Sima Qian, the author of Records of the Grand Historian, used the name Kai (開) due to the naming taboo of the Emperor Jing of Han, whose personal name was also Qi (啟).) was a duke of the Lu state. He ruled from 661 BC to 660 BC.

Duke Min was a son of the Duke Zhuang of Lu and Shu Jiang (叔姜), one of Duke Zhuang's concubines and a sister of Ai Jiang (哀姜), Duke Zhuang's wife. He was installed by Prince Qingfu (慶父), who murdered Ziban, Duke Zhuang's son, only two months after Duke Zhuang's death and Ziban's succession. Duke Min was a grandnephew of the Duke Huan of Qi, one of the hegemons of the Spring and Autumn period, as Duke Xiang of Qi, Shu Jiang's father, is one of Duke Huan's brothers. Zuo Zhuan suggests that the Qi state helped to install Duke Min due to this relationship.

Two years into his reign, Duke Min was murdered by a man named Bu Yi (卜齮), whose land had been appropriated by Duke Min's tutor, at the gate of the Lu palace on the command of Prince Qingfu, who had long sought the Lu throne. Prince You (友), a brother of Prince Qingfu and Duke Zhuang, who sought refuge in the Chen state after the murder of Ziban, fled to the nearby Zhu state, having had forced Prince Ya (牙), another brother, to kill himself after he voiced support for Prince Qingfu's succession of Duke Zhuang. He brought Prince Shen (申), another son of Duke Zhuang, with him.

The people of Lu, angered by Prince Qingfu's repeated regicide, forced him out of Lu. Prince Qingfu then sought refuge in the nearby state of Ju. It was after this that Prince You returned to Lu with Prince Shen (Duke Xi of Lu) and installed the latter to the Lu throne.

== Bibliography ==
- Zuo Zhuan, Duke Zhaung, Duke Min
- Gongyang Zhuan, Duke Zhuang, Duke Min
- Shiji, vol. 33
- Durrant, Stephen; Li, Wai-yee; Schaberg, David (2016). Zuo Tradition/Zuozhuan: Commentary on the "Spring and Autumn Annals" (1st ed.). Seattle: University of Washington Press. ISBN 978-0-295-99915-9
- Miller, Harry (2015). The Gongyang Commentary on The Spring and Autumn Annals. New York: Palgrave Macmillan US. doi:10.1057/9781137493002. ISBN 978-1-349-50514-2
- Blakeley, Barry B. (1977). "Functional Disparities in the Socio-Political Traditions of Spring and Autumn China: Part I: Lu and Ch'i". Journal of the Economic and Social History of the Orient. 20 (2). doi:10.2307/3631778

Duke Min of Lu House of Ji Cadet branch of the House of Ji Died: 660 BC
Regnal titles
| Preceded by Ziban | Duke of Lu; 661-660 BC | Succeeded by Duke Xi of Lu |
