= Wen Jiang =

Wen Jiang 文姜
- Duchess of Lu
- Died: 673 BC
- Spouse: Duke Huan of Lu
- Issue: Duke Zhuang of Lu; Shu Ya (叔牙); Ji You (季友)
- Father: Duke Xi of Qi

Wen Jiang (Chinese: 文姜; died 673 BC) was a princess of the State of Qi and duchess of the State of Lu during the Spring and Autumn period of ancient China. She was the daughter of Duke Xi of Qi and sister of Duke Xiang and Duke Huan of Qi. She was the main wife of Duke Huan of Lu and mother of Duke Zhuang of Lu. She is best known for having an incestuous relationship with her brother Duke Xiang, who had her husband murdered. Her clan name was Jiang (姜), her personal name is unknown, and Wen was her posthumous title.

== Marriage and childbirth ==
In 709 BC, during the reign of her father, Duke Xi of Qi, Wen Jiang married Duke Huan of Lu, who had ascended the throne of the neighbouring state of Lu in 712 BC. Three years later, Wen Jiang gave birth to a boy. The boy had the same birthday as his father; therefore, he was given the name Tong, meaning "the same," and was made the Crown Prince of Lu.

== Murder of Duke Huan of Lu ==
In 698 BC, Wen Jiang's father, Duke Xi of Qi, died and was succeeded by his son Duke Xiang of Qi. Before her marriage to Duke Huan of Lu, Wen Jiang and her older half-brother Duke Xiang had had an incestuous affair.

In 694 BC, Wen Jiang and her husband, Duke Huan, visited her home state of Qi, and Wen Jiang and Duke Xiang renewed their sexual liaison. When Duke Huan found out about their relationship, Duke Xiang ordered his half brother, Prince Pengsheng, to murder Duke Huan when he was drunk.

The people of Lu were incensed at Duke Xiang's crime, but could not do anything because Qi was a stronger state. To appease Lu, Duke Xiang had Pengsheng (zh:公子彭生) executed as a scapegoat. Crown Prince Tong, the son of Wen Jiang and Duke Huan, subsequently succeeded his father as ruler of Lu, to be known as Duke Zhuang of Lu.

== Later life ==
After the death of her husband, Wen Jiang stayed in Qi and continued the incestuous relationship with her brother, Duke Xiang. In 693 BC, Duke Xiang married a daughter of the king of Zhou, the nominal ruler of all China, but the Zhou princess died only a year later. In 686 BC Duke Xiang was murdered by his cousin Wuzhi, who usurped the Qi throne but was killed the following year. Prince Xiaobai, another brother of Wen Jiang, ascended the Qi throne, known as Duke Huan of Qi.

Wen Jiang died in the seventh month of 673 BC, during the 21st year of her son Duke Zhuang's reign.

== Other children ==
Besides Duke Zhuang, Wen Jiang and Duke Huan had two other sons named Shu Ya and Ji You. Duke Huan also had an older son named Qingfu with a concubine. Qingfu, Shu Ya, and Ji You were founders of three powerful clans that later controlled the power of Lu. Together they are called the Three Huan for all being descendants of Duke Huan. Ji You's lineage, called Jisun or Ji, eventually formed the splinter state of Fei.
