= Wang Huaizhong =

Chinese politician

Wang Huaizhong (Chinese: 王怀忠;1 August 1946 – 12 February 2004) was a Chinese politician.

From 1999 to 2004 he served as the Vice-governor of Anhui, before he was executed in 2004 for corruption.

One example of Wang's corruption is that he would get police to arrest sex workers during anti-vice campaigns, put them in hotels, and have sex with them without having to pay for it.
