= Duke Wu of Zheng =

Duke Wu of Zheng 鄭武公
- Duke of Zheng

Ruler of Zheng
- Reign: 770–744 BC
- Predecessor: Duke Huan of Zheng
- Successor: Duke Zhuang of Zheng
- Died: 744 BC
- Spouse: Wu Jiang (武姜); Gui Gui (圭媯)
- Issue: Duke Zhuang; Gongshu Duan (共叔段)
Names
- Ancestral name: Ji (姬); Given name: Juetu (掘突)
Posthumous name
- Duke Wu (武公)
- House: Ji
- Dynasty: Zheng
- Father: Duke Huan of Zheng

Duke Wu of Zheng (Chinese: 鄭武公; 770–744 BC), personal name Ji Juetu, was the second ruler of the Zheng state during the Spring and Autumn period in ancient China. He assumed the throne after his father, Duke Huan of Zheng, was killed alongside King You of Zhou in a 771 BC Quanrong attack on the Western Zhou capital Haojing. Duke Wu, alongside Duke Xiang of Qin supported King Ping of Zhou's flight to Chengzhou by securing the Central Plains, where Duke Huan had previously relocated Zheng. Duke Wu later annexed the states of Eastern Guo (東虢), Hu (胡), Kuai (鄶), and Ji (祭).

== Succession crisis ==
Despite his wife's (Wu Jiang's) requests, Duke Wu did not make his younger son, Gongshu Duan, his heir; he instead favored Wusheng, the future Duke Zhuang. Additionally, he made Duan the ruler of Jing, Zheng's capital. These factors caused Duan to rebel against Duke Zhuang after their father's death.
