= Lü Debin =

Chinese politician (1953–2005)

- 吕德彬

Vice Governor of the People's Government of Henan Province
- In office 2002–2005

Personal details
- Born: 1953
- Died: 2005 (aged 51–52)
- Party: China Democratic League

Lü Debin (Chinese: 吕德彬; May 1953 – 18 October 2005) was a Chinese politician and academic, who served as vice governor of Henan Province. In 2005, he was executed for murdering his wife. State-controlled media in China reported his wife had threatened to expose him for corruption if he divorced her. At the time, it was reported that Lü was the highest-ranking official charged with homicide since the establishment of the People's Republic of China.

Born to a poor family in Yinu Village, Dama Township, Yanling County, Henan Province, Lü became a village cadre as a teenager and was admitted to the Henan Agricultural College (now Henan Agricultural University) as a Worker-Peasant-Soldier student. He later attended Kansas State University, where he received master's and doctoral degrees.

Debin was executed by lethal injection on October 18, 2005.

== See also ==
- Zhao Liping
