= Ziban =

Ziban 子般

Ruler of Lu
- Reign: 662 BC
- Predecessor: Duke Zhuang of Lu
- Successor: Duke Min of Lu
- Died: 6 October 662 BC
Names
- Ancestral name: Ji (姬); Given name: Ban (般 or 斑)
- House: Ji
- Dynasty: Lu
- Father: Duke Zhuang of Lu
- Mother: Meng Ren (孟任)

Ziban (Chinese: 子般; pinyin: Zǐ Bān; lit. 'Son Ban'; died 6 October 662 BC), personal name Ji Ban (姬般), was a ruler of the Lu state. He is generally known in historiography as Ziban due to his reign being less than a year long, as Ziban died in the same year as his father, Duke Zhuang.

Ziban's mother was Meng Ren (孟任), a woman from the Dang (黨) family who Duke Zhuang saw from a tower he built, which overlooked the Dang residence. Duke Zhuang followed her and promised to make her his concubine. Meng Ren agreed and made a covenant with him by cutting her arm. Later, Ziban was born.

After the death of Duke Zhuang in 662 BC, Prince You (友), Duke Zhuang's brother, installed Ziban to the Lu throne.

Two months into his reign, Ziban was murdered by Qingfu (慶父), another one of Duke Zhuang's brothers. Qingfu installed Qi (Duke Min), Ziban's brother, to the Lu throne, while Prince You fled to the Chen state.

== Bibliography ==
- Zuo Zhuan, Duke Zhuang
- Shiji, vol. 33
- Dong, Zhongshu; Queen, Sarah A.; Major, John S. (2016). Luxuriant gems of the spring and autumn. Translations from the Asian classics. New York: Columbia University Press. ISBN 978-0-231-16932-5
- Durrant, Stephen; Li, Wai-yee; Schaberg, David (2016). Zuo Tradition/Zuozhuan: Commentary on the "Spring and Autumn Annals" (1st ed.). Seattle: University of Washington Press. ISBN 978-0-295-99915-9
- Miller, Harry (2015). The Gongyang Commentary on The Spring and Autumn Annals. New York: Palgrave Macmillan US. doi:10.1057/9781137493002 ISBN 978-1-349-50514-2
- Blakeley, Barry B. (1977-05). "Functional Disparities in the Socio-Political Traditions of Spring and Autumn China: Part I: Lu and Ch'i". Journal of the Economic and Social History of the Orient. 20 (2). doi:10.2307/3631778

Ziban House of Ji Cadet branch of the House of Ji Died: 662 BC
Regnal titles
Preceded by Duke Zhuang of Lu	Duke of Lu; 662 BC	Succeeded by Duke Min of Lu
