= Bao Shuya =

Chinese businessman and politician

Bao Shuya (simplified Chinese: 鲍叔牙; traditional Chinese: 鮑叔牙; pinyin: Bào Shūyá; d.644 BC) was a Chinese businessman and politician of the State of Qi under Duke Huan of Qi during the Spring and Autumn period in China. He was a contemporary and friend of Guan Zhong.

Though an able administrator in his own right, Bao is best known for his friendship with Guan, and for persuading Duke Huan of Qi to put aside personal enmities and elevate Guan Zhong to the post of Chancellor. As an official he was renowned as a judge of character and talent, with Guan Zhong himself commenting that "My parents gave birth to me, but it is Bao who knows me best."

== Life ==
Bao Shuya was a native of Yingshang, in modern-day Anhui Province, as was Guan Zhong. Bao Shuya's family was relatively wealthy, compared to Guan Zhong; nonetheless the two became fast friends from youth, and Bao admired his friend's talent. Before entering politics the two often took part in business ventures together.

=== The Princes' Rivalry ===
The two friends later entered politics as the tutors to two princes of Qi; Guan Zhong tutored Prince Jiu, while Bao Shuya tutored Prince Xiaobai (who would later become Duke Huan of Qi). The reigning duke of Qi at the time, Duke Xiang of Qi, was a dissolute ruler; foreseeing chaos and fearing for the prince's safety, Bao fled with Xiaobai to the neighbouring state of Ju. (Guan Zhong, in turn, fled with prince Jiu to the State of Lu).

Eventually Duke Xiang of Qi was killed by one of his ministers, who declared himself duke but was in turn murdered, leaving a power vacuum in Qi; this situation turned the princes, and by extension their tutors, into rivals for the throne. Bao Shuya successfully escorted Prince Xiaobai back to Qi before Prince Jiu, and the newly installed duke eventually pressured Lu into killing Prince Jiu and sending Guan Zhong back to Qi.

=== Bao Shuya's Recommendation ===
With Guan Zhong's repatriation the two friends were reunited, but the duke bore a grudge against Guan. During the journey back to Qi, Guan had attempted to assassinate the prince, loosing an arrow which hit his belt buckle; because of this the duke wanted to execute Guan. At the same time he intended to elevate Bao, his tutor and guardian, to the post of Chancellor. Bao, however, defended his friend staunchly, persuading his master first to spare Guan's life and then to elevate Guan over Bao as the Chancellor. At the same time he convinced Guan to shift his loyalty to the new duke and serve him whole-heartedly.

=== Guan Zhong's Dissuasion ===
In 645 BC, as Guan Zhong had fallen seriously ill, Duke Huan consulted him to find a successor to the Chancellorship. When Duke Huan recommended Bao Shuya, Guan Zhong spoke against it, on the grounds that Bao Shuya was too honest, upright and unyielding. Guan Zhong stated that Bao Shuya held himself to very exacting standards, but also expected others to do the same; this meant it would be difficult for him to work with the rest of the court.

Bao Shuya outlived his friend by a year.

== Impact ==
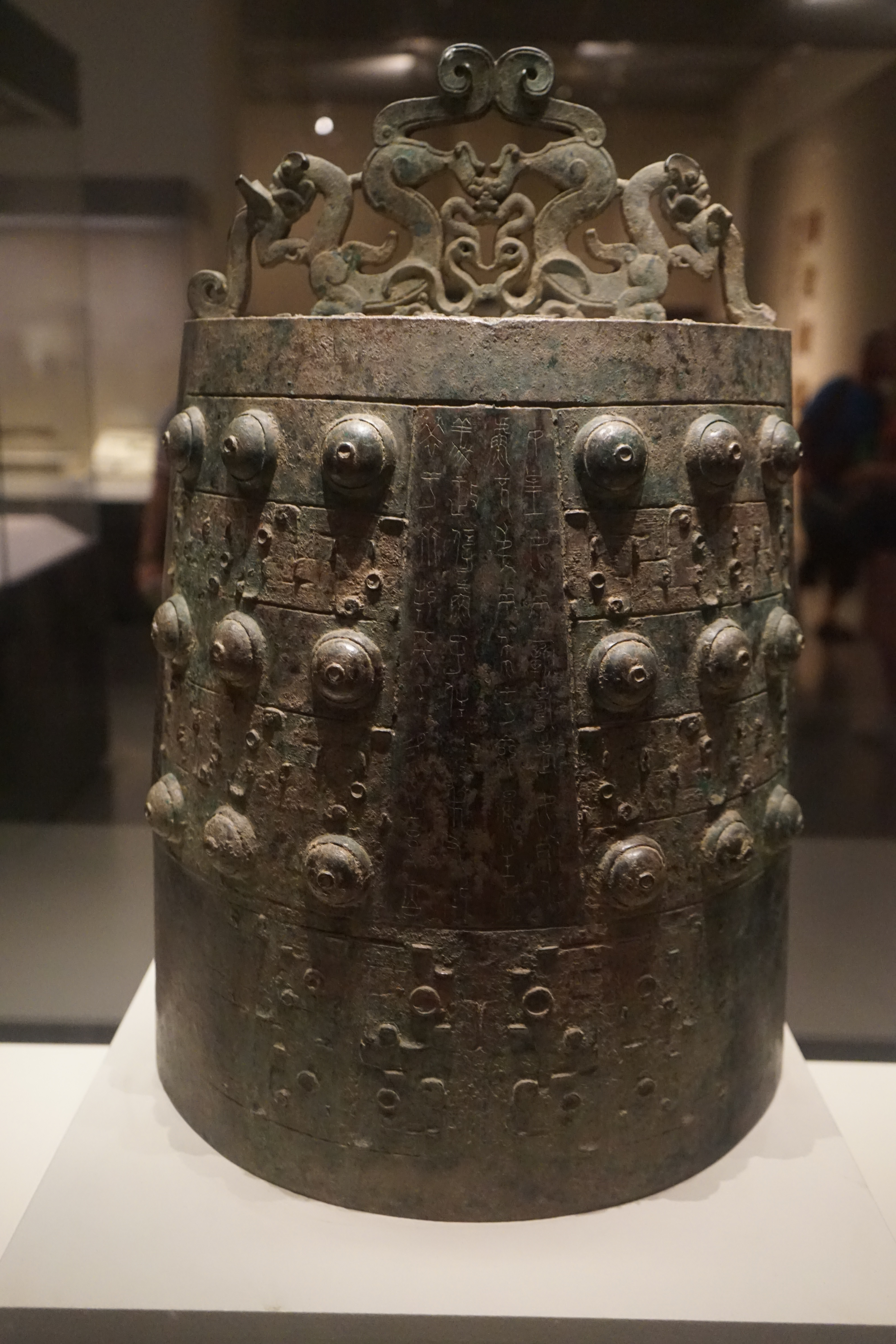
"Ling" Bronze Bo (percution instrument). Unearthed from Ronghe, Shanxi, 1870. The inscription on it records that Ling, the grandson of Bao Shuya, was granted land and commoners by the marquess of Qi and therefore commissioned this object.

In Chinese culture Bao Shuya is known mainly for his loyalty to his friend, as well as his open-mindedness and tolerance and his judgement of ability; Guan Zhong's political career and the subsequent power of the state of Qi arguably began from Bao's belief in his friend's talent, which he stood by firmly. The Shiji records a quote from Guan regarding his lifelong friend and supporter:

When Bao and I did business together I would take more profits for myself; he did not deem me greedy, but understood my poverty; when I came up with business ideas that incurred losses he did not deem me foolish, but put it down to business fluctuations. When I asked for audiences with lords thrice and was thrice rejected he did not deem me useless, but put it down to lack of opportunity; when I fled from battle thrice he did not deem me cowardly, but understood I had an ailing mother at home. When Prince Jiu was killed I was jailed and disgraced, and endured it; he did not deem me shameless, but knew I had greater ambitions. My parents gave birth to me, but it is Bao who knows me best!

Subsequently, Sima Qian himself commented:

Talented people like Guan Zhong are not rare in the world. Rare are the people like Bao Shuya who can recognise talent.

== Popular culture ==
Bao Shuya is one of the 32 historical figures who appear as special characters in the video game Romance of the Three Kingdoms XI by Koei.
