= Duke Xuan of Wey =

Ruler of Wey from 718 BC to 700 BC

Duke Xuan of Wey 衛宣公

Ruler of Wey
- Reign: 718 - 700 BC
- Predecessor: Zhouyu
- Successor: Duke Hui of Wey
- Died: 700 BC
- Spouse: Yi Jiang; Xuan Jiang
- Issue: Jizi (急子); Qianmou (黔牟); Wan (頑); Shou (壽); Shuo (朔; Duke Hui of Wey)
Names
- Ancestral name: Ji (姬); Given name: Jin (晉)
- House: House of Ji
- Father: Duke Zhuang I of Wey
- Mother: Unknown

Duke Xuan of Wey (died 700 BC), personal name Ji Jin, was the fifteenth ruler of the state of Wey and its fourth Duke, ruling from 718 BC to 700 BC. He came to power following a succession crisis involving two of his brothers, but his nineteen-year reign saw numerous moral scandals and the decline of Wey into a minor state of the Spring and Autumn period. He had a son with his father Duke Zhuang's concubine Yi Jiang, and later took the son's betrothed, Xuan Jiang, as his own wife because she was beautiful.

== Biography ==
Jin was one of the sons of Duke Zhuang I of Wey and a younger brother of Wan (完 (Note: Not to be confused with one of Jin's own sons Wan (頑).); Duke Huan of Wey). In 719 BC, Duke Huan was assassinated by his younger brother Zhouyu, who ruled for less than a year before he too was killed in a plot orchestrated by Shi Que and the ruler of Chen. Jin was installed as the next ruler and became known by his posthmous name Duke Xuan in Chinese historiography.

Duke Xuan had a son named Jizi with his deceased father's concubine Yi Jiang. When Jizi became the "Noble Son of the Right", a girl named Xuan Jiang from the state of Qi was selected to be his wife. Since Xuan Jiang was pretty, Duke Xuan took her for himself, and fathered two sons with her, Shou and Shuo. Shou became the "Noble Son of the Left". Yi Jiang hanged herself for reasons not explicitly stated.

One time, when Jizi was about to go to Qi, Xuan Jiang ordered soldiers to ambush and kill him on the way so that her sons would succeed the throne. However, Shou, who was clearly close to Jizi, informed him of the plot. When Jizi still decided to depart, Shou got him drunk and took his place. Jizi chased after him but was a step too late; both of them were killed by assassins. Shuo became the heir apparent and eventually succeeded his father as the next duke, known in Chinese historiography as Duke Hui of Wey.
