= King Huan of Zhou =

King of the Zhou dynasty from 719 to 697 BC

King Huan of Zhou 周桓王

King of the Zhou dynasty
- Reign: 719–697 BC
- Predecessor: King Ping of Zhou
- Successor: King Zhuang of Zhou
- Died: 697 BC
- Spouse: Ji Ji Jiang
- Issue: King Zhuang of Zhou; Zhou Wang Ji
Names
- Ancestral name: Jī (姬); Given name: Lín (林)
Posthumous name
- King Huan (桓王)
- House: Ji
- Dynasty: Zhou (Eastern Zhou)
- Father: Crown Prince Xiefu

King Huan of Zhou (Chinese: 周桓王; pinyin: Zhōu Huán Wáng; Wade–Giles: Chou Huan Wang; died 697 BC), personal name Ji Lin (姬林), was the 14th king of the Chinese Zhou dynasty and the second of the Eastern Zhou dynasty.

King Huan's father was King Ping's son, Crown Prince Xiefu (洩父). King Huan succeeded his grandfather in 719 BC.

In 707 BC, the Eastern Zhou forces were defeated in the Battle of Xuge by Duke Zhuang of Zheng. King Huan himself was wounded by an arrow in the shoulder, and the defeat destroyed the prestige of the Zhou royal court.

King Huan was succeeded by his son, King Zhuang, in 697 BC.

== Family ==
Queens:

- Ji Ji Jiang, of the Jiang clan of Ji (紀季姜 姜姓), a princess of Ji by birth; married in 703 BC

Sons:

- Prince Tuo (王子佗; d. 682 BC), ruled as King Zhuang of Zhou from 696–682 BC
- Prince Ke (王子克), fled to Southern Yan (南燕) in 694 BC

Daughters:

- Zhou Wang Ji (周王姬)
  - Married Duke Xiang of Qi (729–686 BC) in 695 BC

== See also ==
Family tree of ancient Chinese emperors

King Huan of Zhou Zhou dynasty Died: 697 BC
Regnal titles
| Preceded by King Ping of Zhou | King of China; 719–697 BC | Succeeded by King Zhuang of Zhou |
