= Duke Zhuang I of Qi =

Duke Zhuang I of Qi 齊前莊公

Duke of Qi
- Reign: 794–731 BC
- Predecessor: Duke Cheng
- Successor: Duke Xi
- Died: 731 BC
- Issue: Lü Dechen (呂得臣); Duke Xi; Yi Zhongnian (夷仲年); Lü Liao (呂廖); Zhuang Jiang (莊姜)
Names
- Ancestral name: Jiāng (姜); Clan name: Lǚ (呂); Given name: Gòu (購)
Posthumous name
- Duke Zhuang (莊公)
- House: Jiang
- Dynasty: Jiang Qi
- Father: Duke Cheng

Duke Zhuang I of Qi (Chinese: 齊前莊公; pinyin: Qí Qián Zhuāng Gōng), personal name Lü Gou, was the 12th ruler of the Jiang Qi state from 794 BC until his death in 731 BC.

== Reign ==
Lü Gou known in historiography as Duke Zhuang I of Qi, to distinguish from the later ruler with the same posthumous name.

Duke Zhuang succeeded his father Duke Cheng of Qi, who died in 795 BC, as ruler of Qi. He had a long reign during an era of upheaval in China. In 771 BC, the Quanrong tribes from the west attacked Haojing, the capital of the Zhou dynasty, and killed King You of Zhou. Duke Xiang of the state of Qin sent his army to escort King You's son King Ping of Zhou to the new capital Luoyi, marking the beginning of the Eastern Zhou dynasty. As a reward for Qin's protection King Ping formally granted Duke Xiang of Qin a nobility rank and elevated Qin to the status of a vassal state on par with other major states such as Qi and Jin. Although Qi was little affected by the turmoil as it was located east of the Zhou territory, the state of Qin would from then on grow stronger and eventually conquer Qi in 221 BC and unite China under the Qin dynasty.

Duke Zhuang reigned for 64 years and died in 731 BC. He was succeeded by his son, Duke Xi of Qi.

== Family ==
Wives:

- The mother of Crown Prince Dechen and Zhuang Jiang

Concubines:

- The mother of Prince Lufu and Yi Zhongnian

Sons:

- Crown Prince Dechen (太子得臣)
  - Served as a Grand Master (大夫) of Qi
- Prince Lufu (公子祿甫; d. 698 BC), ruled as Duke Xi of Qi from 730 to 698 BC
- A son (d. 699 BC) who was the father of Wuzhi, Duke of Qi
  - Known as Yi Zhongnian (夷仲年)
- Prince Liao (公子廖), the progenitor of the Xi lineage and the grandfather of Xi Peng (隰朋)
  - Served as a Grand Master (大夫) of Xiyin (隰陰)

Daughters:

- Zhuang Jiang (莊姜)
  - Married Duke Zhuang I of Wey (d. 735 BC)

Duke Zhuang I of Qi House of Jiang Died: 731 BC
Regnal titles
Preceded by Duke Cheng of Qi	Duke of Qi; 794–731 BC	Succeeded by Duke Xi of Qi
