= Duke Zhuang of Zheng =

8th-century BC ruler of Zheng

Duke Zhuang of Zheng 鄭莊公
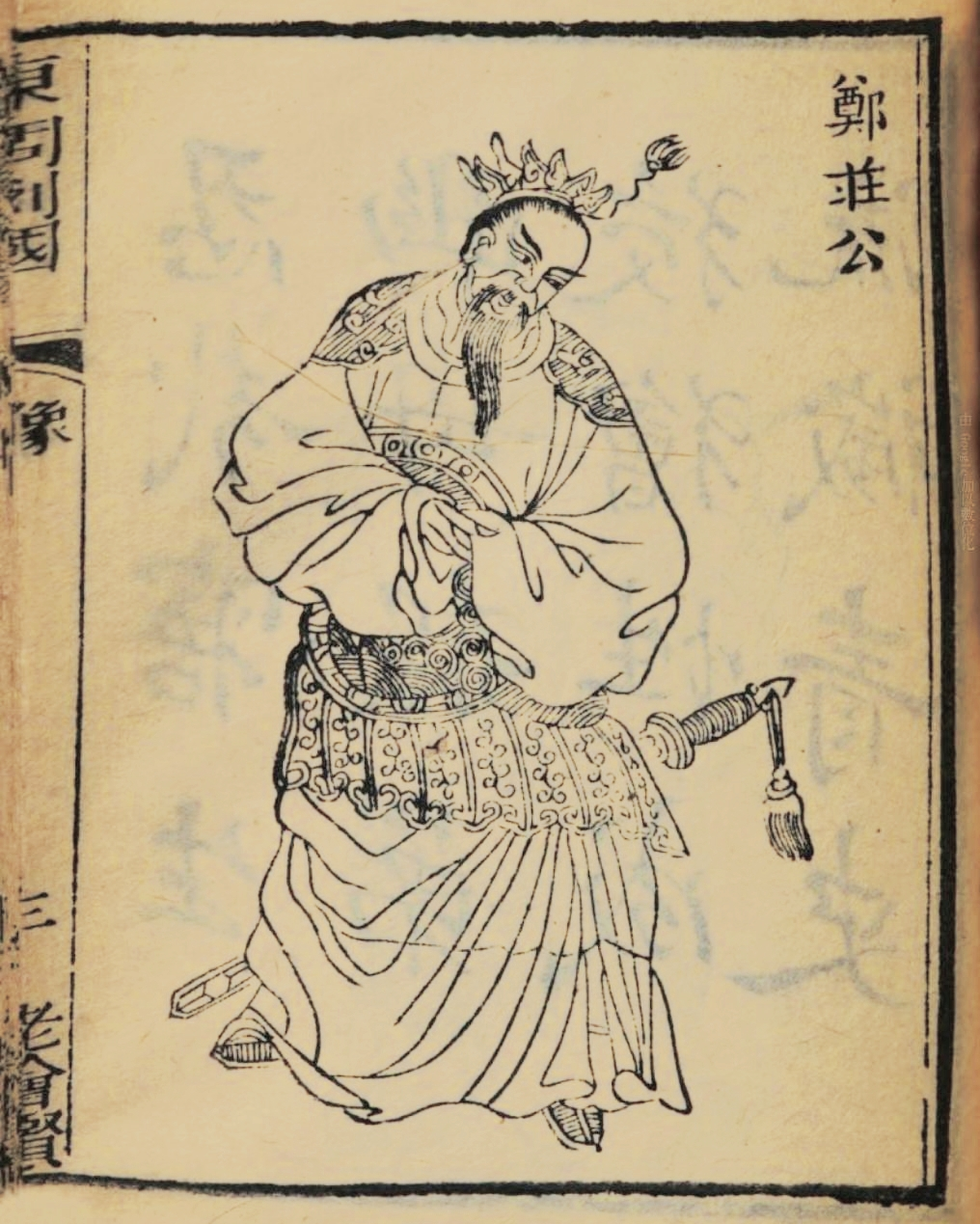

Ruler of Zheng
- Reign: 743 - 701 BC
- Predecessor: Duke Wu of Zheng
- Successor: Duke Zhao of Zheng
- Died: 701 BC
- Issue: Duke Zhao of Zheng; Duke Li of Zheng; Prince Wei; Prince Ying; Prince Ren
Names
- Ancestral name: Ji (姬); Given name: Wusheng (寤生)
Posthumous name
- Zhuang (莊)
- House: House of Ji
- Father: Duke Wu of Zheng
- Mother: Wu Jiang (武姜)

Duke Zhuang of Zheng (Chinese: 鄭莊公; 757–701 BC) was the third ruler of the State of Zheng during the Spring and Autumn period in ancient China. His ancestral name was Ji (姬), given name Wusheng (寤生), which means "difficult birth" with breech presentation. (Note: For other interpretations of 寤生 see Ni & Zhao (2023)) In 743 BC, he became the ruler of Zheng, and later defeated his younger brother Duan (Note: Duan is also known as Gongshu Duan (literally "Duan the Younger Brother of Gong", Gong being the place he would eventually flee to) or Jingshu Duan (Jing being the name of his later fief)), who had led a rebellion against him. Duke Zhuang led military campaigns in the name of the Zhou king against the Rong people and other Zhou states.

== Early life and rule ==
Wusheng was the first of two sons and groomed for the throne. His mother, Wu Jiang, nevertheless preferred her second son, Duan, because it was said that she had suffered extraordinary pain giving birth to him. She repeatedly asked Wusheng's father, Duke Wu of Zheng, to establish Duan as heir, but she was refused. Wusheng thus ascended to the throne in 743 BC, posthumously known as Duke Zhuang. Wu Jiang began plotting to get Duan into power. First, she asked Zhuang to give Duan the city of Zhi as a fief. Zhuang rejected this, but said that any other city would be permissible. Therefore, she requested that the city of Jing be given to Duan instead. At that time, Jing was the second largest city in Zheng, and was also a very important fortress. Zhuang was reluctant to give away the city of Jing. His courtiers begged him to reject the proposal, but out of courtesy for his mother he agreed.

Seeing that her plan was going well, Zhuang's mother urged Duan to build walls, stockpile arms and recruit soldiers to the rebel cause. Soon news of these actions reached the capital and its implications. Zhuang's ministers reported the news to him, urging him to retake Jing from Duan before it was too late. However, Zhuang dismissed these proposals, stating that he found no fault in Duan's actions and that he had no clear proof that Duan was plotting a coup, instead of merely reinforcing the city's borders. Zhuang also argued that as Duan was his brother, and he could not take up arms against him.

Soon afterwards Zhuang departed Zheng for Luoyang to deal with diplomatic matters. His mother then wrote a letter to Duan, ordering him to revolt against his brother and saying that she would open the gates of the capital for him. Duan thus started a revolt against Duke Zheng and, not long after, he reached the capital's walls. However, by this time, Duke Zhuang was aware that a revolt was to take place. So he returned in time to raise an army which defeated Duan at Yan (north of present-day Yanling County) during the summer of 722 BC.

Duke Zhuang was appointed Left Advisor by King Ping of Zhou. After King Ping's death, the following king, King Huan, removed Zhuang from office. In response to this slight, Duke Zhuang refused to go to the capital to meet with King Huan. King Huan then led a coalition in 707 BC against Duke Zhuang, which culminated in a Zheng victory at the Battle of Xuge. Duke Zhuang's army humiliated the king, defeating his army and inflicting an arrow wound on King Huan's shoulder, further diminishing the prestige of the Zhou royal house. After Zhuang's death in 701 BC, his sons fought a protracted war of succession (701–680 BC) over the leadership of Zheng.

== Succession ==
Duke Zhuang had 11 sons, among whom the most famous ones were Hu, Tu, Men and Yi. Hu was the heir and was created Duke Zhao of Zheng initially, but soon Duke Zhuang of Song interfered in the succession of Zheng and the minister of Zheng, Ji Zu, was forced to exile Duke Zhao and created Tu as Duke Li of Zheng. Men and Yi also escaped. Duke Li was also forced into exile after a failed plot against Ji Zu out of his hatred of feeling controlled by the latter, and Duke Zhao was restored. However, 3 years later, the vice minister, Gao Qumi, who had befriended Men and disliked Duke Zhao, committed an assassination and murdered Duke Zhao while Ji Zu was away, and created Men ruler instead, but the position of Ji Zu never changed. No more than 1 year later, Duke Xiang of Qi, who wanted fame, pretended to invite Men and Gao Qumi to Shouzhi and had them killed. Ji Zu created Yi as the duke and promised to be affiliated to Chu, while the exiled Duke Li also planned a restoration for himself. 17 years later, Duke Li with Qi troops defeated Yi, killed his two sons and managed to restore himself to power (in 680 BCE). The later dukes of Zheng were all descendants of Duke Li.

== Quotes ==
- '多行不義必自斃' (duō xíng bùyì bì zìbì; 'If he repeatedly commits undutiful acts, he surely will bring himself down.'; referring to his younger brother; similar to 'the wages of sin is death')
- '國不堪貳' (guó bùkān èr; 'a nation cannot have two leaders' advice given to Duke Zhuang by his minister Gongzi Lü)
