= Duke Xiang of Qi =

Duke of Qi from 697 BC to 686 BC

Duke Xiang of Qi 齊襄公

Duke of Qi
- Reign: 697–686 BC
- Predecessor: Duke Xi
- Successor: Lü Wuzhi
- Died: 686 BC
- Spouse: Wang Ji (王姬)
- Issue: Ai Jiang; Shu Jiang
Names
- Ancestral name: Jiāng (姜); Clan name: Lǚ (呂); Given name: Zhū'ér (諸兒)
Posthumous name
- Duke Xiang (襄公)
- House: Jiang
- Dynasty: Jiang Qi
- Father: Duke Xi

Duke Xiang of Qi (Chinese: 齊襄公; pinyin: Qí Xiāng Gōng), personal name Lü Zhu'er, was the 14th ruler of the Jiang Qi state from 697 BC until his death in 686 BC. He succeeded his father, Duke Xi.

Although under Duke Xiang the Qi state conquered the neighbouring state of Ji, its traditional enemy, Duke Xiang is best known for his depravity, having had an incestuous relationship with his sister, Wen Jiang, and murdered his brother-in-law, Duke Huan of Lu. At the end Duke Xiang was himself murdered by his cousin, Lü Wuzhi, who subsequently usurped the Qi throne.

== Murdering Duke Huan of Lu ==
Duke Xiang succeeded his father Duke Xi of Qi, who died in 698 BC after 33 years of reign. Duke Xiang had had an incestuous relationship with his younger half-sister Wen Jiang, who in 709 BC married Duke Huan, ruler of the neighbouring State of Lu. In 694 BC, Duke Huan of Lu visited Qi with his wife, and Duke Xiang and Wen Jiang renewed their sexual liaison.

When Duke Huan found out about the relationship between his wife and her own brother, Duke Xiang ordered his half brother Prince Pengsheng to murder Duke Huan in his carriage after he got drunk. The people of Lu were incensed at Duke Xiang's crime, but could not do anything because Qi was a stronger state. To appease Lu, Duke Xiang had Pengsheng executed as a scapegoat. Duke Zhuang of Lu, the son of Duke Huan and Wen Jiang, subsequently succeeded his father as ruler of Lu.

== Marriage ==
After the death of Duke Huan of Lu, Wen Jiang stayed in Qi and the incestuous relationship between the siblings continued. In 693 BC Duke Xiang married a daughter of the king of Zhou, the nominal ruler of all China, but the Zhou princess died only a year later.

== Conquering the State of Ji ==
In 690 BC the state of Qi conquered its neighbouring state of Ji (紀). Ji had been the enemy of Qi since at least the reign of Duke Ai of Qi about two centuries before Duke Xiang's time. Duke Ai was boiled to death by King Yi of Zhou after being slandered by the Marquis of Ji.

In 693 BC, Qi attacked the state of Ji, taking the cities of Ping, Zi, and Wu and expelling their residents. Two years later, a younger brother of the Marquis of Ji defected to Qi with the city of Xi. Unable to resist the aggression of Qi, in 690 BC the Marquis of Ji fled and gave over the state to the younger brother who had already submitted to Qi, effectively surrendering the state to Qi. The Marquis of Ji left in such a haste that he did not even bury his wife, a princess from the state of Lu, who had recently died. Duke Xiang gave the marquise a proper burial.

== Death and succession ==
In the twelfth month of 686 BC, the twelfth year of his reign, Duke Xiang was killed by his cousin Wuzhi. Wuzhi had been a favoured nephew of Duke Xiang's father Duke Xi and was treated like a crown prince, but when Duke Xiang ascended the throne, he demoted the status of Wuzhi. After Duke Xiang injured his foot on a hunting trip, Wuzhi killed Duke Xiang in his palace with the help of generals Lian Cheng and Guan Zhifu, who had been mistreated by Duke Xiang.

Wuzhi usurped the Qi throne after murdering Duke Xiang, but was also killed soon afterward. After a brief struggle between Duke Xiang's two younger brothers Prince Jiu and Prince Xiaobai, Xiaobai would win out and ascend the throne, posthumously known as Duke Huan of Qi. Qi would grow strong under Duke Huan's rule, and Duke Huan subsequently became the first of the Five Hegemons of the Spring and Autumn period.

== Family ==
Wives:

- Zhou Wang Ji, of the Ji clan of Zhou (周王姬 姬姓), a daughter of King Huan of Zhou and a younger sister of King Zhuang of Zhou; married in 695 BC

Sons:

- Prince Ji (公子季), the progenitor of the Qiji (齊季) lineage; fled to Chu in 686 BC

Daughters:

- Ai Jiang (哀姜; d. 660 BC)
  - Married Duke Zhuang of Lu (706–662 BC) in 670 BC
- Shu Jiang (叔姜)
  - Married Duke Zhuang of Lu (706–662 BC) in 670 BC as Ai Jiang's dowry, and had issue (Duke Min of Lu)

Duke Xiang of Qi House of Jiang Died: 686 BC
Regnal titles
Preceded by Duke Xi of Qi	Duke of Qi; 697–686 BC	Succeeded by Wuzhi
