= Wuzhi (Qi) =

Ruler of Qi (? – 685 BCE)

Lü Wuzhi 呂無知

Ruler of Qi
- Reign: 685 BC
- Predecessor: Duke Xiang
- Successor: Duke Huan
- Died: 685 BC
Names
- Ancestral name: Jiāng (姜); Clan name: Lǚ (呂); Given name: Wúzhī (無知)
- House: Jiang
- Dynasty: Jiang Qi
- Father: Yi Zhongnian (夷仲年)

Lü Wuzhi (Chinese: 呂無知; pinyin: Lǚ Wúzhī), also known as "Wuzhi, Grandson of Duke" (Chinese: 公孫無知) and "Wuzhi, Marquess of Qi" (Chinese: 齊侯無知), was the 15th ruler of the Jiang Qi state for a few months until his death in 685 BC.

== Early life ==
Wuzhi's father Yi Zhongnian was a son of Duke Zhuang I of Qi and younger brother of Duke Xi of Qi. Yi Zhongnian died in 699 BC, but Wuzhi's uncle Duke Xi loved him and gave him the same treatment as his son, Crown Prince Zhu'er. However, the next year Duke Xi died and Zhu'er, Wuzhi's cousin, ascended the throne (posthumously known as Duke Xiang of Qi). Duke Xiang disliked Wuzhi and demoted his status.

== Murdering Duke Xiang ==
In the twelfth month of 686 BC, the twelfth year of his reign, Duke Xiang injured his foot on a hunting trip. When the duke was recovering in his palace, Wuzhi killed him with the help of generals Lian Cheng (連稱) and Guan Zhifu (管至父), who had been mistreated by Duke Xiang.

== Death and succession ==
Wuzhi usurped the Qi throne after murdering Duke Xiang, but was killed by minister Yong Lin (雍廩) just a few months later in spring 685 BC. After a brief struggle between Duke Xiang's two younger brothers Prince Jiu and Prince Xiaobai, Xiaobai would prevail and ascend the throne, posthumously known as Duke Huan of Qi. Qi would grow strong under Duke Huan's rule, and Duke Huan subsequently became the first of the Five Hegemons of the Spring and Autumn period.

Wuzhi House of Jiang Died: 685 BC
Regnal titles
Preceded by Duke Xiang of Qi	Duke of Qi; 685 BC	Succeeded by Duke Huan of Qi
