= Zheng (state) =

Zhou dynasty Chinese vassal state (806–375 BC)

Zheng 鄭
- 806 BC–375 BC
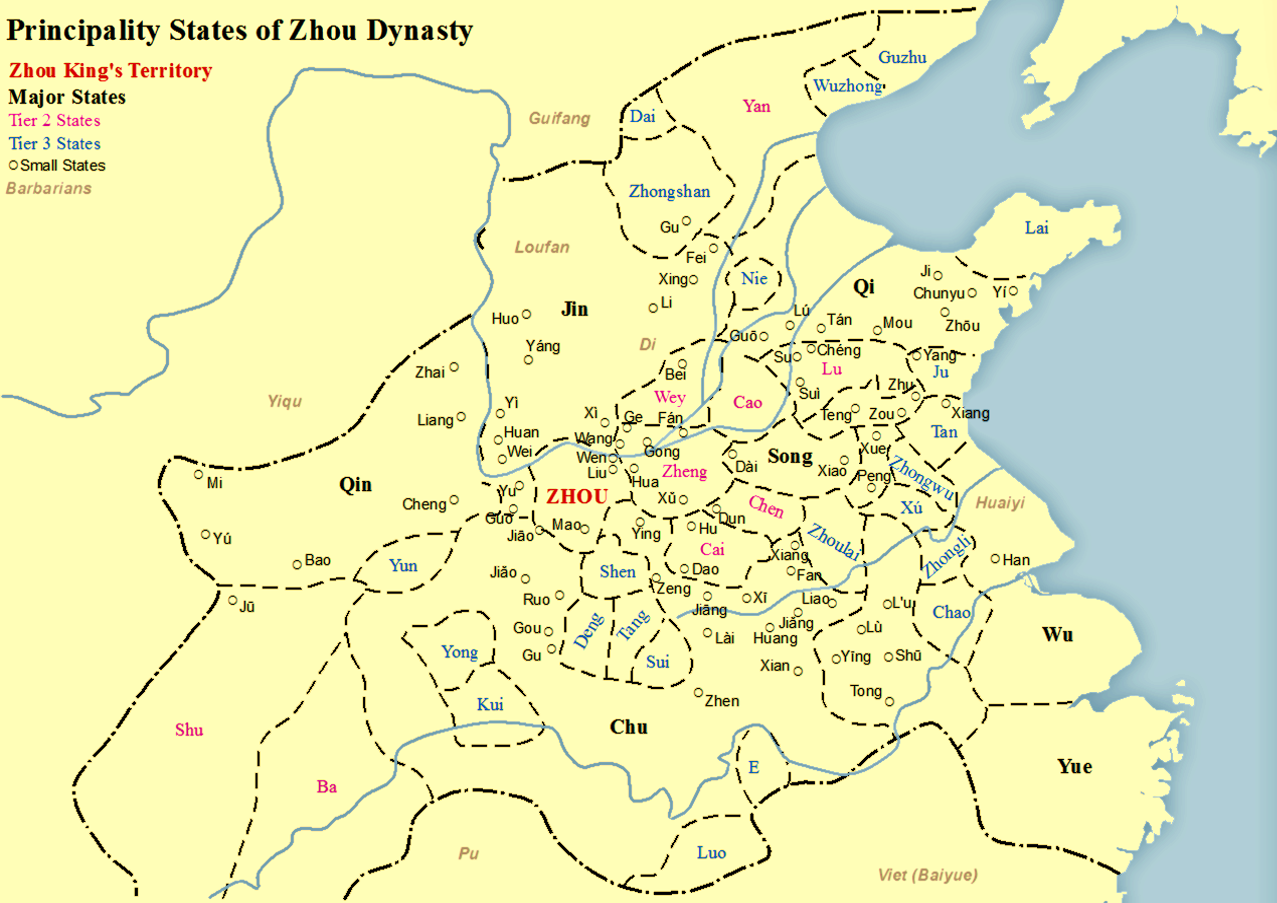
- Map of states in Zhou dynasty including Zheng
- Status: Duchy
- Capital: Zheng (鄭); Xinzheng (新鄭)
- Common languages: Old Chinese
- Religion: Taoism, Animism, ancestor worship
- Government: Monarchy
- Duke
  - 806–771 BC: Duke Huan of Zheng
  - 743–701 BC: Duke Zhuang of Zheng
  - 395–375 BC: Duke Kang of Zheng
- History
  - King Xuan of Zhou granting land to Prince You: 806 BC
  - Conquest by the State of Han: 375 BC
- Currency: Chinese coin; Spade coin
Preceded by	Succeeded by
Zhou dynasty	Han (Warring States)

Zheng
- "Zheng" in seal script (top), Traditional (middle), and Simplified (bottom) Chinese characters
- Traditional Chinese: 鄭
- Simplified Chinese: 郑
Transcriptions
Standard Mandarin
- Hanyu Pinyin: Zhèng
- Gwoyeu Romatzyh: Jenq
- Wade–Giles: Chêng^{4}
- IPA: [ʈʂə̂ŋ]
Wu
- Suzhounese: Zen^{6}
Yue: Cantonese
- Yale Romanization: Jehng
- Jyutping: Zeng^{6}
- IPA: [tsɛŋ˨]
Southern Min
- Hokkien POJ: Tē^{n}
- Tâi-lô: Tēnn
Old Chinese
- Baxter–Sagart (2014): *[d]reŋ-s

Zheng (/dʒɛŋ/; Chinese: 鄭; Old Chinese: *[d]reng-s) was a vassal state in China during the Zhou dynasty (1046–221 BCE) located in the centre of ancient China in modern-day Henan Province on the North China Plain about 75 miles (121 km) east of the royal capital at Luoyang. It was the most powerful of the vassal states at the beginning of the Eastern Zhou (771–701 BCE), and was the first state to clearly establish a code of law in its late period of 543 BCE. Its ruling house had the ancestral name Ji (姬), making them a branch of the Zhou royal house, who held the rank of Bo (伯), a kinship term meaning "elder".

== Foundation ==
Zheng was founded in 806 BC when King Xuan of Zhou, the penultimate king of the Western Zhou, made his younger brother Prince You (王子友) Duke of Zheng and granted him lands within the royal domain in the eponymous Zheng in modern-day Hua County, Shaanxi on the Wei River east of Xi'an. Prince You, known posthumously as Duke Huan of Zheng, established what would be the last bastion of Western Zhou. He went on to serve as Situ under King You of Zhou. When the Quanrong tribes sacked the Zhou capital Haojing in 771 BC, Duke Huan was killed along with his nephew King You of Zhou.

Duke Huan was succeeded by his son Duke Wu (鄭武公). Along with Marquis Wen of Jin, Duke Wu supported King Ping of Zhou against a rival, thereby helping to establish the Eastern Zhou. He re-established the state of Zheng in modern-day Xinzheng (meaning New Zheng), Henan, and annexed the state of Eastern Guo and defeated Kuai. The Zheng rulers served as high ministers of the Zhou kings for several generations.

== Spring and Autumn period ==
=== Early dominance ===
The state of Zheng was one of the strongest at the beginning of the Spring and Autumn period. Throughout the Spring and Autumn period, Zheng was one of the wealthiest states, relying on its central location for inter-state commerce and having the largest number of merchants of any state. Zheng often used its wealth to bribe itself out of difficult situations.

Duke Zhuang of Zheng (743–701 BC) was arguably a forerunner of the Five Hegemons, though Zheng derived its dominance by dramatically different means compared to those of the later hegemons by defeating an alliance of feudal states led by Zhou itself and wounding King Huan of Zhou. When Duke Zhuang died there was a civil war between his sons and Zheng ceased to be a powerful state.

=== Duke Wen and Tai Bo ===
This bamboo manuscript records a conversation about Zheng history between Duke Wen of Zheng (r. 672–628 BCE) and the elderly Tai Bo. Zheng state's beginning under Duke Huan (r. 806–771) is recalled by Tai Bo. Duke Huan's son Duke Wu (r. 770–744) moved Zheng state east. Its neighboring states acknowledged Zheng as a paramount power. Duke Zhuang (r. 743–701) furthered Zheng state's position of dominance.

When Duke Zhuang died his elder son Duke Zhao (r. 701, 697–695) took his place. Yet the powerful Zhai Zhong favored his younger son Duke Li (r. 701–697, 680–673) and deposed Zhao to install him. Li, however, later failed to wrest control from Zhai Zhong and was pushed into exiled. After a few years Duke Zhengzi Ying (r. 694–680), Li's younger brother, became the nominal ruler of Zheng, until he was assassinated. Duke Li then returned to rule.

Zheng Wen Gong was the son of Duke Li. At his father's death, Wen's succession was fraught with difficulties. He tells of the help given him by Tai Bo. It allowed Wen to reside in the traditional shed of mourning for his father, and so begin his 45-year rule [672-628].

Yet Tai Bo criticized Duke Wen for his seeking the ease of domestic pleasure. The Duke's principal consort Lady Mi came from Chu state. At times during the rule of Duke Wen, the affairs of Zheng fell under the influence of this powerful state to the south, Chu.

=== Later period ===
Chinese states, 5th century BCE

As competition between states intensified, Zheng had no room to expand. Due to its central location, Zheng was hemmed in on all sides by larger states.

During the later stages of the Spring and Autumn period, its territory became of pivotal interest in the rivalry of more powerful states. Zheng was often compelled to switch its diplomatic alliances. It had become a focus of contention between Chu and Qi, then later Chu and Jin. By the 7th century BCE Zheng found itself forced into a minor role.

Notwithstanding, Zheng remained quite strong into the middle and later years of the Spring and Autumn. Under Duke Mu (r. 628–606) Zheng managed to defeat a combined alliance of Jin, Song, Chen and Wei in 607 BCE.

Zheng's prime minister Zichan (543–522) became widely known as a leading statesman among the rival states of the era. Zichan was a grandson of Duke Mu. Zheng was also widely recognized as the first state of China to publish its laws, in bronze in 536 BCE.

Zheng later declined, due to disorders from conflicts among as its feuding clans. In 375 BCE during the following Warring States period Zheng was annexed by Han state.

==== Xingyang ====
The Zheng family of Xingyang 荥阳郑氏 claim descent from the Zhou dynasty kings through the rulers of the State of Zheng.

The Marquis of Xingyang rank was created for Zheng Xi. The Xingyang Zheng descendants included Zheng Daozhao and Zheng Xi. Zheng Wanjun was a member of the Xingyang Zheng. Other Xingyang Zheng descendants were Zheng Yuzhong (Zheng Qiao) and Zheng Jiong.

== List of rulers ==
Title	Given name	Reign
Duke Huan of Zheng 鄭桓公	Yǒu 友	806–771 BC
Duke Wu of Zheng 鄭武公	Juétú 掘突	770–744 BC
Duke Zhuang of Zheng 鄭莊公	Wùshēng 寤生	743–701 BC
Duke Zhao of Zheng 鄭昭公	Hū 忽	701 BC
Duke Li of Zheng 鄭厲公	Tú 突	700–697 BC
Duke Zhao of Zheng (second reign) 鄭昭公	Hū 忽	696–695 BC
Zheng-zi Wei 鄭子亹	Wěi 亹	694 BC
Zheng-zi Ying 鄭子嬰	Yīng 嬰	693–680 BC
Duke Li of Zheng (second reign) 鄭厲公	Tú 突	679–673 BC
Duke Wen of Zheng 鄭文公	Jié 踕	672–628 BC
Duke Mu of Zheng 鄭穆公	Lán 蘭	627–606 BC
Duke Ling of Zheng 鄭靈公	Yí 夷	605 BC
Duke Xiang of Zheng 鄭襄公	Jiān 堅	604–587 BC
Duke Dao of Zheng 鄭悼公	Fèi 沸	586–585 BC
Duke Cheng of Zheng 鄭成公	Gùn 睔	584–581 BC
Prince Xu of Zheng 公子繻	Xū 繻	581 BC
Duke Xi of Zheng 鄭僖公	Yùn 惲	581 BC
Duke Cheng of Zheng (second reign) 鄭成公	Gùn 睔	581–571 BC
Duke Xi of Zheng (second reign) 鄭僖公	Yùn 惲	570–566 BC
Duke Jian of Zheng 鄭簡公	Jiā 嘉	565–530 BC
Duke Ding of Zheng 鄭定公	Níng 寧	529–514 BC
Duke Xian of Zheng 鄭獻公	Dǔn 躉	513–501 BC
Duke Sheng of Zheng 鄭聲公	Shèng 勝	500–463 BC
Duke Ai of Zheng 鄭哀公	Yì 易	462–455 BC
Duke Gong of Zheng 鄭共公	Chǒu 丑	455–424 BC
Duke You of Zheng 鄭幽公	Jǐ 已	423 BC
Duke Xu of Zheng 鄭繻公	Tái 駘	422–396 BC
Duke Kang of Zheng 鄭康公	Yǐ 乙	395–375 BC

=== Rulers family tree ===
Zheng state

Seven Mu
Duke Huan of Zheng 郑桓公; 806–771 BC
Duke Wu of Zheng 郑武公; 770–744 BC
Duke Zhuang of Zheng 郑庄公; 757–743 BC – 701 BC	Gongshu Duan 共叔段
Duke Zhao of Zheng 郑昭公; 700; 696–695 BC	Duke Li of Zheng 郑厉公; 700–697; 679–673 BC	Zheng-zi Wei 鄭子亹; 694 BC	Zheng-zi Ying 鄭子嬰; 693–680 BC	子人
Duke Wen of Zheng 郑文公; 672–628 BC	叔詹
太子华	Duke Mu of Zheng 郑穆公; 627–606BC	子臧	公子士	公子瑕	子俞弥
Duke Ling of Zheng 郑灵公; 605 BC	Duke Xiang of Zheng 郑襄公; 604–587 BC	子良	子游	子罕	子驷	子国	子孔 孔氏	子印	子丰	士子孔 大季氏	子然	子羽
Duke Dao of Zheng 郑悼公; 586–585 BC	Prince Xu of Zheng 公子繻; 581 BC	Duke Cheng of Zheng 郑成公; 584–571 BC	Zichan
Duke Xi of Zheng 郑僖公; 570–566 BC
Duke Jian of Zheng 郑简公; 570–565 BC – 530 BC
Duke Ding of Zheng 郑定公; 529–514 BC
Duke Xian of Zheng 郑献公; 513–501 BC
Duke Sheng of Zheng 郑声公; 500–463 BC	Duke Gong of Zheng 郑共公; 455–424 BC
Duke Ai of Zheng 郑哀公; 462–455 BC	Duke You of Zheng 郑幽公; 423 BC	Duke Kang of Zheng 郑康公; 395–375 BC
Duke Xu of Zheng 郑繻公; 422–396 BC

== Other people from Zheng ==
- Zichan, celebrated philosopher and statesman
- Zheng Mao (鄭瞀), exemplary woman of the Lienü zhuan
- Shen Buhai 申不害, future Prime Minister of Han and "Legalist" philosopher.
- Lie Yukou (Chinese: 列禦寇), author of the Daoist book Liezi
