= Jeju Jwa clan =

Korean clan from Jeju Province

- Country: Korea
- Current region: Jeju Province
- Founder: Jwa Hyeong so

Jeju Jwa clan (Korean: 제주 좌씨; Hanja: 濟州 左氏) was one of the Korean clans. Their Bon-gwan was in Jeju Province. According to the research in 2000, the number of Jeju Jwa clan was 3,130. The name of Jwa clan came from Zuo Qiuming (Hanja: 左丘明) who was a politician in Lu, China. Jeju Jwa clan’s founder was Jwa Hyeong so who was a Cheongwansirang (Hanja: 天官侍郎) in Yuan dynasty. He took his post as government official when Yuan dynasty ruled Goryeo.

== See also ==
- Korean clan names of foreign origin
