= Duke You =

Duke You may refer to these ancient Chinese rulers:

- Duke You of Lu (died 974 BC or 975 BC)
- Duke You of Chen (died 832 BC)
- Duke You of Jin (died 416 BC)

== See also ==
- King You (disambiguation)
