= Mu Jiang =

Chinese duchess (621–564 BC)

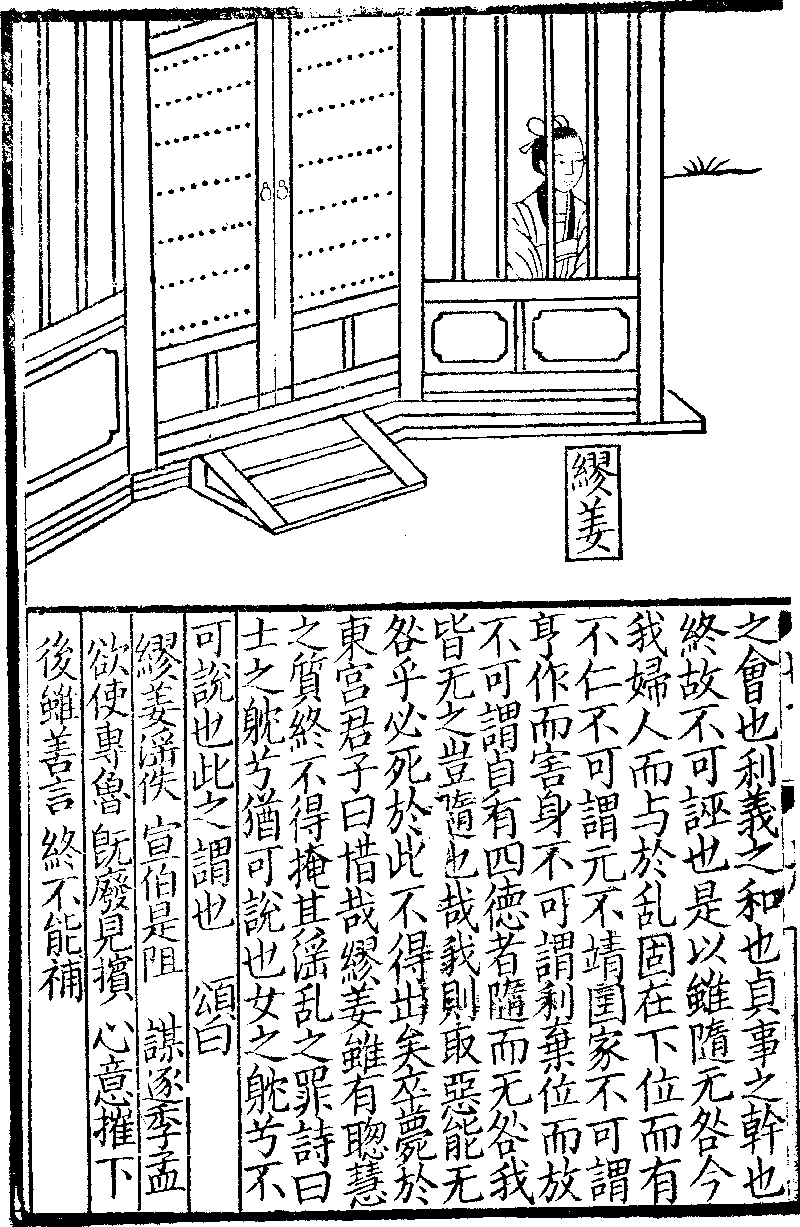
Mu Jiang

Mu Jiang or Miu Chiang (Chinese: 穆姜; 621 BC – 6 May 564 BC), was the duchess consort of Duke Xuan of Lu (r. 608 – 591 BC) during the Spring and Autumn period of Chinese history.

She was the daughter of one of the dukes of Qi. She married Duke Xuan of Lu and became the mother of future Duke Cheng of Lu (r. 590–573 BC).

Both her spouse and her son were passive and weak-willed rulers, and Mu Jiang had great influence over the affairs of state during their rule, supported by her status as a member of the ruling family of Qi, on which Lu was dependent. She influenced the decisions of war and peace and participated in negotiations with foreign states. Her main focus was to crush the powerful Ji (季) and Meng (孟) clans. In 575, she finally convinced her son to have them punished on the excuse of treason. He promised to do so on return from the war, but in his absence, she had her lover Shusun Qiao act against them. Their action failed and ended in a coup, during which her lover was forced to flee while she was placed in house arrest in the Eastern Hall by the Ji and Meng clans.

She remained in house arrest until she died on 6 May 564 BC. According to the Zuo Zhuan, when she first moved to the Eastern Hall, she divined by dried yarrow to see if she would leave someday. While the diviner provided a positive answer, she disputed the interpretation, claiming that it did not apply to her, who "[had] taken up evil." She was laid to rest on 27 July.

She is included in the "Biographies of Pernicious and Depraved Women" (孽嬖) of the Biographies of Eminent women (Lienü Zhuan).
