= Duke Ding of Lu =

Duke Ding of Lu 魯定公

Ruler of Lu
- Reign: 24 May 509 – 15 May 495 BC
- Predecessor: Duke Zhao of Lu
- Successor: Duke Ai of Lu
- Died: 495 BC
- Issue: Duke Ai of Lu
Names
- Ancestral name: Ji (姬); Given name: Song (宋)
Posthumous name
- Ding (定)
- House: House of Ji
- Father: Duke Xiang of Lu

Duke Ding of Lu (Chinese: 魯定公; pinyin: Lǔ Dìng Gōng, 556 BC – 15 May 495 BC) was a ruler of the State of Lu during the Spring and Autumn period of ancient China. His ancestral name was Ji (姬), given name Song (宋), and Duke Ding was his posthumous title.

Since the reign of Duke Xuan of Lu, The politics of Lu had been dominated by multiple cadet branches of the ducal house, particularly the Three Huan: Jisun (季孫), Shusun (叔孫), and Mengsun (孟孫). Efforts of Confucius, who served as Duke Ding's Minister of Crime (大司寇), to curb the power of the Three Huan were met with failure. Eventual political differences and externally-fomented discord caused Confucius to go on exile, seeking to realize his ambitions elsewhere.

== Accession ==
Prince Song was a son of Duke Xiang of Lu and a younger brother of Duke Zhao of Lu, who, also being his predecessor, died in exile after being expelled by the Three Huan after a failed coup to remove them from power in 517 BC. Despite the absence of a duke for seven years, the Three Huan only made Prince Song the new duke after Duke Zhao's body arrived at Lu. This was done despite the fact that Duke Zhao had sons of his own and had even designated one of them his heir.

== Power Struggle Throughout the Realm ==
=== Contention Between Clan Leaders and Retainers ===
During Duke Ding's period of the Spring and Autumn period, aristocratic clans of some states in the realm had been encroaching on the authority of their rulers much like how these rulers were undermining the authority of the Son of Heaven. Furthermore, these aristocratic clans' authorities were themselves under contention between the heads and their powerful retainers.

==== Jisun Clan ====
On 31 May, 505 BC, Jisun Yiru, the head of the Jisun clan (the leading clan of the Three Huan and, indeed, all of Lu), died while returning home from a tour. On 7 September, Yang Hu, a retainer of the Jisun clan, launched a coup against his master Jisun Si, Viscount Huan of Jisun, imprisoning him. After forcing Jisun Si to banish his political opponents and make a covenant, Yang Hu released Jisun Si, but seized control of the Jisun clan and, by extension, the Lu government.

In winter 504 BC, Jisun Si led an army to lay siege of Yun (鄆), a city that Qi had conquered from Lu in 517 BC and given to Duke Zhao of Lu as a base of operations for his return. Qi surrendered Yun a year later, in spring 503 BC, and Yang Hu occupied it as his own base of power.

In 502 BC, Yang Hu launched a coup against the Three Huan with his political allies, all of whom were disgruntled to some degree:

- Ji Wu, younger brother of Jisun Si, the head of the Jisun clan
- Shusun Zhe, a son of Shusun Zhouchou, the head of the Shusun clan
- Gongchu Ji, a member of the Gongchu clan, a cadet branch of the Jisun clan
- Shuzhong Zhi, a son of Shuzhong Xiao, the head of the Shuzhong clan, which was a cadet branch of the Shusun clan
- Gongshan Buniu, Yang Hu's fellow retainer of the Jisun clan. Steward of Jisun settlement of Bi (費)

The goal of the coup was to remove the heads of all three clans of the Three Huan and make Ji Wu the head of the Jisun clan, Shusun Zhe the head of the Shusun clan, and Yang Hu himself as the head of the Mengsun clan. The first part of the coup involved assassinating Jisun Si while offering him ceremonial toasts at the Pu Gardens (蒲圃) outside of Qufu, the capital of Lu on 9 September, 502 BC. Yang Hu put the capital guard on high alert and instructed them to arrive at the Pu Gardens on the day after the planned assassination. Gonglian Yang, a retainer of the Mengsun clan, correctly guessed that a coup against the Mengsun clan was underway and notified Zhongsun Heji, Viscount Yi of Mengsun, the head of the Mengsun clan.

The conspirators arranged for armed men to be on Jisun Si's side as Jisun Si made his way to the Pu Gardens, and Yang Hu personally rode ahead of Jisun Si's chariot, while Yang Yue (陽越), Yang Hu's brother, rode behind it. Jisun Si, who knew that an attempt on his life was imminent, appealed to Lin Chu (林楚), his charioteer, for help, which he, being from generations of Jisun loyalists, gave by steering towards the Mengsun compound as Jisun Si ordered.

The Mengsun clan had prepared for the coup by stationing three hundred strong workers at the compound in the guise of working on the building. Once Jisun Si entered the compound, the workers closed the gates. A worker shot and killed Yang Yue, who was pursuing the chariot, while Yang Hu took Duke Ding and Shusun Zhouchou hostage and attacked the Mengsun compound. A force led by Gonglian Yang eventually defeated Yang Hu, who, after fleeing from Qufu, rose in open rebellion at his base in Yangguan (陽關).

In 501 BC, the Lu army attacked Yangguan, but Yang Hu managed to flee to Qi after surprising the attacking army by burning one of the city gates. At Qi, Yang Hu tried to convince Duke Jing of Qi to attack Lu, but Minister Bao Guo, Viscount Wen of Bao, dissuaded him, observing that:

Yang Hu wishes to strain the Qi army. When the Qi army is exhausted, many of the great subjects are sure to have died, and he will then set his scheme in motion. Now this Yang Hu enjoyed favor with the Ji lineage, yet he was going to kill [Viscount Huan of Jisun] in order to act against the interests of the domain of Lu and seek acceptance here. He sticks close to wealth, not to humaneness: how will you employ him? You are wealthier than the Ji lineage and greater than the domain of Lu, and this is what Yang Hu wants to overturn. Would it not be harmful if Lu were to throw off its affliction while you then claim it as your own?

The Duke of Qi then arrested Yang Hu, but he escaped in a clothing dray, was caught, and again escaped in the same manner. Yang Hu then escaped to Song and then to Jin. There, he served under the Zhao clan. Confucius later commented, "The Zhao line will have trouble for generations!"

Gongshan Buniu fled back to Bi, while Shusun Zhe followed him. The fate of the other conspirators is unknown.

==== Shusun Clan ====
Gongruo Miao, the Steward of Hou (郈), the Shusun seat of power, had opposed Shusun Zhouchou becoming the head of the Shusun clan, so, in summer 500 BC, Shusun Zhouchou, after his accession, tried to have Hou Fan, the Director of Horse of Hou, to kill Gongruo Miao, but he was unsuccessful in convincing him. Eventually, however, Shusun Zhouchou managed to kill Gongruo Miao by accepting a groom's advice and have him pass through the court holding a sword, piquing Gongruo Miao's interest in it, and thrusting the sword into him after presenting it to him blade first.

Hou Fan then seized control of Hou and rebelled. Shusun Zhouchou, despite aid from the Mengsun clan, was unable to crush the rebellion, so he sought aid from Qi. Si Chi (駟赤), Hou's Preceptor of Artisans, managed to trick Hou Fan into fleeing Hou and saved Hou from an opportunistic seizure by Qi.

=== Conflict Between the Duke and the Three Huan ===
According to the Records of the Grand Historian, Duke Ding made Confucius the governor of a minor town (中都宰) in 501 BC. Confucius quickly rose through the ranks, becoming Minister of Works (司空) and then Minister of Crime (大司寇). Additionally, he took on the duties and responsibilities of a Prime Minister.

In 498 BC, (Note: According to the Zuo Zhuan. According to the Records of the Grand Historian, this event occurred one year later, in 497 BC.) Confucius orchestrated a plan to raze the walls of the seats of power of the Three Huan: Hou (郈) of the Shusun clan, Bi (費) of the Jisun clan, and Cheng (郕) of the Mengsun clan. The Shusun clan, having recently experienced a rebellion making used of the walls of Hou, voluntarily razed them. As the Jisun clan began to raze the walls of Bi, Gongshan Buniu and Shusun Zhe, who had rebelled against the Jisun clan four years prior but managed to flee to Bi, rebelled again in defiance, but were soon defeated and forced to flee to Qi. Then, the walls of Bi were razed as well.

It was then that Gonglian Yang, a Mengsun retainer, advised Zhongsun Heji, the head of the Mengsun clan, that razing the walls of Cheng, which was close to the border with Qi, would certainly attract a Qi invasion and that the safety of Cheng was one and the same as the safety of the Mengsun clan. Zhongsun Heji, following further advice from Gonglian Yang, pretended not to know about the order to raze the walls. A ducal army laid siege to Cheng in order to enforce the order, but the attack failed. Cheng's walls were saved.

Eventually, political disagreements with the Duke and the Three Huan caused Confucius to go on self-exile. According to the Records of the Grand Historian, the leaders of Qi were fearful that Confucius might, after strengthening Lu, may attack or even annex Qi outright. Li Chu, a Qi official, proposed to alienate Duke Ding and Confucius by sending dancing women and beautiful horses to Duke Ding so that he would cease to care about administering his country. After receiving the gift, Jisun Si sent it to the Duke. The plot was successful as intended, and Confucius, disappointed, left Lu. This story is not without dispute, however.

== Death and Succession ==
In summer 495 BC, Duke Ding died and was succeeded by his son, Prince Jiang (將), who would become known as Duke Ai of Lu.

== Bibliography ==
- Zuo Zhuan, Duke Ding
- Gongyang Zhuan, Duke Ding
- Shiji, vol. 33, 47
- Durrant, Stephen; Li, Wai-yee; Schaberg, David (2016). Zuo Tradition/Zuozhuan: Commentary on the "Spring and Autumn Annals" (1st ed.). Seattle: University of Washington Press. ISBN 9780295999159.
- Dubs, H. H. (1946). "The Political Career of Confucius". Journal of the American Oriental Society. 66 (4): 273–282. doi:10.2307/596405.
- Miller, Harry (2015). The Gongyang Commentary on The Spring and Autumn Annals. New York: Palgrave Macmillan US. doi:10.1057/9781137493002. ISBN 978-1-349-50514-2.

Duke Ding of Lu House of Ji Cadet branch of the House of Ji Born: 556 BC Died: 495 BC
Regnal titles
Preceded by Duke Zhao of Lu	Duke of Lu; 509-495 BC	Succeeded by Duke Ai of Lu
