= Duke Ai of Lu =

Duke Ai of Lu 魯哀公

Ruler of Lu
- Reign: 494 BC-468 BC
- Predecessor: Duke Ding of Lu
- Successor: Duke Dao of Lu
- Died: 468 BC
- Issue: Duke Dao of Lu; Prince Jing (荆); Prince Tun (𪏆)
Names
- Ancestral name: Ji (姬); Given name: Jiang (將)
Posthumous name
- Ai (哀)
- House: House of Ji
- Father: Duke Ding of Lu

Duke Ai of Lu (Chinese: 魯哀公, died 468 BC) was a ruler of the State of Lu during the Spring and Autumn period of ancient China. His ancestral name was Ji (姬), given name Jiang (將), and Duke Ai was his posthumous title.

== Accession and early reign ==
Prince Jiang (將), a son of Duke Ding of Lu, succeeded him upon his death in 495 BC. Political power of Lu had long being in the hands of three cadet houses of the ducal family collectively named the Three Huan, despite multiple dukes' attempts to retake power. Out of the Three Huan, the Jisun (季孫) clan was the most powerful.

=== Warfare against Zhu ===
Zhu was a minor state next to Lu, which had fought it for many generations. A Lu expedition against it in 494 BC ended with Zhu ceding the lands between Guo (漷) and Yi (沂) Rivers in the following year. This did not stop Lu from attacking Zhu again in 492 BC and 488 BC. In the latter attack, led by Duke Ai himself, the Lu army sacked the capital of Zhu and captured its ruler Duke Yin of Zhu. Diplomatic pressure from Wu caused Lu to release the Zhu ruler in 487 BC, but he was deposed in the same year by Wu, which installed his son Duke Huan of Zhu and forced him into exile in Qi. However, Duke Yin of Zhu would be restored to his throne by Yue in summer 473 BC.

=== Diplomacy with Wu ===
Centered in what is now southern Jiangsu, Wu was a rapidly-expanding state that had sacked Chu capital Ying in 506 BC and had recently subjugated its southern neighbor Yue in 494 BC. It was under this context that Duke Ai met with a Wu envoy at Zeng (鄫) in 488 BC. The Wu envoy demanded 100 sets of sacrificial animals (one of ox, sheep, and pig). When met with refusal of Lu minister Zifu He, Count Jing of Zifu, he claimed that Song had already done the same and that Lu itself offered Jin ministers more than ten sets. Though Zifu He warned that such a demand would be a breach of ritual propriety (after noting that the gift to the Jin minister was a result of intimidation and that even the Son of Heaven could only use at most twelve) and would not win the allegiance of the states, the Wu envoy insisted on the demand. Lu complied to the demand, and Zifu He commented: "Wu is going to fall. They dismiss Heaven and neglect their roots." The King of Wu being a descendent of the Zhou royal house just like the Son of Heaven.

Bo Pi, Grand Steward of Wu, summoned Jisun Fei, the head of the Jisun clan, for an explanation and an apology, but he sent his Zigong, his retainer and one of Confucius's disciples, to Bo Pi. When Bo Pi questioned Zigong of Jisun Fei's choice, he replied:

We act out of fear for your great domain. Your great domain is not commanding the princes according to ritual propriety, and if you fail to act according to ritual propriety, then how is it possible for us to take your proper measure? When our unworthy ruler is already following your commands, how can his senior officials presume to relinquish their domain? Taibo implemented the Zhou rituals in robes and cap, but when Zhongyong succeeded him, he cut his hair and tattooed his body, adorning himself in his nakedness: was that ritual propriety?

Later, Jisun Fei concluded that Wu would achieve nothing.

=== Warfare against Wu ===
In spring 487 BC, Wu attacked Lu in response to Lu's attack on Zhu in the previous year. Such an invasion was opposed by Shusun Zhe and Gongshan Buniu, two Lu officials affiliated with the Three Huan who had fled to Wu after failing to resist Confucius's attempts to curb the Three Huan's power. Regardless, King Fuchai of Wu went ahead with the invasion. A lack of swift military victories eventually caused the Wu army to turn back after swearing a covenant with Lu at the gates of Qufu, the Lu capital.

=== Warfare against Qi ===
Qi attacked Lu in summer 487 BC. Prior to acceding to the throne, Duke Dao of Qi had sought refuge in Lu due to a succession dispute in Qi. During this time, Jisun Fei had betrothed his younger sister to Duke Dao. After Duke Dao returned to Qi to ascend to the Qi throne, he sent for his wife in Lu. However, she had an adulterous affair with her uncle Ji Fanghou (季魴侯). The woman told the truth to her brother Jisun Fei, who dared not send her to Qi, fearing Duke Dao's discovery of the affair. Duke Dao, furious, sent an army led by Qi minister Bao Mu to attack Lu, taking the Lu lands of Huan (讙) and Chan (闡). In autumn of the same year, Lu and Qi made peace, and Duke Dao's wife was sent to him. Huan and Chan were returned to Lu later in the same year.

In spring 485 BC, Lu joined an alliance lead by Wu to attack the southern borders of Qi. During this time, Duke Dao of Qi was murdered. King Fuchai of Wu, the commander of the allied forces, cried for three days outside of the army camp and turned his armies back, following a ritual stipulating that no expedition against a country could be done when it is in mourning of its ruler.

In spring 484 BC, a Qi force led by Qi minister Guo Shu invaded Lu and was approaching Qufu. Ran Qiu, a Jisun retainer and a disciple of Confucius, managed to convince Jisun Fei to resist despite the disunity of the Three Huan. The Qi and Lu forces clashed at Jiqu (稷曲), in the outskirts of Qufu. In this battle, Lu repelled the Qi forces. Ran Qiu requested Jisun Fei to pursue the retreating Qi army three times and was denied such request three times.

Soon after, in summer 484 BC, King Fuchai attacked Qi once again with Lu support. On 19 May, the allied forces defeated Qi at Ailing, capturing Guo Shu and many other Qi commanders. Duke Ai sent Guo Shu's head back to Qi in a new and well-decorated box with a note saying:

If Heaven did not recognize the unjust, then for what purpose did it employ the domain below?

Such a note put Qi in the position of injustice and justified the attack of it by Wu and Lu.

=== Return of Confucius to Lu ===
Jisun Fei, seeing Ran Qiu's performance, inquired him about where he learned about military matters. When Ran Qiu mentioned Confucius's name, Jisun Fei considered inviting Confucius back to Lu. In 484 BC, Confucius returned to Lu under Jisun Fei's invitation, ending his fourteen-year long exile.

== Middle reign ==
In spring 483 BC, Jisun Fei implemented a new military requisition policy, which mandated taxation by land holding instead of by district. Confucius opposed such policy, citing that it was incongruent with the convention and norms set by the Duke of Zhou. When Ran You asked for Confucius's comment on Jisun Fei's behalf, Confucius said in private:

The conduct of the noble man takes its measure from ritual propriety. In giving he tends to liberality, in undertaking affairs he upholds moderation, and in collecting taxes he pursues thriftiness. In this way, to requisition by districts is surely satisfactory. If he does not take his measure from ritual propriety but covets without satiety, then even if he taxes according to landholdings, it will still not be satisfactory. What is more, if the nobleman Jisun wishes to act in accordance with standards, then the statutes of the Zhou Duke are at hand. If he prefers to be careless in his actions, then why consult with me?

In spring 482 BC, Duke Ai went to Huangchi (modern-day Fengqiu County, Henan) to participate in a covenant between King Fuchai of Wu and Duke Ding of Jin, the rulers of two of the greatest powers of the time. On 5 June, the covenant was formally made. According to the Guoyu and the Records of the Grand Historian, Wu had the precedence in the ceremonies. According to the Zuo Zhuan, however, Wu yielded precedence to Jin upon hearing the news that its rival state Yue had captured the Wu capital of Gusu.

=== Further conflict with Qi ===
On 23 May, 481 BC, Duke Jian of Qi was murdered by Tian Heng, the head of the Tian clan, which controlled Qi politics. After fasting for three days, Confucius requested Duke Ai to launch a punitive expedition against Qi three times, but Duke Ai refused.

This did not prevent conflict, however. In spring 480 BC, Cheng (郕), the seat of power of the Shusun clan (one of the Three Huan), revolted and defected to Qi. This caused a brief conflict between Lu and Qi that ended in winter of the same year. As a part of the Lu delegation to Qi, Zigong managed to convince Tian Heng to return Cheng to Lu by implying that Lu would turn to Wu for aid should conflict continue.

=== Death of Confucius ===
On 9 March, 479 BC, Confucius died, and Duke Ai delivered a eulogy in his honor. Zigong commented that Duke Ai's non-employment of Confucius while he was alive while eulogizing him after his death was not ritually proper. Furthermore, he noted that Duke Ai used the wording "one man" (一人) while referring to himself, which, too, was not ritually proper, as only the Son of Heaven may do so. Zigong further predicted that Duke Ai would not die in Lu.

== Late reign ==
=== Overture with Yue ===
In summer 474 BC, Lu established diplomatic relations with Yue, a reviving state to the south of Wu lead by King Goujian. This was soon before Yue completed its conquest of Wu on 10 November, 473 BC.

In autumn 472 BC, Duke Ai sent an envoy to Yue for the first time. King Goujian reciprocated this visit by sending an envoy of his own. In late 471 BC, Duke Ai personally visited Yue, befriending Crown Prince Luying, who intended to marry his daughter to Duke Ai and gift him land. When Jisun Fei heard about this, he bribed Luying through Grand Steward Bo Pi, who was serving Yue at this point, and Luying called off the proposal.

=== Further deterioration of relations with the Three Huan ===
The Zuo Zhuan records an episode between Duke Ai and the heads of the Jisun and Mengsun (孟孫) clans that showcases the strained relations between the duke and the Three Huan.

In summer 470 BC, Duke Ai returned to Lu from his visit of Yue. Jisun Fei, the head of the Jisun clan, and Mengsun Zhi, the head of the Mengsun clan, welcomed the duke at Wuwu (五梧), a city to the south of the Lu capital of Qufu. During the welcome feast, Mengsun Zhi insulted Guo Chong (郭重), Duke Ai's chariot driver, by publicly asking why he is fat. Jisun Fei tried to defuse the situation by asking Mengsun Zhi to "punish" himself by drinking some more wine and saying,

Because the domain of Lu is in such close proximity to its enemy, we subjects did not have an opportunity to follow our lord and were able to avoid the long journey. And yet you call Guo Chong fat.

Regardless, Duke Ai retorted,

Because he has had to eat his words so many times, can he help being fat?

This response was simultaneously a play on words, (Note: The expression "to eat one's words" exists verbatim in both Classical Chinese and Modern Chinese as 食言) a play on the given names of Jisun Fei (Note: Fei (肥) literally means "fat") and Mengsun Zhi, (Note: Zhi (彘) literally means "pig".) and a veiled rebuke on the clan leaders for breaking prior promises.

=== Exile and death ===
In autumn 468 BC, Duke Ai attempted to depose the Three Huan and regain authority through the forces of Yue. The plot failed, and Duke Ai sought refuge in the house of Lu official Gongsun Youshan (公孫有山) while the forces of the Three Huan attacked him. Duke Ai was forced into exile in Yue via Wey and Zhu. The Records of the Grand Historian, but not the Zuo Zhuan, records that the people of Lu eventually welcomed Duke Ai back to Lu and that he died in the residence of Gongsun Youshan.

Regardless, after Duke Ai's death, the Three Huan made Prince Ning (寧), Duke Ai's son, the new duke. He would become known as Duke Dao of Lu.

== Historiographical significance ==
The reign of Duke Ai was the last to be recorded in the Spring and Autumn Annals, a historical record of Lu commonly attributed to Confucius as well as one of the Five Classics. Specifically, the final entry of the Spring and Autumn Annals commentaries Gongyang Zhuan and the Guliang Zhuan (as well as their versions of the Spring and Autumn Annals) is about the 14th year of Duke Ai's reign. The Zuo Zhuan, however, recorded the entirety of Duke Ai's reign, ending on its final year, while its version of the Annals ended on the 16th year of Duke Ai's reign (the year of Confucius's death).

== Bibliography ==
- Zuo Zhuan, Duke Ai
- Gongyang Zhuan, Duke Ai
- Shiji, vol. 33, 47
- Book of Rites, vol. 4
- Guoyu, vol. 5
- Durrant, Stephen; Li, Wai-yee; Schaberg, David (2016). Zuo Tradition/Zuozhuan: Commentary on the "Spring and Autumn Annals" (1st ed.). Seattle: University of Washington Press. ISBN 9780295999159.
- Miller, Harry (2015). The Gongyang Commentary on The Spring and Autumn Annals. New York: Palgrave Macmillan US. doi:10.1057/9781137493002. ISBN 978-1-349-50514-2.

Duke Ai of Lu House of Ji Cadet branch of the House of Ji Died: 468 BC
Regnal titles
Preceded by Duke Ding of Lu	Duke of Lu; 494-468 BC	Succeeded by Duke Dao of Lu
