= Duke Kao of Lu =

Duke Kao of Lu 魯考公

Ruler of Lu
- Reign: 997 - 994 BC or 998 – 995 BC
- Predecessor: Bo Qin
- Successor: Duke Yang of Lu
- Died: 994 BC or 995 BC
- Spouse: Unknown
- Issue: None
Names
- Ancestral name: Ji (姬); Given name: Qiu (酋)
Posthumous name
- Duke Kao (考公)
- House: Ji
- Dynasty: Lu
- Father: Bo Qin
- Mother: Unknown

Duke Kao of Lu (died 994 BC or 995 BC), personal name Ji Qiu, was the second duke of the Lu state, a dynastic vassal state of the Zhou dynasty. He was a son of Bo Qin (Duke Tai), the founding duke. Ruling for four years, he was succeeded by his younger brother, Duke Yang. His reign began in either 998 BC or 997 BC, the one-year discrepancy due to the Records of the Grand Historian giving Duke Wu's reign as ten years in one chapter and nine years in another.
