= Duke Cheng of Lu =

Duke Cheng of Lu 魯成公

Ruler of Lu
- Reign: 590 – 20 July 573 BC
- Predecessor: Duke Xuan of Lu
- Successor: Duke Xiang of Lu
- Died: 20 July 573 BC
- Spouse: Qi Jiang (齊姜); Ding Si (定姒)
- Issue: Duke Xiang of Lu; Heng (衡)
Names
- Ancestral name: Ji (姬); Given name: Heigong (黑肱) or Heigu (黑股)
Posthumous name
- Duke Cheng (成公)
- House: Ji
- Dynasty: Lu
- Father: Duke Xuan of Lu
- Mother: Mu Jiang

Duke Cheng of Lu (Chinese: 魯成公; pinyin: Lǔ Chéng Gōng; died 20 July 573 BC), personal name Ji Heigong, was a ruler of the Lu state. A son of Duke Xuan of Lu and Mu Jiang, he reigned for 18 years from 590 BC to 573 BC. He was described as a weak ruler under the influence of his mother.

In 573 BC, Duke Cheng died. His son Wu (午), who was three years old in East Asian reckoning, succeeded him the following year.

== Reign ==
=== War with Qi ===
In 590 BC, the first year of Duke Cheng's reign, the political situation was that the major powers Jin and Chu were fighting for hegemony (though Jin was recently defeated by Chu at Bi in 597 BC), while Lu and its neighbor Qi were aligned to Jin and Chu, respectively. In order to prepare for a potential war against Qi and Chu, a new system was instituted such that each qiu (丘), an administrative unit roughly translatable to "district," must produce an armored soldier. Du Yu noted in his annotations of the Zuo Zhuan that according to the Rites of Zhou, each dian (甸), which contains four qius, should supply three armored soldiers, meaning that this new policy represents an increase in taxation and corvee. The Guliang Zhuan further criticizes that having individual qius provide armored soldiers was improper, as the supply of armored soldiers was an affair of the cities, while qius are agricultural units.

In spring 589 BC, Qi attacked Lu from the north, with Duke Qing of Qi personally leading an army, laying siege to Long (龍). Lupu Jiukui, a favorite of the Duke of Qi, scaled the walls of Lu, but was captured by the defending soldiers. Even though the Duke of Qi plead for his life in exchange of withdrawal from Lu, the defending soldiers executed Lupu Jiukui and hanged his naked body on the city wall. The Duke of Qi, furious, ordered the Qi army to assault the walls of Long, with him personally beat the war drum. Long was taken in three days, and the Qi army advanced further south into Lu.

Wey, an ally of Lu, sent a force to Lu's aid, but was defeated by Qi at Xinzhu (新築). Then, both Wey and Lu went to Xi Ke, a minister of Jin, for aid. Xi Ke and Duke Jing of Jin agreed to aid, and defeated Qi at An. As the war ended in autumn 589 BC, Lu gained some land to the north of the Wen River, which had been a part of Lu at one point.

=== Mid Reign ===
In winter 589 BC, Chu attacked both Wey and Lu. Duke Cheng commanded Minister Zang Xuanshu to sue for peace, but he refused, positing that the Chu army would leave quickly after traveling to Lu from afar, and that going to the Chu army to negotiate for peace would be accepting the credit without merit. However, Zhongsun Mie, Viscount Xian of Meng, another minister, begged to go. He successfully convinced Chu to a peace deal after sending a gift of one hundred each of carpenters, needlewomen, and weavers as well as Prince Gongheng (公衡) as hostage (Prince Gongheng would soon escape from Chu). Then, Duke Cheng swore a covenant with Prince Yingqi of Chu, with multiple representatives from nearby states attending. This covenant was done in secret, as Lu feared reprisal from Jin. For this reason, the Spring and Autumn Annals made no mention of ministers among the list of attendees.

In spring 588 BC, Lu was a part of an expedition against Zheng consisting of Jin, Song, Wey, and Cao to punish Zheng for its constant switching of allegiance between Jin and Chu during the prelude to the Battle of Bi. The allied army was defeated at Qiuyu (丘輿). In fall of the same year, Minister Shusun Qiaoru, Count Xuan of Shusun, entered the land gained in the prior year to establish Lu rule there, but his army met resistance at the city of Ji (棘), forcing him to lay siege to it.

In winter 588 BC, both Jin and Wey sent an envoy to Lu in order to renew their covenants with Lu. When Duke Cheng asked Zang Xuanshu about who should take precedence, he said that even though the Wey envoy had a higher rank, the Jin envoy should take precedence since Jin was the head of the covenant. Therefore, Jin's covenant ceremonies were done a day before those of Wey.

In summer 587 BC, Duke Cheng visited Jin, only to be snubbed by Duke Jing of Jin. Upon his return to Lu, Duke Cheng considered aligning towards Chu. Jisun Xingfu, Viscount Wen of Ji, a Lu minister, said to Duke Cheng,

This will not do. Although Jin goes against the proper way, we cannot yet turn against it. That domain is great, and its ministers are harmonious. It is close to us and the other princes defer to it. We cannot yet switch allegiance. As it says in Scribe Yi’s Records, Those not of the same kith and kin, Their hearts and minds must be different. Although Chu is great, its people are not our kin. Will it be willing to care for us?

Duke Cheng abandoned the idea.

In autumn 585 BC, under the order of Jin, Duke Cheng sent Zhongsun Mie and Shusun Qiaoru to invade Song.

In spring 583 BC, Gong Ji (共姬), Duke Cheng's sister, was betrothed to Duke Gong of Song. She would depart for Song in the next year.

In spring 583 BC, Duke Jing of Jin sent Minister Han Chuan to Lu in order to convince Lu to return the land north of the Wen River, which Qi had ceded to Lu six years prior, back to Qi. Minister Jisun Xingfu entertained Han Chuan. He then said to the envoy privately that "good faith is for realizing dutifulness, dutifulness is for fulfilling commands" and that Jin's vacillation regarding the land north of the Wen River would only break the trust between Jin and the nearby states. Regardless, The cession of land was executed, and dissatisfaction among Jin's allies rose. In the next year, Duke Jing of Jin, fearful, met with leaders of Jin's allied states at Pu (蒲) to renew the alliance. During the meeting, Jisun Xingfu questioned the virtue of the Duke of Jin to Jin Minister Shi Xie, Viscount Wen of Fan, who replied,

To care for other domains assiduously, to treat them leniently, to control them firmly, to invoke bright spirits to deter them, to deal gently with the submissive, and to attack those with divided allegiance—these are the next best things after virtue.

In summer 581 BC, Duke Jing of Jin died. Duke Cheng was the only ruler to attend his funeral. Furthermore, the leaders of Jin, suspicious that Duke Cheng could be leaning towards Chu, detained him. Duke Cheng was forced to make a covenant with Jin before being sent back to Lu. The Spring and Autumn Annals contains no record of either the funeral or Duke Cheng's detainment. The Zuo Zhuan explains that this is because the leaders of Lu, considering the Duke's attendance and detainment a disgrace, decided not to record these events. In the same year, Minister Shusun Qiaoru visited Qi to foster good relations. The relationship between Lu and Qi had been antagonistic since the Battle of An in 589 BC.

In winter 576 BC, Lu established diplomatic relations with Wu at Zhongli.

=== Factional Strife ===
On 6 June 575 BC, Jin and Chu clashed at Battle of Yanling. As Jin acted without consulting its allies such as Qi, Wey, and Lu beforehand, Duke Cheng only set out with the Lu army on the day of the battle. Shusun Qiaoru, who was having a liaison with Mu Jiang, Duke Cheng's mother, sought to eliminate the power of the Jisun and Mengsun clans (the other two clans of the Three Huan). He convinced Mu Jiang to influence Duke Cheng on this matter, and she, on the day Duke Cheng was set to depart for Yanling, urged her son to banish the heads of the Jisun and Mengsun clans. When Duke Cheng made no direct response, Mu Jiang, angry, threatened to depose him and install one of his younger brothers to the Lu throne. Duke Cheng strengthened the defenses of his palace and appointed Zhongsun Mie as the head of the palace guards. Doing so delayed his departure.

In autumn 575 BC, Duke Cheng met with the rulers of Jin, Qi, and Wey as well as representatives from Song and Zhu at Shasui (沙隨) to plan an attack against Zheng (which was aligned to Chu at that time). Shusun Qiaoru had bribed Xi Chou, the Jin officer who hosted the rulers of eastern states, and told him that Duke Cheng departed Lu late to see whether Jin or Chu would win the Battle of Yanling. Xi Chou, convinced, passed on the message to Duke Li of Jin. As a result, the Duke of Jin refused to grant Duke Cheng an audience. As Duke Cheng set out for the expedition against Zheng, Mu Jiang repeated his command to Duke Cheng, whose response was the same as what it was before.

Shusun Qiaoru sent an envoy to Xi Chou, claiming that the Jisun and Mengsun clans intended to align Lu to Chu and Qi. He further requested him to detain and kill Jisun Xingfu, who had been in Duke Cheng's army, while he would take care of Zhongsun Mie in Lu. He further promised further loyalty of Lu to Jin once the plan succeeded. The Jin leaders then arrested Jisun Xingfu.

Duke Cheng, after his return to Lu, sent Prince Yingqi, Count Sheng of Zishu, (Note: Duke Cheng's first cousin; not to be confused with the more distantly-related Prince Yingqi of the Dongmen Clan) to Jin to negotiate Jisun Xingfu's release. During the negotiations, Xi Chou promised Prince Yingqi that after removing Jisun Xingfu and Zhongsun Mie, he would be allowed total control of Lu and enjoy closer relationships to him than even Duke Cheng. Prince Yingqi argued that removing these two men would be tantamount to abandoning Lu to its enemies, who would turn Lu into territories of Jin's enemies. Even after Xi Chou further promised a settlement in Lu, Prince Yingqi refused to change his position. On the other side, the Fan and Luan families of Jin agreed that both Jisun Xingfu and Prince Yingqi were loyal ministers to Lu and, hence, Jin. Soon, Jisun Xingfu was released.

In winter 575 BC, the Lu leadership exiled Shusun Qiaoru, who first fled to Qi and then to Wey. Jisun Xingfu summoned Shusun Bao, a younger brother of Shusun Qiaoru, from Qi and made him the head of the Shusun clan.

=== Late Reign ===
In 574 BC, Lu participated in two more expeditions against Zheng led by Jin. In both cases, Chu sent an army to rescue Zheng, so neither expedition made much gain.

In spring 573 BC, Duke Dao of Jin was installed to the Jin throne after Duke Li of Jin was murdered by Ministers Luan Shu and Xun Yan in the previous year. Duke Cheng visited Jin to pay his respects to Duke Dao of Jin. Later in the same year, Shi Gai, Viscount Xuan of Fan (son of Shi Xie, who died in the prior year), visited Lu as an emissary from Jin to thank Duke Cheng for visiting Jin. In autumn 573 BC, Duke Cheng died. He was succeeded by his son Prince Wu (午), who would be known as Duke Xiang of Lu.

== Bibliography ==
- Zuo Zhuan, Duke Cheng
- Gongyang Zhuan, Duke Cheng
- Shiji, vol. 33
- Durrant, Stephen; Li, Wai-yee; Schaberg, David (2016). Zuo Tradition/Zuozhuan: Commentary on the "Spring and Autumn Annals". Seattle: University of Washington Press. ISBN 978-0-295-99915-9.
- Miller, Harry (2015). The Gongyang Commentary on The Spring and Autumn Annals. New York: Palgrave Macmillan US. doi:10.1057/9781137493002 ISBN 978-1-349-50514-2

Duke Cheng of Lu House of Ji Cadet branch of the House of Ji Died: 573 BC
Regnal titles
Preceded by Duke Xuan of Lu	Duke of Lu; 590-573 BC	Succeeded by Duke Xiang of Lu
