= Duke Wen of Lu (Spring and Autumn period) =

Duke Wen of Lu 魯文公

Ruler of Lu
- Reign: 626 BC - 609 BC
- Predecessor: Duke Xi of Lu
- Successor: Duke Xuan of Lu
- Died: 609 BC
- Spouse: Chu Jiang (出姜); Jing Ying (敬嬴)
- Issue: Prince Wu (惡); Prince Shi (視); Tui (俀), Duke Xuan of Lu; Shu Xi (叔肸)
Names
- Ancestral name: Ji (姬); Given name: Xing (興)
Posthumous name
- Duke Wen (文公)
- House: Ji
- Dynasty: Lu
- Father: Duke Xi of Lu

Duke Wen of Lu (Chinese: 魯文公; pinyin: Lǔ Wén Gōng; died 19 January 609 BC), personal name Ji Xing, was a duke of Lu state, ruling from 626 BC to 609 BC. His father was Duke Xi, whom he succeeded.

In 619 BC, King Xiang of Zhou died. The next year, in 618 BC, Wei, the Count of Mao (毛伯衛), a Zhou official, went to Lu to "request" for tribute. Gongyang Zhuan notes that the Spring and Autumn Annals used such wording as a mockery, pointing out that "kings do not make requests." Also, Zuo Zhuan points out that the late king had not been buried, since the Spring and Autumn Annals made no mention of a king's order. A month after this "request," King Xiang was laid to rest.

In 616 BC, Souman (鄋瞞), a Di tribe, attacked Lu after an invasion of nearby Qi. Duke Wen ordered Shusun Dechen (叔孫得臣), a minister of Lu and a member of the powerful Three Huan clans, to fight the Souman. On 9 September 616 BC, Shusun Decheng defeated the Souman army at Xian (咸), capturing and executing its leader Qiaoru (僑如). Later, Shusun Dechen named one of his sons after Qiaoru.

After Duke Wen of Lu died in 609 BC, his son, Crown Prince Wu (惡), succeeded him, but, only months later, Prince Wu was murdered by Duke Xi's brother Prince Sui (遂; also known as Dongmen Xiangzhong or 東門襄仲), who installed Prince Tui (Duke Xuan), another of Duke Wen's sons.

== Bibliography ==
- Zuo Zhuan, Duke Wen
- Gongyang Zhuan, Duke Wen
- Shiji, vol. 33

Duke Wen of Lu (Spring and Autumn period) House of Ji Cadet branch of the House of Ji Died: 609 BC
Regnal titles
Preceded by Duke Xi of Lu	Duke of Lu; 626-609 BC	Succeeded by Duke Xuan of Lu
