= Ji Xi =

Ji Xi may refer to:

- Duke Yang of Lu (died 988 BC or 989 BC)
- Marquis Mu of Cai (died 646 BC)
- King Lie of Zhou (died 369 BC)
- Xi of Yan (died after 222 BC)

== See also ==
- Jixi, Heilongjiang
- Jixi County, Anhui
