= Duke Xiang of Lu =

Duke Xiang of Lu 魯襄公

Ruler of Lu
- Reign: 572-31 June 542 BC
- Predecessor: Duke Cheng of Lu
- Successor: Ziye
- Died: 31 June 542 BC
- Issue: Ziye; Duke Zhao of Lu; Duke Ding of Lu
Names
- Ancestral name: Ji (姬); Given name: Wu (午)
Posthumous name
- Xiang (襄)
- House: House of Ji
- Father: Duke Cheng of Lu
- Mother: Ding Si (定姒)

Duke Xiang of Lu (Chinese: 魯襄公; pinyin: Lǔ Xiāng Gōng, 575 BC – 31 June 542 BC) was a ruler of the State of Lu during the Spring and Autumn period of ancient China. His ancestral name was Ji (姬), given name Wu (午), and Duke Xiang was his posthumous title.

After Duke Xiang's death, Ziye, his son, succeeded him, but he died only three months later due to "excessive grief." Ziye was succeeded by his brother Chou (稠), who would become known as Duke Zhao of Lu.

== Early life and accession ==
Prince Wu was born to Duke Cheng of Lu and Ding Si (定姒), a concubine, in 575 BC, which was the sixteenth year of his father's reign. The politics of Lu had long been dominated by three cadet branches of the Lu ducal house: Jisun (季孫), Mengsun (孟孫), and Shusun (叔孫), which are collectively called the Three Huan. This situation did not change when Duke Xiang, still a child, succeeded to the Lu throne in 572 BC after his father's death in the prior year.

== Early reign ==
In summer 570 BC, Duke Xiang, then six years old (in East Asian reckoning), visited the Jin court for the first time. When paying respects to Duke Dao of Jin, Duke Xiang knelt and touched his forehead to the ground, a formality reserved for the Son of Heaven. Xun Ying, Viscount Wu of Zhi, a Jin official, commented about this, while Zhongsun Mie, who accompanied Duke Xiang, replied,

Because our humble settlement is on the eastern rim and in close proximity to our enemies, it is to you, my lord, that our unworthy ruler must look. How should he dare not bow with his forehead touching the ground?

Lu remained aligned to Jin throughout Duke Xiang's reign. He would visit Jin four more times: in 569 BC, in 565 BC, in 561 BC, and in 552 BC.

On 28 June, 569 BC, Ding Si died. She was laid to rest on 21 July of the same year.

In winter 569 BC, Duke Xiang visited the Jin court once again. Zhongsun Mie requested that the nearby state of Zeng (鄫; not to be confused with 曾) be "made subordinate to" Lu. When Duke Dao of Jin refused, Zhongsun Mie appealed to Lu's commitment to the alliance and Zeng's failure to provide troops to Jin, claiming Lu's fear of causing offense to Jin should it fail to provide. Duke Dao of Jin was convinced and granted Lu's request. Soon later, nearby states of Zhu and Ju attacked Zeng. Lu official Zang Wuzhong led an army to rescue Zeng, but was defeated at Hutai (狐駘). The Zuo Zhuan notes that the people of the Lu capital mourned the dead by tying their hair with hemp strings, starting a tradition. Ju would fight Lu again in 561 BC, 559 BC, and 558 BC. After swearing a covenant at Duyang (督揚), Lu and Ju would not fight again during Duke Xiang's reign. However, hostilities would resume in 538 BC.

In summer 568 BC, Shusun Bao, Viscount Mu of Shusun presented Crown Prince Wu (巫) of Zeng to Jin in order to formalize Lu's subjugation of Zeng. However, Ju conquered Zeng in 567 BC, while Lu did not intervene. The precise reason was not recorded in history, but it was recorded that Zeng "was relying on bribery for protection." Jin sent an envoy to Lu, demanding an explanation of Lu's failure to defend Zeng. Jisun Su, Viscount Wu of Jisun went to the Jin court to provide such explanation. In the same year, Shusun Bao visited Zhu to improve relations between Lu and Zhu, with the Zeng dispute becoming a moot point. However, Lu and Zeng had another border conflict in 565 BC.

In summer 566 BC, the Jisun clan fortified its settlement Bi (費).

In winter 564 BC, Lu, represented by an army led by Jisun Su as well as Duke Xiang himself, participated in another coalition led by Jin, this time attacking Zheng, which quickly sued for peace. The leaders of Jin decided to accept the peace deal and swear a covenant with Zheng in order to lure Chu, which Zheng was aligned to, into attacking Zheng. Then, the coalition forces would be able to fight the Chu army, which would be tired out, with fresh forces. The peace deal was finalized on 11 October, 564 BC, with Zheng switching its allegiance to Jin. However, after the deal was finalized, Zheng managed to reinterpret the wording of the peace terms from complete submission to Jin to one conditional to Jin's policies. The Jin coalition, with its strategic goals unfulfilled, attacked Zheng again soon after, but then withdrew. Zheng then quickly switched its allegiance back to Chu.

It was soon after the Zheng campaign when Duke Xiang, aged twelve, completed his capping ceremony, signifying that he became an adult. Protocol required that the ceremony be conducted at the ducal house's familial temple. As he was away from Lu, Duke Xiang used the temple dedicated to Duke Cheng of Wey, which was on his way back to Lu.

=== Intervention of Song Factional Dispute ===
In autumn 576 BC, Duke Gong of Song died. Dang Ze, Song's Master of the Horses of the Huan (桓) lineage, (Note: Descendents of Duke Huan of Song) murdered Crown Prince Fei (肥), while Minister of the Right Hua Yuan of the Dai (戴) lineage (Note: Descendents of Duke Dai of Song.) attempted to flee to Jin. However, by the banks of the Yellow River, Hua Yuan was personally stopped by Minister of the Left Yu Shi (魚石), another member of the Huan lineage, who feared that Hua Yuan might annihilate the entire Huan lineage should he return with an army and believed that he would kill only Dang Ze should he stay. Yu Shi predicted correctly, but all five ministers of the Huan lineage, including himself, fled to Chu, Hua Yuan's request to stay notwithstanding. Hua Yuan then made Prince Cheng (成), a younger son of Duke Gong, the Duke of Song. Prince Cheng would become known as Duke Ping of Song.

In summer 573 BC, Chu and Zheng attached Song, seizing Pengcheng and sending the five exiled ministers there. As efforts to retake Pengcheng faltered due to continued Chu reinforcements, Hua Yuan went to Jin for help. Although a Jin army sent to Song to keep Chu power in check defeated a Chu army at the Valley of Mijiao (靡角之谷), further military campaign was necessary. It was at this point that Jin sent an envoy to Lu for aid, which Lu agreed to give.

In spring 572 BC, a Lu army led by Zhongsun Mie, Viscount Xian of Meng joined a coalition force led by Jin Minister Luan Yan, Viscount Huan of Luan to attack Pengcheng. The siege was successful, with Jin capturing the five Song ministers and bringing them back to Jin.

== Middle reign ==
In spring 563 BC, Lu joined a Jin coalition against a small state named Biyang (偪陽; in present-day Zaozhuang, Shandong). The siege on the Biyang capital began on 7 March. As a ruse, the Biyang soldiers opened the city gates to let some of the coalition troops into the city, hoping to trap some of them inside. However, a man in the coalition army named Shuliang He held the gate up. As another ruse, the Biyang soldiers hang a long strip of cloth over the wall to lure the besieging soldiers to climb up and cut the cloth right before they scale the walls. Qin Jinfu (秦堇父), a retainer of the Mengsun clan, climbed onto the cloth. The Biyang soldiers cut the cloth, and Qin Jinfu fell. When the Biyang soldiers repeated this ruse, Qin Jinfu climbed the cloth again. That act was done two more times before the Biyang soldiers stopped hanging cloth down the wall. On 30 May, the coalition troops assaulted the city, which fell four days later, on 3 June. Jin first offered Biyang to Song Minister Xiang Xu, who declined on account of potentially rousing the ire of the other Song leaders. Biyang was given to Duke Ping of Song instead.

In summer 563 BC, Zheng, trying to gain favor from Chu, attacked Song, Wey, and Lu in quick succession. Jin then gathered its coalition and attacked Zheng in retaliation. A Chu force entered Zheng to rescue it, and Jin, not wanting to fight Chu, withdrew.

In spring 562 BC, Jisun Su expanded the Lu military from two armies to three armies, with each army controlled by each of the Three Huan. He also proposed that each of the clans would tax resources to support each of their own armies, agreeing to swear an oath regarding this matter.

In summer 560 BC, Shi (邿), a neighboring state, fell into disorder and split into three factions. Lu took this opportunity to conquer Shi.

In summer 559 BC, Shusun Bao led a Lu contingent to join a Jin coalition force invading Qin, which was in retaliation against a Qin invasion in 562 BC. Indecisiveness and disputes among Jin's leadership and its allies prevented any achievements, however.

== Late reign ==
=== Continued fighting against neighbors ===
In summer 558 BC, Qi, which ceased to be a Jin ally due to a diplomatic dispute in the previous year, besieged the Lu city of Cheng (成). This siege would last for more than a year until Zhongsun Su, Viscount Zhuang of Meng broke the siege. In the fall of 558 BC, Zhu and Ju attacked Lu. Duke Dao of Jin had planned to host a meeting to chastise them, but the meeting failed to materialize due to his illness and death soon later. In the next year, Duke Ping of Jin, his successor, had the rulers of Zhu and Ju arrested for their aggression against Lu and their alignment with Qi and Chu. Regardless, both Zhu and Qi attacked Lu once again in late 557 BC. A further Qi attack in autumn 556 BC was defeated at the Battle of Pingyin by a coalition army led by Jin.

Duke Dao of Zhu, after his predecessor's release and death, invaded Lu in 556 BC. As a response, Jin arrested him during a meeting in 554 BC. Jin then arbitrated that the land west of the Kuo River (漷水) belong to Lu. Hostilities did not cease, however: further conflicts occurred in 553 BC.

=== The exile of Zang Wuzhong ===
In 550 BC, both the Jisun and the Mengsun clans had their designated heirs changed to a younger son. In particular, Jisun Su replaced Gongchu with Jisun He with the aid of Zang Wuzhong (臧武仲), a Lu politician and the head of the Zangsun (臧孫) clan. Then, Gongchu aided Zhongsun Jie, a younger son of Zhongsun Su and the future Count Xiao of Mengsun, to become his heir, replacing Mengsun Zhi. After Zhongsun Su's death and Zhongsun Jie's becoming of the head of the Mengsun clan, he, unfriendly with Zang Wuzhong, forced him into exile on the pretext that he was not allowing Zhongsun Su to be properly buried.

Zang Wuzhong first went to Zhu. He, himself a younger son of his father, sent Zang Jia, his elder brother born to a different mother, a turtle to petition the Lu court to make him the next head of the Zangsun clan. Zang Jia then sent the turtle to Zang Wei, his younger brother of the same mother to submit the petition on his behalf, but Zang Wei used it to petition the succession for himself. Zang Wuzhong acquiesced to the status quo, and then fled to Qi. Confucius later commented,

It is indeed difficult to be wise. For someone with Zang Wuzhong’s wisdom to find no place in Lu, there should yet be a reason. What he did went against the right order, and in his dealings with others he did not show empathy.

=== The Covenant of Armistice ===
In 546 BC, Shusun Bao went to Song to represent Lu in the Covenant of Armistice, which stipulated that the tributaries of Jin must also pay tribute to Chu and vice versa. Jisun He had asked Shusun Bao to classify Lu as a subordinate state of a greater power to exempt Lu from the terms of the covenant, but Shusun Bao refused to do so. After the armistice, war and fighting between states decreased.

In spring 544 BC, Duke Xiang visited Chu. During this visit, the leaders of Chu demanded that Duke Xiang dress the body of the late King Kang of Chu with burial garments. Duke Xiang was troubled by this humiliation, but Shusun Bao advised that he could conduct a ceremony of exorcising the funeral chamber first, which would make the dressing appear like sending gifts during court visits. Duke Xiang accepted the advise and did just that; the Chu leaders did not stop the Duke and only realized the meaning and intent after the fact.

== Death and succession ==
Duke Xiang died in a palace he built in the Chu style in 542 BC. After his death, Ziye, his son, succeeded him, but he died only three months later due to "excessive grief." Ziye was succeeded by his brother Chou (稠), who would become known as Duke Zhao of Lu.

== Bibliography ==
- Zuo Zhuan, Duke Cheng, Duke Xiang
- Gongyang Zhuan, Duke Cheng
- Shiji, vol. 33
- Durrant, Stephen; Li, Wai-yee; Schaberg, David (2016). Zuo Tradition/Zuozhuan: Commentary on the "Spring and Autumn Annals". Seattle: University of Washington Press. ISBN 978-0-295-99915-9.
- Miller, Harry (2015). The Gongyang Commentary on The Spring and Autumn Annals. New York: Palgrave Macmillan US.

Duke Xiang of Lu House of Ji Cadet branch of the House of Ji Born: 575 BC Died: 31 June 542 BC
Regnal titles
Preceded by Duke Cheng of Lu	Duke of Lu; 590-573 BC	Succeeded by Ziye
