= Duke Xuan of Lu =

Duke Xuan of Lu 魯宣公

Ruler of Lu
- Reign: 608 BC – 26 September 591 BC
- Predecessor: Duke Wen of Lu
- Successor: Duke Cheng of Lu
- Died: 26 September 591 BC
- Spouse: Mu Jiang
- Issue: Heigong (黑肱), Duke Cheng of Lu; Prince Yan (偃); Prince Chu (鉏); Bo Ji (伯姬)
Names
- Ancestral name: Ji (姬); Given name: Tui (俀)
Posthumous name
- Duke Xuan (宣公)
- House: Ji
- Dynasty: Lu
- Father: Duke Wen of Lu
- Mother: Jing Ying (敬嬴)

Duke Xuan of Lu (Chinese: 魯宣公; pinyin: Lǔ Xuān Gōng; died 26 September 591 BC), personal name Ji Tui, was a duke of the Lu state, reigning from 608 BC to 591 BC. He succeeded his father, Duke Wen, to the Lu throne. After Duke Xuan died in 591 BC, his son, Prince Heigong (Duke Cheng), succeeded him.

Starting from Duke Xuan, the Dukes of Lu lost control of their own domain as cadet branches of the ducal house such as the Three Huan seized control of administrative and military affairs.

== Reign ==
=== Succession ===
Prince Tui was born to Duke Wen of Lu and Jing Ying (敬嬴), one of his concubines. Though his mother was a favorite of the Duke, Prince Tui was not the crown prince due to his mother being a concubine. Instead, it was Prince Wu (惡) who poised to succeed Duke Wen, which occurred upon his death in 609 BC.

Prince Sui, Duke Wen's uncle and minister, had opposed Prince Wu's accession to the throne, and, having "private dealings" with Jing Ying, sought to replace Prince Wu with Prince Tui. Facing opposition from Minister Shuzhong Pengsheng (叔仲彭生), Prince Sui solicited support from Duke Hui of Qi, who, having recently succeeded to the throne himself and wanting Lu as an ally, agreed to help.

Months later, Prince Sui established Prince Tui as the Duke of Lu, having killed Prince Wu and Prince Shi (視), his brothers.

=== Later Reign ===
In 608 BC, Qi seized Lu's land west of the Ji River, which Lu had gained in 629 BC during the reign of Duke Xi, as payment for supporting Duke Xuan. The same piece of land was returned to Lu in 599 BC. Zuo Zhuan noted that it is "because of our submission," having also mentioned that Duke Xuan had visited Qi four times during the intervening decade.

In 602 BC, Duke Xuan met with the rulers of Jin, Song, Wey, Zheng, and Cao at Heirang (黑壤). The relationship between Jin and Lu had been strained: When Duke Cheng of Jin succeeded to the throne in 606 BC, Duke Xuan had neither visited him nor sent an envoy. In fact, Duke Cheng of Jin detained Duke Xuan at the meeting, but Duke Xuan escaped by offering bribes. This meeting had actually been a covenant, but the Spring and Autumn Annals made no mention of the covenant, noting this episode as a "meeting." Zuo Zhuan noted that this was done to "conceal our lord's disgrace."

In 594 BC, Lu began to levy an acreage tax. Gongyang Zhuan commentated that, for the first time, the land tax, which had been fixed at ten percent, began to be levied by the size of the land.Zuo Zhuan claims that "the [tax] was a way to increase wealth."

In 591 BC, Prince Guifu (歸父), son of Prince Sui and therefore a member of the Dongmen clan, plotted with Duke Xuan to depose the powerful Three Huan (Note: Zuo Zhuan's mentioning of the Three Huan by name in this year's entry is chronologically the first.) in order to reestablish ducal authority. In the autumn of that year, Prince Guifu visited Jin to seek military support. In the winter of the same year, however, Duke Xuan died. Marquis Wen of Ji (季文子), a member of Jisun (季孫) clan and therefore a part of the Three Huan, expelled Prince Guifu, who fled to Qi.

== Bibliography ==
- Zuo Zhuan, Duke Wen, Duke Xuan
- Gongyang Zhuan, Duke Xuan
- Shiji, vol. 33

Duke Xuan of Lu House of Ji Cadet branch of the House of Ji Died: 591 BC
Regnal titles
Preceded by Duke Wen of Lu	Duke of Lu; 608-591 BC	Succeeded by Duke Cheng of Lu
