= King You =

King You may refer to:

- King You of Zhou (795–771 BC), last ruler of Western Zhou
- King You of Chu (died 228 BC), king of Chu during the Warring States period

== See also ==
- Duke You (disambiguation)
