= Guoyu (book) =

Ancient Chinese text

- Language: Classical Chinese
- Subject: History of Spring and Autumn period states
- Publication date: 4th century BC
- Publication place: China

Chinese name
- Traditional Chinese: 國語
- Simplified Chinese: 国语
- Literal meaning: state discourses
Transcriptions
Standard Mandarin
- Hanyu Pinyin: Guóyǔ
- Wade–Giles: Kuo-yü
- IPA: [kwǒ.ỳ]
Yue: Cantonese
- Yale Romanization: Gwok-yúh
- Jyutping: Gwok3-jyu5
- IPA: [kʷɔk̚˧.jy˩˧]
Southern Min
- Tâi-lô: Kok-gí
Middle Chinese
- Middle Chinese: Kwok-ngjó
Old Chinese
- Baxter–Sagart (2014): *[C.q]ˤʷək ŋ(r)aʔ

The Guoyu, usually translated as Discourses of the States, is an ancient Chinese text that consists of a collection of speeches attributed to rulers and other men from the Spring and Autumn period (771–476 BC). It comprises a total of 240 speeches, ranging from the reign of King Mu of Zhou (r. 956–918 BC) to the execution of the Jin minister Zhibo in 453 BC. Compilation of the Guoyu probably began during the 5th century and continued until the late 4th century BC. The earliest chapter of the compilation is the Discourses of Zhou.

The text's author is unknown, but it is sometimes attributed to Zuo Qiuming, a contemporary of Confucius; although as early as Jin dynasty, Fu Xuan objected to that attribution of authorship.

== Contents ==
The texts compiled within Guoyu comprise the period, people, and events seen in the Spring and Autumn Annals, particularly one of its commentaries, the Zuo Zhuan by Zuo Qiuming. Thus, during the end of the Han dynasty, it was called the preface of the Zuo Zhuan. Scholars like Xu Gan mention it in their work (in this case, the Zhōnglùn 中論 "Balanced Discourses"), though the tradition has since died out.

The text comprises eight books covering the Zhou court and seven of the feudal states, divided into 21 chapters:

No.	Chinese	Pinyin	Translation	Chapters
1	周語	Zhōu Yǔ	Discourses of Zhou	3
2	魯語	Lǔ Yǔ	Discourses of Lu	2
3	齊語	Qí Yǔ	Discourses of Qi	1
4	晉語	Jìn Yǔ	Discourses of Jin	9
5	鄭語	Zhèng Yǔ	Discourses of Zheng	1
6	楚語	Chǔ Yǔ	Discourses of Chu	2
7	吳語	Wú Yǔ	Discourses of Wu	1
8	越語	Yuè Yǔ	Discourses of Yue	2
