= Duke Yi of Lu =

Duke Yi of Lu 魯懿公

Ruler of Lu
- Reign: 816–807 BC
- Predecessor: Duke Wu of Lu
- Successor: Boyu (伯御)
- Died: 807 BC
- Issue: Prince Cheng (公子稱)
Names
- Ancestral name: Ji (姬); Given name: Xi (戲)
Posthumous name
- Duke Yi (懿公)
- House: Ji
- Dynasty: Lu
- Father: Duke Wu of Lu

Duke Yi of Lu, personal name Ji Xi, was a ruler of the Lu state, succeeding his father Duke Wu.

Despite being the younger son of Duke Wu, he was made heir apparent over his older brother Kuo by the intervention of King Xuan of Zhou. After nine years of rule, supporters of Kuo and of his son Boyu rose in revolt and murdered Duke Yi; Boyu was then proclaimed to be the Duke of Lu by the rebels.
