= Duke Yang of Lu =

Duke Yang of Lu 魯煬公

Ruler of Lu
- Reign: 993 - 988 BC or 994 – 989 BC
- Predecessor: Duke Kao of Lu
- Successor: Duke You of Lu
- Died: 988 BC or 989 BC
- Spouse: Unknown
- Issue: Duke You of Lu; Duke Wei of Lu
Names
- Ancestral name: Ji (姬); Given name: Xi (熙)
Posthumous name
- Duke Yang (煬公)
- House: Ji
- Dynasty: Lu
- Father: Bo Qin
- Mother: Unknown

Duke Yang of Lu (died 988 BC or 989 BC), personal name Ji Xi, was the third ruler of the Lu state, a dynastic vassal state of the Zhou dynasty. He was a son of Bo Qin (Duke Tai), the first duke, and succeeded his brother, Duke Kao. He died after reigning for six years, and was succeeded by his son, Duke You.
