= Duke Xi of Lu =

Duke Xi of Lu 魯僖公

Ruler of Lu
- Reign: 659 BC – 17 November 627 BC
- Predecessor: Duke Min of Lu
- Successor: Duke Wen of Lu
- Spouse: Unknown
Names
- Ancestral name: Ji (姬); Given name: Shen (申)
Posthumous name
- Duke Xi (僖公)
- House: Ji
- Dynasty: Lu
- Father: Duke Zhuang of Lu
- Mother: Cheng Feng (成風)

Duke Xi of Lu (Chinese: 魯僖公; pinyin: Lǔ Xī Gōng; died 17 November 627 BC), personal name Ji Shen, was a ruler of Lu state, reigning from 659 BC to 627 BC. His father was Duke Zhuang. After Duke Xi died in 627 BC, his son, Duke Wen, succeeded him to the throne. Among the rulers of Lu whose reigns were recorded in the Zuo Zhuan, Duke Xi's reign was the longest.

== Reign ==
=== Succession ===
Prince Shen, who would become known as Duke Xi of Lu, was a son of Duke Zhuang of Lu and Cheng Feng (成風), one of his concubines hailing from the nearby state of Xugou (須句). After the death of his father in 662 BC, two of his brothers, Ziban and Duke Min, had consecutively succeeded him, but both were murdered by Prince Qingfu (慶父), one Duke Zhuang's brothers, who had designs on the Lu throne. Prince You (友), another of Duke Zhuang's brothers, fled to the state of Zhu after Duke Min's murder, brought Prince Shen with him.

The people of Lu, angered by Prince Qingfu's repeated regicide, forced him out of Lu. Prince Qingfu then sought refuge in the nearby state of Ju. It was after this that Prince You returned to Lu with Prince Shen and installed him to the throne. Soon after, Prince You paid Ju for the return of Prince Qingfu. On his way back to Lu, after he reached a place named Mi (密), Prince Qingfu sent Prince Yu (魚), a kinsman, to seek clemency. Prince Yu was unsuccessful, and he returned to Prince Qingfu crying aloud. Prince Qingfu hanged himself after hearing Prince Yu's crying.

Shu Jiang (叔姜), Duke Min's mother, had supported Prince Qingfu's plot. For this, she fled to Zhu after Prince Qingfu's fall. However, the leaders of the nearby state of Qi captured her, killed her, and brought her body back to Qi. Later, Prince Xi successfully requested that they give the body back to him to bury.

=== Later Reign ===
In the spring of 656 BC, Duke Xi invaded Cai along with the states of Qi, Song, Chen, Wey, Zheng, Xu, and Cao. After Cai was defeated, the armies of these states attacked Chu, which soon sought peace. In the winter of the same year, a Lu army led by Prince Zi (茲) attacked Chen together with forces from Qi, Song, Wey, Zheng, Xu, and Cao.

In 655 BC, Duke Xi met with the rulers of Song, Chen, Wey, Xu, and Cao as well as the Crown Prince Zheng of Zhou at Shouzhi (首止) in an effort to support him over Prince Dai (帶), who their father, King Hui of Zhou, preferred as heir. The Duke of Zheng was slated to attend, but he reneged the alliance. The next year, in 654 BC, the alliance attacked Zheng for the betrayal. Chu, then an ally of Zheng, laid siege to Xu, forcing the allied army to retreat. Regardless, Crown Prince Zheng remained the crown prince and succeeded his father upon his death in 651 BC, whereas Prince Dai, who rebelled in 636 BC, was killed by Duke Wen of Jin in the following year.

In 643 BC, Duke Huan of Qi, one of the Five Hegemons, died, triggering a war of succession among six of his sons. After two months of initial infighting, Prince Wukui emerged from the chaos and succeeded the throne of Qi, while Crown Prince Zhao fled to the state of Song. Three months after this, in 642 BC, Duke Xiang of Song, in a bid to install Crown Prince Zhao to the Qi throne, invaded Qi along with forces from Cao, Wey, and Zhu. Duke Xi, meanwhile, sent a force to Qi in support of Wukui, but Wukui was killed by the people of Qi, who feared the allied forces. Eventually, Duke Xiang of Song and his allies defeated all opposition and made Crown Prince Zhao (Duke Xiao of Qi) the new duke.

In 639 BC, the state of Zhu conquered Xuqu, the ruler of which sought refuge in Lu. Cheng Feng, Duke Xi's mother, convinced him to restore the state of Xuqu, her origin. The next spring, Duke Xi personally lead an army and attacked Zhu, restoring Xuqu. Duke Xi, looking down upon Zhu due to its size, took no defensive precautions. Zang Wenzhong (臧文仲), one of his officials, warned:

Even for the former kings, with their bright virtue, there was nothing they did not consider difficult, nothing they did not fear. How much more should our small domain be vigilant! Pray do not, my lord, say Zhu is small. If wasps and scorpions carry poison, how much more does a domain!

The Duke did not heed his advice, and was defeated by the Zhu army at Shengxing (升陘) on 20 July 638 BC. The Zhu army captured the Duke's helmet and suspended it upon Zhu's city gate.

In 634 BC, Duke Xiao of Qi attacked Lu. Duke Xi sent a man named Zhan Xi (展喜) to Duke Xiao in order to sue for peace. When asked by Duke Xiao whether the people of Lu were afraid of him, Zhan Xi answered to the contrary. He first recalled a covenant that King Cheng of Zhou bestowed to Jiang Ziya, founder of Qi, and the Duke of Zhou, father of Bo Qin, the founder of Lu, for their loyalty and importance to Zhou, ordering that their descendants must not quarrel. Then, Zhan Xi extolled efforts of Duke Huan of Qi to support the Zhou monarchy through alliances with lesser domains and expeditions against domains deemed to be rebelling against the order. Finally, Zhan Xi reminded Duke Xiao that the people of Lu trusted that he, the successor of Duke Huan, would not abandon the role of hegemon by attacking Lu, and were, therefore, not afraid of a Qi invasion. The Duke of Qi called off the attack upon hearing these words. Then, Duke Xi sent Prince Sui (遂, a brother of Duke Xi; also known as Dongmen Xiangzhong or 東門襄仲) and Zang Wenzhong to Chu to ask for support, claiming that Qi had not submitted to Chu. This plea was successful: Duke Xi successfully attacked Qi with Chu troops, taking the city of Gu (穀).

In the spring of 633 BC, the Duke of Qǐ (杞, not to be confused with the previously mentioned 齊) visited the Lu court. He used "the ritual of the [barbarians]," and Duke Xi took offense. That autumn, Lu attacked Qǐ for this incident.

In 629 BC, Duke Wen of Jin gave Lu a piece of territory between the Tao and Ji Rivers, which, according to the Gongyang Zhuan, he forced Duke Gong of Cao, whom he had captured in war three years prior, to give up. Prince Sui was sent to Jin as an envoy to give thanks to Duke Wen.

In 627 BC, Lu attacked Zhu twice. The first attack, in the summer, was personally led by Duke Xi. Zhu was taken off guard, allowing Duke Xi to take a city named Zilou (訾婁) and avenge the defeat at Shengxing twelve years prior. The second attack, in the autumn, was led by Prince Sui. Later that year, Duke Xi died and was succeeded by his son Prince Xing (興), who would become known as Duke Wen of Lu.

== See also ==
- Lu (state)
- Zuo Zhuan

== Bibliography ==
- Zuo Zhuan, Duke Min, Duke Xi
- Gongyang Zhuan, Duke Min, Duke Xi
- Shiji, vol. 4, 32, 33
