= Duke Wu of Lu =

Duke Wu of Lu 魯武公

Ruler of Lu
- Reign: 825–816 BC
- Predecessor: Duke Shen of Lu
- Successor: Duke Yi of Lu
- Died: 816 BC
- Spouse: Unknown
- Issue: Crown Prince Kuo (太子括); Duke Yi of Lu; Duke Xiao of Lu
Names
- Ancestral name: Ji (姬); Given name: Ao (敖)
Posthumous name
- Duke Wu (武公)
- House: Ji
- Dynasty: Lu
- Father: Duke Xian of Lu
- Mother: Unknown

Duke Wu of Lu, personal name Ji Ao, was a duke of the Lu state. He succeeded his brother, Duke Shen.

In spring of the ninth year of his reign, he paid a visit to King Xuan of Zhou with his heir apparent Kuo and younger son, Xi. King Xuan appreciated Xi greatly, and despite the objections of his councillor Zhongshan Fu (仲山甫), he decided to intervene and appoint Xi as the heir apparent over his elder brother. In summer, the three returned to Lu, and Duke Wu died shortly after.
