= Duke You of Lu =

Duke You of Lu 魯幽公

Ruler of Lu
- Reign: 987 - 974 BC or 988 – 975 BC
- Predecessor: Duke Yang of Lu
- Successor: Duke Wei of Lu (魯魏公)
- Died: 974 BC or 975 BC
- Spouse: Unknown
- Issue: None
Names
- Ancestral name: Ji (姬); Given name: Zai (宰)
Posthumous name
- Duke You (幽公)
- House: Ji
- Dynasty: Lu
- Father: Duke Yang of Lu
- Mother: Unknown

Duke You of Lu (died 974 BC or 975 BC), personal name Ji Zai (姬宰) or Yi (懌), was the fourth ruler of the Lu state, reigning for a total of 14 years. He inherited the duchy from his father, Duke Yang.

According to Records of the Grand Historian, he was murdered by his younger brother Ji Fei (Duke Wei) who then took over the duchy.
