= Zuo Qiuming =

Chinese historian

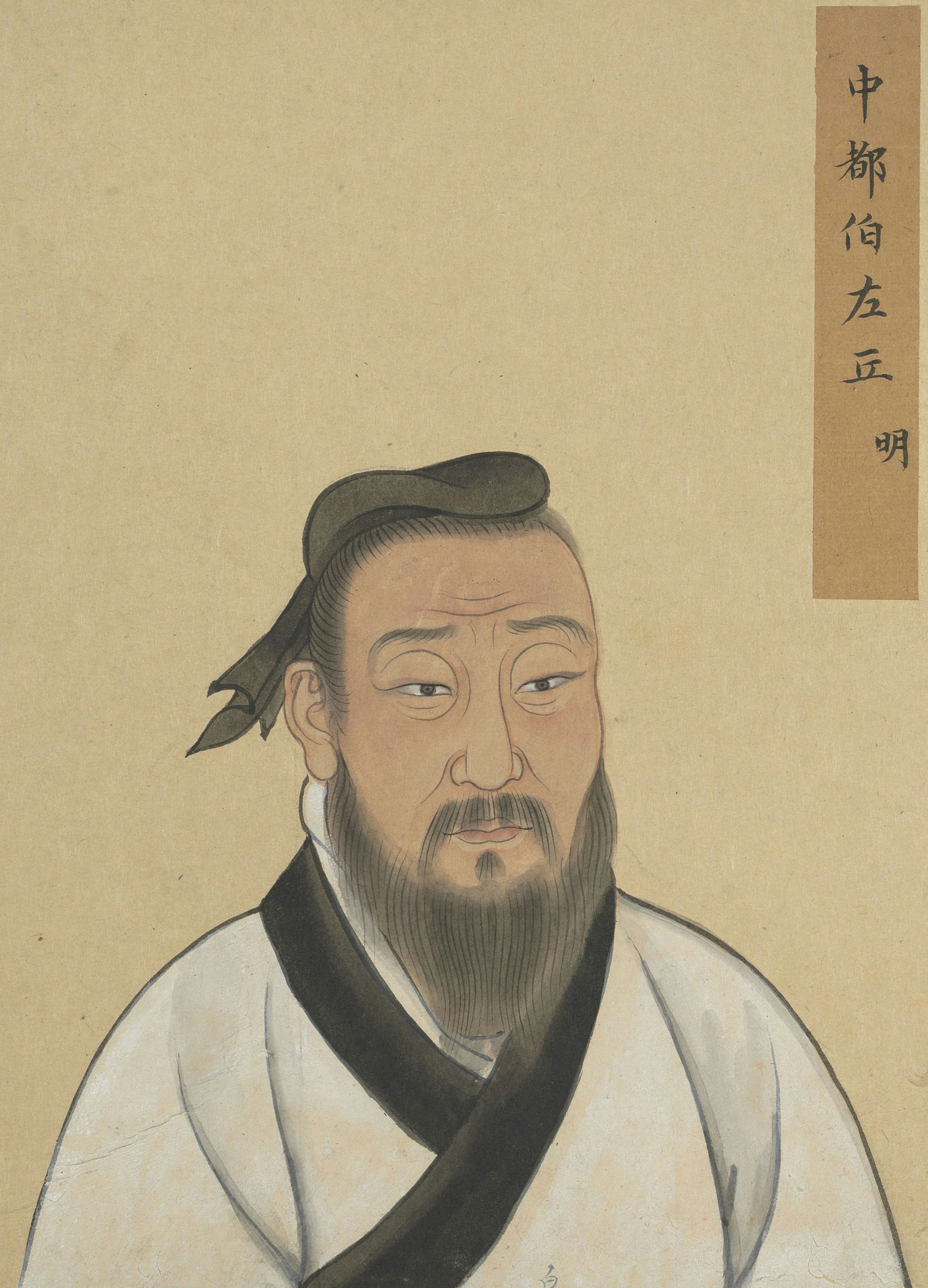
- Years active: 556 – 451 BC or; 502 – 422 BC
- Notable work: Zuo Zhuan

Zuo Qiuming
- Chinese: 左丘明
Transcriptions
Standard Mandarin
- Hanyu Pinyin: Zuǒ Qiūmíng; Zuǒqiū Míng
- Wade–Giles: Tso Ch'iu-ming; Tso-ch'iu Ming

Zuo Qiuming, Zuoqiu Ming or Qiu Ming (Note: The earliest extant mention of Zuo Zhuan is in Sima Qian's Records of the Grand Historian, where the narrative is named 左氏春秋 Zuǒshì Chūnqiū "Master Zuo's Spring and Autumn"; thus suggesting that the narrator's lineage surname (氏 shì) was 左 Zuǒ. Zhu Yizun 朱彝尊 (1629–1709) thought that the narrative's author bore a double-character surname 左丘 Zuǒqīu; Yu Zhengxie 俞正燮 (1775–1840) thought his surname is 丘 Qīu, while zuŏ 左 "was the designation of his office", short for zuǒshǐ 左史 "scribe to the left".) (556 – 451 BCE or 502 – 422 BCE) was a Chinese historian who was a contemporary of Confucius. He lived in the Lu state during the Spring and Autumn period. He was a historian, litterateur, thinker and essayist who worked as a Lu official.

The influential historical narrative Zuo Zhuan ("Commentary of Zuo") is traditionally attributed to him; as well as Guoyu ("Discourses of the States"). One tradition, according to the Records of the Grand Historian, holds that he was blind.

In the Analects, Confucius complimented Zuo Qiu Ming's moral stance and conduct; he also received praise for his academic contributions.

== Ideology ==
The basic philosophical outlook of Zuo Zhuan, attributed to Zuo Qiu Ming, is strongly Confucian in nature. The Zuo Zhuan's overarching theme is that haughty, evil, and stupid people generally bring disaster upon themselves, while those who are good, wise, and humble are usually justly rewarded. The Confucian principle of "ritual propriety" or "ceremony" (lǐ 禮) is seen as governing all actions, including war, and to bring bad consequences if transgressed. However, the observance of li is never shown as guaranteeing victory, and the Zuo Zhuan includes many examples of the good and innocent suffering senseless violence. Much of the Zuo Zhuan′s status as a literary masterpiece stems from its "relentlessly realistic portrayal of a turbulent era marked by violence, political strife, intrigues, and moral laxity".

The narratives of the Zuo Zhuan are highly didactic in nature, and are presented in such a way that they teach and illustrate moral principles. Unlike the Histories of Herodotus or the History of the Peloponnesian War of Thucydides, with which it is roughly contemporary, the Zuo Zhuan′s narration always remains in the third person perspective, and presents as a dispassionate recorder of facts. The German Sinologist Martin Kern observed: "Instead of offering authorial judgments or catechistic hermeneutics, the Zuo Zhuan lets its moral lessons unfold within the narrative itself, teaching at once history and historical judgment."

For instance, here Zuo Zhuan instructed how a 君子; jūnzǐ; 'noble man', 'gentleman', 'superior person' should behave.

Jing / Spring and Autumn Annals
冬，黑肱以濫來奔。
In winter, Heigong, bringing Lan with him, came in flight.

Zhuan / Zuo
冬，邾黑肱以濫來奔。賤而書名，重地故也。君子曰：「名之不可不慎也如是：夫有所有名而不如其已。以地叛，雖賤，必書地，以名其人，終為不義，弗可滅已。是故君子動則思禮，行則思義；不為利回，不為義疚。或求名而不得，或欲蓋而名章，懲不義也。……」
In winter, Heigong of Zhu, bringing Lan with him, came in flight. Although he was lowly, his name was written so as to show the importance of the land. The noble man said, "This is why one must be careful about names. Under certain circumstances it is better not to have fame. This man committed treason, bringing land with him, and though he was lowly, the land had to be recorded in writing. Thus, the man himself was named. In the end, his undutifulness could not be erased. Thus, the noble man ponders on ritual propriety whenever he acts and ponders on dutifulness whenever he moves. He does not deviate for the sake of profit and does not incur blame in matters of dutifulness. Some seek a name and do not achieve it, while others wish to hide their names but see them made public. That is the punishment for a failure of duty. [...]"

— Duke Zhao's 31st year (511 BC) (Durrant, Li, and Schaberg, trans.)

== Publications ==
Zuo Zhuan and Guoyu were both attributed to Zuo Qiuming.

=== Zuo Zhuan ===
Zuo Zhuan is the earliest detailed and vividly narrated chronological history of China. At the same time, it is also a historical narrative with the highest literary quality. ("我国古代最早而又详细完备，叙事生动的编年史，同时也是文学成就很高的历史散文著作。")

=== Guo Yu ===
Sima Qian first proposed that Zuo Qiuming was the author of Guoyu. Tang scholar Yan Shigu, while annotating Book of Han, also attributed Guoyu's authorship to Zuo Qiu Ming. Later, other scholars doubted it and had different opinions on who is the author of Guo Yu, one example is Fu Xuan, who first raised the counterview that Zuo Qiuming isn't the author of Zuo Zhuan.

Guo Yu's compilation method is based on the classification of countries, in Chinese Guo; taking language, in Chinese Yu as the core, hence receives the name Guo Yu. ("它的编纂方法是以国分类，以语为主，故名'国语'.") Guo Yu is the first Chinese history book in national style. ("国语是第一部国别体史书。")

== Historical evaluations ==
Yuezheng Zichun, a disciple of Confucius's disciple Zengzi, praised Zuo Qiu Ming as a gentleman, Sima Qian honored Zuo Qiu Ming as the gentleman of Lu.

Zuo Qiu Ming is regarded as "the ancestor of hundreds of characters, the ancestor of ancient literature". ("百家文字之宗、万世古文之祖")

== Sources ==
- Wang, John C. Y. (1986). "Tso-chuan 左傳". In Nienhauser, William H. (ed.). The Indiana Companion to Traditional Chinese Literature. Bloomington: Indiana University Press. pp. 804–806. ISBN 0-253-32983-3.
