= Bo Qin =

Duke Tai of Lu 魯太公
- Ruler of State of Lu
- Reign: 1043–998 BC
- Born: 1068 BC
- Died: 998 BC
- Issue: Duke Kao of Lu; Duke Yang of Lu
Posthumous name
- Duke Tai (太公)
- House: Ji
- Dynasty: Lu
- Father: Duke of Zhou
- Military career
- Allegiance: Western Zhou
- Conflicts: Rebellion of the Three Guards

Bo Qin (Chinese: 伯禽; pinyin: Bóqín), also known as Qin Fu (禽父), also known by his posthumous name as the Duke Tai of Lu (魯太公), was the founder of the Lu state, a dynastic vassal state of the Zhou dynasty.

Born into the royal Ji family, he was the eldest son of Dan, the Duke of Zhou. Instead of inheriting his father's estate in Zhou, he was granted the newly established State of Lu centered at Qufu. He is thought to have ruled Lu from around 1042 to 997 BC.

He was succeeded first by his son Duke Kao and then by Duke Yang, another of his sons.

The main line of the Duke of Zhou's descendants came from Bo Qin's third son Yu (魚), whose descendants adopted the surname Dongye (東野). The Duke of Zhou's offspring held the title of Wujing Boshi (五經博士).

Bo Qin was the ancestor of Mencius through Qingfu (慶父), a son of Duke Huan of Lu, who was, in turn, a descendant of Bo Qin. The genealogy is found in the Mencius family tree (孟子世家大宗世系).
