= Lu (state) =

Zhou dynasty vassal state (c.1042 – 249 BC)

Lu 魯
- c. 1042 BC–249 BC
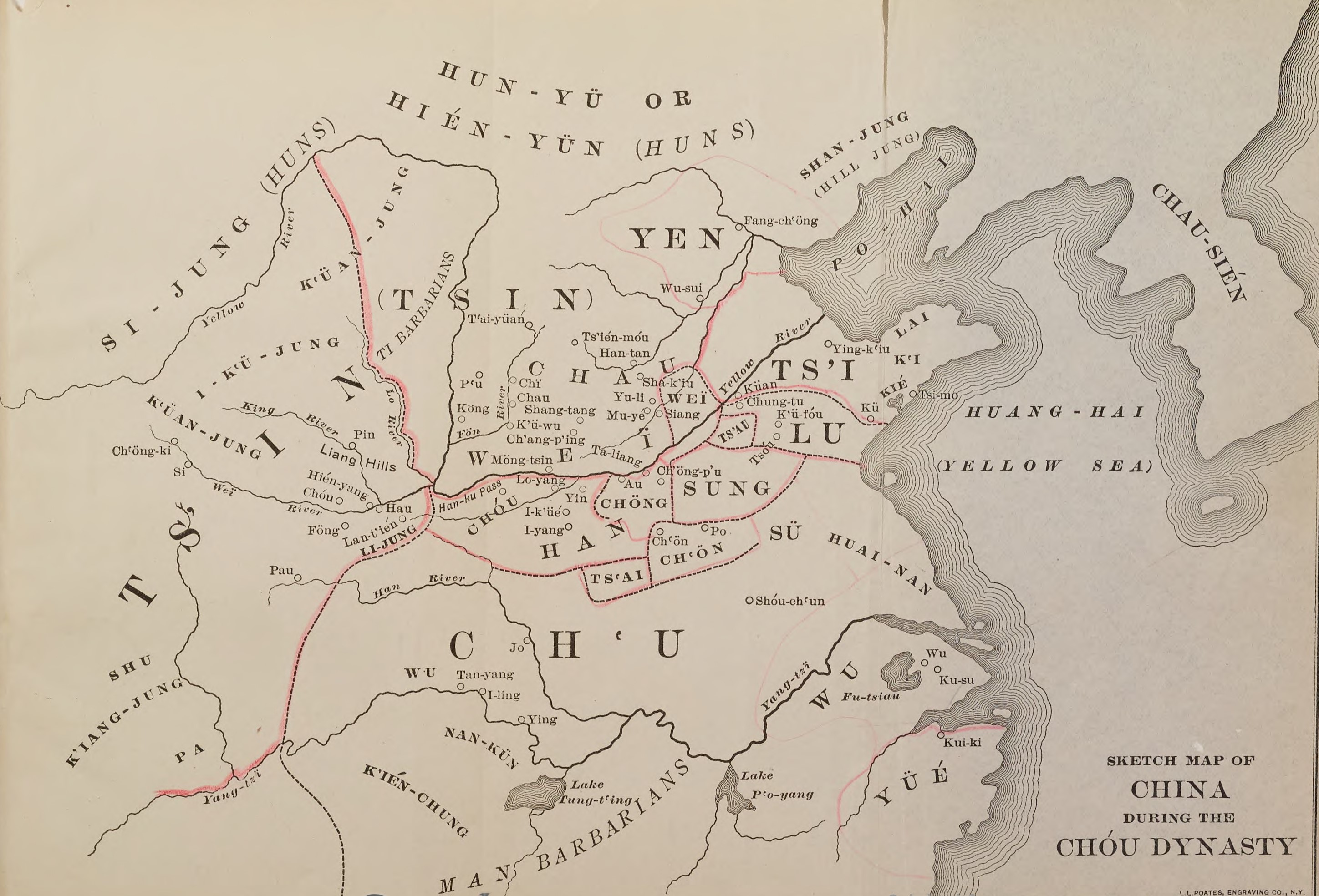
- Lu was the state in the northeast, near Shandong Peninsula
- Capital: 1. Lushan (today Lushan); 2. City of Yan (today Qufu); 3. Qufu (today Qufu)
- Religion: Chinese folk religion, ancestor worship, Taoism
- Government: Monarchy
- Marquis, then Duke
- History
  - Established: c. 1042 BC
  - Annexed by Chu: 249 BC
- ISO 3166 code: LU

Lu
- "Lu" in seal script (top), traditional (middle), and simplified (bottom) characters
- Traditional Chinese: 魯
- Simplified Chinese: 鲁
Transcriptions
Standard Mandarin
- Hanyu Pinyin: Lǔ
- Wade–Giles: Lu^{3}
- IPA: [lù]
Wu
- Suzhounese: Lou
Yue: Cantonese
- Yale Romanization: Lóuh
- Jyutping: Lou5
- IPA: [lɔw˩˧]
Southern Min
- Tâi-lô: Lóo
Middle Chinese
- Middle Chinese: /luo^{X}/
Old Chinese
- Baxter–Sagart (2014): *r.ŋˤaʔ
- Zhengzhang: *raːʔ

Lu (Chinese: 魯; c. 1042 – 249 BC) was a vassal state during the Zhou dynasty of ancient China located around modern southwest Shandong. Founded in the 11th century BC, its rulers were from a cadet branch of the House of Ji (姬) that ruled the Zhou dynasty. The first duke was Boqin, a son of the Duke of Zhou, who was brother of King Wu of Zhou and regent to King Cheng of Zhou.

Lu was the home state of Confucius as well as Mozi, and, as such, has an outsized cultural influence among the states of the Eastern Zhou and in history. The Annals of Spring and Autumn, for instance, was written with the Lu rulers' years as their basis. Another great work of Chinese history, the Zuo Zhuan or Commentary of Zuo, was traditionally considered to have been written in Lu by Zuo Qiuming.

== Geography ==
The state's capital was in Qufu and its territory mainly covered the central and southwest regions of what is now Shandong Province. It was bordered to the north by the powerful state of Qi and to the south by the powerful state of Chu. The position of Lu on the eastern frontiers of the Western Zhou state, facing the non-Zhou peoples in states such as Lai and Xu, was an important consideration in its foundation.

== Etymology ==
William H. Baxter (apud Matisoff, 1995) suggests a semantic connection between the toponym 魯 Lǔ and its homophone 鹵 lǔ "salty, rock salt" (< OC *C-rāʔ) since that region was a salt marsh in ancient times.

== History ==
Lu was one of several states founded in eastern China at the very beginning of the Zhou dynasty, in order to extend Zhou rule far from its capital at Zongzhou and power base in the Guanzhong region. Throughout Western Zhou times, it played an important role in stabilising Zhou control in modern-day Shandong.

During the early Spring and Autumn period, Lu was one of the strongest states and a rival of Qi to its north. Under Duke Yin and Duke Huan of Lu, Lu defeated both Qi and Song on several occasions. At the same time, it undertook expeditions against other minor states.

This changed by the middle of the period, as Lu's main rival, Qi, grew increasingly dominant. Although a Qi invasion was defeated in the Battle of Changshao in 684 BC, Lu would never regain the upper hand against its neighbour. Meanwhile, the power of the dukes of Lu was eventually undermined by the powerful feudal clans of Jisun (季孫), Mengsun (孟孫), and Shusun 叔孫 (called the Three Huan because they were descendants of Duke Huan of Lu). The domination of the Three Huan was such that Duke Zhao of Lu, in attempting to regain power, was exiled by them and never returned. It would not be until Duke Mu of Lu's reign, in the early Warring States period, that power eventually returned to the dukes again.

In 249 BC King Kaolie of the state of Chu invaded and annexed Lu. Duke Qing, the last ruler of Lu, became a commoner.

The main line of the Duke of Zhou's descendants came from his firstborn son, the State of Lu ruler Bo Qin's third son Yu (魚) whose descendants adopted the surname Dongye (東野). The Duke of Zhou's offspring held the title of Wujing Boshi (五經博士).

Mencius was a descendent of Qingfu (慶父), one of Duke Huan of Lu's sons. The genealogy is found in the Mencius family tree (孟子世家大宗世系).

== Rulers ==
The Chinese Plain, 5th century BC

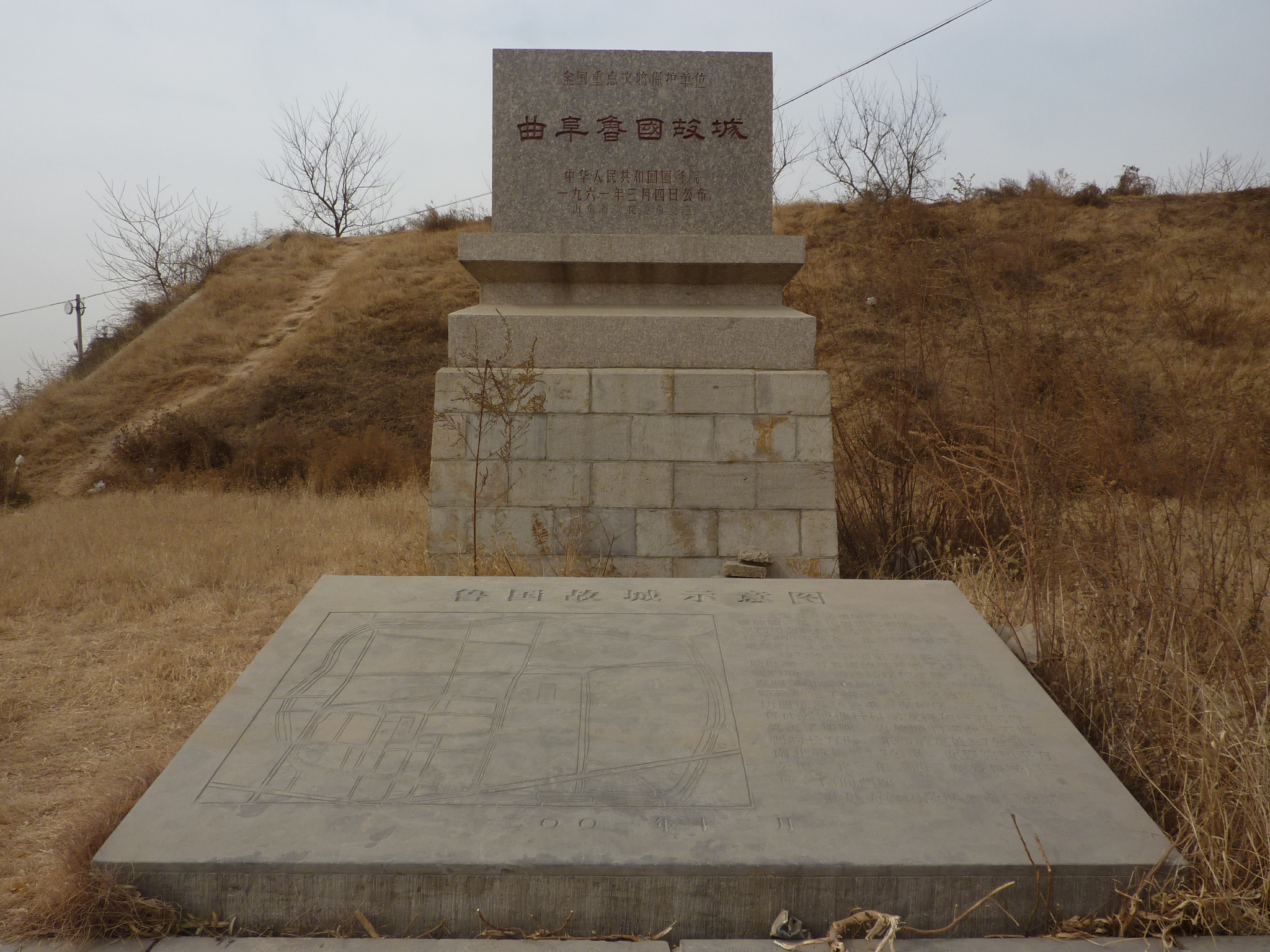
A remnant of the city wall of Lu's capital city, surviving on the outskirts of Qufu

List of Lu rulers based on the Records of the Grand Historian by Sima Qian:

Title	Given name	Reign	Relationship
Duke Tai	Boqin	c. 1042–997 BC	son of Duke of Zhou
Duke Kao	You	998–995 BC	son of Boqin
Duke Yang	Xi or Yi	994–989 BC	brother of Duke Kao
Duke You	Zai or Yu	988–975 BC	son of Duke Yang
Duke Wei	Fei	974–925 BC	brother of Duke You
Duke Li	Zhuo or Di	924–888 BC	son of Duke Wei
Duke Xian	Ju	887–856 BC	brother of Duke Li
Duke Shen	Bi or Zhi	855–826 BC	son of Duke Xian
Duke Wu	Ao	825–816 BC	brother of Duke Shen
Duke Yi	Xi	815–807 BC	son of Duke Wu
none	Boyu	806–796 BC	nephew of Duke Yi
Duke Xiao	Cheng	795–769 BC	brother of Duke Yi
Duke Hui	Fuhuang or Fusheng	768–723 BC	son of Duke Xiao
Duke Yin	Xigu	722–712 BC	son of Duke Hui
Duke Huan	Yun or Gui	711–694 BC	brother of Duke Yin
Duke Zhuang	Tong	693–662 BC	son of Duke Huan
Ziban	Ban	662 BC	son of Duke Zhuang
Duke Min	Qi	661–660 BC	son of Duke Zhuang
Duke Xi	Shen	659–627 BC	son of Duke Zhuang
Duke Wen I	Xing	626–609 BC	son of Duke Xi
Duke Xuan	Tui or Wo	608–591 BC	son of Duke Wen I
Duke Cheng	Heigong	590–573 BC	son of Duke Xuan
Duke Xiang	Wu	572–542 BC	son of Duke Cheng
Ziye	Ye	542 BC	son of Duke Xiang
Duke Zhao	Chou	541–510 BC	son of Duke Xiang
Duke Ding	Song	509–495 BC	brother of Duke Zhao
Duke Ai	Jiang	494–467 BC	son of Duke Ding
Duke Dao	Ning	466–429 BC	son of Duke Ai
Duke Yuan	Jia	428–408 BC	son of Duke Dao
Duke Mu	Xian	407–377 BC	son of Duke Yuan
Duke Gong	Fen	376–353 BC	son of Duke Mu
Duke Kang	Tun	352–344 BC	son of Duke Gong
Duke Jing	Yan	343–323 BC	son of Duke Kang
Duke Ping	Shu	322–303 BC	son of Duke Jing
Duke Wen II	Jia	302–278 BC	son of Duke Ping
Duke Qing	Chou	277–249 BC	son of Duke Wen II

=== Rulers family tree ===
Lu state

Three Huan
Duke of Zhou 周公旦
Bo Qin 伯禽
Duke Kao 魯考公	Duke Yang 魯煬公
Duke You 魯幽公	Duke Wei 魯魏公
Duke Li 魯厲公	Duke Xian 魯獻公
Duke Zhen 魯真公 ?-855-825BC	Duke Wu 魯武公 ?-825-816BC
括	Duke Yi 魯懿公 ?-816-807BC	Duke Xiao 魯孝公 ?-796-769BC
Bo Yu 伯御 ?-807-796BC	Duke Hui 魯惠公 ?-769-723BC	公子益師 衆氏 ?-722BC	公子展 展氏	郈惠伯 郈氏	公子彄 臧孫氏 ?-718BC
Duke Yin 魯隱公 ?-723-712BC	Duke Huan 魯桓公 ?-712-694BC	施父 施氏
Qingfu 慶父 孟孫氏 ?-660BC	Duke Zhuang 魯莊公; 706-694-662BC	Shuya 叔牙 叔孫氏 ?-662BC	Jiyou 季友 季孫氏 ?-644BC
Zi Ban 子般 ?-662BC	Duke Xi 魯僖公 ?-660-627BC	Duke Min 魯閔公; 670-662-660BC	公子遂 東門氏 ?-601BC
Duke Wen 魯文公 ?-627-609BC
惡 ?-609BC	視 ?-609BC	Duke Xuan 魯宣公 ?-609-591BC	叔肹 子叔氏 ?-592BC
Duke Cheng 魯成公 ?-591-573BC	公子偃 ?-575BC	公子鉏
Duke Xiang 魯襄公; 575-573-542BC	公衡
Zi Ye 子野 ?-542BC	Duke Zhao 魯昭公; 560-542-510BC	Duke Ding 魯定公 ?-510-495BC
公衍	公為 ?-484	公果	公賁	Duke Ai 魯哀公 ?-495-468BC
Duke Dao 魯悼公 ?-468-437BC	公子荊	孺子𪏆
Duke Yuan 魯元公 ?-437-416BC
Duke Mu 魯穆公 ?-416-383BC
Duke Gong 魯共公 ?-383-353BC
Duke Kang 魯康公 ?-353-344BC
Duke Jing 魯景公 ?-344-323BC
Duke Ping 魯平公 ?-323-303BC
Duke Wen 魯文公 ?-303-280BC
Duke Qing 魯頃公 ?-280-256-249BC

== See also ==
- Lu Commandery
- Qilu culture
