= Three Huan =

Three aristocratic clans dominating the ancient state of Lu

The Three Huan (Chinese: 三桓; pinyin: Sān Huán) refers to three Chinese aristocratic clans, all descendants of Duke Huan of Lu, in the State of Lu, which dominated the government affairs, displacing the power of the dukes, for nearly three centuries during the Spring and Autumn period. They are the Jisun (季孫) or Ji, Mengsun (孟孫) or Meng, and Shusun (叔孫) clans.

== Etymology ==
The characters Bo (伯), Meng (孟), Zhong (仲), Shu (叔), and Ji (季) are originally ordinals used in courtesy names to indicate a person's rank among his or her siblings of the same gender who survived to adulthood. The eldest brother's courtesy name would be prefixed with the word "Bo" (or "Meng" if he was born to a secondary wife), the second with "Zhong", the youngest with "Ji", and the rest with "Shu". For instance, Confucius's courtesy name was Zhongni (仲尼).

As the power of the Three Huan became hereditary, the descendants of Duke Zhuang's brothers used the ordinal numbers as family names to distinguish their branches of the House of Ji.

== History ==
The three houses were cadet branches of the Lu ducal house, which was itself a branch of the royal house of the Zhou dynasty. Duke Huan of Lu (r. 711–694 BC) had four sons. While the oldest son by his main wife Wen Jiang became his heir, and subsequently Duke Zhuang of Lu, his other three sons—respectively Qingfu (慶父), Shuya (叔牙) and Jiyou (季友) all became important officials during the reign of Duke Zhuang, and gained substantial power in the state.

Their influence would come to undermine the power of the ducal house owing to the succession issue of Duke Zhuang. The duke, who was seriously ill, wanted his son Ziban to succeed; Shuya advocated the succession of Qingfu, but was then poisoned by Jiyou, who supported Ziban. Under Jiyou's protection, Ziban became the Duke, but he was shortly murdered by Qingfu in collaboration with Duke Zhuang's wife. Jiyou was exiled from Lu, and Duke Min of Lu, Ziban's brother, was installed to the throne.

In 660 BC, Qingfu murdered Duke Min as well and sought to rule himself as the Duke of Lu; in the face of public outcry, however, he was forced to flee to the state of Ju. Jiyou then returned from his exile in the state of Qi with Duke Min's younger brother, who then ruled as Duke Xi of Lu; while Qingfu was forced to commit suicide, Jiyou became the chief minister of Lu, a post that he held for 16 years and which was secured with the backing of the powerful state of Qi.

Competition between the three families became the reason of a major skirmish during the time of Confucius. Ran Yong, Ran Qiu, and Zilu, three of his disciples, were ministers of Jisun, and Confucius himself was a subordinate of Ji Huanzi, the chancellor of Duke Ding of Lu. Lu was almost annihilated by rebels, and Confucius allegedly took part in weakening of the three families and strengthening of the ruler's position, but was ousted from Lu in 497 BCE, going on an exile until 484 BCE.

At the end of the Spring and Autumn period, Duke Ai of Lu, who had no control of Lu's own army, secretly negotiated with Yue for the powerful neighbour to invade Lu, depose the Three Huan, and restore power to the duke. However, the plot was discovered, and Duke Ai was forced to flee abroad. He was succeeded by his son Duke Dao, who continued to be a puppet of the Three Huan.
