= Bing Sheng =

- DVD cover art
- Also known as: The Ultimate Master of War; Military Sage; Sun Tzu
- 兵圣
- Genre: Historical drama
- Written by: Gao Dayong; Lang Xuefeng; Kang Feng; Ma Shuai; Liu Dongyue
- Directed by: Wu Chia-tai; Zhao Jian; Qi Jian
- Presented by: Wang Zhongjun
- Starring: Zhu Yawen; Li Tai; Hu Jing; Zhao Yi; He Zhuoyan; Xu Huanhuan; Tu Men; Wu Ma
- Country of origin: China
- Original language: Mandarin
- No. of episodes: 40

Production
- Executive producer: Song Yaping
- Producers: Zhang Jizhong; Wong Zhonglei; Ge Weidong; Wang Zhongjun
- Production location: China
- Running time: ≈45 minutes per episode

Original release
- Network: Changde TV
- Release: 2009 – 2009

Bing Sheng (兵圣; "Military Sage") is a 2008 Chinese historical television series produced by Zhang Jizhong, starring Zhu Yawen, Li Tai, Hu Jing, Zhao Yi, He Zhuoyan, Xu Huanhuan, Tu Men and Wu Ma. Loosely based on the life of Sun Tzu, the author of The Art of War, the series was first broadcast on Changde TV in 2009.

== Synopsis ==
During the Spring and Autumn period of ancient China, the four great clans in the Qi state compete among themselves to gain a dominant position in politics. Despite the animosity between their respective fathers, Sun Wu and Guo Wujiu develop a close friendship. Both of them are tutored in military strategy by the renowned general Tian Rangju.

Meanwhile in the Chu state, Wu Zixu becomes a fugitive after his father is wrongly accused of treason and his entire family is exterminated by the incompetent King Ping of Chu. Wu Zixu settles in the Wu state with help from Sun Wu and Wujiu.

Tragically, the political rivalry among the four great clans in Qi deteriorates to the point of armed conflict. The Sun clan launches a surprise attack on the Guo and Gao clans and massacres them. Wujiu escapes from Qi and has since regarded Sun Wu as his sworn enemy.

While Wujiu settles in the Chu state and becomes a general, Sun Wu also leaves Qi and wanders around until he finally settles in the Wu state. Through Wu Zixu, Sun Wu is introduced to King Helü of Wu, who puts him in charge of the Wu army.

Sun Wu begins his military career by writing The Art of War and leading Wu forces to victory in battles against rival states.

== Cast ==
- Zhu Yawen as Sun Wu
- Li Tai as Guo Wujiu
- Hu Jing as Gao Zisu
- He Zhuoyan as Guo Moli
- Rocky Hou as Gao Jue
- Zhao Yi as Wu Zixu
- Wang Weiguo as King Liao of Wu
- Tu Men as King Helü of Wu
- Zhang Songwen as King Fuchai of Wu
- Lin Peng as Bo Pi
- Chen Jiming as En Bo
- Han Dong as Jing Chai
- Xu Huanhuan as Zhai Qian
- Zhao Bin as King Goujian of Yue
- Zhao Xiaoxiao as Fan Li
- Cao Peng as Wen Zhong
- Li Zefeng as King Zhao of Chu
- Tan Feiling as Shen Baoxu
- Wu Ma as Yan Ying
- Yang Niansheng as Sun Ping
- Jiang Hualin as Sun Shu
- Li Jichang as Yue Ping
- Wu Ting as Lady Hu
