= Battle of Boju =

Battle between the Chinese kingdoms of Wu and Chu (506 BC)

- Part of Wu-Chu War
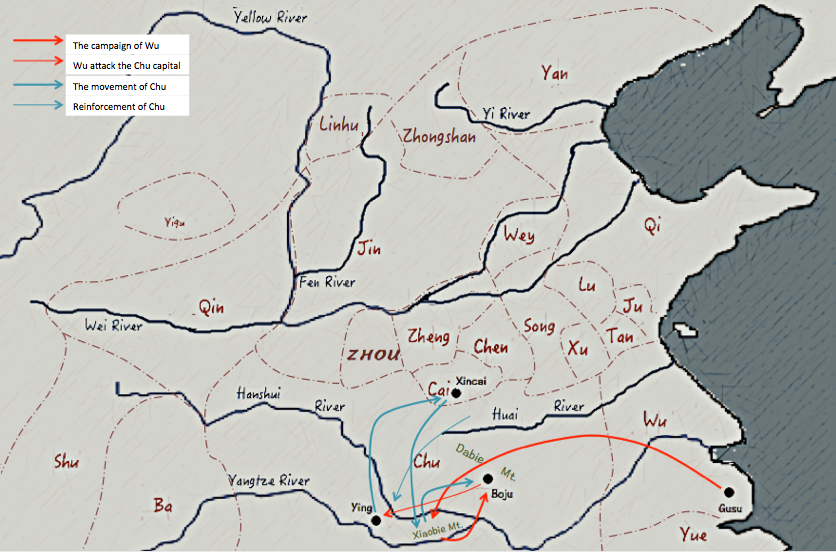
- Battle of Boju
Date	506 BC
Location	Boju, State of Chu (present-day Macheng, Hubei Province)
Result	Wu victory

Belligerents
Wu; Cai; Tang	Chu

Commanders and leaders
King Helü; Fugai; Wu Zixu; Sun Tzu	Nang Wa; Shen Yin Shu

Strength
30,000–33,000	200,000–300,000

Casualties and losses
Unknown (relatively minor)	Almost entire army killed or captured

The Battle of Boju (Chinese: 柏舉之戰) was the decisive battle of the war fought in 506 BC between Wu and Chu, two major kingdoms during the Spring and Autumn period of ancient China. The Wu forces were led by King Helü, his brother Fugai, and Chu exile Wu Zixu. According to Sima Qian's Shiji, Sun Tzu, the author of The Art of War, was the main commander of the Wu army, but he was not mentioned in the Zuo Zhuan and other earlier historical texts. The Chu forces were led by Lingyin (prime minister) Nang Wa (also known as Zichang) and Sima (chief military commander) Shen Yin Shu. The Wu were victorious, and they captured and destroyed the Chu capital, Ying.

== Background ==
Wu was originally a minor state east of Chu, which was a major power of the Spring and Autumn period and was frequently at war with the state of Jin, the other major power north of Chu. In order to check Chu's expansion, Jin made an alliance with Wu, trained the Wu army, and taught them to use chariots. Wu gradually grew stronger, and in 584 BC defeated Chu for the first time and annexed the Chu city of Zhoulai. In the following 70 years Chu and Wu fought ten wars, with Wu winning most of them.

During the reign of King Ping of Chu, the corrupt official Fei Wuji induced the king to marry the bride of Crown Prince Jian. Fearing the revenge of the prince when he would become king, Fei preemptively persuaded King Ping to exile Prince Jian and kill his advisor Wu She along with his son Wu Shang. Wu She's second son Wu Zixu escaped to the state of Wu and vowed revenge. Fei Wuji was later executed by Nang Wa and Shen Yin Shu.

In the kingdom of Wu, Wu Zixu became a trusted advisor of Prince Guang and helped him assassinate his cousin King Liao of Wu. Prince Guang ascended the throne and was known as King Helü of Wu.

== Beginning of the Wu-Chu War ==

Zuo Zhuan, one of the earliest Chinese works of narrative history compiled in the 4th century BC, gives a detailed account of the battle and the larger war.

In 506 BC, during the reign of King Zhao of Chu, King Helü decided to invade Chu. The king personally led the army, along with his younger brother Fugai and Wu Zixu. Wu was joined by the minor states of Cai and Tang, whose monarchs had been held as prisoners by Chu prime minister Nang Wa. The Wu army sailed up the Huai River and then left their ships and marched to the east bank of the Han River. In response, Nang Wa and chief military commander Shen Yin Shu led the Chu army to the west bank of the Han, across the river from the invaders.

Shen Yin Shu devised a plan in which Nang Wa would take up defensive positions with the main army along the Han River, while Shen would go north to Fangcheng on Chu's northern frontier, and lead the troops stationed there to destroy the Wu ships left on the Huai River as well as block the three key passes on the Wu army's return route. Nang Wa would then cross the Han River and the two forces would simultaneously attack the Wu army from both the front and the back. Nang accepted the plan, and Shen departed for Fangcheng.

After Shen's departure, however, the historiographer Shi Huang (史皇) said to Nang Wa that the people of Chu hated Nang and loved Shen Yin Shu, and that if he followed Shen's plan then Shen would take all the credit for the victory and Nang would be doomed. Nang had a change of heart and decided to cross the river and attack right away.

The two armies fought three battles between the Xiaobie (southeast of present-day Hanchuan) and Dabie Mountains and the Wu forces were victorious. Convinced that he could not win, Nang Wa wanted to flee but was dissuaded by Shi Huang.

On the 19th day of the 11th month (Chinese calendar), the two armies were drawn up at Boju. Fugai asked King Helü for permission to attack, saying that Nang Wa was cruel and his soldiers had no will to fight, and that if he attacked the Chu soldiers were sure to flee. King Helü denied his request, but Fugai decided to disobey the king and attack anyway with his own force of 5,000 men. As he predicted, the Chu soldiers fled and the Chu army was routed. Shi Huang was killed in the battle and Nang Wa escaped to the state of Zheng.

Fugai then pursued the Chu army to Qingfa River, waited until half of them had crossed the river, and then attacked and defeated them again. Later, the Wu army caught up with the Chu soldiers when they were having their meal. The Chu soldiers fled, and the Wu troops ate their food, resumed the pursuit, and defeated them again at Yongshi River (雍澨, present-day Sima River in Jingshan County). After winning five battles, the Wu army reached Ying, the capital of Chu. King Zhao of Chu escaped first to Yun, and then to the state of Sui, and the Wu army captured Ying.

Shen Yin Shu had by now returned and defeated the Wu forces at Yongshi, but he was wounded three times in as many battles. Not wanting to be captured alive, he ordered officer Wu Goubi to kill him and bring his head home.

== Aftermath ==
After the fall of Ying, Shen Baoxu, an official of Chu and a former friend of Wu Zixu, went to the State of Qin to plead for assistance. At first the Qin ruler Duke Ai refused to help, but after Shen spent seven days crying in the palace courtyard, Duke Ai was moved by his devotion and agreed to send troops to assist Chu.

In 505 BC, the Qin and Chu armies jointly defeated Wu in several battles. In September, Fugai returned to Wu and declared himself king. King Helü was therefore forced to return and defeated Fugai, who fled and sought refuge in Chu. King Zhao of Chu then returned to the capital Ying.

== Legacy ==
Historian Fan Wenlan considers the Battle of Boju and the Wu-Chu War the first large-scale war of the Eastern Zhou dynasty. Chu, one of the most powerful states in the Spring and Autumn period, would not regain its former strength for some time and Wu reached the zenith of its power. However, Wu was unable to hold on to its territorial gains and its strength would not last for long. In 473 BC, only three decades after it almost conquered the Kingdom of Chu, the Kingdom of Wu itself would be conquered by the rising power of Yue to its south.

The battle is largely attributed to the famous Chinese general Sun Tzu. In the Art of War it was said that Sun Tzu led the forces of Wu during the battle. However, there are no records of his participation in the battle. The Zuozhuan, the primary source of the battle, does not mention Sun Tzu at all.
