= Fei Wuji =

Official of Chinese State of Chu (died 515 BCE)

Fei Wuji (Chinese: 費無極 or 費無忌; died 515 BCE) was a corrupt official of the state of Chu during the reign of King Ping whose persecution of Crown Prince Jian and the family of Wu Zixu led to the defeat and decline of Chu.

== Life and death ==
According to Lüshi Chunqiu, a Chinese classic text compiled around 239 BCE, Fei was the junior teacher of the crown prince Jian, and when a princess of the State of Qin was betrothed to Prince Jian, Fei was entrusted with the task of escorting the princess to Chu. However, when Fei saw that the princess was beautiful he induced King Ping to take the princess as his own queen and find another wife for the crown prince. Fearing the revenge of Prince Jian when he became king, Fei then preemptively persuaded the king to kill Prince Jian and his senior teacher Wu She along with his son Wu Shang. Prince Jian managed to escape abroad, and Wu She's second son Wu Zixu escaped to the state of Wu and vowed to avenge the deaths of his father and brother. Fei Wuji then framed another official Xi Wan (郤宛) and tricked Prime Minister Nang Wa into killing him. Shen Yin Shu, the chief military commander of Chu, pointed out Nang's mistake and persuaded him to execute the hated Fei Wuji.

== Aftermath ==
In the kingdom of Wu, Wu Zixu became a trusted advisor of Prince Guang and helped him assassinate his cousin King Liao of Wu. Prince Guang ascended the throne and was known as King Helü of Wu. In 506 BCE, Wu Zixu persuaded King Helü to invade Chu. The Wu army routed the Chu army commanded by Nang Wa in the historic Battle of Boju and captured and destroyed the Chu capital Ying. Both Nang Wa and King Zhao of Chu fled, and Shen Yin Shu died in battle. Chu, one of the most powerful states (Five Hegemons) in the Spring and Autumn period, would never regain its former strength. Fei Wuji's persecution of Prince Jian and Wu She directly contributed to the decline of Chu and he is remembered as one of the most prominent villains in Chinese history.
