= Duke Ai of Qin =

Ruler of Chinese state of Qin from 536 to 501 BC

Duke Ai of Qin 秦哀公

Ruler of Qin
- Reign: 536–501 BC
- Predecessor: Duke Jing of Qin
- Successor: Duke Hui I of Qin
- Died: 501 BC
- Issue: Duke Yi of Qin (秦夷公); Bo Ying
Posthumous name
- Duke Ai (哀公) or Duke Bi (畢公) or Duke Bi (㻫公) or Duke Bai (栢公)
- House: Ying
- Dynasty: Qin
- Father: Duke Jing of Qin

Duke Ai of Qin (Chinese: 秦哀公; pinyin: Qín Āi Gōng, died 501 BC), personal name unknown, was a duke of the state of Qin during the Spring and Autumn era and Eastern Zhou dynasty. Duke Ai succeeded his father Duke Jing, who died in 537 BC, as ruler of Qin.

== Marriage with Chu ==
In 523 BC, Duke Ai betrothed his daughter Bo Ying to Crown Prince Jian of the state of Chu, Qin's ally at the time. Prince Jian's father, King Ping of Chu, sent the minister Fei Wuji to escort the princess to Chu. However, Fei Wuji saw that the princess was beautiful and persuaded King Ping to take her as his own wife. Prince Jian fled abroad and was later killed. Bo Ying later bore King Ping a son, who in 515 BC ascended the Chu throne, to be known as King Zhao of Chu.

== Fighting Wu to help Chu ==
In 506 BC, King Helü of the State of Wu invaded Chu, decisively defeated the Chu army at the Battle of Boju, and captured the Chu capital Ying. King Zhao of Chu escaped to the State of Sui. Chu minister Shen Baoxu went to Qin to plead for assistance. It is said that Duke Ai originally rejected the request, but finally agreed to help after Shen Baoxu wailed for seven days outside the Qin palace without eating.

Duke Ai sent generals Zipu (子蒲) and Zihu (子虎) with 500 chariots to Chu. In 505 BC, the joint Qin-Chu forces defeated Wu in a series of battles. King Helü was forced to retreat to Wu, while King Zhao returned to Chu.

== Death and succession ==
In 501 BC, Duke Ai died after reigning for 36 years. His son predeceased him and was given the posthumous title of Duke Yi (秦夷公). Duke Ai was succeeded by Duke Yi's son, his grandson Duke Hui I of Qin.

Duke Ai of Qin House of Ying Died: 501 BC
Regnal titles
Preceded by Duke Jing of Qin	Duke of Qin; 536–501 BC	Succeeded by Duke Hui I of Qin
