= 477 BC =

477 BC in various calendars
- Gregorian calendar: 477 BC; CDLXXVII BC
- Ab urbe condita: 277
- Ancient Egypt era: XXVII dynasty, 49
- Pharaoh: Xerxes I of Persia, 9
- Ancient Greek Olympiad (summer): 75th Olympiad, year 4
- Assyrian calendar: 4274
- Balinese saka calendar: N/A
- Bengali calendar: −1070 – −1069
- Berber calendar: 474
- Buddhist calendar: 68
- Burmese calendar: −1114
- Byzantine calendar: 5032–5033
- Chinese calendar: 癸亥年 (Water Pig); 2221 or 2014 — to — 甲子年 (Wood Rat); 2222 or 2015
- Coptic calendar: −760 – −759
- Discordian calendar: 690
- Ethiopian calendar: −484 – −483
- Hebrew calendar: 3284–3285
- Hindu calendars
- Vikram Samvat: −420 – −419
- Shaka Samvat: N/A
- Kali Yuga: 2624–2625
- Holocene calendar: 9524
- Iranian calendar: 1098 BP – 1097 BP
- Islamic calendar: 1132 BH – 1131 BH
- Javanese calendar: N/A
- Julian calendar: N/A
- Korean calendar: 1857
- Minguo calendar: 2388 before ROC 民前2388年
- Nanakshahi calendar: −1944
- Thai solar calendar: 66–67
- Tibetan calendar: ཆུ་མོ་ཕག་ལོ་ (female Water-Boar) −350 or −731 or −1503 — to — ཤིང་ཕོ་བྱི་བ་ལོ་ (male Wood-Rat) −349 or −730 or −1502

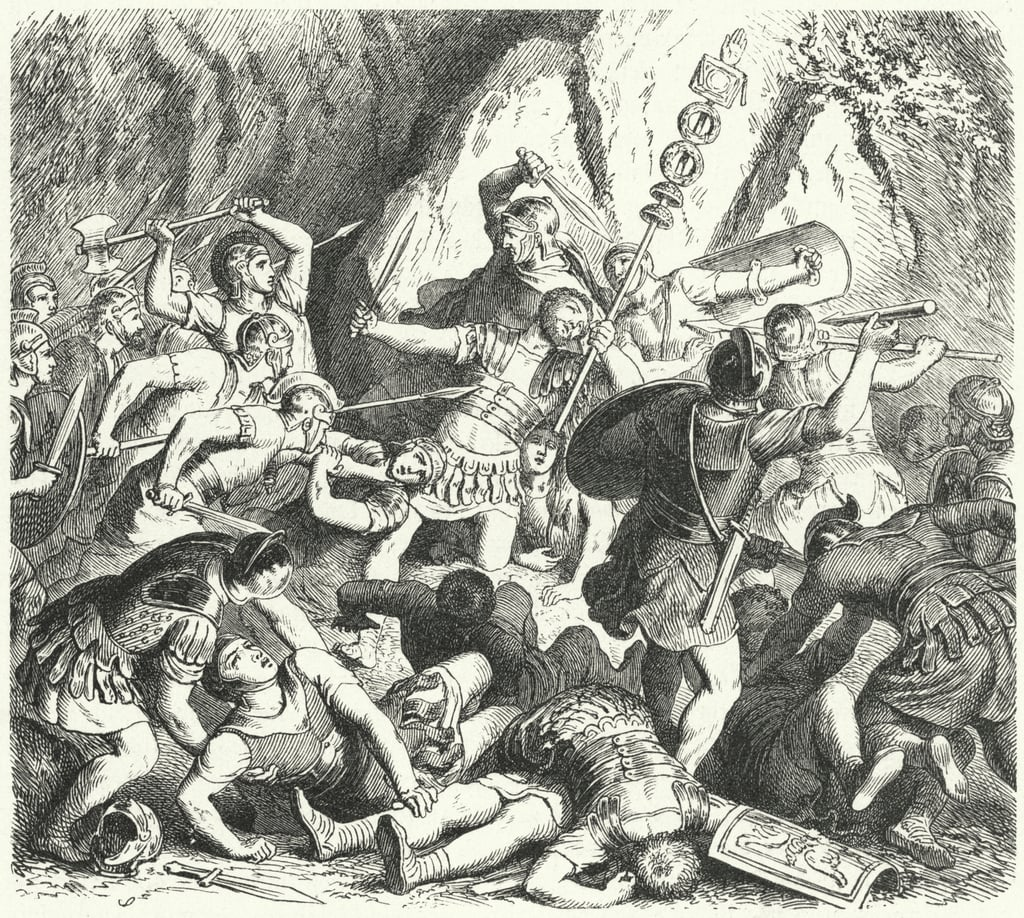
The Battle of the Cremera, 477 BC

Year 477 BC was a year of the pre-Julian Roman calendar. At the time, it was known as the Year of the Consulship of Pulvillus and Lanatus (or, less frequently, year 277 Ab urbe condita). The denomination 477 BC for this year has been used since the early medieval period, when the Anno Domini calendar era became the prevalent method in Europe for naming years.

== Events ==
=== By place ===
==== Greece ====
- The Spartan co-ruler Leotychides and the Athenian leader Themistocles lead a fleet and army to reoccupy northern Greece and to punish the aristocratic family of the Aleuads for having aided the Persians. Leotychides is caught accepting a bribe during the operations in Thessaly.
- Greek maritime cities around the Aegean Sea no longer wish to be under Spartan control and at Delos offer their allegiance, through Aristides, to Athens. They form the Delian League (also known as the Confederacy of Delos) with Cimon as their principal commander.

==== Roman Republic ====
- Roman forces in a stronghold on the Cremera River are defeated by an army of Veientes from the Etruscan city of Veii in the Battle of the Cremera.

== Deaths ==
- Duke Dao of Qin, ruler of the state of Qin
- Emperor Itoku of Japan, according to legend.
