= Bo Ying =

Consort to sixth-century BC Chu ruler, King Ping

Bo Ying 伯嬴
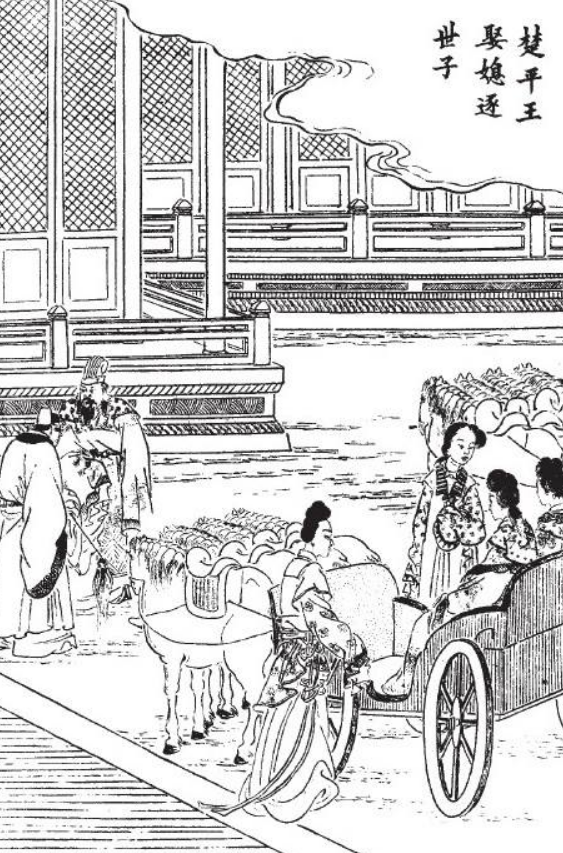
- Husband: King Ping of Chu
- Issue: Xiong Zhen
- House: Ying
- Father: Duke Ai of Qin
- Other names: Chu Ying 楚赢

Bo Ying
Transcriptions
Standard Mandarin
- Hanyu Pinyin: Bó yíng
- Wade–Giles: Po ying
Yue: Cantonese
- Jyutping: Baa3 jing4
Southern Min
- Hokkien POJ: Peh êng

Bo Ying (Chinese: 伯嬴) was a consort to the sixth-century BCE Chu ruler, King Ping, and mother of his successor, King Zhao.

== Biography ==
Bo Ying was a daughter of the ruler of Qin. The Biographies of Exemplary Women states that Bo Ying's father was Duke Mu of Qin, but he reigned nearly 100 years earlier than her husband King Ping of Chu, so it is generally accepted that she was a daughter of Duke Ai.

The Zuo zhuan and Shiji record that she was betrothed to the heir of Chu, but the official who negotiated her marriage, Fei Wuji, persuaded the Chu king to marry her himself. Bo Ying married the king on her arrival in Chu and later gave birth to a son named Xiong Zhen. Bo Ying's political marriage is one of very few to have been recorded between the Chu and Qin states.

Bo Ying's son became king of Chu in 516 BCE. In 506, Helu of Wu captured the Chu capital, and Bo Ying's son fled with a younger sister. The Biographies of Exemplary Women records that Helu attempted to rape Bo Ying and other members of the harem, but Bo Ying resisted with a knife and lectured him on morality. Helu was ashamed and retreated, and Chu was later liberated by Qin.

== Family ==
- Father: Duke Ai of Qin (536 — 501 BCE)
- Husband: King Ping of Chu (528 — 516 BCE)
  - Son: King Zhao of Chu (515 — 489 BCE)
