= Shenyin Shu =

General of the State of Chu (died 506 BC)

Shen Yin Shu
- 沈尹戍 or 沈尹戌
- Died: 506 BC; Yongshi (in present-day Jingshan County)
- Other name: Shen Yin Xu
- Known for: Battle of Boju
- Title: Sima (Chief commander of army)
- Children: Shen Zhuliang (Duke of Ye), Shen Houzang

Shenyin Shu (Chinese: 沈尹戍; pinyin: Shěn Yǐn Shù) or Shenyin Xu (Chinese: 沈尹戌; pinyin: Shěn Yǐn Xū) (died 506 BC) was a general of the State of Chu during the Spring and Autumn period of ancient China.

== Family ==
There are two different accounts of Shenyin Shu's ancestor:

- It is widely believed that Shenyin Shu's surname was "Shenyin (沈尹)" and was a great-grandson of King Zhuang of Chu. Shu's descendants changed their surname to "Shen (沈)".
- New Book of Tang wrote that his name was "Yinwu (尹戊)", surname was "Shen (沈)", New Book of Tang provides a pedigree tracing Shen Yinwu's ancestry back to Dan Shu Ji, who was a son of King Wen of Zhou and the founder of Shen state (沈国). The pedigree gives Shen Yinwu's grandfather as Shen Cheng (沈逞). Shen Cheng was a son of a Shen state ruler. Shen Cheng fled to the Chu and changed his surname to Shen.

== Killing of Fei Wuji ==
Lüshi Chunqiu, a Chinese classic text compiled around 239 BC, credits Shen Yin Shu with getting rid of the corrupt official Fei Wuji. During the reign of King Ping of Chu, Fei Wuji induced the king to marry the bride of the crown prince Jian. Fearing the revenge of the prince when he became king, Fei persuaded King Ping to kill Prince Jian, his tutor Wu She, and Wu She's sons. Prince Jian managed to escape abroad, and Wu She's second son Wu Zixu also escaped to the state of Wu, but Wu She and his first son Wu Shang were executed. Fei Wuji then framed another official Xi Wan (郤宛) and tricked the prime minister Nang Wa (also known as Zichang) into killing him. Shen Yin Shu, who had risen to the position of Sima (chief commander of the army), pointed out Nang's mistake and persuaded him to execute the hated Fei Wuji.

== Battle of Boju ==
Chinese states, 5th century BC

Zuo Zhuan, one of the earliest Chinese works of narrative history compiled in the 4th century BC, gives a detailed account of Shen Yin Shu's words and deeds in the historic Battle of Boju.

In 506 BC, during the reign of King Zhao of Chu, King Helü of Wu led an army to invade Chu. His army, which was commanded by the military strategist Sun Tzu, author of The Art of War, as well as Wu Zixu, was out to avenge the death of Helü's father and brother. The Wu army sailed up the Huai River and then left their ships and marched to the east bank of the Han River. In response, prime minister Nang Wa (Zichang) and Shen Yin Shu led the Chu army to the west bank of the Han, across the river from the invaders.

Shen Yin Shu devised a plan in which Nang Wa would take up defensive positions with the main army along the Han River, while Shen would go north to Fangcheng on Chu's northern frontier, and lead the troops stationed there to destroy the Wu ships left on the Huai River and block the three passes on the Wu army's return route. Nang Wa would then cross the Han and the two forces would simultaneously attack the Wu army from both the front and the back. Nang accepted the plan, and Shen departed for Fangcheng.

After Shen's departure, however, the historiographer Shi Huang (史皇) said to Nang Wa that the people of Chu hated Nang and loved Shen Yin Shu, and that if he followed Shen's plan then Shen would take all the credit for the victory and Nang would be doomed. Nang had a change of heart and decided to cross the river and attack right away.

The two armies fought three battles between the Xiaobie (southeast of present-day Hanchuan) and Dabie Mountains and the Wu were victorious. Convinced that he could not win, Nang Wa wanted to flee but was dissuaded by Shi Huang. The Wu army then attacked at Boju, routing the Chu army. Shi Huang was killed in the battle and Nang Wa escaped to the state of Zheng. The Wu army then pursued the remaining Chu troops, won five more battles, and captured Ying, the capital of Chu.

Shen Yin Shu had by now returned and defeated the Wu forces at Yongshi River (雍澨, present-day Sima River in Jingshan County), but he was wounded three times in as many battles. Not wanting to be captured alive, he asked officer Wu Goubi to kill him and bring his head home.

Zuo Zhuan also mentions that after the fall of Ying, Shen Yin Shu's wife was taken as prisoner to Wu. One of their sons, Shen Houzang, went to Wu but was unable to bring her back.

== Legacy ==
After the war, King Zhao enfeoffed Shen Yin Shu's son Shen Zhuliang with the city of Ye (in present-day Ye County of Henan Province) at the northern frontier of the Chu kingdom. In 478 BC, during the reign of King Hui of Chu, Shen Zhuliang put down the rebellion of Duke of Bai and restored the king's rule. He was awarded the title Ye Gong (Duke of Ye) for his merit, and became the founding ancestor of the Ye surname. Shen Yin Shu is therefore recognized as an original ancestor of both Shen and Ye clans, which are now the 49th and 42nd most common Chinese surnames, respectively.

Although the Battle of Boju is best known today as the greatest victory of Sun Tzu and Wu Zixu, two of the most famous generals in Chinese history, ancient historians portrayed Shen Yin Shu as a capable general and a worthy adversary. His deeds and especially his death have been dramatized in several historical novels.
