= Qin Hui (disambiguation) =

Qin Hui is the name of:

- Qin Hui (1090–1155), Prime Minister of the Southern Song Dynasty
- Qin Hui (historian) (born 1953), professor of history in Tsinghua University

== See also ==
- King Hui of Qin
- Duke Hui of Qin (disambiguation)
