= Zhuan Zhu =

Chinese assassin of King Liao of Wu (died 515 BC)

Zhuan Zhu (專諸; died 515 BC) was an assassin from the Kingdom of Wu during the Spring and Autumn period of China. Zhuan Zhu used to be a butcher, he was very filial to his mother. As Prince Guang (later King Helü of Wu) wanted to kill King Liao of Wu and take the throne himself, Zhuan Zhu was recommended to Prince Guang by Wu Zixu. In 515 BC he managed to kill King Liao in a party with a dagger hidden in a fish. He was killed after he had completed his mission. In folklore, the dagger he used to kill King Liao was named Yuchang (魚腸), or "Fish intestines", because it was small enough to be hidden in a fish.

== Life ==
Zhuan Zhu came from a butcher family and was extremely filial to his mother. According to the Yue Jue Shu, "Zhuan Zhu fought with others and had the courage to face ten thousand men. When he heard his wife call, he would immediately return. Isn't this the beginning of the fear of wives?". In truth, it was because Zhuan Zhu's wife held his mother's cane. Zhuan Zhu was so filial that he regarded the cane as his mother; thus, he followed his wife home. At that time, the great Chu general, Wu Zixu, fled from Chu to Wu and met Zhuan Zhu. He was surprised that Zhuan Zhu was afraid of women, so Zhuan Zhu told him: "Those who can submit to a woman can surely stretch out above ten thousand men." Wu Zixu saw him as a remarkable talent.

Wu Zixu fled to the state of Wu after his father and brother were unjustly killed by the King of Chu. He went to see the King Liao of Wu, and tried to persuade him to attack Chu, but was stopped by Liao's nephew, Prince Guang, who wanted to avenge his own personal grudge. Wu Zixu knew that Helü of Wu wanted to kill King Liao and thought to himself, "He has his own plans, and I can't talk to him about outside matters." So he recommended Zhuan Zhu to Helü of Wu. After Prince Guang acquired Zhuan Zhu, he treated him as an honored guest and showed respect to his mother. Zhuan Zhu inquired about the preferences of King Liao of Wu and learned that he loved "grilled fish." So he went to the shore of Lake Tai to learn the art of grilling fish. The fish he grilled had a unique flavor.

In the spring of the following year, after the death of King Ping of Chu in 516 BCE, King Liao of Wu saw Chu mourning its deceased ruler. He dispatched his brothers Prince Guang and Zhuyong to lead troops to besiege the cities of Liu and Lin in Chu, and he sent Yanling Jizi to observe the movements of other vassal states in the Jin region. Chu's forces intercepted Gaiyu and Zhuyong, cutting off their retreat, thus preventing the Wu troops from withdrawing. At this moment, Prince Guang said to Zhuan Zhu, "This is an opportunity that cannot be missed. If we don't act now, how can we seize it? Besides, I am the rightful heir to the throne. Even if Jizi returns, he won't depose me." Zhuan Zhu replied, "King Liao can be killed. Currently, he is old and weak, and his two brothers are leading troops to attack Chu, but they have been cut off by Chu, leaving Wu surrounded. Moreover, there are no capable ministers in Wu's court. What can they do to us?" Prince Guang hurriedly kneeled down and said, "My fate is in your hands!".

Zhuan Zhu was moved by Prince Guang's kindness and decided to repay him with his life, but he was concerned about his mother. Before departing, he returned home to visit his mother. She told Zhuan Zhu that a great man should be remembered in history while standing between heaven and earth. She urged him not to regret his whole life because of trivial family matters. She then pretended to be thirsty and asked Zhuan Zhu to fetch some clear water for her. Zhuan Zhu went to fetch the water, and upon his return, he found his mother had already hanged herself in the back hall. His mother's sacrifice relieved Zhuan Zhu of his worries about his family and spurred him on to accomplish his mission. This account is sourced from The Records of the Eastern Zhou Dynasty States as it is not mentioned in Annals of Wu and Yue or Records of the Grand Historian.

In April 515 BC, Prince Guang prepared a banquet to entertain King Liao of Wu and ambushed his soldiers in the basement. King Liao of Wu desired grilled fish but remained vigilant. He sent troops from the palace to Prince Guang's mansion. After a few rounds of drinks, Prince Guang pretended to have a foot ailment and went to the basement to rest. Zhuan Zhu followed the plan, concealing a dagger inside a grilled fish and presenting it. When the fish was delivered to King Liao, Zhuan Zhu suddenly tore open the fish's belly, took out the dagger, and stabbed King Liao, piercing through three layers of armor. King Liao died on the spot, and his guards simultaneously killed Zhuan Zhu. Taking advantage of the chaos among King Liao's soldiers, Prince Guang immediately sent his soldiers to kill all of King Liao's soldiers and proclaimed himself king, namely King Helü of Wu.

After Helü ascended the throne, he appointed Zhuan Zhu's son Zhuan Yi as the Grand Marshal. He also gave Zhuan Zhu a generous funeral in accordance with his wish to be buried next to the tomb of Taibo. According to Wang Ao's Records of Gusu, Zhuan Zhu's tomb is located inside the Panmen Gate next to the Temple of Wudaifu (Wu Zixu), but there is no trace of it today.

== Legacy ==
The Fish Intestine Sword, also known as the Fish Concealed Sword, was the dagger used by Zhuan Zhu to assassinate King Liao of Wu. It is said that the blade had patterns resembling fish scales, which was the result of the complicated process used to forge it. The purpose of this was to be able to pierce through the armor worn by King Liao under his clothes. It was also called the "Fish Intestine Sword" because it was eventually hidden in the belly of a fish.

The Tomb of Zhuan Zhu is located on the east ridge of Hongshan Mountain in Suzhou, Jiangsu Province, China. It is a small mound that is about 2 meters high and 10 meters in diameter. The tomb is surrounded by a stone wall and there is a stele in front of the tomb that tells the story of Zhuan Zhu.

The Zhuan Zhu Pagoda was located in Doulou Lane, Wuxi City, Jiangsu Province, China. It was a tall pagoda that was said to have been built by Helü, the king of Wu, in honor of Zhuan Zhu, a loyal retainer who assassinated King Liao of Wu. The pagoda was a popular tourist destination in Wuxi. It was a reminder of Zhuan Zhu's loyalty and sacrifice, and it was a symbol of the power of one person to change the course of history. Unfortunately, the pagoda was demolished during the Cultural Revolution in the 1960s.

Zhuan Zhu Lane is located in the western part of Suzhou City. It is a lane that is close to the inner city river and the city wall. It connects to Jinmen Gate in the south and Guanmen Gate in the north. It is said that the lane was named after Zhuan Zhu's tomb, which is located here. Later, the area around Zhuan Zhu Lane gradually developed into a center for the jade carving industry; hence, the name of Zhuan Zhu Lane has also been mistakenly passed down as "Chuanzhu Lane" due to its association with jade carving.
