= Wu (surname 伍) =

Chinese surname Wu 伍

Wu (Chinese: 伍; pinyin: Wǔ; Jyutping: Ng5) is a Chinese surname. It is the 89th name on the Hundred Family Surnames poem. It means ‘five’ in Chinese, an alternative form of the character 五. A 2013 study found that it was the 116th most common name, shared by 1,710,000 people or 0.130% of the population, with the province with the most being Guangdong.

== Origins ==
- from the personal name of Wu Xu (伍胥), an official during the reign of the legendary Yellow Emperor
- from the personal name of Wu Shen (伍參), an official in Chu during the Spring and Autumn period

== Notable people ==
- Wu Bingjian (Howqua) (伍秉鑑) (1769–1843), Hong merchant
- Wu Jin-lin (伍錦霖), President of Examination Yuan
- Wu Yee-sun (伍宜孫) (1904–2005), Hong Kong entrepreneur and founder of the Wing Lung Bank
- Wu Shih-wen (伍世文), Minister of National Defense of the Republic of China from 2000 to 2002
- Christine Ng Wing-mei (伍詠薇) (born 1969), Hong Kong singer-actress
- Wu Lien-teh (伍連德) (1879–1960), Malaysia-born Chinese physician and pioneer epidemiologist
- Wu, Melissa, Australian diver
- Sheryl WuDunn (伍潔芳/伍洁芳), American writer
- Johnny Eng (born ca. 1958) (伍少衡; Jyutping: ng5 siu3 hang4), also known as "Onionhead" (Chinese: 蔥頭; Jyutping: cung1 tau4) or "Machinegun Johnny", Hong Kong-born American criminal and leader of Flying Dragons (gang)
- Wu, William F. (伍家球), science fiction author
- Wu Zixu (伍子胥), general in the Spring and Autumn period of Chinese history
- Wu Bai (伍佰), stage name of Taiwanese singer Wu Chun-lin (吳俊霖)
- Celeste Ng (Chinese: 伍綺詩), (born 1980) American novelist
- Alice Wu (伍思薇) (born 1970), American film director and screenwriter
- Mike Eng (伍國慶) (born 1946), American politician and member of the Democratic Party
- Philip Ng Wan-lung (Chinese: 伍允龍), Hong Kong-born American actor, martial artist and action choreographer
- Chelsia Ng (伍家丽), Malaysian actress
- Jiahui Wu (伍家辉) (born 1981), Malaysian singer-songwriter
- Sky Wu (伍思凱) (born 1966), Taiwanese singer-songwriter
- Irene Ng Phek Hoong (Chinese: 伍碧虹) (born 1963), Malaysian-born Singaporean news publisher and former politician
- Winnie Ng (伍麗珠) (born 1952), Hong Kong former sportswoman

== See also ==
- Wujiagang District, in Yichang, Hubei
