= Duke Jing of Qin =

Duke Jing of Qin 秦景公

Ruler of Qin
- Reign: 576–537 BC
- Predecessor: Duke Huan of Qin
- Successor: Duke Ai of Qin
- Died: 537 BC
Names
- Ying Shi (嬴石)
Posthumous name
- Duke Jing (景公) or Duke Xi (僖公)
- House: Ying
- Dynasty: Qin
- Father: Duke Huan of Qin

Duke Jing of Qin (Chinese: 秦景公; pinyin: Qín Jǐng Gōng, died 537 BC), born Ying Shi, was a duke of the state of Qin during the Eastern Zhou dynasty. Duke Jing succeeded his father Duke Huan, who died in 577 BC, as ruler of Qin.

== Reign ==
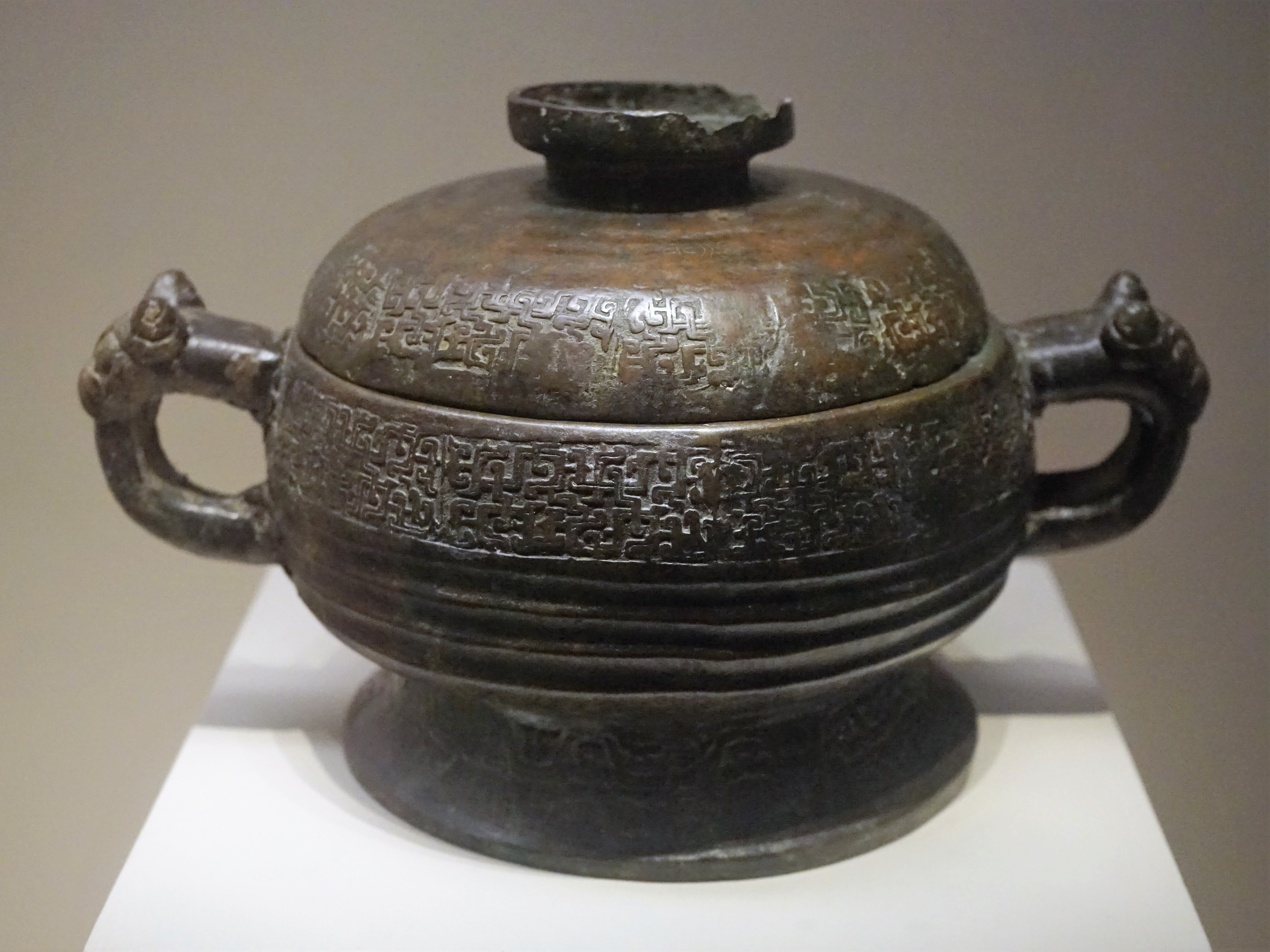
"Qin Gong" Bronze Gui. Unearthed at Tianshui, Gansu in 1921. The inscription inside records that Duke Jing was determined to continue the work of his predecessors and guard their land.

In 562 BC, the state of Jin attacked the state of Zheng, which was then an ally of Qin and Chu. In order to help Zheng, Qin attacked and defeated Jin at the Battle of Li (栎, in present-day Yongji, Shanxi).

Three years later, during the reign of Duke Dao of Jin, Jin led an alliance of 13 states to attack Qin. The allied army set up camp after crossing the Jing River. Qin poisoned the river from upstream, killing many soldiers of Jin and its allies, who were forced to retreat. This event is known as the Battle of Qianyan (迁延之役).

In 537 BC Duke Jing died after 40 years of rule. He was succeeded by his son, Duke Ai of Qin.

== Tomb ==
In 1976, Duke Jing's tomb was discovered in Fengxiang County in Baoji, Shaanxi Province. Yong, the long-time capital of Qin, was located in Fengxiang. Archaeologists spent the next ten years excavating the tomb, the largest of the 43 Qin tombs discovered in Fengxiang. Shaped like an inverted pyramid, the tomb is as deep as an eight-story building and is the size of a palace. It is the largest tomb ever excavated in China.

More than 180 coffins containing 186 human remains were found in the tomb, victims of funereal human sacrifice, a practice that was started in the state of Qin by Duke Wu in 678 BC and subsequently abolished by Duke Xian in 384 BC. This is the largest number of human sacrifice victims discovered in a Chinese tomb dating from any period after the Western Zhou dynasty.

Duke Jing of Qin House of Ying Died: 537 BC
Regnal titles
Preceded by Duke Huan of Qin	Duke of Qin; 576–537 BC	Succeeded by Duke Ai of Qin
