= Wu Zixu =

Chinese Wu kingdom general and politician (died 484 BC)

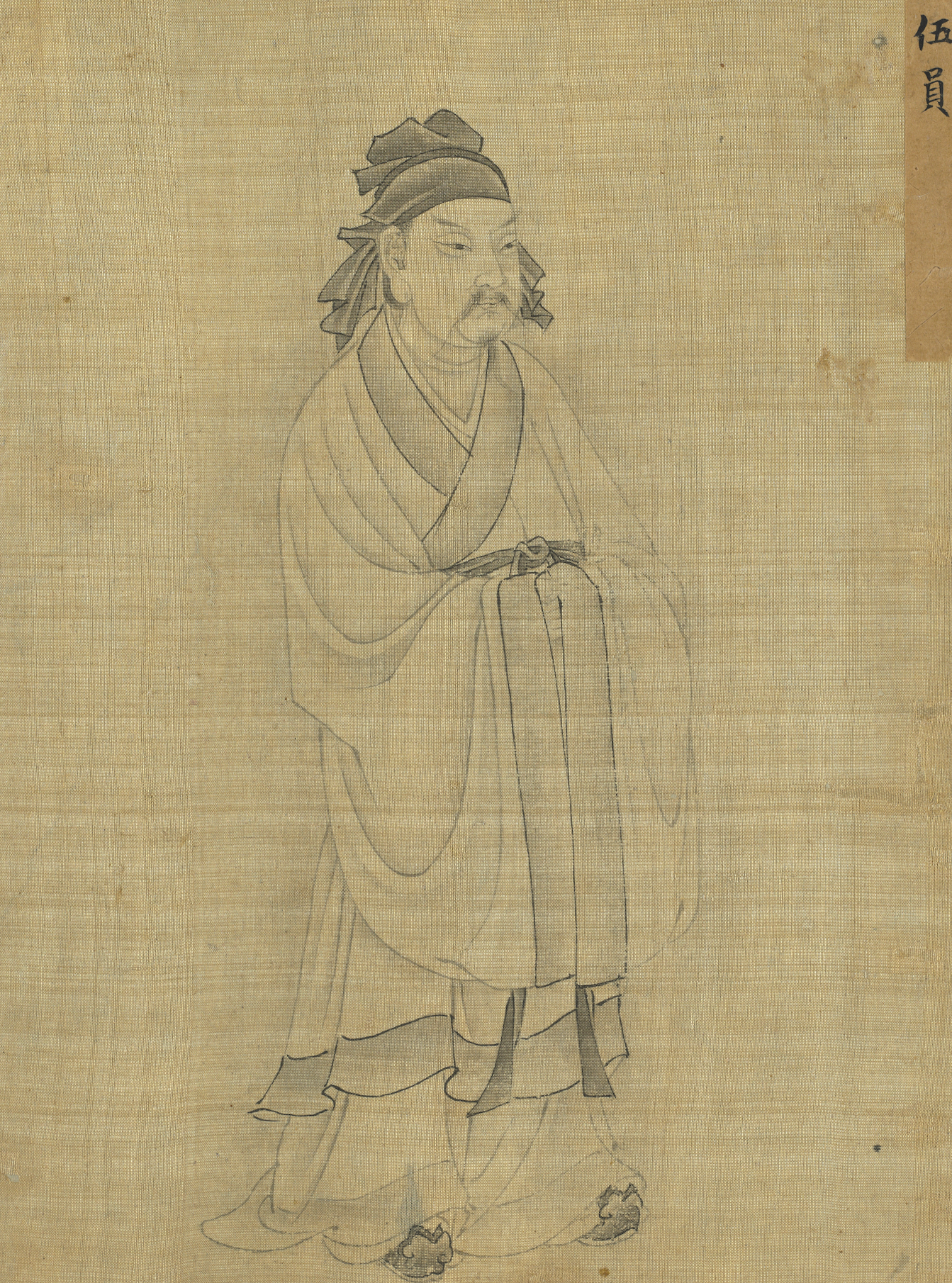
- Portrait of Wu Zixu (date unknown, likely Ming dynasty)
- Chinese: 伍子胥
Transcriptions
Standard Mandarin
- Hanyu Pinyin: Wǔ Zǐxū

Wu Yun
- Traditional Chinese: 伍員
- Simplified Chinese: 伍员
Transcriptions
Standard Mandarin
- Hanyu Pinyin: Wǔ Yún (Note: The character 員 or 员 can also be read yuán but Wu's name uses the pronunciation yún.)

Shenxu (Wu kingdom title)
- Chinese: 申胥
Transcriptions
Standard Mandarin
- Hanyu Pinyin: Shēnxū

Heroic and Upright King (Tang Dynasty title)
- Chinese: 英烈王
Transcriptions
Standard Mandarin
- Hanyu Pinyin: Yīngliè Wáng

God of Waves (as a river deity)
- Traditional Chinese: 濤神
- Simplified Chinese: 涛神
Transcriptions
Standard Mandarin
- Hanyu Pinyin: Tāo Shén

Note: names are in simplified characters followed by traditional and Pinyin transliteration.

Wu Yun (died 484 BC), better known by his courtesy name Zixu, was a Chinese military general and politician of the Wu kingdom in the Spring and Autumn period (722–481 BC). Since his death, he has evolved into a model of loyalty in Chinese culture. He is the best known historical figure with the Chinese family name "Wu" (伍). All branches of the Wu clan claim that he was their "first ancestor".

== Classical sources ==
The historical records of Wu are found in the famous Chinese classics: Records of the Grand Historian (史記; Shǐjì) by Sima Qian, The Art of War by Sun Tzu and The Annals of Lü Buwei. He is also mentioned in Guliang Zhuan and Gongyang Zhuan. The accounts differ, showing the significant influence of folklore on his historical character.

== Life ==
=== Early life ===
Wu Zixu was the second son of Wu She, the Grand Tutor of the crown prince Jian of the state of Chu. In 522 BC, Fei Wuji, a corrupt official was sent to Qin to select a bride for the prince. King Ping of Chu received a princess from the state of Qin as a bride for his son, but decided to keep her for himself upon seeing her beauty. Fei Wuji, having gained favour from the King, convinced King Ping that Wu She and the crown prince himself would start a rebellion due to the bride being from Qin, and persuaded the king to execute Wu She. Before his death, Wu She was forced, under duress, to send a letter to his sons, Wu Shang (伍尚) and Wu Zixu, which asked them to join him in the capital. While both realized that this was a trap, Wu Shang decided to go to the capital to die with his father. Wu Zixu, promising revenge, fled to the state of Wu.

=== Escape ===
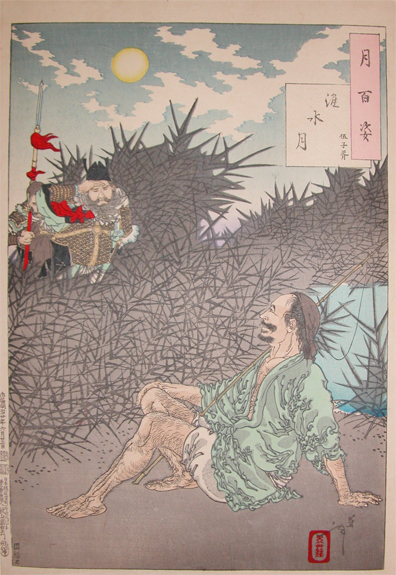
Huai River moon — Wu Zixu, from Yoshitoshi's series One Hundred Aspects of the Moon, depicting Wu Zixu's escape from Chu on the Huai River.

Wu Zixu, along with Prince Jian's son, Prince Sheng, hoped to flee to the state of Wu. Wu Zixu, however, was a wanted man. He and the young prince were constantly pursued by soldiers. King Ping also ordered a very tight controls over the state's borders to catch Wu Zixu. As Wu Zixu approached Zhaoguan (昭关), the last pass to the state of Wu, he sought the help of the physician Donggao Gong (东皋公), who recognized him as Wu She's son. Donggao Gong felt deep sympathy for Wu Zixu's plight and offered to help him escape across the border.

According to legend, Donggao Gong gave refuge to Wu Zixu in his home for a week. Under enormous stress, Wu Zixu's hair turned completely white and his facial features aged greatly. The change was a blessing in disguise as Wu Zixu's changed appearance helped him to escape and head to the state of Wu.

=== Campaign against the state of Chu ===
In the state of Wu, Wu Zixu became a trusted advisor of Prince Guang and helped him assassinate his uncle (or cousin, according to Records of the Grand Historian) King Liao of Wu. Prince Guang ascended the throne and was known as King Helü of Wu.

In 506 BCE, during the reign of King Zhao of Chu, King Helü decided to invade Chu. The king personally led the army, along with his younger brother Fugai, Wu Zixu, as well as Sun Tzu, author of The Art of War. Although Chu had a strong army led by Nang Wa and Shen Yinshu, it suffered a heavy defeat at the Battle of Boju. King Zhao of Chu fled to Sui and the Wu army captured Ying, Chu's capital. After entering Ying, Wu Zixu exhumed King Ping's corpse, and gave it 300 lashes to exact vengeance.

The military victory led to Wu Zixu's elevation to Duke of Shen and his alias Shenxu.

=== Death ===
Bo Pi, whose grandfather had also been unjustly killed in Chu, arrived in the state of Wu. Despite warnings about Bo Pi's character, Wu Zixu recommended him to the king of Wu, who made Bo Pi a minister.

After the death of King Helü, Wu Zixu did not earn the trust of King Fuchai, the new monarch of Wu. Wu Zixu saw the long-term danger of King Goujian of Yue and advised the king to conquer that state. The King, however, listened instead to Bo Pi, who had been bribed by the Yue state. Concerned with the safety of the kingdom, Wu Zixu pleaded with the king to take action against Yue but was ignored. The King instead gave Wu Zixu a sword and ordered him to commit suicide on the justification that his behaviour amounted to sabotage. Before he committed suicide, Wu Zixu asked King Fuchai to remove his eyes after his death and hang them on the city gate so that he could watch the capture of the Wu capital by the Yue army.

Ten years after Wu Zixu's death, as Wu Zixu had predicted, King Goujian of Yue conquered the state of Wu. Faced with the demise of his state, King Fuchai committed suicide. He lamented that he did not heed the counsel of Wu Zixu and covered his face as he died because he dared not face Wu in the afterlife.

== Legacy ==
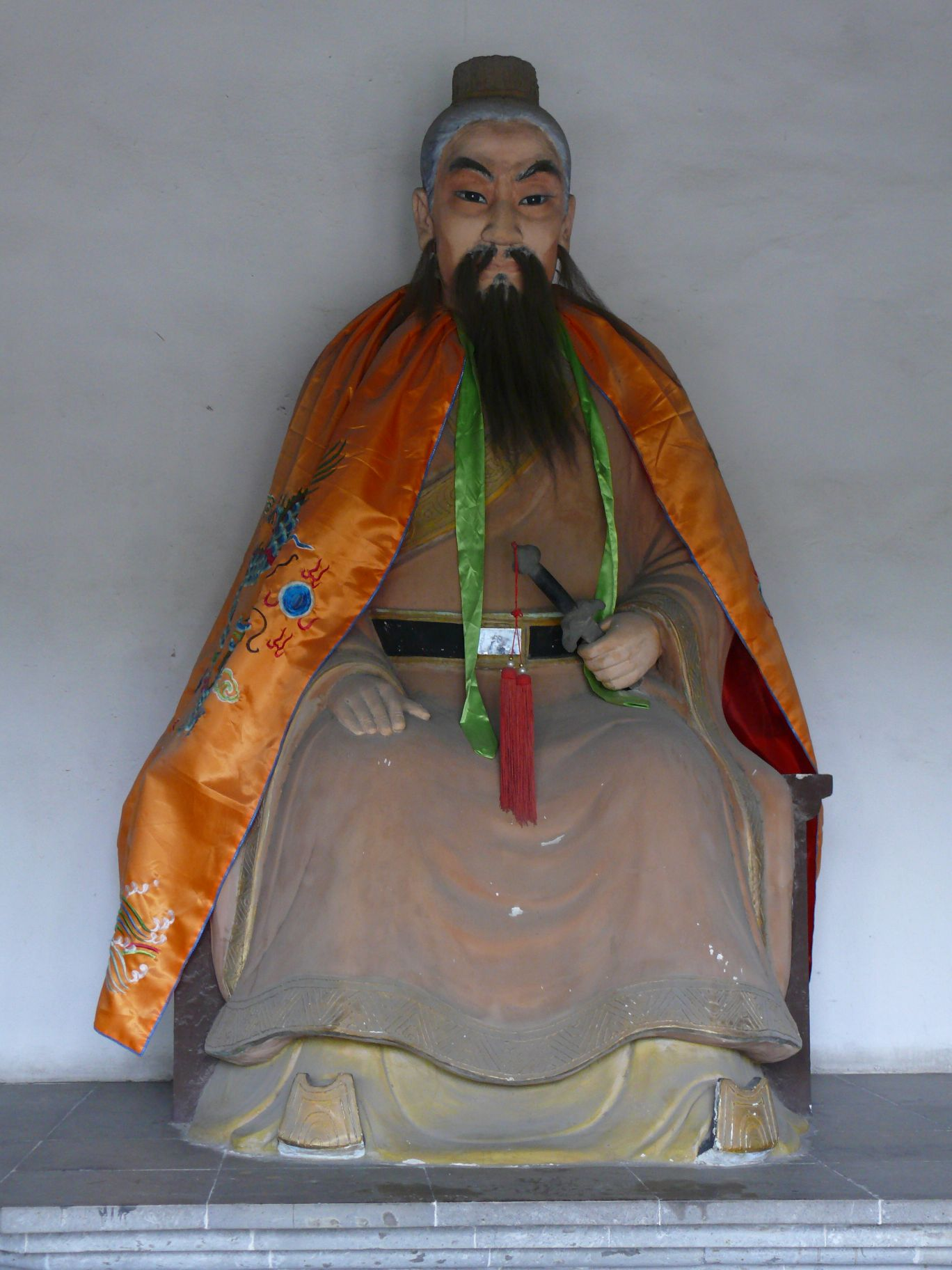
Statue of Wu Zixu in Suzhou.

Wu Zixu is worshipped in eastern China as Taoshen, "God of the Waves". He was also long considered the god of the tidal bore of the Qiantang River near Hangzhou and continues to be worshipped, particularly by Taiwanese Taoists, as one of the five Kings of the Water Immortals. Having assisted King Helü in planning modern Suzhou (then known as "Helü City"), Wu is also sometimes credited as the culture hero responsible for the invention of the waterwheel.

=== Double Fifth festival ===
Some Chinese believe that the Dragon Boat Festival (the Double-Fifth festival celebrated on the fifth day of the fifth lunar month) usually associated with the suicide of the poet Qu Yuan (d. 278 BC) originally commemorated the death of Wu Zixu (484 BC), whose body was thrown into a river after his forced suicide. However, there are caveats. First of all, the practice of venerating Wu Zixu as a water deity can only be traced to the time of the Han dynasty (202 BC–220 AD). (Note: The 6th century source (荊楚歲時記; Jingchu Suishiji, "Record of the Year and Seasons of Jing-Chu") claims "[Wu] Zixu is the correct antecedent", citing a pseudo-Han Period documentary evidence ("Stele Inscription on the Filial Daughter Maiden [Cao E]"). The stele writing is purportedly attributable to a man named 邯鄲子禮/邯鄲淳; Handan Zili/ in the year 153, but scholars conclude that the existence of such stele was a fabrication, and there was never anything but the calligrapher's copy, which can be dated to the year 358.) Furthermore, the Wu Zixu water god cult in the Han era was not directly connected with dragon boat racing (that is to say, the quoted evidence on the Wu Zixu cult fails to mention dragon boat racing, let alone any type of riverboat racing), although "close parallels with the boat competition" have been noted by a 6th-century commentary on the festival calendar, according to one scholar. (Note: i.e., the aforementioned Record of the Year and Seasons of Jing-Chu quoting the stele inscription as evidence of Wu Zixu cult in the Han Era.) (Note: The excerpt from the Cao E stele inscriptions are given by Chapman (2014) and by Chittick (2020)) It is documented that sailing boats did carry ritual dancers to appease Zixu's spirit.

=== Confucian analysis ===
The parallel lives of Wu Zixu and Qu Yuan have been noted, not just being cast into water, but being "Confucian martyrs", both deaths being the result of acting as scrupled ministers giving his king cautionary advice. While both were propped up by the "Confucian literati", Zixu seems to be the more favored of the two to Confucian minds, though later Qu Yuan later became more popular and supplanted Zixu as water deity.

The story of Wu Zixu is prominent in Sima Qian's Records of the Grand Historian, where it is used as a foil of the author's own choice to accept castration penalty (宫刑) for the sake of a greater goal instead of having chosen honorable suicide.

=== Arts and monuments ===
Peking and other Chinese operas include several stories based on Wu Zixu's story, among them Wen Zhaoguan (文昭关).

In 2006, a memorial in honor of Wu Zixu was completed in Suzhou.

== See also ==
- Xi Shi
- Yao Li
- Zhuan Zhu
- Wu as a surname
- Naval history of China
