= Duke Huan of Qin =

Duke Huan of Qin 秦桓公

Ruler of Qin
- Reign: 603–577 BC
- Predecessor: Duke Gong of Qin
- Successor: Duke Jing of Qin
- Died: 577 BC
Names
- Ying Rong (嬴榮)
Posthumous name
- Duke Huan (桓公)
- House: Ying
- Dynasty: Qin
- Father: Duke Gong of Qin

Duke Huan of Qin (Chinese: 秦桓公; pinyin: Qín Huán Gōng, died 577 BC), personal name Ying Rong, was a duke of the state of Qin during the Eastern Zhou dynasty. Duke Huan succeeded his father Duke Gong, who died in 604 BC, as ruler of Qin.

In 578 BC, Qin suffered a major defeat at the hand of the state of Jin. Duke Li of Jin accused Qin of treachery and personally led an alliance of eight states (Jin, Qi, Song, Wey, Zheng, Cao, Zhu, and Teng) to attack Qin. The two sides fought at Masui (in present-day Jingyang County, Shaanxi). Qin was resoundingly defeated and two of its generals were captured, although Duke Xuan of Cao, ruler of Jin's ally Cao, was also killed in the battle.

Duke Huan died after a reign of 27 years. He was succeeded by his son, Duke Jing.

Duke Huan of Qin House of Ying Died: 577 BC
Regnal titles
Preceded by Duke Gong of Qin	Duke of Qin; 603–577 BC	Succeeded by Duke Jing of Qin
