= Shen Baoxu =

Ancient Chinese minister (fl. 506 BCE)

Shen Baoxu (Chinese: 申包胥, fl. 506 BCE) was a courtier of the Chu state during the Spring and Autumn period. Serving King Ping of Chu and King Zhao of Chu, he defended Chu from invasion by Wu, supported by Shen's friend Wu Zixu. When Chu was conquered by Wu, Shen begged at the court of Qin for their aid. Shen wailed for seven days and nights without ceasing, eventually leading to Duke Ai of Qin sending troops to restore Chu. When King Zhao offered Shen rewards for his actions, he refused, saying that he acted out of loyalty for King Zhao, whose safety was reward enough. Shen was exemplary of a minister's loyalty to his ruler, without regard for reward, and even when the ruler was incompetent.
