= Duke Hui of Qin =

Duke Hui of Qin (Chinese: 秦惠公) may refer to:

- Duke Hui I of Qin, reigned 500–492 BC
- Duke Hui II of Qin, reigned 399–387 BC
