= King Zhao of Chu =

King of Chu, China from 515 to 491 BC

King Zhao of Chu 楚昭王

King of Chu
- Reign: 515–489 BC
- Predecessor: King Ping
- Successor: King Hui
- Died: 489 BC
- Spouse: Zhen Jiang (貞姜); Yue Ji (越姬); Cai Ji (蔡姬)
- Issue: King Hui
Names
- Ancestral name: Mǐ (羋); Lineage name: Xióng (熊); Given name: Zhēn (珍) or Zhěn (軫)
Posthumous name
- King Zhao (昭王) or King Shao (邵王)
- House: Mi
- Dynasty: Chu
- Father: King Ping
- Mother: Bo Ying

King Zhao of Chu (Chinese: 楚昭王; pinyin: Chǔ Zhāo Wáng), personal name Xiong Zhen, was from 515 BC to 489 BC the king of the Chu state. King Zhao succeeded his father, King Ping, and was in turn succeeded to the throne by his son, King Hui.

== Life ==
In 506 BCE, King Helü of the State of Wu led an army to invade Chu. His army was commanded by the military strategist Sun Tzu, author of The Art of War, as well as Wu Zixu, a Chu exile whose father and brother were killed by King Ping of Chu. The Wu army routed the Chu army at the historic Battle of Boju, and the Chu commander Nang Wa fled to the state of Zheng.

The Wu army pursued the remaining Chu troops, won several more battles, and captured Ying, the capital of Chu. Chu general Shen Yin Shu defeated the Wu army but was severely wounded, and was killed by a Chu officer at his own request. King Zhao was forced to flee. During the escape he was wounded by a Chu arrow at Yunmeng from where he made his way through Yun to the State of Sui in northern Hubei. Chu Minister of State Shen Baoxu (申包胥) meanwhile headed for the State of Qin to plead for assistance from their army. At first, the Qin ruler Duke Ai was non-committal in his response but after Shen spent seven days kneeling and wailing in the Qin palace courtyard, Duke Ai was moved by his devotion and agreed to send troops to assist Chu. Thereafter, the Wu army retreated and King Zhao returned to the Chu capital at Ying.

In Zhuangzi, a story is recorded regarding a sheep-butcher named Yue (屠羊說), a subject of King Zhao that fled from Chu when Wu attacked. Yue followed King Zhao, and returned with him when King Zhao returned to his capital. King Zhao wanted to give Yue gifts for what King Zhao saw as Yue's loyalty, but due to Yue's moral beliefs, Yue refused to accept any gifts despite repeated offers.

When king Zhao of Chu lost his kingdom, the sheep-butcher Yue followed him in his flight. When the king (recovered) his kingdom and returned to it, and was going to reward those who had followed him, on coming to the sheep-butcher Yue, that personage said, 'When our Great King lost his kingdom, I lost my sheep-killing. When his majesty got back his kingdom, I also got back my sheep-killing. My income and rank have been recovered; why speak further of rewarding me?' The king, (on hearing of this reply), said, 'Force him (to take the reward);' but Yue said, 'It was not through any crime of mine that the king lost his kingdom, and therefore I did not dare to submit to the death (which would have been mine if I had remained in the capital). And it was not through any service of mine that he recovered his kingdom, and therefore I do not dare to count myself worthy of any reward from him.' The king (now) asked that the butcher should be introduced to him, but Yue said, 'According to the law of Chu, great reward ought to be given to great service, and the recipient then be introduced to the king; but now my wisdom was not sufficient to preserve the kingdom, nor my courage sufficient to die at the hands of the invaders. When the army of Wu entered, I was afraid of the danger, and got out of the way of the thieves - it was not with a distinct purpose (of loyalty) that I followed the king. And now he wishes, in disregard of the law, and violations of the conditions of our social compact, to see me in court - this is not what I would like to be talked of through the kingdom.' The king said to Zi-qi, the Minister of War, 'The position of the sheep-butcher Yue is low and mean, but his setting forth of what is right is very high; do you ask him for me to accept the place of one of my three most distinguished nobles.' (This being communicated to Yue), he said, 'I know that the place of such a distinguished noble is nobler than a sheep-butcher's stall, and that the salary of 10,000 zhong is more than its profits. But how should I, through my greed of rank and emolument, bring on our ruler the name of an unlawful dispensation of his gifts? I dare not respond to your wishes, but desire to return to my stall as the sheep-butcher.' Accordingly he did not accept (the proffered reward).

In 491 BCE, King Zhao witnessed the inauspicious meteorological phenomenon known as “Clouds like numerous red birds pressing the day to fly” (雲如眾赤鳥, 夾日以飛). Not long afterwards, King Fuchai of Wu, successor of King Hellü, attacked the State of Chen and Chen requested assistance from King Zhao. The king led his troops personally and was killed during a subsequent battle.

== Family ==
King Zhao was married to Zhen Jiang (貞姜), daughter of the Marquess of Qi (齊侯) whilst his mother was Bo Ying (伯嬴). He also had one sister and at least three elder brothers born by concubines, namely Shen (王子申), Jie (王子结) and Qi (王子啟), sometimes known by their courtesy names as Zixi (子西), Ziqi (子期) and Zilü (子闾).

King Zhao of Chu House of Mi Died: 489 BC
Regnal titles
Preceded by King Ping of Chu	King of Chu; 515–489 BC	Succeeded by King Hui of Chu
