= Duke Hui I of Qin =

Ruler of Chinese state of Qin from 500 to 492 BC

Duke Hui of Qin 秦惠公

Ruler of Qin
- Reign: 500–492 BC
- Predecessor: Duke Ai of Qin
- Successor: Duke Dao of Qin
- Died: 492 BC
Posthumous name
- Duke Hui (惠公)
- House: Ying
- Dynasty: Qin
- Father: Duke Yi of Qin (son of Duke Ai)

Duke Hui I of Qin (Chinese: 秦惠公; pinyin: Qín Huì Gōng, died 492 BC), personal name unknown, was a duke of the state of Qin during the Eastern Zhou dynasty. He was the first of the two rulers of Qin with the posthumous name "Duke Hui".

In 501 BC, Duke Ai, Duke Hui's grandfather, died after a reign of 36 years. Duke Hui's father predeceased Duke Ai and was given the posthumous name Duke Yi (秦夷公). Therefore, Duke Hui succeeded his grandfather as the ruler of Qin.

Duke Hui reigned for nine years and died in 492 BC. He was succeeded by his son Duke Dao.

Duke Hui I of Qin House of Ying Died: 492 BC
Regnal titles
Preceded by Duke Ai of Qin	Duke of Qin; 500–492 BC	Succeeded by Duke Dao of Qin
