= Duke Dao of Qin =

Ruler of the Chinese state of Qin from 491 to 477 BC

Duke Dao of Qin 秦悼公

Ruler of Qin
- Reign: 491–477 BC
- Predecessor: Duke Hui I of Qin
- Successor: Duke Ligong of Qin
- Died: 477 BC
Posthumous name
- Duke Dao (悼公)
- House: Ying
- Dynasty: Qin
- Father: Duke Hui I of Qin

Duke Dao of Qin (Chinese: 秦悼公; pinyin: Qín Dào Gōng; died 477 BC), personal name unknown, was a duke of the state of Qin during the Eastern Zhou dynasty.

Duke Dao succeeded his father Duke Hui I, who died in 492 BC, as ruler of Qin. Duke Dao reigned for 15 years and died in 477 BC. He was succeeded by his son Duke Ligong.

Duke Dao of Qin House of Ying Died: 477 BC
Regnal titles
Preceded by Duke Hui I of Qin	Duke of Qin; 491–477 BC	Succeeded by Duke Ligong of Qin
