= Qin (state) =

Chinese state (c. 9th century – 207 BC)

Qin 秦
- c. 9th century BC – 207 BC
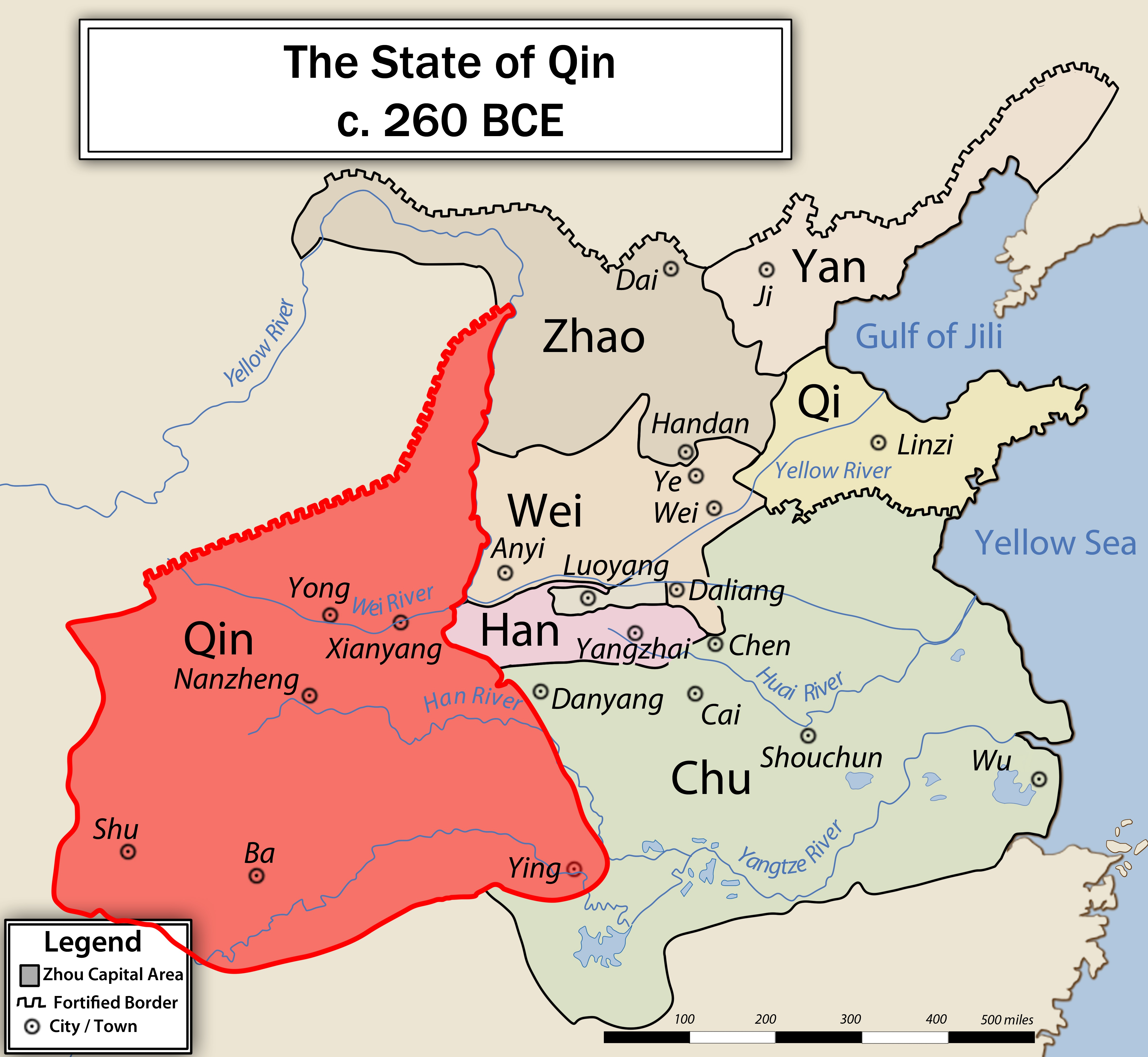
- Capital: Quanqiu (犬丘); Qinyi (秦邑); Qian (汧); Pingyang (平陽); Yong (雍); Jingyang (涇陽); Yueyang; Xianyang
- Common languages: Old Chinese
- Religion: Chinese folk religion; Ancestor veneration
- Government: Monarchy
- History
  - Established: 9th century BC
  - Founded by Feizi: 860 BC?
  - Enfeoffment by Ping of Zhou: 770 BC
  - Declared empire: 221 BC
  - Dissolution: 207 BC
- Currency: Ban Liang coins
Preceded by	Succeeded by
Zhou dynasty	Qin dynasty; Eighteen Kingdoms
- Today part of: China

Qin
- "Qin" in seal script (top) and regular script (bottom) characters
- Chinese: 秦
Transcriptions
Standard Mandarin
- Hanyu Pinyin: Qín
- Bopomofo: ㄑㄧㄣˊ
- Wade–Giles: Ch'in^{2}
- Tongyong Pinyin: Cín
- IPA: [tɕʰǐn]
Wu
- Suzhounese: Zin^{2}
Yue: Cantonese
- Yale Romanization: Chèuhn
- Jyutping: Ceon4
- IPA: [tsʰɵn˩]
Southern Min
- Tâi-lô: Tsîn
Old Chinese
- Baxter–Sagart (2014): *[dz]i[n]

Qin (CHIN, /tʃɪn/, or Ch'in) was an ancient Chinese state during the Zhou dynasty. It is traditionally dated to 897 BC. The state of Qin originated from a reconquest of western lands that had previously been lost to the Xirong. Its location at the western edge of Chinese civilisation allowed for expansion and development that was not available to its rivals in the North China Plain.

After extensive reform during the 4th century BC, Qin emerged as one of the dominant powers among the Seven Warring States. It unified the seven states of China under Qin Shi Huang in 221 BC. This unification established the Qin dynasty, which, despite its short duration, had a significant influence on later Chinese history. Accordingly, the state of Qin before the Qin dynasty was established is also referred to as the "predynastic Qin" or "proto-Qin".

== History ==
=== Founding ===
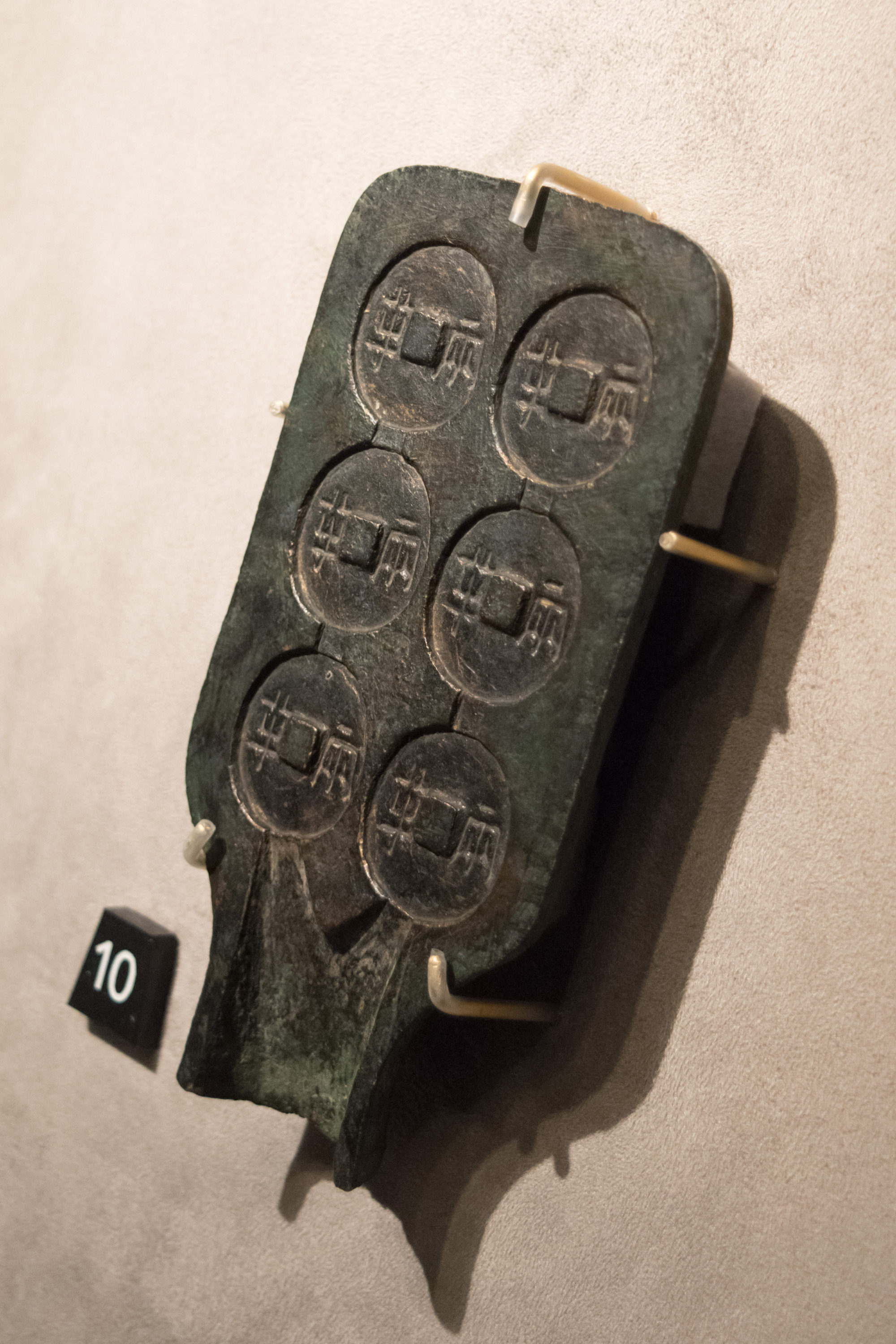
Bronze mold for minting banliang coins, Warring States period (475–221 BC), State of Qin, from an excavation in Qishan County, Baoji, Shaanxi

According to the 2nd-century BC Records of the Grand Historian by Sima Qian, the state of Qin traced its origin to Zhuanxu, one of the legendary Five Emperors in ancient times. One of his descendants, Boyi, was granted the family name of Ying by Emperor Shun. During the Xia and Shang dynasties, the Ying clan split in two: a western branch that migrated across the Ordos Plateau to Quanqiu (犬丘; 'hill of the Quanrong', modern Li County, Gansu), and an eastern branch that settled east of the Yellow River in modern Shanxi. The latter became the ancestors of the rulers of the later state of Zhao.

The western Ying clan at Quanqiu were lords over the Xichui ('western march') region west of Mount Long and served as a buffer state for the Shang dynasty against invasions by the Xirong (also called Rong). One of the Shang, Elai, was killed defending Di Xin during the rebellion led by Ji Fa that established the Zhou dynasty. The Ying clan was, however, allied with the politically influential marquesses of Shen, whom the Zhou monarch relied upon heavily to manage the Rong people. The Ying clan was thus allowed to retain their lands and continued serving as an attached vassal under the Zhou dynasty. Feizi, a younger son of Elai's fourth-generation descendant Daluo, impressed King Xiao of Zhou so much with his horse breeding skills that he was awarded a separate fief in the valley of Qin (modern Qingshui and Zhangjiachuan in Gansu) northeast of Quanqiu, and his seat was named Qinyi (秦邑; Qin's hamlet) in the modern town of Qinting (秦亭). Both branches of the western Ying clan lived in the midst of the Rong tribes, sometimes fighting their armies and sometimes intermarrying with their kings.

Scholars Annette Juliano and Arthur Cotterel have suggested that having a horse-breeder as their ancestor may imply that the Ying family had a partial connection to nomadic tribes. As late as 266 BC, a noble of Wei remarked that they shared customs with the Rong and Beidi tribes. The Central Plains states seemed to hold Qin culture and that of other peripheral states like Yan and Chu in low regard, due to the marginal location of their states. Qin was the second state after Zhao to adopt cavalry tactics from the nomads. Following the collapse of the Zhou dynasty, the Qin state absorbed cultures from two of the Four Barbarians (Rong and Beidi) from the west and north, which made the other warring states view their culture with low esteem. The Qin state was sensitive to cultural discrimination by Central Plains states and attempted to assert their Huaxia identity. In Qin law, mixed-ethnicity offspring were categorised as Huaxia, and they had a preference for importing recruits from the neighbouring state of Jin.

In 842 BC, nobles revolted against the corrupt King Li of Zhou in a coup known as the Compatriot's Rebellion (國人暴動). They overthrew him the following year, leading the country into political turmoil that culminated in the Gonghe Regency. The Xirong tribes seized this opportunity to rebel against the Zhou dynasty, attacking and exterminating the senior branch of the Ying clan at Quanqiu. This left the cadet branch at Qinyi as the only surviving branch of the Ying clan in the west.

After King Xuan of Zhou ascended to the throne in 827 BC, he appointed Qin Zhong, Feizi's great-grandson, as the commander of his forces in the campaign against the Xirong. In 822 BC, Qin Zhong was killed in battle and succeeded by his eldest son, Duke Zhuang. To commemorate Qin Zhong's loyalty, King Xuan summoned Duke Zhuang and his four younger brothers and gave them 7,000 soldiers. The Qin brothers successfully defeated the Rong and recovered their lost patrimony, formerly held by the deceased branch of the Ying clan. King Xuan formally awarded them the territory of Quanqiu. Duke Zhuang then moved his seat from Qinyi to Quanqiu and had three sons.

When Duke Zhuang died in 778 BC, his eldest son Shifu chose to continue fighting the Xirong and avenge their grandfather, turning down his place in the line of succession. As a result, his second son, Duke Xiang, ascended as the clan leader. In 777 BC, Duke Xiang arranged for his younger sister, Mu Ying, to marry a Rong leader named King Feng (豐王) in an apparent attempt to make peace. The following year, Duke Xiang moved the Qin capital eastward from Quanqiu to Qian (汧; modern Long County, Shaanxi). However, Quanqiu soon fell to the Rong again after he left. His older brother Shifu, who led the defense of Quanqiu, was captured by the Rong and was released a year later.

In 771 BC, the Marquess of Shen, in collaboration with the state of Zeng and the Quanrong nomads, attacked and sacked the Zhou capital Haojing, killing King You of Zhou and ending the Western Zhou dynasty. Duke Xiang led his troops to escort King You's son, King Ping, to Luoyi (modern Luoyang), where the new capital city of the Eastern Zhou dynasty was established. In gratitude for Duke Xiang's service, King Ping formally enfeoffed Duke Xiang as a feudal lord and elevated Qin from an 'attached state' (附庸; fùyōng, a minor state with limited self-rule under the authority of another liege-lord) to a major vassal state with full autonomy. He further promised to permanently grant Qin the lands west of Qishan, the former heartland of Zhou, if Qin could expel the Rong tribes that were occupying it. Encouraged by this promise, the following generations of Qin rulers launched several military campaigns against the Rong, eventually expanding their territories far beyond the original lands lost by the Western Zhou dynasty. The Qin state therefore viewed the Zhou rulers King Wen and King Wu as their predecessors and themselves as the legitimate inheritors of their legacy.

=== Spring and Autumn period ===
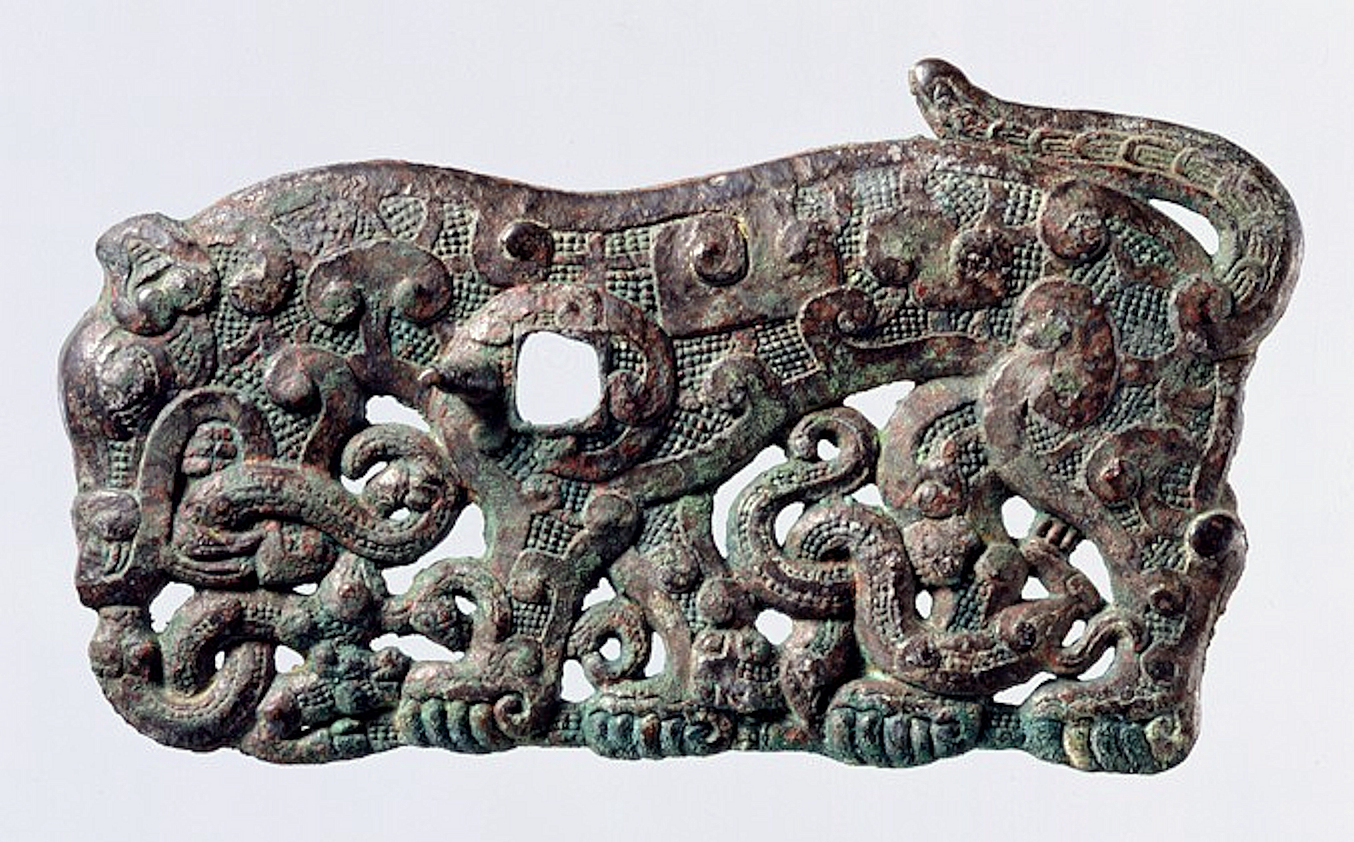
Belt plaque in the shape of a standing wolf, characteristic of nomadic artifacts of southern Ningxia and southeastern Gansu, with characteristic surface decorations in the Qin style. 4th century BC.

During the Spring and Autumn period (722–481 BC), the Qin state's interaction with other central Chinese states remained minimal due to their focus on dealing with the Rong to the west. The exception was their immediate eastern neighbor, Jin, a large vassal of the Zhou. Qin maintained diplomatic relations with Jin through intermarriages between the royal clans, but relations occasionally deteriorated to the point of armed conflict.

In the early reign of Duke Mu of Qin, the Jin state, under the leadership of Duke Xian of Jin, was a formidable power. However, after Duke Xian's death, Jin descended into internal conflict as Duke Xian's sons fought for succession. Duke Hui of Jin, one of the contenders, emerged victorious. However, Jin was struck by a famine in 647 BC, and Duke Hui requested aid from Qin. Duke Mu of Qin, married to Duke Hui's half-sister, sent relief food supplies and agricultural equipment to Jin out of goodwill. However, when Qin experienced a famine the following year, Duke Hui did not reciprocate, leading to diplomatic deterioration and a war in 645 BC. The war ended with Duke Hui's defeat and capture, but Duke Mu later released him after Jin agreed to cede land and form an alliance.

During the battles with Jin, Duke Mu learned that Chong'er, one of Duke Xian's exiled sons, was taking refuge in the state of Chu. After consulting his subjects, Duke Mu sent an emissary to Chu to invite Chong'er and support him in his challenge against his brother, Duke Hui. After Chong'er defeated Duke Hui to become Duke Wen of Jin, he expressed gratitude to Duke Mu, and relations between the two states improved. With stability on his eastern front, Duke Mu seized the opportunity to launch military campaigns against the Rong tribes in the west.

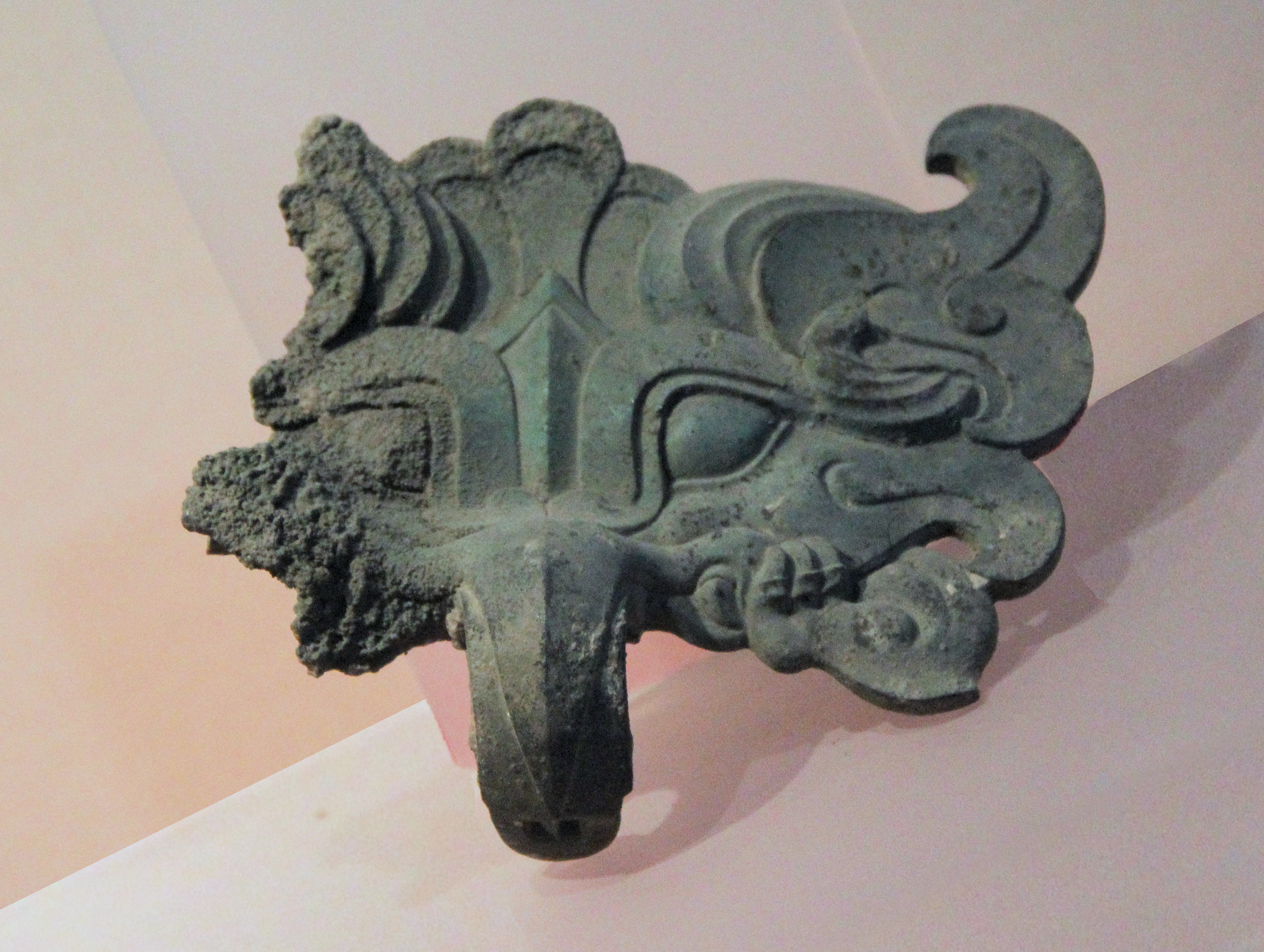
Bronze door knocker, Xianyang Palace

In 630 BC, Qin and Jin agreed to wage war on the state of Zheng, but Duke Mu was lobbied by the Zheng emissary to abandon the alliance. In 627 BC, Duke Mu planned a covert attack on Zheng, but the Qin army retreated after being deceived into believing that Zheng was already prepared for Qin's invasion. By that point, Duke Wen had died and his personal alliance with Duke Mu no longer stood, and his successor Duke Xiang ordered an ambush for the retreating Qin army. The Qin forces were defeated at the Battle of Xiao (near modern Luoning County, Henan); the Qin suffered heavy casualties, and all three of its generals were captured. Three years later, Qin attacked Jin for revenge and achieved a major victory. Duke Mu refused to advance further east after holding a memorial service for those killed in action at the Battle of Xiao and returned to focus on the traditional policy of expanding Qin's dominance in the west. Duke Mu's achievements in Qin's western campaigns and his handling of foreign relations with Jin earned him a position among the Five Hegemons of the Spring and Autumn period.

In a speech pronounced on the eve of a major interstate conference of 546 BC, a Jin leader recognized Qin—along with Jin, Chu and Qi—as one of the four pivotal great powers of the current world.

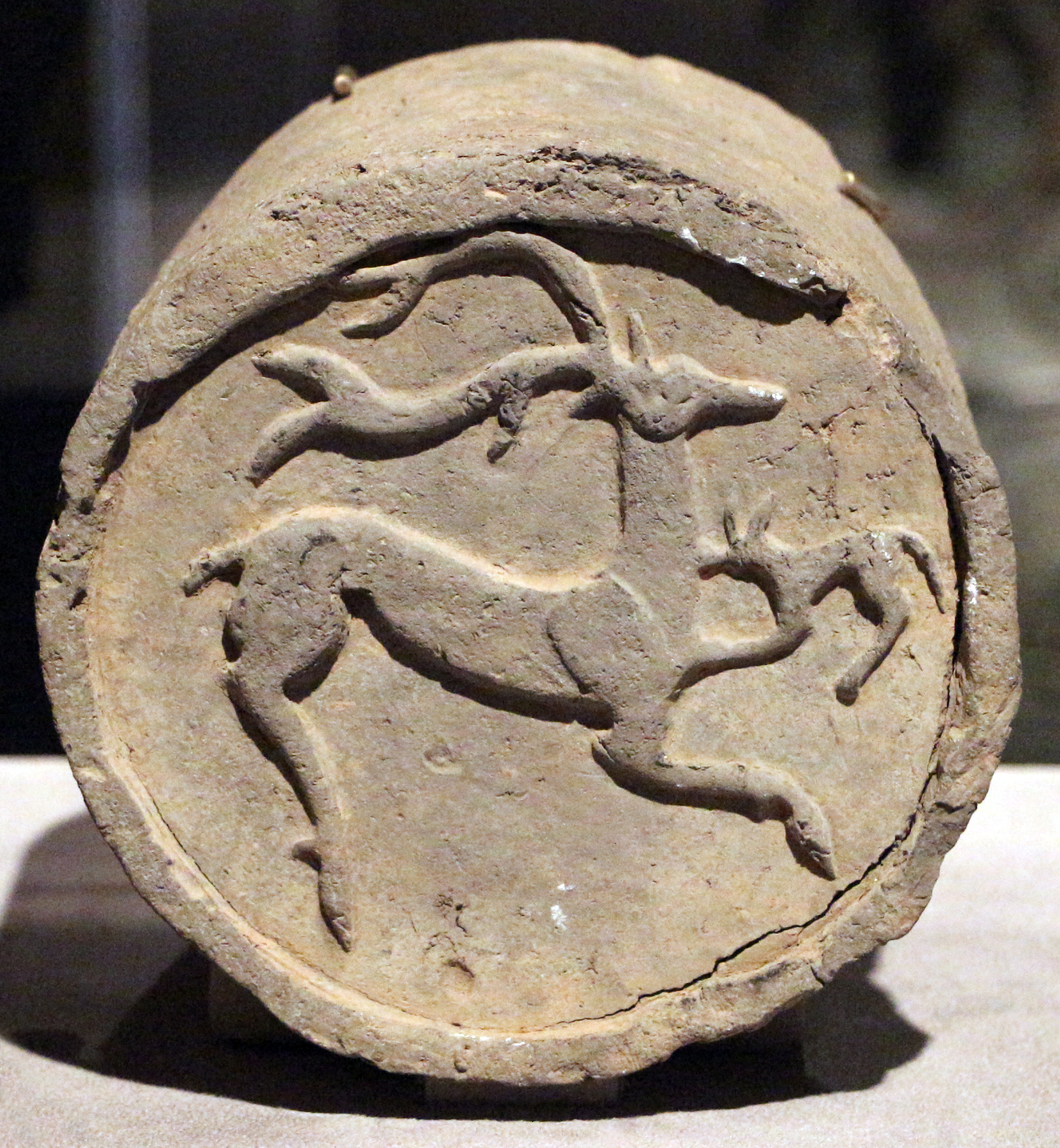
Spring and Autumn period, Qin state, acroterion with deer and roe deer, ca. 770–475 BC, from Doufu, Baoji — Provincial Institute of Archeology of Shaanxi

In 506 BC, King Helü of Wu defeated Chu at the Battle of Boju and captured the Chu capital, Ying (modern Jingzhou). Helü's adviser, Wu Zixu, who had previously been forced into exile by the already deceased King Ping of Chu and craved vengeance for the brutal execution of his father and brother, exhumed King Ping's corpse and posthumously lashed it. This was a great humiliation for the Chu state. Consequently, Shen Baoxu, a Chu official and a former friend of Wu Zixu, travelled to the Qin court and pleaded for assistance from Duke Ai of Qin to recover the capital. After Duke Ai initially refused to help, Shen spent seven days crying in the palace courtyard. Duke Ai was eventually moved by his devotion and agreed to send troops to assist Chu. The poem "No Clothes" (Chinese: 無衣; pinyin: Wú Yī), recorded in the Classic of Poetry, was a battle hymn personally composed by Duke Ai to boost the morale of the Qin troops. In 505 BC, the Qin and Chu armies jointly defeated Wu in several battles, allowing King Zhao of Chu to be restored and return to the recaptured capital.

=== Warring States Period ===
==== Early non-involvement ====
Mozi (460–390 BC) did not list Qin among the powerful states. However, other scattered information about its military exploits indicates that Qin had remained a powerful polity since Duke Mu's rule. Its armies acted, even if infrequently, in the eastern and southeastern parts of the Chinese world, occasionally against the great power of Wu. Although not weak, the overall impact of Qin on the affairs of the Zhou world in the 5th and the early 4th century BC was considerably diminished. There is evidence that this diminished influence was a result of Qin adopting an isolationist policy to avoid entanglement in the wars of the Central Plains, rather than military weakness. Initially, Qin avoided involvement using its protective geography and, responding to growing external threats, gradually turned to intervention in the manner of "defensive imperialism".

During the early Warring States period, its neighbours in the Central Plains began rapidly developing. The Wei state, formed from the partition of Jin, became the most powerful state on Qin's eastern border. Qin largely relied on natural defences such as the Hangu Pass (northeast of modern Lingbao, Henan) and Wu Pass (modern Danfeng County) in the east, to protect its Guanzhong heartland. Between 413 and 409 BC, during the reign of Duke Jian of Qin, the Wei army—led by Wu Qi and supported by Zhao and Han states—attacked Qin and conquered some Qin territories west of the Yellow River.

==== Legalist reforms ====
Qin before the conquest of Sichuan, fifth century BC

In 362 BC, Qin defeated Wei and Han. Following these victories, Qin rulers actively pursued legal, economic, and social reforms. In 361 BC, Duke Xiao ascended to the throne of Qin. He issued an announcement inviting men of talent (including scholars, administrators, theorists, and military experts from other states) to enter Qin and assist him with his reforms, promising rewards of high offices and lands in return.

Among these foreign talents, Shang Yang successfully conducted a series of Legalist reforms in Qin with the support of Duke Xiao, despite facing strong opposition from conservative Qin politicians. Direct primogeniture was abolished, with all commoners granted citizenship rights. Many were resettled in new clusters with a focus on increasing agricultural output. Stringent and strict laws were imposed, with severe punishments being meted out for the slightest of offences; nobility and royalty were not exempt.

Meritocracy was practiced throughout, especially in the military, with soldiers and officers receiving due rewards according to their contributions, regardless of their backgrounds. Previously, the army was under the control of Qin's nobles and was composed of feudal levies. Following Shang Yang's reforms, the aristocracy system was abolished and replaced by a meritocracy, in which ordinary citizens had the same opportunities as nobles to be promoted to high ranks. Additionally, military discipline was strictly enforced, and troops were trained to adapt more effectively to various battle situations. Qin's military strength increased significantly with the full support of the state.

In addition to the effects on Qin's military, Shang Yang's reforms also increased labour for numerous public works projects aimed at enhancing agriculture, and enabled Qin to maintain and supply an active military force of more than a million troops. This achievement could not be matched by any other state, except Chu, during that time. The reforms strengthened Qin economically and militarily, and transformed it into a highly centralised state with an efficient administrative system.

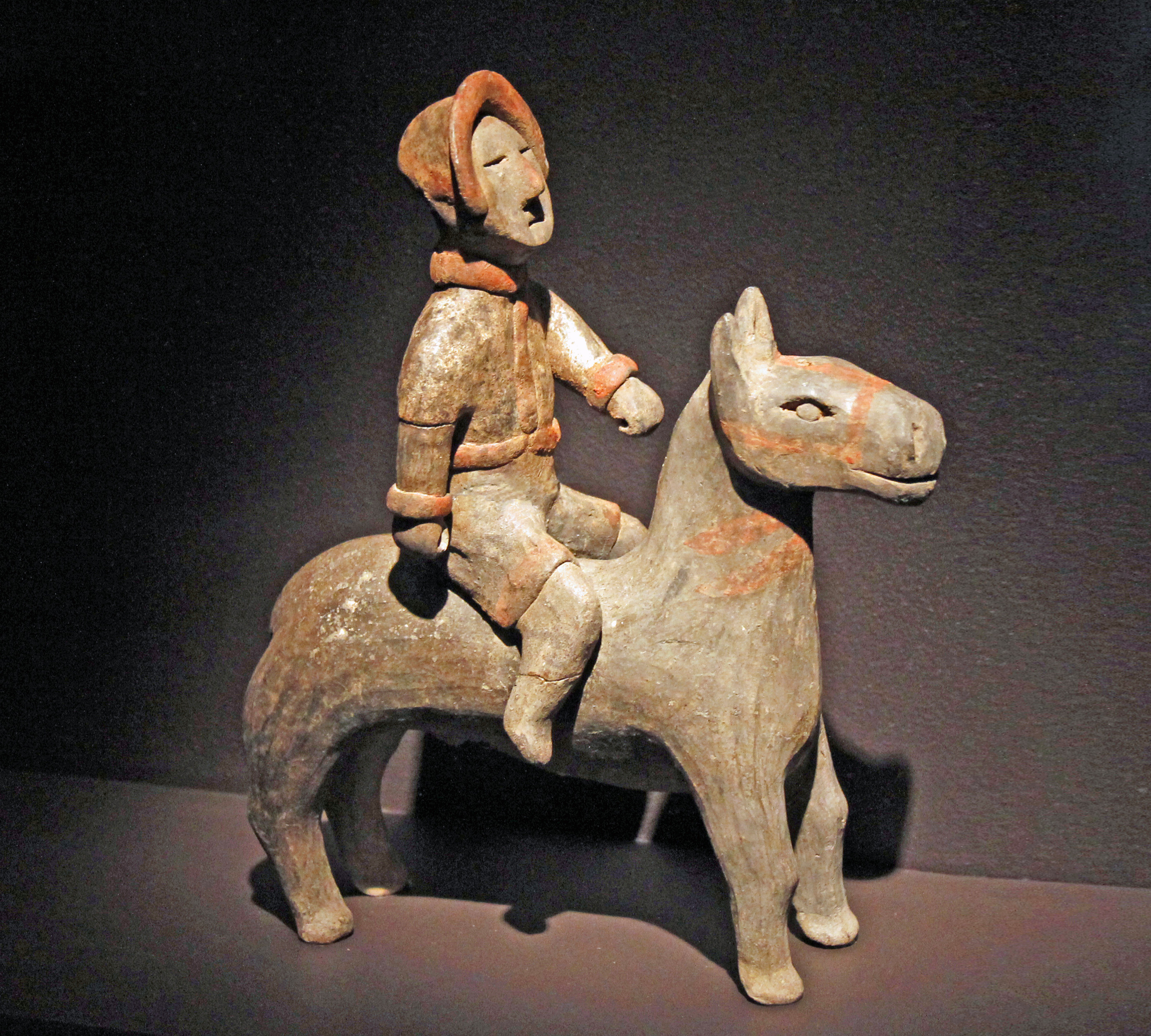
The Taerpo horserider, a Qin state terracotta figurine from a tomb in the Taerpo cemetery near Xianyang in Shaanxi, 4th–3rd century BC. This is the earliest known representation of a cavalryman in China. The outfit is of Central Asian style, probably Scythian, and the rider with his large nose appears to be a foreigner. King Zheng of Qin (246–221 BC) is known to have employed steppe cavalry men in his army, as seen in his Terracotta Army.

Following the death of Duke Xiao, King Huiwen ascended as the new ruler of Qin. He executed Shang Yang by tearing him apart with chariots, citing charges of treason. However, some speculated that the king harboured a personal grudge against Shang, as he had been severely punished for a minor infraction during his adolescence under Shang's reformed system. Despite this, King Huiwen and his successors maintained the reformed systems, which laid the foundation for Qin's rise to prominence among the Seven Warring States in the late fourth century BC.

Animated map of the Warring States period

==== Hegemonic stage ====
In 364 BC, Qin defeated the combined armies of Wei and Han, and King Xian of Zhou, the nominal ruler of China, declared Duke Xian the Hegemon (ba) of China. His successor, Duke Xiao, who ascended the throne in 361 BC, was also appointed hegemon. The Guanzi defines the status of hegemon as intermediate between king and emperor. A text from the late Warring States period describes the hegemon as controlling military forces and commerce of the states under the hegemony, and using court visits as a means of supervision.

After Xiao, the status of hegemon was not officially granted to the kings of Qin, but de facto Qin remained hegemonic until its universal conquest in 221 BC. It seldom suffered defeats and repeatedly crushed other states in at least 15 major campaigns. Memorial on the Abolition of Feudal Lords by Qin official Li Si, dated to 246 BC, described: Through military victories, Qin has, "in the time of the last six kings" (from Xiao in 361 BC to the First Emperor) brought the other states "into submission". By the 240s BC, other states "yielded obeisance to Qin as if they were its commanderies and prefectures". Sima Qian confirmed and dated the beginning of the Qin hegemonic policy from the reign of Xiao's predecessor, Xian (384–361 BC): Since his reign, Qin "gradually swallowed up the six states until, after 100 years or so", the First Emperor conquered them. "For more than one hundred years [before 221 BC], Qin commanded Eight lands and brought the lords of equal rank to its court."

By the late 4th century BC, other states in China became alarmed by Qin's consolidation of power and began forming anti-hegemonic alliances, referred to as Vertical Alliances. Qin repeatedly clashed with these alliances. This pattern continued during the last century of the Warring States. In 318 BC, the states of Wei, Zhao, Han, Yan, and Chu formed such an alliance and attacked Qin, but failed to advance beyond Hangu Pass, and were defeated by counter-attacking Qin forces. The alliance crumbled due to mistrust, suspicion, and a lack of coordination among the five states.

In 316 BC, Qin completed the conquests of the southern states of Ba and Shu, in modern Sichuan. These conquests provided Qin with significant strategic advantages. The lands in the new territories were highly fertile and could be drawn upon for supplies and additional manpower. It was difficult for Qin's rivals to attack Ba and Shu, as the territories were located deep in the mountains upstream on the Yangtze. Simultaneously, Qin's strategic position in Ba and Shu provided it a platform for launching attacks on the Chu state, which was downstream on the Yangtze.

==== Actions against Chu ====
Summary of major events
Year	Events
c. 557 BC	Qin fought with Jin
361 BC	Duke Xiao became ruler of Qin
356 BC	Shang Yang implemented his first set of reforms in Qin
350 BC	Shang Yang implemented his second set of reforms in Qin
338 BC	King Huiwen became ruler of Qin
316 BC	Qin conquered Shu and Ba
293 BC	Qin defeated the allied forces of Wei and Han at the Battle of Yique
260 BC	Qin defeated Zhao at the Battle of Changping
256 BC	Qin ended the Eastern Zhou dynasty
247 BC	Ying Zheng became ruler of Qin
230 BC	Qin conquered Han
228 BC	Qin conquered Zhao
225 BC	Qin conquered Wei
223 BC	Qin conquered Chu
222 BC	Qin conquered Yan, Dai and the Wuyue region
221 BC	Qin conquered Qi and unified China under the Qin dynasty

During the reign of King Huiwen of Qin, the state of Chu to the southeast became a target for Qin's aggression. Although Chu had the largest operation-ready army of the Seven Warring States with more than a million troops, its administrative and military strength was plagued by corruption and divided among the nobles. The Qin strategist Zhang Yi suggested that King Huiwen to pursue Qin's interests at the expense of Chu. Over the following years, Zhang engineered and executed a number of diplomatic plots against Chu, supported by the constant military raids on Chu's north-western border. Chu suffered many defeats in battles against Qin and was forced to cede territories to Qin. King Huai I of Chu was furious and ordered a military campaign against Qin, but he was tricked by Zhang Yi into breaking diplomatic ties with his allies, and his angered allies joined Qin in inflicting a crushing defeat on Chu. In 299 BC, King Huai I was tricked into attending a diplomatic conference in Qin, where he was captured and held hostage until his death. In the meantime, Qin launched several attacks on Chu and eventually sacked the Chu capital city of Chen (陳; modern Jiangling County, Hubei). The crown prince of Chu fled east and was crowned King Qingxiang of Chu in the new capital city of Shouchun (壽春; modern Shou County, Anhui).

==== Wars against Zhao, Han, and Wei ====
In the five decades following King Huiwen's death, King Zhaoxiang of Qin shifted his focus to the central plains after victories in the south against Chu. In the early years of King Zhaoxiang's reign, the Marquis of Rang (穰侯) served as Qin's chancellor and actively advocated for military campaigns against the state of Qi in the far eastern part of China. However, the marquis had personal motives, intending to use Qin's formidable military to secure his own fief in Qi territories, as these lands were not directly linked to Qin and would not be under the Qin government's direct administration.

King Zhaoxiang's foreign adviser, Fan Sui, counselled the king to abandon these fruitless campaigns against distant states. King Zhaoxiang heeded this advice and altered Qin's foreign policy to foster good diplomatic relations with the distant states of Yan and Qi, while focusing on attacking nearby Zhao, Han, and Wei. As a result, Qin began to launch constant attacks on Han and Wei over the subsequent decades, conquering several territories in its campaigns. By then, Qin's territories had expanded beyond the eastern shore of the Yellow River, and Han and Wei were reduced to the status of "buffers" for Qin against the other states in the east.

In 265 BC, Qin launched a massive invasion on Han and forced Han to cede its territory of Shangdang (上黨; modern Shanxi). However, Han offered Shangdang to Zhao instead, leading to a conflict between Qin and Zhao for control of Shangdang. Qin and Zhao engaged in the three-year-long Battle of Changping, followed by another three-year siege by Qin of Zhao's capital city of Handan. The conflict at Changping was seen as a power struggle, as both sides pitted their forces against each other not only on the battlefield, but also domestically. Although Qin had an abundance of resources and vast manpower, it had to enlist every man above the age of 15 for war-related duties, ranging from front-line service to logistics and agriculture. King Zhaoxiang even personally directed his army's supply lines. Qin's eventual victory in 260 BC was attributed to its use of schemes to stir up internal conflict in Zhao, which led to the replacement of Zhao's military leaders.

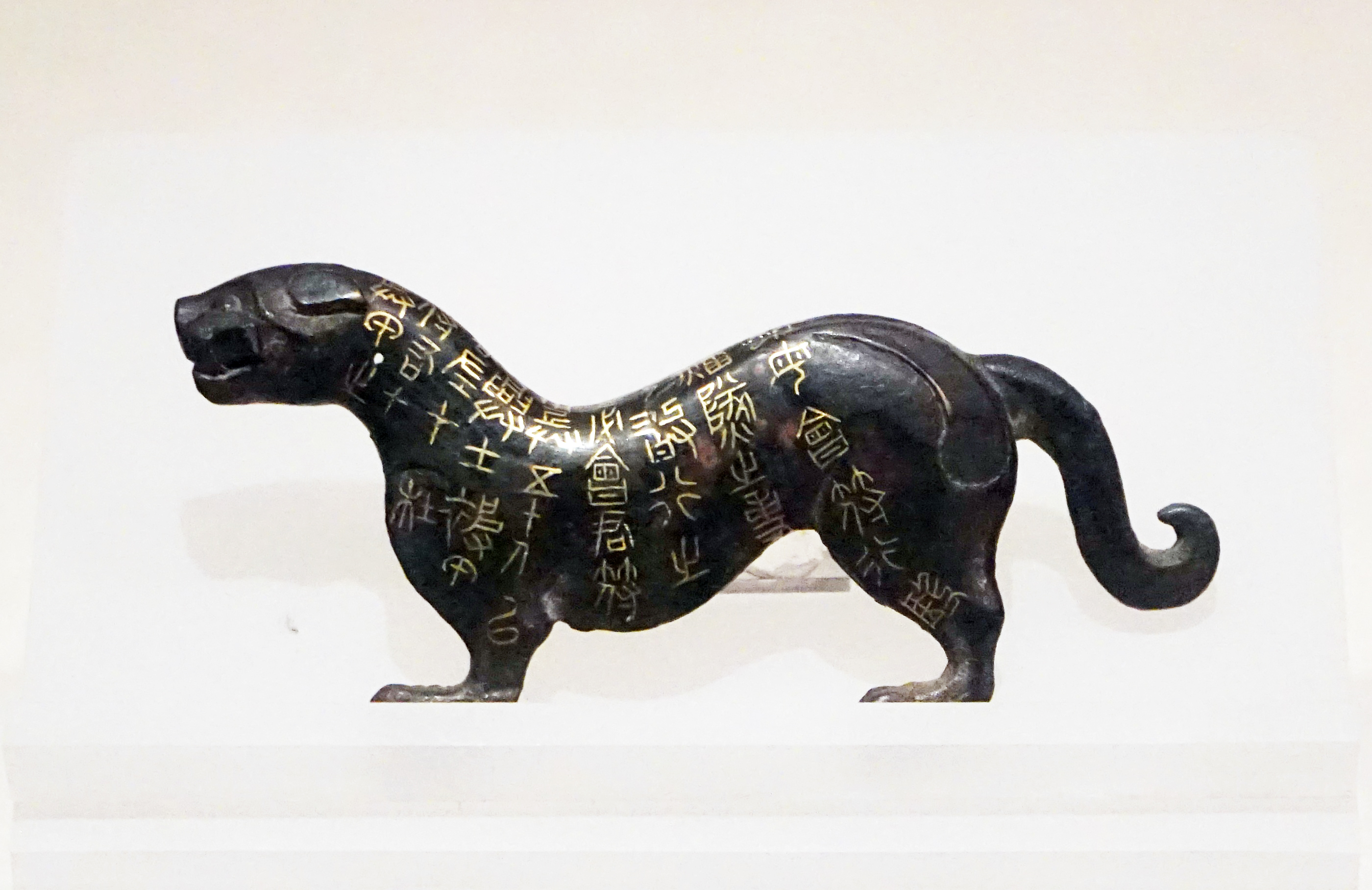
Bronze tiger-shaped tally. The Tiger Tally was a kind of special token granted to the commander to confer military authority and legitimize orders.

Following the Qin victory at the Battle of Changping, the Qin commander, Bai Qi, ordered the 400,000 prisoners of war from Zhao to be executed by burying them alive. Subsequently, the Qin forces marched on the Zhao capital city of Handan in an attempt to conquer Zhao completely. However, the Qin troops were unable to capture Handan as they were already exhausted and also because the Zhao forces put up fierce resistance. King Xiaocheng of Zhao offered six cities to Qin as a peace offer, and King Zhaoxiang of Qin accepted the offer after being persuaded by Fan Sui. Within Zhao, many officials strongly opposed King Xiaocheng's decision to give up the cities, and subsequent delays caused the siege of Handan to be prolonged until 258 BC. Meanwhile, Bai Qi was consecutively replaced by Wang Xi, Wang Ling, and Zheng Anping as the Qin commander of the siege.

In 257 BC, Qin was still unable to penetrate Handan after besieging it for three years, and Zhao requested aid from the neighbouring states of Wei and Chu. Wei was hesitant to help Zhao initially but launched an attack on Qin after seeing that Qin was already exhausted after years of war. The Qin forces crumbled and retreated, and Zheng Anping surrendered. The combined forces of Wei and Chu continued to pursue the retreating Qin army, and Wei managed to retake part of its original lands that had been lost to Qin earlier.

==== Infrastructural works ====
The success of Qin is partly attributed to the industriousness of its people. The Qin kings authorised numerous state development projects, including significant public works such as irrigation canals and defensive structures. In the middle of the 3rd century, Zheng Guo, a hydraulic engineer from the state of Han, was dispatched to Qin to advise King Zhaoxiang on the construction of irrigation canals. Qin had a predilection for constructing large-scale canals, as evidenced by its irrigation system for the Min River. King Zhaoxiang approved Zheng Guo's proposal to construct an even larger canal. The project was completed in 264 and the canal was named in honour of Zheng. Qin benefited from the project as it became one of the most fertile states in China due to the efficient irrigation system, and also because it could now muster more troops as a result of increased agricultural yield.

=== Unification ===
State of Qin – bronzeware script, c. 800 BC

In 247, the 13-year-old Ying Zheng became King of Qin following the sudden death of King Zhuangxiang. However, Ying Zheng did not fully wield state power until 238, after eliminating his political rivals, Lü Buwei and Lao Ai. Ying formulated a plan for conquering the other six states and unifying China, with assistance from Han Fei, Li Si and Wei Liao.

Legalist scholar Han Fei (c. 280-233 BC) expanded upon Shang Yang's theories and amalgamated them with those of Shen Buhai and Shen Dao, forming the core philosophies of Legalism. According to Han Fei, for a long time Qin was reluctant to conquer and annex other states. Three times Qin defeated Vertical Alliances, each time could perform universal conquest, but each time Qin State Councilors prevented this conquest from the King of Qin, made peace with the defeated powers, withdrew the troops, and allowed the defeated powers to recover, form another Vertical Alliance, and attack Qin. Three times universal rule was missed "due to the incompetence of the State Councilors" and each time led to disastrous consequences. Han Fei was executed in 233 BC, before the universal conquest. Hence, his account is not a post-factum reflection.

The universal conquest had been advocated by both Qin Chief Councilor, Li Si, and Han Fei as preventive war, to prevent the formation of a new Vertical Alliance. In 246 BC, Li Si composed "Memorial on the Abolition of Feudal Lords" for his King Cheng who would conquer China and become the First Emperor. "Now, says the Memorial, with the might of Qin and the victories of Your Highness, at one stroke, like sweeping off the dust from a kitchen stove, the feudal lords can be annihilated, imperial rule can be established, and unification of the world can be brought about... If Your Highness allows it to slip away and does not press the advantage in haste, the feudal lords will revive their strength and organize themselves into an anti-Qin alliance."

In 234 BC, Han Fei warned King Cheng of an organizing Vertical Alliance. Uniting the combined first-class forces of Qi and Zhao, the Vertical Alliance would mobilize 20,000 chariots, and Qin would become a "target for the armies of the world!" By this time, State Councilors, led by Li Si, had become convinced that the hegemonic strategy as practiced since 364 BC does not work. Li Si stated that the "might of Qin" is sufficient for universal conquest. This was not news for a King of Qin. Since 318 BC, Qin repeatedly defeated Vertical Alliances and conquered their cities. New was the position of State Councillors. This time the King of Qin was not checked and balanced by them and was free to launch a universal conquest.

In 230, Qin attacked Han, the weakest of the Seven Warring States, and succeeded in conquering Han within a year. Since 236, Qin had been launching several assaults on Zhao, which had been devastated by its calamitous defeat at the Battle of Changping three decades earlier. Although Qin faced strong resistance from the Zhao forces, led by General Li Mu, it still managed to defeat the Zhao army by using a ploy to sow discord between King Qian of Zhao and Li Mu, leading King Qian to order Li Mu's execution and replace Li with the less competent Zhao Cong. Zhao eventually fell to Qin in 228 after the capital city of Handan was taken. However, a Zhao noble managed to escape with remnant forces and proclaim himself King in Dai. Dai fell to Qin six years later.

State of Qin (small seal script, 220 BC)

After the fall of Zhao, Qin turned its attention towards Crown Prince Dan of Yan, who had sent Jing Ke to assassinate Ying Zheng; the assassination attempt failed, and Qin used that as a pretext to attack Yan. Yan lost to Qin at a battle on the eastern bank of the Yi River in 226, and King Xi of Yan fled with remnant forces to Liaodong. Qin attacked Yan again in 222 and annexed Yan completely. In 225, the Qin army, led by Wang Ben, invaded Wei and besieged Wei's capital city of Daliang for three months. Wang redirected the waters of the Yellow River and the Hong Canal to flood Daliang; King Jia of Wei surrendered, and Wei was conquered.

In 224, Qin prepared for an attack on Chu, its most powerful rival among the six states. During a discussion between Ying Zheng and his subjects, the veteran general Wang Jian claimed that the invasion force needed to be at least 600,000 strong, but the younger general Li Xin thought that 200,000 men would suffice. Ying Zheng put Li Xin in command of the Qin army to attack Chu. The Chu defenders, led by Xiang Yan, took Li Xin's army by surprise and defeated the Qin invaders. The defeat was deemed the greatest setback for Qin in its wars to unify China. Ying Zheng put Wang Jian in command of the 600,000-strong army as he had requested and ordered Wang to lead another attack on Chu. Wang scored a major victory against the Chu forces in 224, and Xiang Yan was killed in action. The following year, Qin pushed on and captured Chu's capital city of Shouchun, bringing an end to Chu's existence. In 222, the Qin army advanced southward and annexed the Wuyue region (modern Zhejiang and Jiangsu).

By 221, Qi was the only rival state left. Qin advanced into the heartland of Qi via a southern detour, avoiding direct confrontation with the Qi forces on Qi's western border and arrived swiftly at Qi's capital city of Linzi. The Qi forces were taken by surprise and surrendered without putting up resistance. Following the fall of Qi in 221 BC, China was unified under the rule of Qin. Ying Zheng declared himself "Qin Shi Huang" (meaning "First Emperor of Qin"), founded the Qin dynasty, and became the first sovereign ruler of a united China.

== Culture and society ==
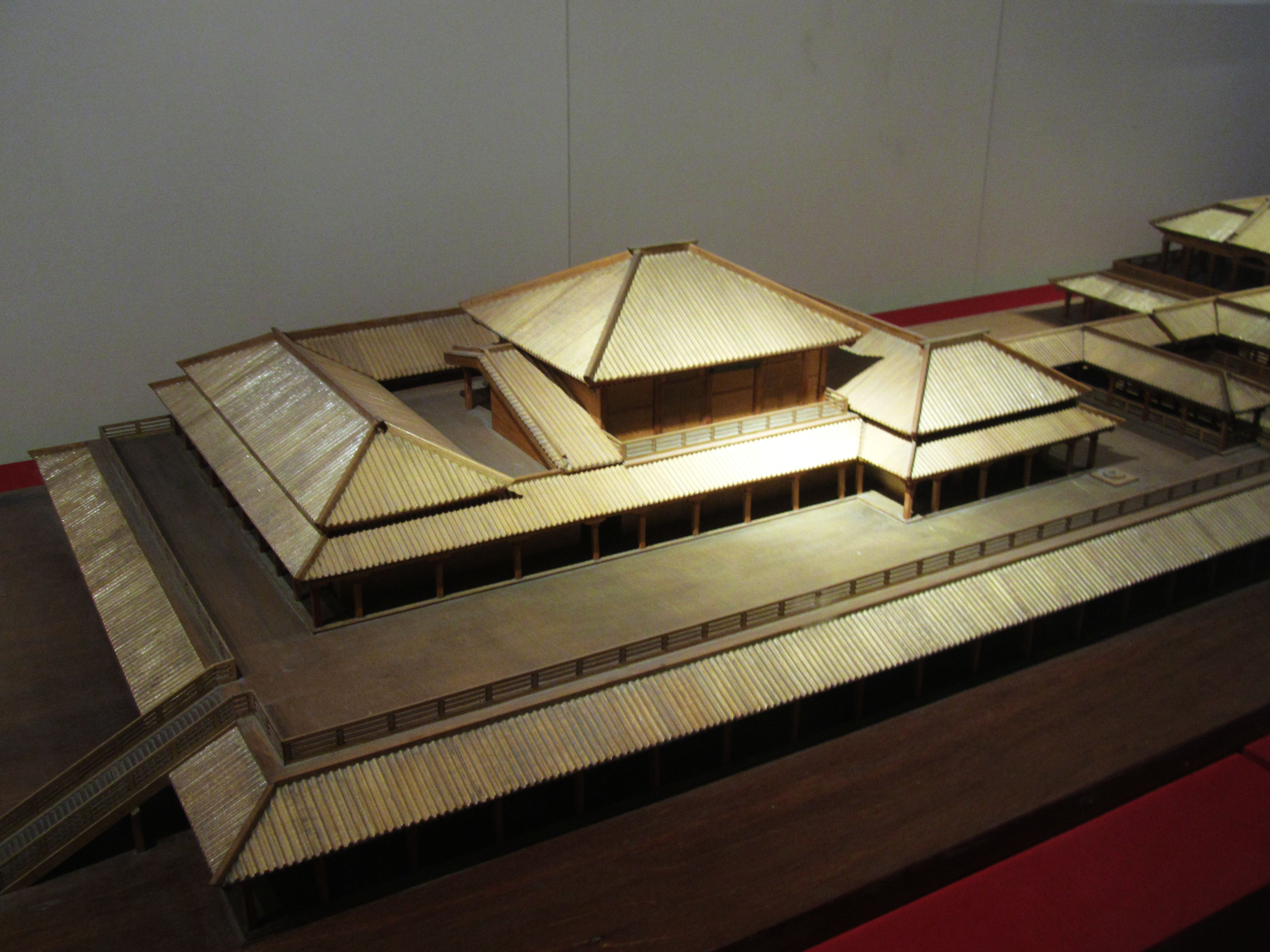
Model of the Site of Xianyang Palace, palace of the capital of the Qin state

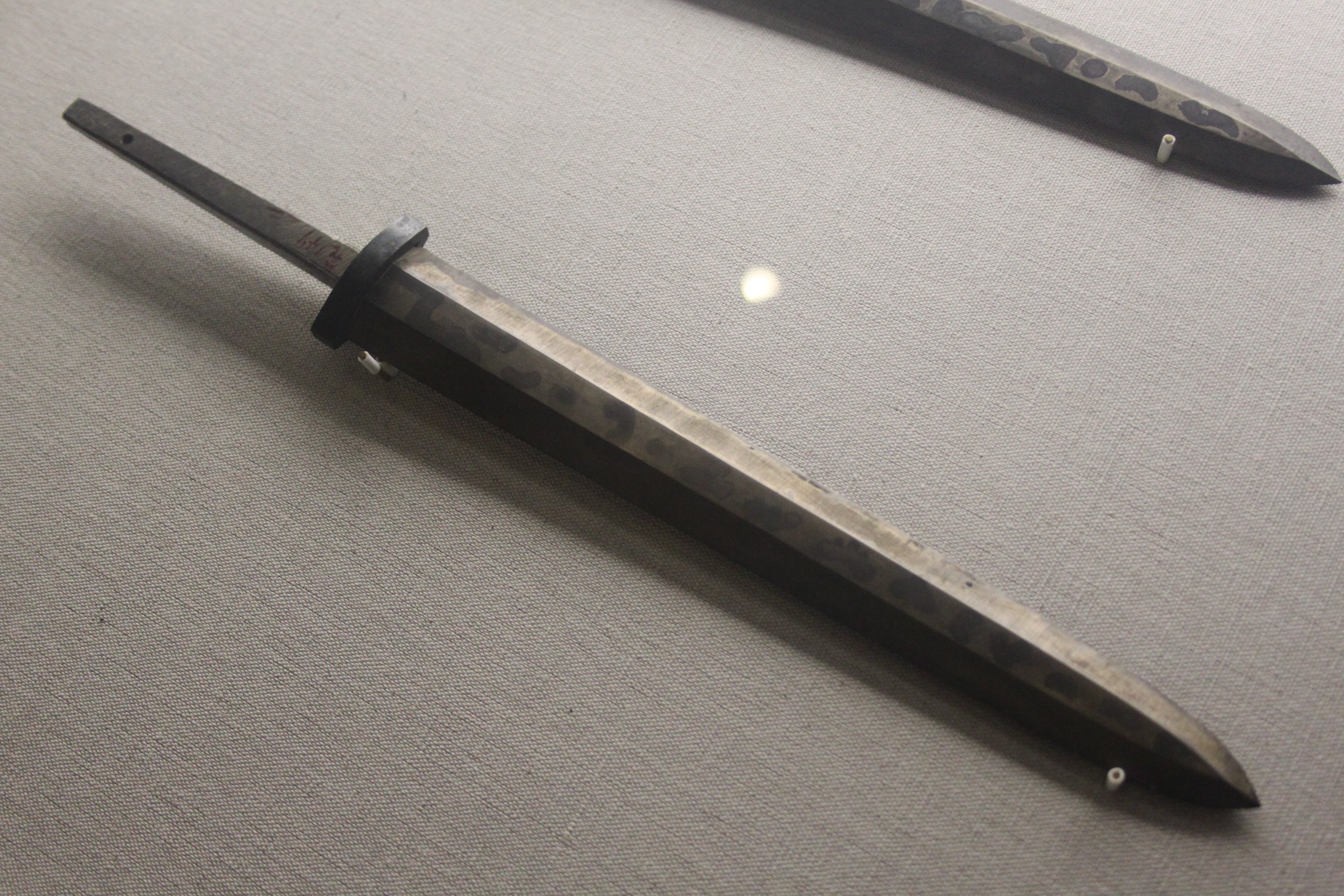
Bronze lance head, Qin

Before Qin unified China, each state had its own customs and culture. According to the Yu Gong or Tribute of Yu, composed in the 4th or 5th century BC and included in the Book of Documents, there were nine distinct cultural regions of China, which are described in detail in this book. The work focuses on the travels of the titular sage, Yu the Great, throughout each of the regions. Other texts, predominantly military, also discussed these cultural variations.

One of these texts was the Wuzi, written in response to a query by Marquis Wu of Wei on how to cope with the military threat posed by competing states. Wu Qi, the author of the work, declared that the government and nature of the people were reflective of the terrain they live in. Of Qin, he said:

The nature of Qin's troops is to disperse so that each unit fights their own respective battles.

— Wuzi

The people of Qin are ferocious by nature and their terrain is treacherous. The government's decrees are strict and impartial. The rewards and punishments are clear. Qin soldiers are brave and high in morale so that they are able to scatter and engage in individual combat. To strike at Qin's army, we must entice various groups with small benefits; the greedy will abandon their general to give chase. We can then capitalize on this opportunity by hunting each group down individually and then capturing the generals that have been isolated. Finally, we must array our army to ambush their commander.

— Wuzi

According to Wu, the character of the populace is a consequence of the government, which in turn is a result of the ruggedness of the terrain. Wu expounds upon each of the states in this manner.

Following a visit to Qin in 264, the Confucian philosopher Xun Kuang observed that Qin society was "simple and unsophisticated", and its people held their officials in awe but were entirely devoid of Confucian literati. Despite being disliked by many Confucians of its time for "dangerously lacking in Confucian scholars", Confucian Xun Kuang wrote of the later Qin that "its topographical features are inherently advantageous", and that its "manifold natural resources gave it remarkable inherent strength. Its people were unspoiled and exceedingly deferential; its officers unfailingly respectful, earnest, reverential, loyal, and trustworthy; and its high officials public-spirited, intelligent, and assiduous in the execution of the duties of their position. Its courts and bureaus functioned without delays and with such smoothness that it was as if there were no government at all."

In his Petition against driving away foreigners (諫逐客書), Li Si mentioned that the guzheng and percussion instruments made of pottery and tiles were characteristic of Qin music.

== Rulers ==
List of Qin rulers based on the Records of the Grand Historian with corrections by Han Zhaoqi:

Title	Name	Reign	Relationship	Notes
Feizi	Ying Feizi	d. 858 BC	son of Daluo, fifth generation descendant of Elai	enfeoffed at Qin by King Xiao of Zhou
Marquis of Qin	unknown	857–848 BC	son of Feizi	noble title given by later generations
Gongbo	unknown	847–845 BC	son of Marquis of Qin	
Qin Zhong	unknown	844–822 BC	son of Gongbo	
Duke Zhuang	Qi	821–778 BC	son of Qin Zhong	noble title given by later generations
Duke Xiang	Kai	777–766 BC	son of Duke Zhuang	first ruler to be granted nobility rank
Duke Wen	unknown	765–716 BC	son of Duke Xiang	
Duke Xian	Li	715–704 BC	grandson of Duke Wen	often mistakenly called Duke Ning (秦寧公)
Chuzi I	Man 曼	703–698 BC	son of Duke Xian	
Duke Wu	Shuo	697–678 BC	son of Duke Xian	
Duke De	Jia	677–676 BC	son of Duke Xian, younger brother of Duke Wu	
Duke Xuan	Tian	675–664 BC	son of Duke De	
Duke Cheng	Zai	663–660 BC	son of Duke De, younger brother of Duke Xuan	
Duke Mu	Renhao 任好	659–621 BC	son of Duke De, younger brother of Duke Cheng	
Duke Kang	Ying 罃	620–609 BC	son of Duke Mu	
Duke Gong	Dao 稻	608–604 BC	son of Duke Kang	
Duke Huan	Rong 榮	603–577 BC	son of Duke Gong	
Duke Jing	Shi 石	576–537 BC	son of Duke Huan	
Duke Ai	Ji	536–501 BC	son of Duke Jing	
Duke Hui I	Ning	500–492 BC	grandson of Duke Ai	
Duke Dao	Pan	491–477 BC	son of Duke Hui I	
Duke Ligong	Ci	476–443 BC	son of Duke Dao	
Duke Zao	Xin	442–429 BC	son of Duke Li	
Duke Huai	Feng	428–425 BC	son of Duke Li, younger brother of Duke Zao	
Duke Ling	Su	424–415 BC	grandson of Duke Huai	alternative title Duke Suling (秦肅靈公)
Duke Jian	Daozi	414–400 BC	son of Duke Huai, uncle of Duke Ling	
Duke Hui II	Ren	399–387 BC	son of Duke Jian	
Chuzi II	Chang 昌	386–385 BC	son of Duke Hui II	alternative titles Duke Chu (秦出公), Shaozhu (秦少主), and Xiaozhu (秦小主)
Duke Xian	Shixi or Lian 師隰、連	384–362 BC	son of Duke Ling	alternative titles Duke Yuanxian (秦元獻公) and King Yuan (秦元王)
Duke Xiao	Quliang 渠梁	361–338 BC	son of Duke Xian	alternative title King Ping (秦平王)
King Huiwen	Si 駟	337–311 BC	son of Duke Xiao	alternative title King Hui (惠王); first Qin ruler to adopt the title of "King" in 325 BC
King Wu	Dang 蕩	310–307 BC	son of King Huiwen	alternative titles King Daowu (秦悼武王) and King Wulie (秦武烈王)
King Zhaoxiang	Ze or Ji 則、稷	306–251 BC	son of King Huiwen, younger brother of King Wu	alternative title King Zhao (昭王)
King Xiaowen	Zhu 柱	250 BC	son of King Zhaoxiang	known as Lord Anguo (安國君) before becoming king
King Zhuangxiang	Zichu 子楚	250–247 BC	son of King Xiaowen	alternative title King Zhuang (秦莊王); original name Yiren (異人)
Shi Huangdi	Zheng 政	246–221 BC	son of King Zhuangxiang	King of Qin 246–221 BC; Emperor of the Qin dynasty 221–210 BC

== Astronomy ==
Qin is represented by two stars, Theta Capricorni ('first star of Qin') and 30 Capricorni ('second star of Qin'), in Twelve States asterism. Qin is also represented by the star Delta Serpentis in the Right Wall asterism, part of the Heavenly Market enclosure (see Chinese constellations).
