= Liao of Wu =

King of Chinese state of Wu from 526 to 515 BC

Liao

King of Wu
- Reign: c. 526 – c. 515 BC
- Predecessor: Yumei
- Successor: Helü
- Died: c. 515 BC

Liao, King of Wu (Chinese: 吳王僚; died 515 BC), also named Zhouyu (州于) in Spring and Autumn Annals of Wu and Yue, was the 23rd king of the state of Wu in the Spring and Autumn period.

== Biography ==
Liao was a grandson of King Shoumeng through his son King Yumei according to the Zuo Zhuan and Shiji. However, the Gongyang Zhuan claims that Liao was a shu son of King Shoumeng.

He took the throne in 526 BC. During his time as king he led several battles against the state of Chu. In 518 BC, he conquered the fortified Chu city of Zhongli. He was assassinated by Zhuan Zhu during a function organised by Prince Guang, grandson of King Shoumeng (Note: His parentage is not clear either. Shiji claims that his father was King Zhufan, while the Gongyang Zhuan claims that his father was King Yumei. Later annotations of the Zuo Zhuan and the Shiji, quoting the Shiben, take the latter view.). Prince Guang then seized the throne for himself and became King Helü of Wu.

== Notes ==
Regnal titles
Preceded by Yumei	King of Wu; 526–515 BC	Succeeded by Helü
