= Helü of Wu =

King of Chinese state of Wu from 514 to 496 BC

Helü

King of Wu
- Reign: c. 514 – c. 496 BC
- Predecessor: Liao
- Successor: Fuchai
- Born: Guang
- Died: c. 496 BC
- Issue: Fuchai; Bo; Shan
- Father: Yumei

Helü of Wu
- Traditional Chinese: 闔閭
- Simplified Chinese: 阖闾
Transcriptions
Standard Mandarin
- Hanyu Pinyin: Hélǘ
- Wade–Giles: Ho-lü

Helu
- Traditional Chinese: 闔廬
- Simplified Chinese: 阖庐
Transcriptions
Standard Mandarin
- Hanyu Pinyin: Hélú
- Wade–Giles: Ho-lu

Helü or Helu was king of the state of Wu from 514 to 496 BC, toward the end of the Spring and Autumn period of ancient China. His given name was Guang (Chinese: 光); he was initially known as Prince Guang.

== Life ==
Prince Guang was the son of King Yumei, and the nephew of King Liao. (Note: Records of the Grand Historian, cited in Nienhauser.) He welcomed the Chu exile Wu Zixu into his entourage and, when he sought to usurp the throne of Wu, was introduced by him to Zhuan Zhu. Zhuan assassinated King Liao in 515 BC and the prince became King Helü. The king assigned Wu Zixu to lead the design and building of his "great city", which forms the basis of Suzhou's present old town.

In 506 BC, Helü, with the help of Wu Zixu and Sun Tzu, the author of The Art of War, launched major offensives against the state of Chu. They prevailed in five battles, one of which was the Battle of Boju, and conquered the capital Ying. During the sack of the capital, Helü attempted to sexually assault the Dowager Queen, but she fought him off with a knife and remonstrated with him, leading to Helü leaving in shame. Chu managed to ask the state of Qin for help, and after he was defeated by Qin, the vanguard general of Wu troops, Fugai, a younger brother of Helü, led a rebellion. After beating Fugai, Helü was forced to leave Chu. Fugai later retired to Chu and settled there.

In 496 BC, upon hearing that Yunchang of Yue had died, he launched an invasion of Yue, but was injured and subsequently died from his injuries while telling his son to avenge him. His son, Fuchai, succeeded him in 495 BC. Fuchai would later annex Yue and capture Yue's King Goujian. Helü had two other sons named Bo and Shan. Bo was initially his heir but died before him.

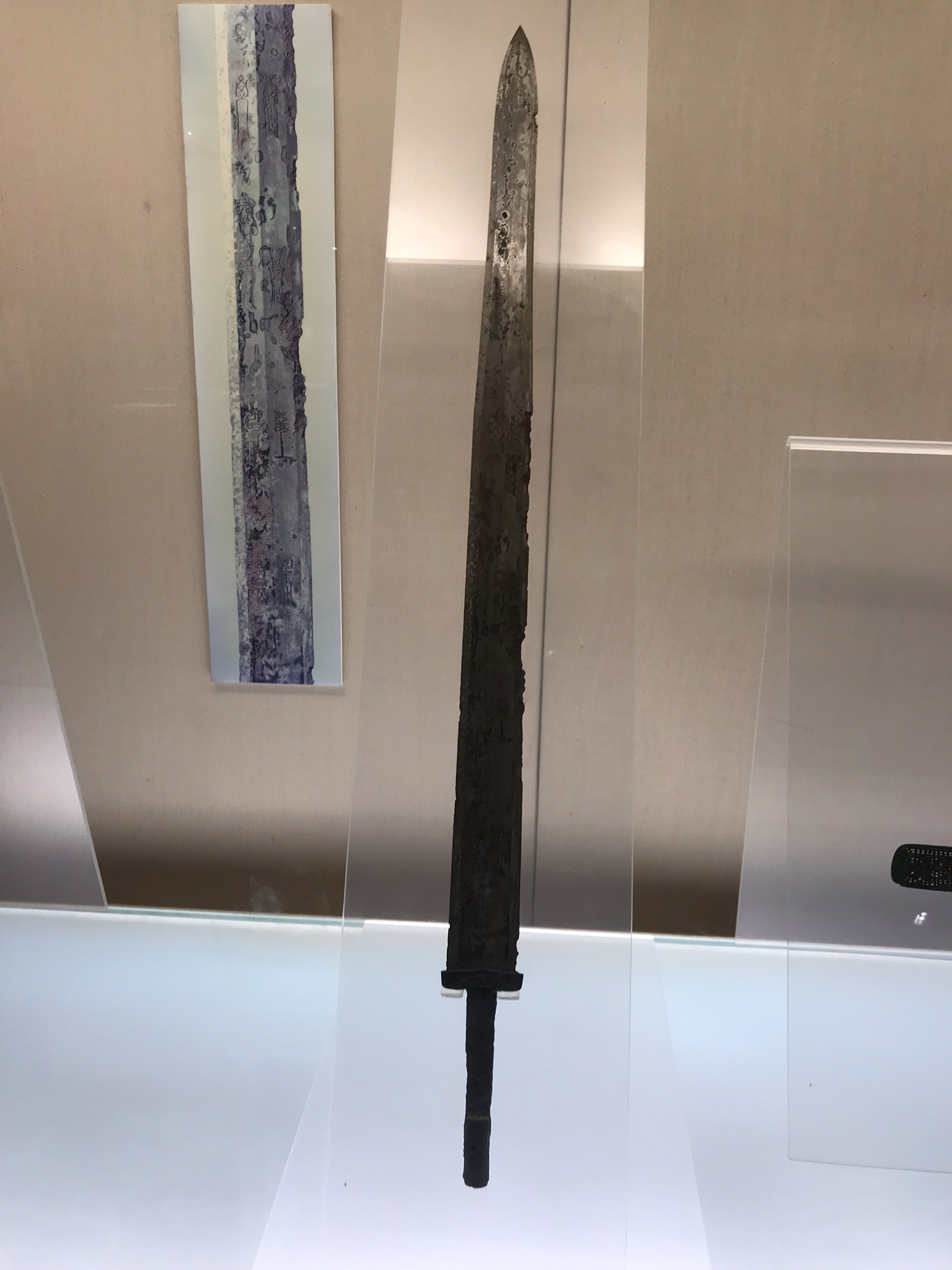
Sword from the tomb of king Helü. The inscription on the blade reads "Made for the personal use of lord Guang of Wu" (攻吾王光 自作用僉). Kept in Shanghai Museum.

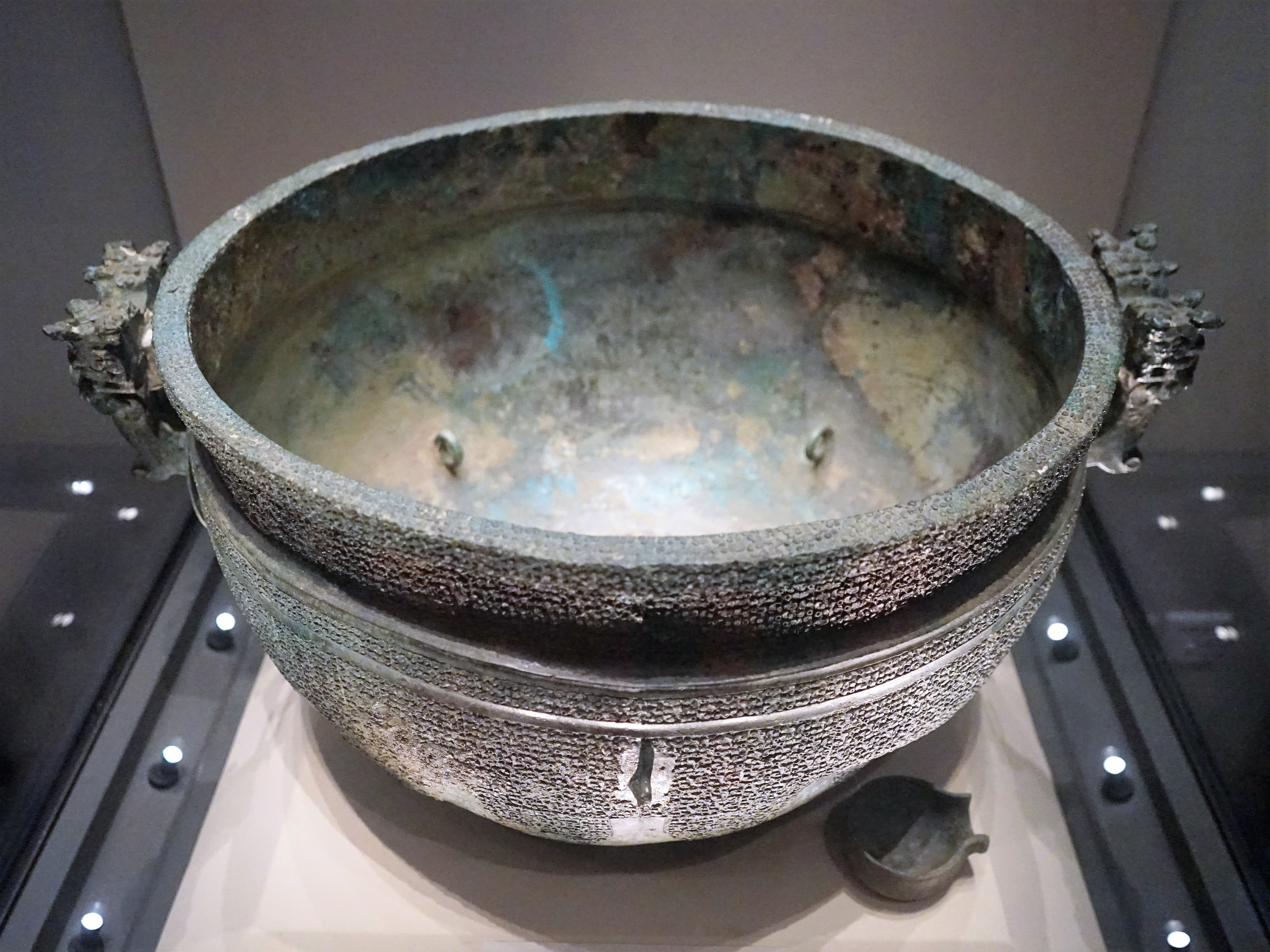
The bronze Wu Wang Guang Jian ("Prince Guang of Wu's Basin"). The inscription inside records that Helü commissioned it for his daughter's dowry and provides evidence of a political marriage between families of the Wu and Chu states.

== Literary sources ==
- Records of the Grand Historian
- Gailu text presenting the dialogue between Helü and Wu Zixu, one of the 8 texts from the Tomb 247 (202-186 BCE) excavated at Zhangjiashan, Jingzhou, Hubei, in 1983. The text is paralleled by a Dunhuang manuscript which attributes the conversation to Duke Jing of Qi and Yan Ying.

Regnal titles
Preceded by Liao	King of Wu; 514–496 BC	Succeeded by Fuchai
