= King Ping of Chu =

King of Chu from 528 BC to 516 BC

King Ping of Chu 楚平王

King of Chu
- Reign: 528–516 BC
- Predecessor: Xiong Bi
- Successor: King Zhao
- Died: 516 BC
- Spouse: Bo Ying
- Issue: Xiong Shen (熊申); Xiong Jian (熊建); Xiong Jie (熊結); Xiong Qi (熊啓); King Zhao; Xiong Biwo (熊畀我)
Names
- Ancestral name: Mǐ (羋); Lineage name: Xióng (熊); Given name: initially Qìjí (棄疾), later Jū (居)
Posthumous name
- King Jingping (景平王 or 競坪王) or King Jingpu (競埔王)
- House: Mi
- Dynasty: Chu
- Father: King Gong

King Ping of Chu (Chinese: 楚平王; pinyin: Chǔ Píng Wáng), personal name Xiong Ju, was king of the Chu state, one of five hegemons during the Spring and Autumn period, from 528 BC to 516 BC. He was a son of King Gong.

King Ping was succeeded by his son, King Zhao.

King Ping of Chu House of Mi Died: 516 BC
Regnal titles
Preceded by Zi'ao	King of Chu; 528–516 BC	Succeeded by King Zhao of Chu
