= Timeline of the Warring States and the Qin dynasty =

Expansion of the Qin dynasty

This is a timeline of the Warring States period (481 BC – 403 BC) and the Qin state (9th century BC – 221 BC) and dynasty (221 BC – 206 BC).

== 9th century BC ==
Year	Event
897 BC	Horse breeder Feizi is given the fief of Qin in modern Zhangjiachuan Hui Autonomous County
858 BC	Feizi dies and is succeeded by the Marquis of Qin
848 BC	The Marquis of Qin dies and is succeeded by Gongbo
845 BC	Gongbo dies and is succeeded by Qin Zhong
822 BC	Qin Zhong is killed in battle by the Xirong and is succeeded by Duke Zhuang of Qin

== 8th century BC ==
Year	Event
778 BC	Duke Zhuang of Qin dies and is succeeded by Duke Xiang of Qin
770 BC	Duke Xiang of Qin sends an army to protect King Ping of Zhou
766 BC	Duke Xiang of Qin dies and is succeeded by Duke Wen of Qin
753 BC	Annalists are established in Qin
750 BC	Qin defeats the Xirong in battle and annexes the land they occupied
716 BC	Duke Wen of Qin dies and is succeeded by Duke Xian of Qin
704 BC	Duke Xian of Qin dies and is succeeded by Chuzi I

== 7th century BC ==
Year	Event
698 BC	Chuzi I is assassinated and succeeded by Duke Wu of Qin
688 BC	The county (縣 xiàn) is mentioned for the first time in Qin
678 BC	Duke Wu of Qin dies and is succeeded by Duke De of Qin
678 BC	Qin starts practicing human sacrifice at burials
677 BC	Qin moves its capital to Yong in modern Fengxiang
676 BC	Duke De of Qin dies and is succeeded by Duke Xuan of Qin
664 BC	Duke Xuan of Qin dies and is succeeded by Duke Cheng of Qin
660 BC	Duke Cheng of Qin dies and is succeeded by Duke Mu of Qin
650 BC	Earliest archaeological evidence of crossbows
645 BC	Qin annexes Jin territory west of the Yellow River
623 BC	Qin deals a major defeat to the Xirong and expands further west
621 BC	Duke Mu of Qin dies and is succeeded by Duke Kang of Qin
609 BC	Duke Kang of Qin dies and is succeeded by Duke Gong of Qin
604 BC	Duke Gong of Qin dies and is succeeded by Duke Huan of Qin

== 6th century BC ==
Year	Event
577 BC	Duke Huan of Qin dies and is succeeded by Duke Jing of Qin
544 BC	Sunzi is born
537 BC	Duke Jing of Qin dies and is succeeded by Duke Ai of Qin
513 BC	Penal laws are inscribed on iron tripod vessels in Qin
501 BC	Duke Ai of Qin dies and is succeeded by Duke Hui I of Qin

== 5th century BC ==
Year	Event
500 BC	Cast iron tools
496 BC	Sun Tzu dies
492 BC	Duke Hui I of Qin dies and is succeeded by Duke Dao of Qin
479 BC	Kongfuzi dies
477 BC	Duke Dao of Qin dies and is succeeded by Duke Ligong of Qin
473 BC	Battle of Li River: Goujian of Yue attacks Fuchai of Wu while their forces are out on an expedition against Lu and Qi, resulting in the annexation of Wu
470 BC	Mozi is born
462 BC	Qin seizes Wangcheng
447 BC	Chu (state) conquers Cai
443 BC	Duke Ligong of Qin dies and is succeeded by Duke Zao of Qin
440 BC	Wu Qi is born
430 BC	The Xirong attack Qin
429 BC	Duke Zao of Qin dies and is succeeded by Duke Huai of Qin
425 BC	Duke Huai of Qin kills himself and is succeeded by Duke Ling of Qin
418 BC	Qi annexes Xue
415 BC	Duke Ling of Qin dies and is succeeded by Duke Jian of Qin
412 BC	Qin goes to war with Wei
408 BC	First recorded grain tax in Qin

== 4th century BC ==
Year	Event
400 BC	Duke Jian of Qin dies and is succeeded by Duke Hui II of Qin
400 BC	The commandery (郡 jùn) is mentioned for the first time in Wei
400 BC	Iron plough
391 BC	Mozi dies
390 BC	Shang Yang is born
387 BC	Duke Hui II of Qin dies and is succeeded by Chuzi II
385 BC	Chuzi II is killed and succeeded by Duke Xian of Qin (424–362 BC)
385 BC	Wei conquers Qin territory west of the Yellow River
384 BC	Qin officially bans the practice of human sacrifice at burials
381 BC	Wu Qi dies
375 BC	Han conquers Zheng
372 BC	Mencius is born
369 BC	Chu conquers Zou
369 BC	Zhuang Zhou is born
362 BC	Duke Xian of Qin (424–362 BC) dies and is succeeded by Duke Xiao of Qin
350 BC	Qin moves its capital to Xianyang
350 BC	Qin creates 31 counties to be administered by centrally appointed magistrates
350 BC	Qin abolishes the fixed land tenure system
344 BC	Qin standardizes weights and measures
340 BC	Qin retakes territory lost to Wei
338 BC	Duke Xiao of Qin dies and is succeeded by King Huiwen of Qin
338 BC	Shang Yang is killed
336 BC	Qin issues its first currency
334 BC	Chu conquers Yue
326 BC	Qin starts celebrating the New Year
317 BC	Qin defeats the coalition army of Han, Zhao, and Wei
316 BC	Qin annexes Shu and Ba
315 BC	Qin captures 25 settlements from the Xirong
313 BC	Xun Kuang is born
312 BC	Qin defeats a Chu army
311 BC	King Huiwen of Qin dies and is succeeded by King Wu of Qin
309 BC	Qin creates the offices of chancellors of the right and left
307 BC	King Wu of Qin dies and is succeeded by King Zhaoxiang of Qin

== 3rd century BC ==
Year	Event
297 BC	Song conquers Teng
296 BC	Zhao conquers Zhongshan
289 BC	Mencius dies
286 BC	Qi conquers Song
286 BC	Zhuang Zhou dies
280 BC	Han Fei is born
278 BC	Qin sacks Ying, the capital of Chu
272 BC	Qin annexes Yiqu
266 BC	According to a noble in Wei, "Qin has the same customs as the Rong and Di [barbarians]. It has the heart of a tiger or a wolf... It knows nothing about traditional mores, proper relationships, and virtuous conduct."
262 BC	Battle of Changping: Qin deals a major defeat to Zhao
256 BC	Qin annexes Eastern Zhou
256 BC	Li Bing constructs the Dujiangyan
250 BC	King Zhaoxiang of Qin dies and is succeeded by King Xiaowen of Qin and then King Zhuangxiang of Qin
249 BC	Chu conquers Lu
247 BC	King Zhuangxiang of Qin dies and is succeeded by King Zheng of Qin
246 BC	The Zhengguo Canal is constructed
238 BC	Xun Kuang dies
233 BC	Han Fei is killed
230 BC	Qin annexes Han
228 BC	Qin annexes Zhao
227 BC	Jing Ke fails to assassinate King Zheng of Qin
225 BC	Qin annexes Wei
223 BC	Qin annexes Chu
222 BC	Qin annexes Yan
221 BC	Qin annexes Qi
221 BC	King Zheng of Qin becomes the First Emperor of Qin
221 BC	Meng Tian starts construction of the Great Wall of China
220 BC	Construction of imperial highways begins
219 BC	The emperor gets mad at a mountain god, so he orders the mountain to be denuded and painted red
219 BC	The Lingqu "magic transport" canal is constructed, linking the Changjiang to Dongting Lake
214 BC	Qin's campaign against the Xiongnu: Meng Tian defeats the Xiongnu and conquers the Ordos region
214 BC	Qin's campaign against the Yue tribes: Qin expands into modern Guangdong, Guangxi, and Fujian, adding four new commanderies to the empire
214 BC	Colonists are sent to Guilin, Xiang, and Nanhai
213 BC	Burning of books and burying of scholars
213 BC	Colonists are sent to modern Guangdong and northern Vietnam
212 BC	Construction of the Epang Palace begins
212 BC	Construction of the Qin Mausoleum begins
211 BC	An inauspicious comet is sighted, causing the emperor to kill everyone around the area where it fell
211 BC	Colonists are sent to Ordos
210 BC	Xu Fu returns from his voyage to find the elixir of life and blames his failure on sea monsters so the emperor goes fishing
210 BC	The First Emperor of Qin dies
210 BC	Zhao Gao and Li Si enthrone the Second Emperor of Qin; the brother Fusu kills himself and Meng Tian is imprisoned
209 BC	Qin annexes Wey
209 BC	Dazexiang uprising: Chen Sheng and Wu Guang rebel
208 BC	Dazexiang uprising: Chen Sheng and Wu Guang are assassinated but the rebellion continues under other leaders such as Liu Bang and Xiang Yu
208 BC	Li Si is killed
207 BC	Battle of Julu: Qin general Zhang Han surrenders to Xiang Yu
207 BC	The Second Emperor of Qin kills himself and Zhao Gao replaces him with Ziying, who stabs Zhao to death
207 BC	Ziying surrenders to Liu Bang; so ends the Qin dynasty

== Gallery ==
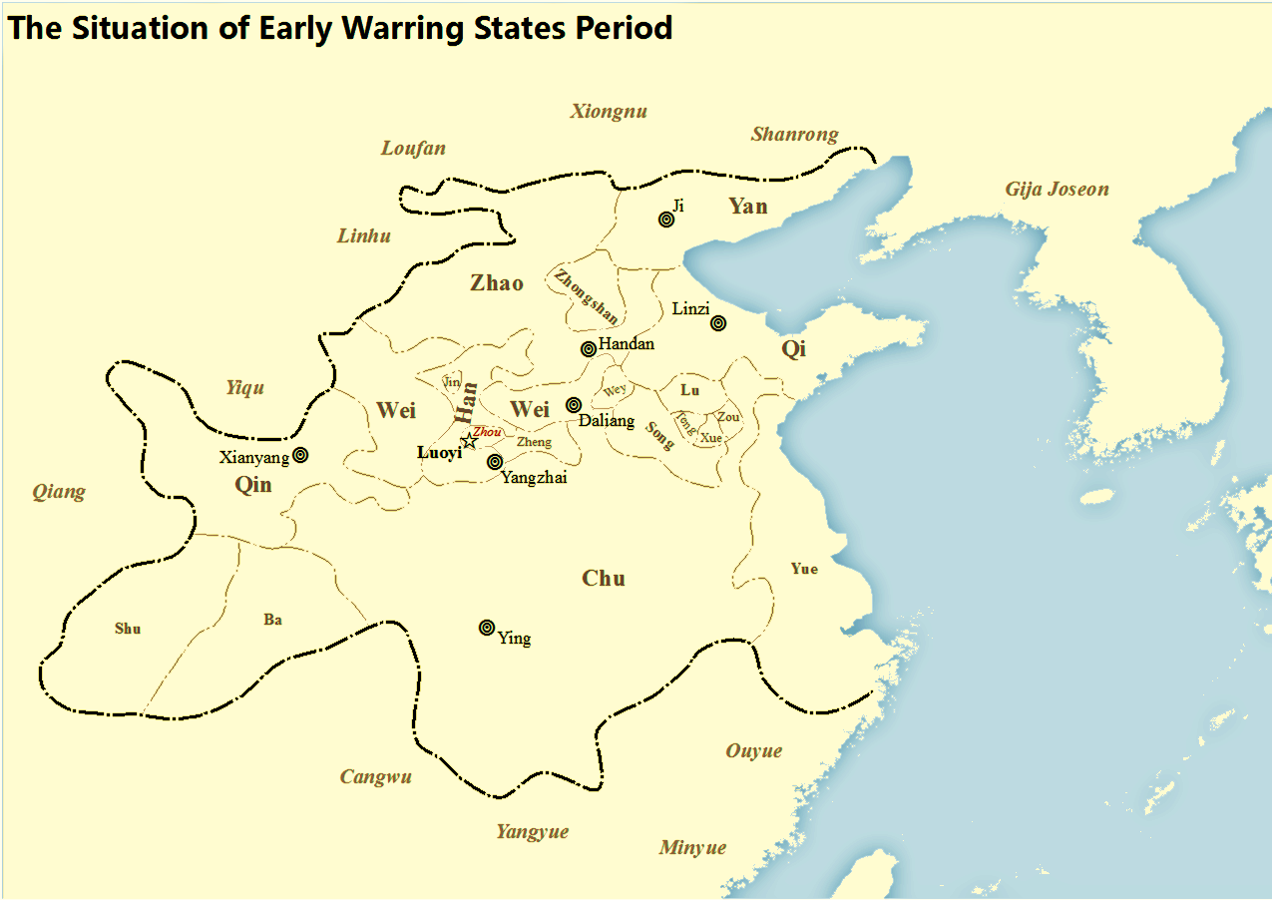
Early Warring States period

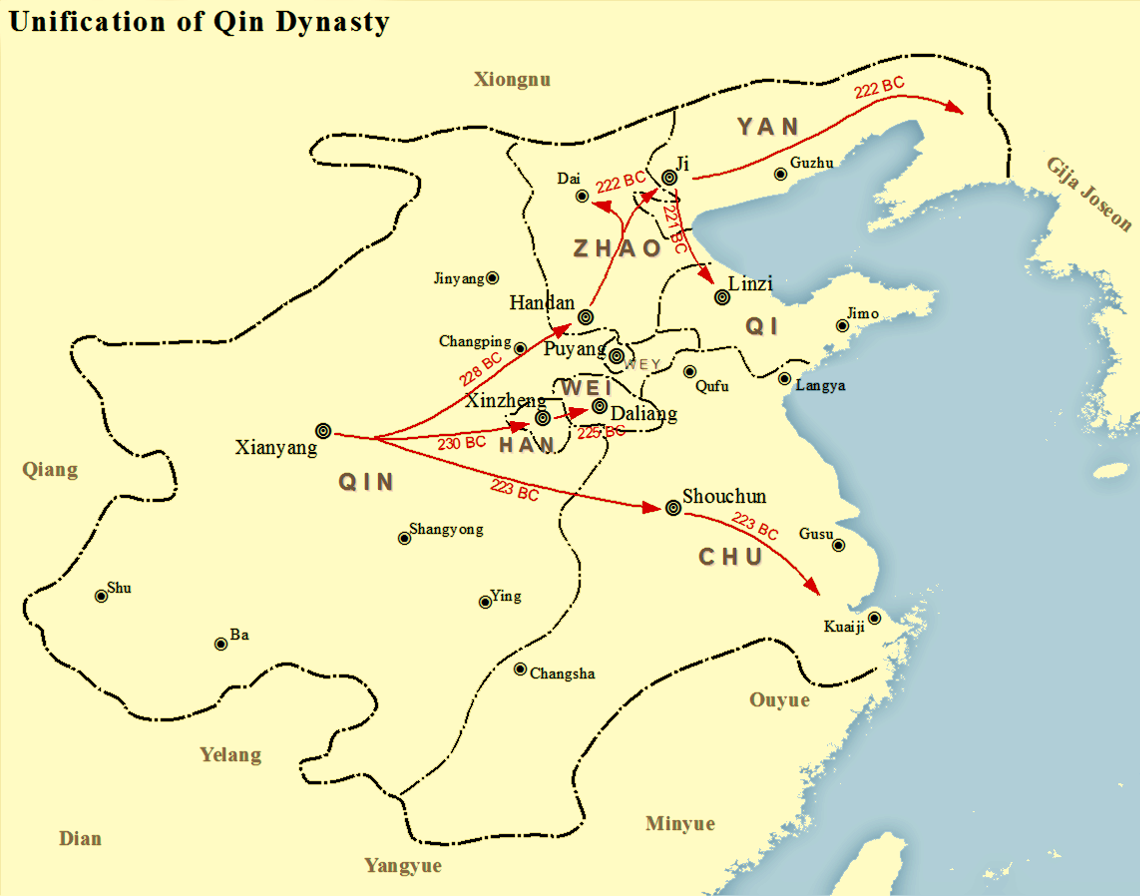
Qin campaigns against the Warring States

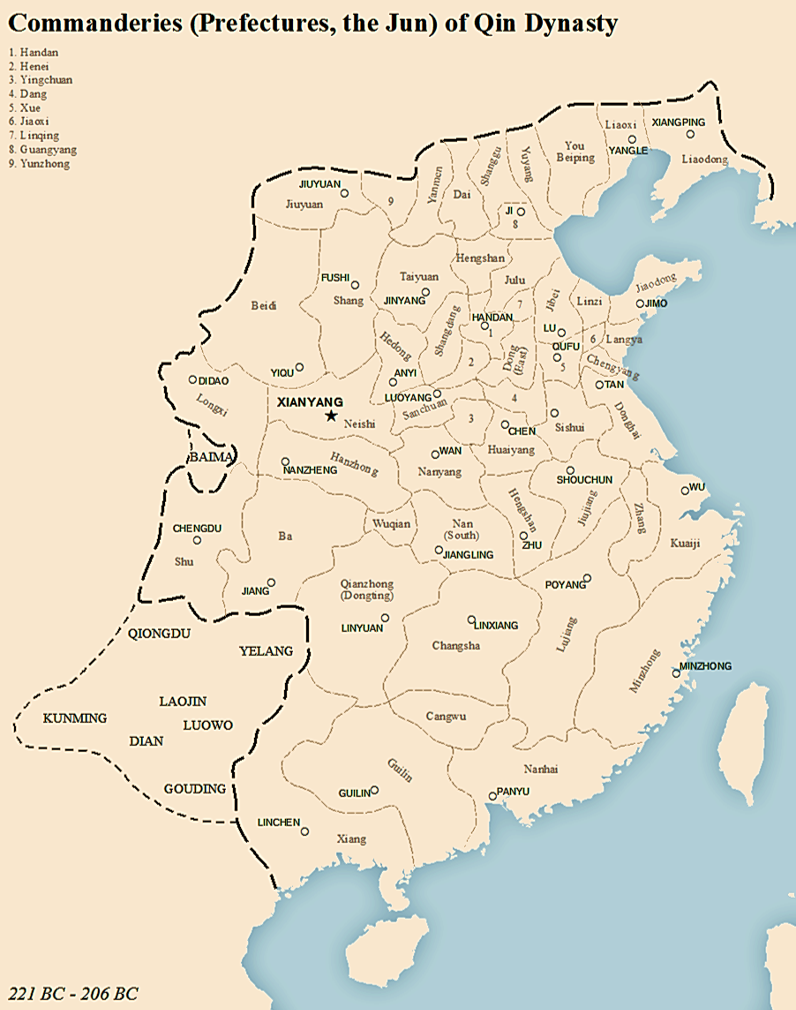
Qin dynasty

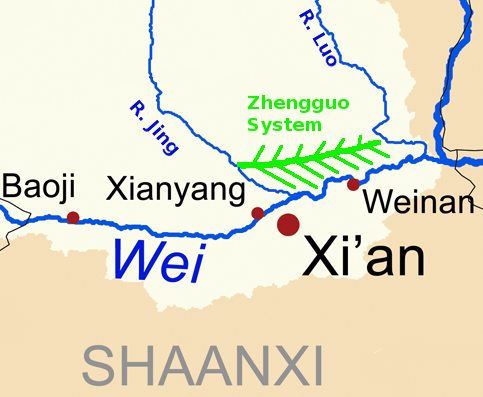
Zhengguo Canal

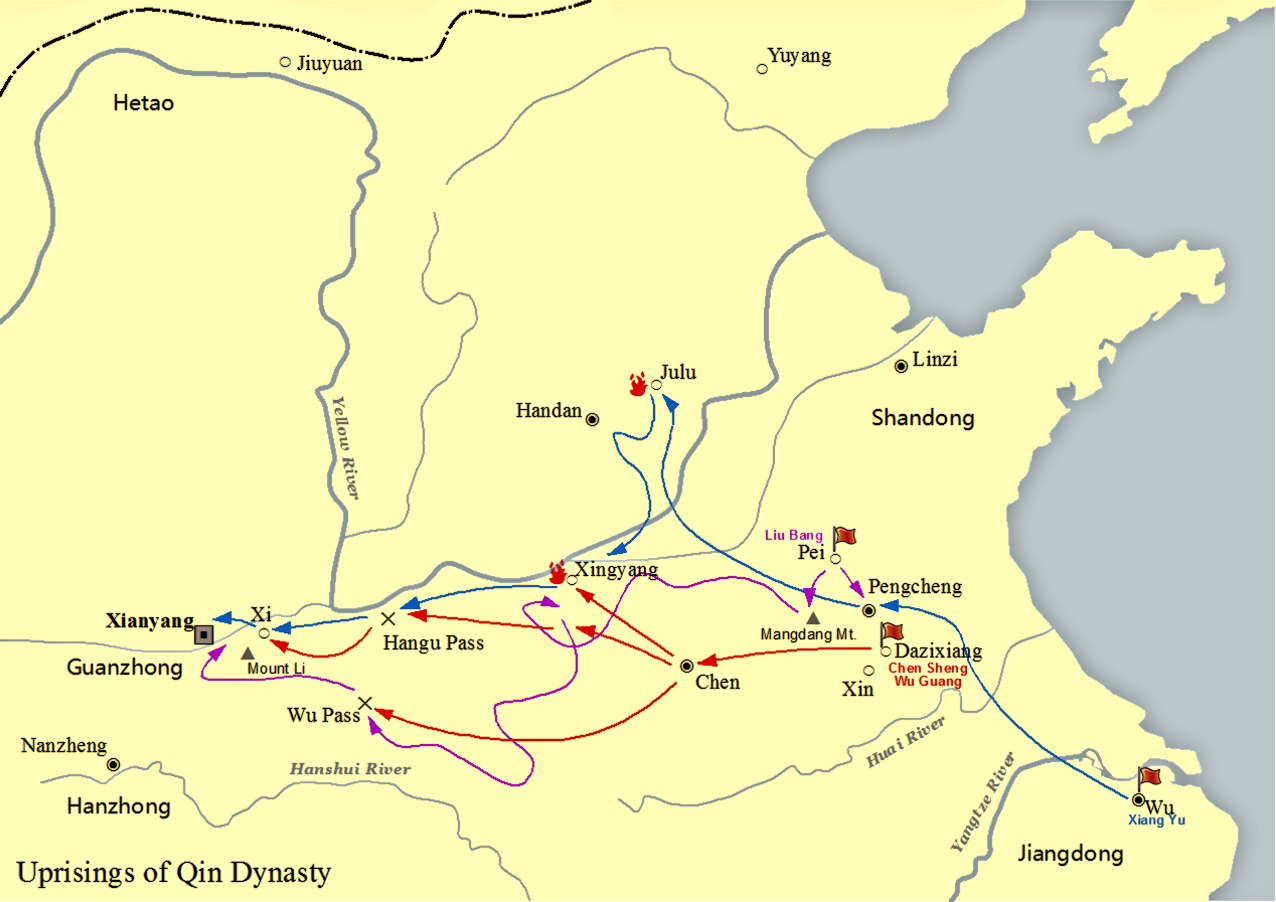
Uprisings of the Qin

== See also ==
- Timeline of the Chu–Han Contention

== Bibliography ==
- Ebrey, Patricia (2005), China: A Cultural, Social, and Political History, Wadsworth Publishing
- Li, Xiaobing, ed. China at War: An Encyclopedia. Santa Barbara: ABC-CLIO, 2012. online
- Loades, Mike (2018), The Crossbow, Osprey
- Peers, C.J. (2006), Soldiers of the Dragon: Chinese Armies 1500 BC - AD 1840, Osprey Publishing Ltd
- Peers, Chris (2013), Battles of Ancient China, Pen & Sword Military
- Twitchett, Denis (2008), The Cambridge History of China 1, Cambridge University Press
- Whiting, Marvin C. (2002), Imperial Chinese Military History, Writers Club Press
