= Li County, Gansu =

Li County 礼县
- County
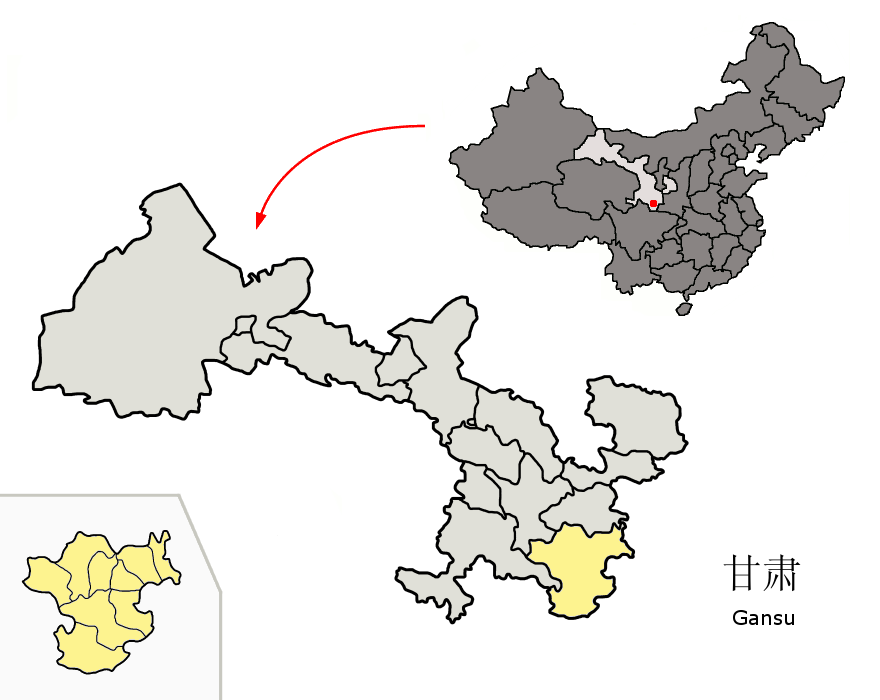
- Longnan Prefecture within Gansu
- Coordinates: 34°06′03″N 104°58′37″E
- Country: China
- Provinces: Gansu
- Prefecture-level city: Longnan
- County seat: Chengguan

Area
  - Total: 4,299.92 km^{2} (1,660.21 sq mi)

Population (2017)
  - Total: 536,817
  - Density: 124.843/km^{2} (323.343/sq mi)
- Time zone: China Standard
- Postal code: 742200
- Area code: 0939
- Licence plate prefixes: 甘K
- Website: lixian.gsjgbz.gov.cn

Li County or Lixian is an administrative division of the prefecture-level city of Longnan in southeastern Gansu, a northwestern province of China. The 2010 Chinese census found a population of 458,237, a decline of around 25,000 from the year 2000 but still placing it second in size within its prefecture.

The county seat is also known as Lixian, formerly romanized as Li Hsien. It is located at the confluence of the Western Han and Yanzi rivers, tributaries of the Jialing and Yangtze watersheds. Commanding a valley connecting the Yellow and Yangtze river systems, it was an important outpost of the Shang and Zhou dynasties and was the initial seat of the Ying family who later established the kingdom and empire of Qin.

== Geography ==
Lixian is bordered within Longnan by the counties of Xihe to the east, Wudu to the south, and Tanchang to the west. The municipalities of Dingxi and Tianshui lie to the northwest and northeast, respectively.

Sir Eric Teichman, the British diplomat and orientalist, described the territory in 1916 before its modern development:

...the path [from Tianshui] crosses the Tsin-ling Shan, and passes from the basin of the Huang Ho into that of the Yang-tse by an easy pass. The south-eastern corner of Kan-su, south of the Tsin-ling Shan range, differs greatly from the rest of the province. The bare loess hills of Central Kan-su with their waterless valleys give way to jungle-covered mountains with abundance of water, and coolie transport takes the place of camels, carts, and mules. The people are in close touch with Sechuan.

The Liba gold deposit (李坝金矿区) lies within the county limits.

== Climate ==
Climate data for Lixian, elevation 1,384 m (4,541 ft), (1991–2020 normals, extremes 1981–2010)
| Month | Jan | Feb | Mar | Apr | May | Jun | Jul | Aug | Sep | Oct | Nov | Dec | Year |
|---|---|---|---|---|---|---|---|---|---|---|---|---|---|
| Record high °C (°F) | 15.3 (59.5) | 20.2 (68.4) | 28.1 (82.6) | 31.0 (87.8) | 32.0 (89.6) | 34.2 (93.6) | 35.5 (95.9) | 34.1 (93.4) | 33.5 (92.3) | 26.3 (79.3) | 20.2 (68.4) | 14.8 (58.6) | 35.5 (95.9) |
| Mean daily maximum °C (°F) | 4.0 (39.2) | 7.3 (45.1) | 12.9 (55.2) | 19.0 (66.2) | 22.8 (73.0) | 26.1 (79.0) | 28.1 (82.6) | 27.1 (80.8) | 21.6 (70.9) | 16.1 (61.0) | 10.8 (51.4) | 5.5 (41.9) | 16.8 (62.2) |
| Daily mean °C (°F) | −2.0 (28.4) | 1.5 (34.7) | 6.6 (43.9) | 12.1 (53.8) | 16.0 (60.8) | 19.6 (67.3) | 22.0 (71.6) | 21.1 (70.0) | 16.5 (61.7) | 10.9 (51.6) | 4.8 (40.6) | −0.9 (30.4) | 10.7 (51.2) |
| Mean daily minimum °C (°F) | −6.3 (20.7) | −2.7 (27.1) | 1.6 (34.9) | 6.3 (43.3) | 10.2 (50.4) | 14.1 (57.4) | 17.0 (62.6) | 16.6 (61.9) | 12.8 (55.0) | 7.2 (45.0) | 0.7 (33.3) | −5.2 (22.6) | 6.0 (42.8) |
| Record low °C (°F) | −17.7 (0.1) | −15.3 (4.5) | −9.9 (14.2) | −4.1 (24.6) | −0.8 (30.6) | 5.2 (41.4) | 8.2 (46.8) | 7.6 (45.7) | 2.6 (36.7) | −5.3 (22.5) | −11.9 (10.6) | −16.7 (1.9) | −17.7 (0.1) |
| Average precipitation mm (inches) | 4.6 (0.18) | 6.5 (0.26) | 18.9 (0.74) | 36.0 (1.42) | 61.2 (2.41) | 65.1 (2.56) | 80.4 (3.17) | 78.6 (3.09) | 69.5 (2.74) | 48.3 (1.90) | 8.9 (0.35) | 2.4 (0.09) | 480.4 (18.91) |
| Average precipitation days (≥ 0.1 mm) | 5.4 | 5.5 | 8.2 | 9.2 | 11.6 | 11.9 | 11.7 | 11.6 | 13.2 | 12.1 | 5.6 | 2.9 | 108.9 |
| Average snowy days | 10.5 | 8.6 | 4.3 | 0.7 | 0 | 0 | 0 | 0 | 0 | 0.3 | 2.7 | 5.7 | 32.8 |
| Average relative humidity (%) | 65 | 64 | 63 | 62 | 65 | 69 | 71 | 73 | 78 | 79 | 75 | 68 | 69 |
| Mean monthly sunshine hours | 143.7 | 124.6 | 151.0 | 179.4 | 189.2 | 170.1 | 175.9 | 167.0 | 106.2 | 106.3 | 127.1 | 149.4 | 1,789.9 |
| Percentage possible sunshine | 45 | 40 | 40 | 46 | 44 | 40 | 40 | 41 | 29 | 31 | 41 | 49 | 41 |
Source: China Meteorological Administration

=== Agriculture ===
Huaniu apples are a speciality agricultural product of the region.

== History ==
Scientists from Lanzhou University have established that widespread agriculture began in Li County around 6,400 years ago as part of the Banpo phase of the Yangshao culture of the Wei River valley. The warm, humid climate of the mid-Holocene made the area productive for millet prior to the drier conditions which began about 2000 BC.

By the time of ancient China, Lixian was part of the territory of Xichui (lit. "the Western March"). During the Shang dynasty, Zhongjue (Note: Not Zhongyu.) and his son Feilian (蜚廉) controlled Xichui from the midst of the area's Rong tribes. Feilian's son Elai served King Zhou as his bodyguard and was killed when King Wu overthrew him and founded the Zhou dynasty.

Under the Zhou, however, Elai's family—the House of Ying—continued to control the area. His great-great-grandson was Daluo (大骆), who had two sons by different mothers in the early 9th century BC. Cheng, his son by the daughter of the Marquis of Shen, inherited Xichui and the other son, Feizi, initially went without and served as his brother's horse breeder. His reputation grew to the point that King Xiao charged him with breeding and providing the imperial cavalry. He proved so successful that, when the Marquis of Shen blocked his inheritance of Daluo's estate, King Xiao created him lord of nearby Qin (present-day Zhangjiachuan, Gansu). During the 842 BC Compatriots Rebellion, the Zhou king Li was overthrown at Hao and forced into a prolonged exile; (Note: Traditional accounts made this rebellion a spontaneous reäction of the oppressed people of Hao, but it seems more likely to have been the result of a royal defeat in a power struggle with aristocrats in the Wei valley.) the Rong took the occasion to attack and massacre Cheng's clan at Xichui. King Xuan named Feizi's great-grandson Qin Zhong commander over the Zhou expeditions against the Rong around 827 BC but the Rong killed him at Qin in 822. His son Zhuang and his four younger brothers successfully invaded the Rong lands with 7,000 Zhou soldiers and recovered both Qin and Xichui.

At some point during Spring and Autumn period, barley and wheat were introduced into the area in addition to its traditional millet. Created a duke over Xichui, Zhuang moved his family's capital to the site, establishing the city of Quanqiu. When Zhuang died in 778 BC, his eldest son Shifu (世父) refused to inherit official duties but chose instead to live a life on his chariot, fighting the Rong in revenge for his grandfather's death. His younger brother Xiang opted to marry his sister Mu Ying to King Feng of the Rong (豐王) and, the next year in 776 BC, he moved his capital from Quanqiu to Qian (汧, present-day Longxian in Shaanxi). Shifu led the defense of Quanqiu against the Rong who subsequently invaded. Overcome, he was captured and lived among the Rong for a year before being released. When the Quanrong overcame Hao in 771 and ended the Western period of the Zhou, Xiang was granted a promotion by King Ping and no longer suffered subordinate status.

Under the Qin and Han dynasties, it was part of Longxi Commandery, headquartered at Didao (present-day Taoyang in Lintao County). During the Northern Wei dynasty, it was part of Hanyang Commandery, headquartered at Hanyang (present-day Tianshui). Under the Western Wei, this was changed to Hanyang County. During the Tang, Lixian was known as Changdao (長道, 长道) and was part of Qinzhou (秦州), a province centered variously at Shanggui (present-day Tianshui) and Chengji (present-day Qin'an). The area was the home of the noted 10th-century memoirist Wang Renhui (王仁裕). Li County was separated from Tianshui's jurisdiction during the ninth year of Chenghua (AD 1473) during the Ming dynasty.

(in neighbouring Zhouqu County)

Li County's loess is prone to erosion and landslides. Amid the increasing collectivization of agriculture from 1964 to 1978, just seven flows damaged 22,000 hectares (85 sq mi) of farmland, destroyed 17,544 homes, and killed 1,142 people.

During the Cultural Revolution, the area received a bit of local notoriety for its flagging grain production. The "experiences of Li County" were used by regional officials to caution against implementation of Tachai-style collectivism in the mid-1970s. The collective farms in the area saw decreasing year-on-year yields of grain until, by 1976, all 29 of the county's communes were consuming more grain than they produced. This provoked official action, which denounced the complaints as "sabotage" and "poison", in the period between the fall of the Gang of Four and the rise of Deng Xiaoping's reform and opening up.

The area is also subject to earthquakes, with 25 recorded as having a magnitude of 5.0 or higher. The largest recorded was an 8.0-magnitude quake that struck on July 21, 1654; most recently, a 6.6-magnitude quake struck on July 22, 2013.

== Economy ==
Lixian is one of the counties included in the Targeted Poverty Alleviation campaign. In 2014, 26.1% of the population fell under the poverty line.

Lixian is known as the home of rhubarb in China. According to Qianlong era writings, rhubarb has been cultivated in the area for thousands of years. Other local produce includes apples, walnuts and peppers.

== Administrative divisions ==
Present-day, Li County includes 22 towns and 7 townships:

=== Towns ===
- Kuanchuan (宽川镇)
- Yongxing (永兴镇)
- Qishan (祁山镇)
- Honghe (红河镇)
- Yacheng (崖城镇)
- Taoping (洮坪镇)
- Baiguan (白关镇)
- Wangba (王坝镇)
- Tanping (滩坪镇)

Towns upgraded from Townships

- Baihe (白河镇)
- Gucheng (固城镇)
- Jiangkou (江口镇)
- Leiba (雷坝镇)
- Longlin (龙林镇)
- Luoba (罗坝镇)
- Qiaotou (桥头镇)
- Shiqiao (石桥镇)
- Yongping (永坪镇)
- Zhongba (中坝镇)

Towns established newly

- Chengguan (城关镇)
- Yanguan (盐官镇)
- Qiushan (湫山镇)

Former Towns

- Qiaochuan (乔川镇)
- Shangping (上坪镇)
- Taitang (太塘镇)
- Yangpo (阳坡镇)

=== Townships ===
- Mahe Township (马河乡)
- Shangping Township (上坪乡)
- Leiwang Township (雷王乡)
- Shajin Township (沙金乡)
- Caoping Township (草坪乡)
- Xiaoliang Township (肖良乡)
- Sanyu Township (三峪乡)

Former Townships

- Caoba (草坝乡)
- Jiaoshan (湫山乡)
- Minzu (民族乡)
- Quanshui (铨水乡)
- Yanhe (燕河乡)

== See also ==
- Dabaozishan Site and Graves
