= Longnan =

Longnan 陇南市
- Prefecture-level city
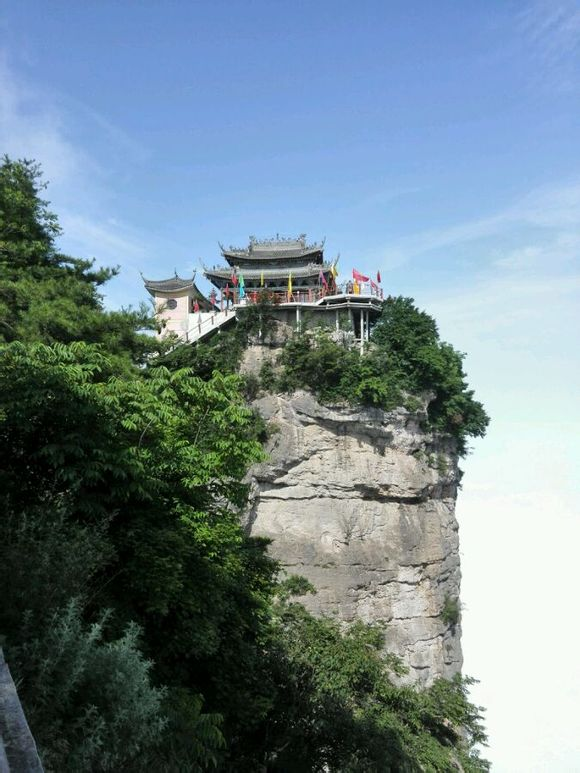

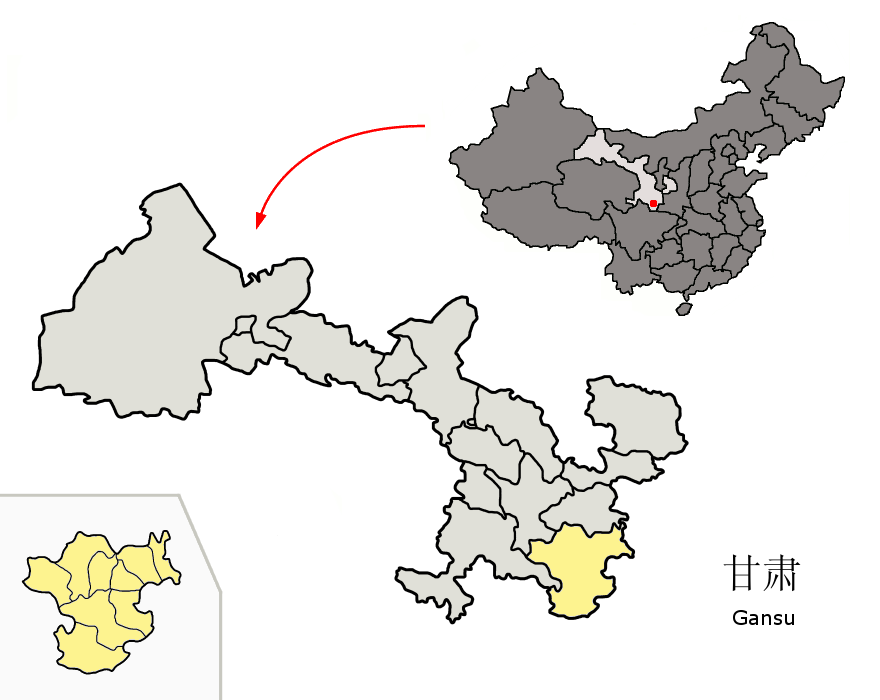
- Location of Longnan City jurisdiction in Gansu
- Coordinates (Longnan municipal government): 33°22′13″N 104°57′37″E
- Country: People's Republic of China
- Province: Gansu
- Municipal seat: Wudu District

Area
  - Prefecture-level city: 27,890 km^{2} (10,770 sq mi)
  - Urban: 4,649 km^{2} (1,795 sq mi)
  - Metro: 4,649 km^{2} (1,795 sq mi)

Population (2020 census)
  - Prefecture-level city: 2,407,272
  - Density: 86.31/km^{2} (223.5/sq mi)
  - Urban: 546,616
  - Urban density: 117.6/km^{2} (304.5/sq mi)
  - Metro: 546,616
  - Metro density: 117.6/km^{2} (304.5/sq mi)

GDP
  - Prefecture-level city: CN¥ 31.5 billion US$ 5.1 billion
  - Per capita: CN¥ 12,172; US$ 1,954
- Time zone: UTC+8 (China Standard)
- Postal code: 742500
- Area code: 0939
- ISO 3166 code: CN-GS-12
- Licence plate prefixes: 甘K
- Website: www.longnan.gov.cn

Longnan (simplified Chinese: 陇南; traditional Chinese: 隴南; pinyin: Lǒngnán; lit. 'south of Mount Long"') is a prefecture-level city in the southeast of Gansu province in China. It borders Sichuan on its south and Shaanxi on its east. As of the 2020 Chinese census, the population of the prefecture-level city was 2,407,272, of which 546,616 lived in the built-up (or metro) area made of Wudu District.

== Geography and climate ==
Longnan is in southern Gansu province bordering Shaanxi in the east and Sichuan in the south. It is called Gansu's southern gateway and gateway to the northwest. The major geographic features in Longnan are the Qinba Mountains in the east, the Loess Plateau in the north, and the Tibetan Plateau in the west. It is part of the Central Han basin in the east and the Sichuan basin in the south. Elevations range from 800 to 4,200 m (2,620 to 13,780 ft) above sea level. The three major rivers in Longnan are the Bailong, the Baishui, and the Jialing. Besides these major rivers there are more than 3800 streams and creeks. The annual flow from all of these rivers and streams is more than 28 billion m^{3}. The area of the prefecture is 27,000 square kilometres (10,000 sq mi).

Longnan has a temperate, monsoon-influenced semi-arid climate (Köppen BSk/BSh, depending on the source definition), with cool and very dry winters and hot, moderately humid summers. Due to the protected valley location and the southerly location in the province, the area is one of the warmest in Gansu, with annual temperatures ranging from 10 to 15 °C (50 to 59 °F). The annual precipitation is 400 to 1,000 mm (16 to 39 in), while there are between 160 and 280 frost free days. With monthly percent possible sunshine ranging from 34% in September and October to 53% in December, the city receives 1,850 sunlight hours annually. Two-thirds of the annual rainfall occurs from June to September. At Wudu, the monthly 24-hour average temperature ranges from 3.7 °C (38.7 °F) in January to 25.2 °C (77.4 °F) in July, the annual mean is 14.94 °C (58.9 °F), and the annual precipitation is 461 mm (18.1 in).

Climate data for Longnan (Wudu District), elevation 1,079 m (3,540 ft), (1991–2020 normals, extremes 1951–present)
Month	Jan	Feb	Mar	Apr	May	Jun	Jul	Aug	Sep	Oct	Nov	Dec	Year
Record high °C (°F)	18.0 (64.4)	24.4 (75.9)	31.6 (88.9)	34.9 (94.8)	37.4 (99.3)	39.9 (103.8)	39.0 (102.2)	39.0 (102.2)	37.0 (98.6)	30.5 (86.9)	25.2 (77.4)	17.3 (63.1)	39.9 (103.8)
Mean daily maximum °C (°F)	8.5 (47.3)	11.9 (53.4)	17.0 (62.6)	22.9 (73.2)	26.5 (79.7)	29.4 (84.9)	31.3 (88.3)	30.6 (87.1)	25.2 (77.4)	19.8 (67.6)	15.1 (59.2)	9.6 (49.3)	20.7 (69.2)
Daily mean °C (°F)	3.8 (38.8)	7.0 (44.6)	11.5 (52.7)	16.7 (62.1)	20.3 (68.5)	23.5 (74.3)	25.6 (78.1)	24.9 (76.8)	20.4 (68.7)	15.3 (59.5)	10.3 (50.5)	4.8 (40.6)	15.3 (59.6)
Mean daily minimum °C (°F)	0.2 (32.4)	3.3 (37.9)	7.4 (45.3)	12.0 (53.6)	15.5 (59.9)	19.0 (66.2)	21.2 (70.2)	20.8 (69.4)	17.0 (62.6)	12.1 (53.8)	6.7 (44.1)	1.1 (34.0)	11.4 (52.5)
Record low °C (°F)	−7.5 (18.5)	−7.8 (18.0)	−13.5 (7.7)	−8.6 (16.5)	5.1 (41.2)	10.1 (50.2)	14.7 (58.5)	12.3 (54.1)	8.4 (47.1)	0.9 (33.6)	−4.8 (23.4)	−8.6 (16.5)	−13.5 (7.7)
Average precipitation mm (inches)	1.6 (0.06)	2.9 (0.11)	14.0 (0.55)	34.7 (1.37)	67.3 (2.65)	65.8 (2.59)	84.5 (3.33)	78.8 (3.10)	70.4 (2.77)	42.6 (1.68)	7.2 (0.28)	0.6 (0.02)	470.4 (18.51)
Average precipitation days (≥ 0.1 mm)	1.9	2.6	6.9	9.0	13.1	11.4	11.1	11.3	12.8	12.1	4.2	0.9	97.3
Average snowy days	4.5	2.7	0.6	0.1	0	0	0	0	0	0	0.4	1.8	10.1
Average relative humidity (%)	49	49	49	50	54	58	60	62	67	67	58	51	56
Mean monthly sunshine hours	146.0	129.5	155.0	181.2	191.4	174.8	197.9	195.2	127.9	124.8	142.9	155.9	1,922.5
Percentage possible sunshine	46	41	41	46	44	41	46	48	35	36	46	51	43
Source: China Meteorological Administrationextremes

== History ==
Longnan was settled by humans at least 7000 years ago. Between 5000 and 6000 years ago, civilizations developed along the Xihan ("Western Han") and Bailong ("White Dragon") rivers. Anping in Wudu as well as Lixian both have ancient ruins. Longnan is very important in Chinese history: it was the home of Rong tribes that troubled the Shang and Zhou dynasties and is considered the homeland of the House of Ying, the family of the Qin dynasty that united China at the end of the Warring States period. Wudu County was even founded as part of the Qin Empire. It is still common to find Qin artifacts—including pottery, bronzes, and coins—in the area.

During the Sixteen Kingdoms period, the region was ruled by the Qiang kingdoms of Later Qin and Tanchang, the latter has its capital in present-day Tanchang. Tanchang is conquered by Emperor Wu of Northern Zhou in 564. The region then went under control of Sui, Tang and Song dynasties, then subsequently conquered by the Tibetans, Tanguts, Jurchens and Mongols before finally administered by Ming dynasty court. Under imperial Chinese rule, the area was administered as Jie Prefecture (t 階州, s 阶州, Jiēzhōu).

== Administration ==
Longnan has 1 urban districts, 8 counties, 242 towns, and 3243 villages with a total population of 2567718.

Map
#	Name	Simplified Chinese	Hanyu Pinyin	Population (2010 census)	Area (km^{2})	Density (/km^{2})
City proper
1	Wudu District	武都区	Wǔdū Qū	555,004	4,642	119.56
Rural
2	Cheng County	成县	Chéng Xiàn	242,343	1,678	144.42
3	Wen County	文县	Wén Xiàn	218,796	5,002	43.74
4	Tanchang County	宕昌县	Tànchāng Xiàn	274,313	3,315	82.75
5	Kang County	康县	Kāng Xiàn	180,061	2,968	60.67
6	Xihe County	西和县	Xīhé Xiàn	393,272	1,862	211.21
7	Li County	礼县	Lǐ Xiàn	458,237	4,264	107.47
8	Hui County	徽县	Huī Xiàn	200,294	2,699	74.21
9	Liangdang County	两当县	Liǎngdāng Xiàn	45,398	1,408	32.24

== Economy ==
In 2004, Longnan's GDP was 6,338,000,000 RMB, a 12% growth over the previous year.

Important agricultural products include cereals and grains, Chinese medicinal herbs, vegetable oil, fruits, nuts, berries, and vegetables. Coal, copper, lead, zinc, petroleum, and gold are all major mineral resources for Longnan. Cement and other building materials are also produced here.

== Transportation ==
- Longnan Chengxian Airport
- China National Highway 212
- G75 Lanzhou–Haikou Expressway
- Chongqing–Lanzhou railway
- Baoji–Chengdu railway (stations only available in Hui County and Liangdang County)
- Tianshui–Longnan railway (under construction)

== Notable people ==
- Cai Wu, Chinese politician and former Minister of Culture of the People's Republic of China.
- Cao Dong, Chinese footballer (Chongqing Dangdai Lifan, Chinese Super League)
- Chen Hongjun, Major of People's Liberation Army who was killed in combat during the 2020–2022 China–India skirmishes in the Sino-Indian border
- Li Xi, Chinese politician
- Yang Fulin, Chinese military officer and politician
- Zhang Zhixi, Chinese actress (Lady Zhen in The Advisor's Alliance)

== Flora and fauna ==
Longnan has more than 1300 species of trees and shrubs, 1300 plants and herbs used for Chinese medicine, 100 wild fruits and berries, and 300 species of animals, many species of which are protected.
