= Feizi =

Founder of Qin state

Feizi 非子

Ruler of Qin
- Reign: 900–858 BC
- Successor: Marquis of Qin
- Died: 858 BC
- Issue: Marquis of Qin
Names
- Ying Feizi (嬴非子)
- House: Ying
- Dynasty: Qin
- Father: Daluo (大骆)

Feizi
- Chinese: 非子
Transcriptions
Standard Mandarin
- Hanyu Pinyin: Fēizǐ
- Wade–Giles: Fei-tzu
- IPA: [féɪ.tsì]

Qin Ying
- Chinese: 秦嬴
Transcriptions
Standard Mandarin
- Hanyu Pinyin: Qín Yíng
- Wade–Giles: Ch'in Ying
- IPA: [tɕʰǐn ǐŋ]

Feizi (Note: Also romanized as Fei-tse and Feitsa.) (Chinese: 非子; died 858 BC), also known as Qin Ying and Ying Feizi, was the founder of the state of Qin. He was the direct male 5th-generation descendant of Elai Ge.

== Family ==
=== Mythical origin of Qin ===
According to the founding myths of Qin recorded in the Records of the Grand Historian by Han dynasty historian Sima Qian, Feizi descended from the mythical Yellow Emperor and his grandson and successor Zhuanxu. Zhuanxu's granddaughter Nüxiu (女脩) gave birth to Daye (大業) after swallowing the egg of a swallow. Daye's son Boyi (伯益) was awarded the ancestral name Ying (嬴) by the mythical Chinese ruler Shun.

=== Ancestry ===
During the Shang dynasty, Boyi's descendant Zhongjue was in charge of Xichui (西垂, also called Quanqiu, in present-day Li County, Gansu) in the midst of the Rong tribes. Zhongjue's son Feilian (蜚廉) and grandson Elai served Di Xin, and Elai was killed when King Wu of Zhou overthrew the Shang and founded the Zhou dynasty. Feizi's father Daluo (大骆) was the fourth-generation direct male descendant of Elai. However, Daluo's legal heir was not Feizi, but his other son Cheng, because Cheng was born to Daluo's main wife, the daughter of the Marquess of Shen.

Zaofu was the 3rd cousin twice removed of Feizi, when King Mu of Zhou granted Zaofu a city called Zhao (趙), Zaofu and his descendants adopted Zhao as their surname. due to Feizi's favor from Zaofu, he also adopted Zhao as his surname.

== Founding of Qin ==
Feizi lived in Xichui and was a skilled horse breeder. King Xiao of Zhou learned of his reputation and put him in charge of breeding and training horses for the Zhou army. To reward his contributions, King Xiao wanted to make Feizi his father's legal heir instead of his half-brother Cheng. However, the Marquess of Shen, Cheng's grandfather, objected and said that the Rong people would revolt if the king deposed Cheng. The king changed his mind and awarded Feizi the small fief of Qin instead (in present-day Zhangjiachuan County, Gansu), separate from his father's fief of Xichui, and gave Feizi the title Qin Ying, a combination of his fief and ancestral name.

This was the beginning of the State of Qin that would, over six centuries later, conquer all of the other Zhou states and unify China under the rule of Qin Shi Huang, the First Emperor of the Qin dynasty. At this time Qin was only a minor state classified as an "attached state" (附庸, fuyong), and Feizi did not receive any noble rank. Qin would not become a major vassal state until five generations later, when King Ping of Zhou granted Duke Xiang of Qin a formal noble rank and recognition as a feudal lord for protecting the king during the invasion of the Quanrong nomads which drove the Zhou out of their western capital.

== After death ==
Feizi died in 858 BC and was succeeded by his son, known as the Marquis of Qin. In 842 BC the Rong people rebelled, destroying the clan of Feizi's half-brother at Xichui. Twenty years later, Feizi's great-grandson Qin Zhong was also killed by the Rong in 822 BC. However, Qin Zhong's son and successor Duke Zhuang of Qin defeated the Rong and annexed Xichui, thus reuniting the territories of the two branches of the House of Ying.

== Notes ==
Feizi House of Ying Died: 858 BC
Regnal titles
New creation	Ruler of Qin; 860–858 BC	Succeeded by Marquis of Qin
