= Jie Prefecture =

Jie Prefecture or Jiezhou may refer to:

- Jie Prefecture (階州) in present-day Gansu, a prefecture of imperial China (9th–20th centuries)
- Jie Prefecture (介州) in present-day Shanxi, a prefecture of imperial China (7th century)
