= Jie Zhou =

Jie Zhou may refer to:

- Jiezhou, a prefecture between the 9th and 20th centuries in modern Gansu, China
- Zhou Jie (born 1970), Chinese actor surnamed Zhou
