= Cao Dong (disambiguation) =

No Party for Cao Dong is a Taiwanese indie rock band, Cao Dong may also refer to:

- Caodong school, Chinese Chan Buddhist branch
- Cao Dong (footballer) (born 1997), Chinese footballer
- Cao Dong (renju player) (born 1982), Chinese renju player
