= Duke Huai =

Duke Huai may refer to these ancient Chinese rulers:

- Duke Huai of Jin (died 637 BC)
- Duke Huai of Qin (died 425 BC)
