= Duke Wen of Qin =

Duke Wen of Qin 秦文公

Ruler of Qin
- Reign: 765–716 BC
- Predecessor: Duke Xiang of Qin
- Successor: Duke Xian of Qin
- Died: 716 BC
Posthumous name
- Duke Wen (文公)
- House: Ying
- Dynasty: Qin
- Father: Duke Xiang of Qin

Duke Wen of Qin (Chinese: 秦文公; pinyin: Qín Wén Gōng, died 716 BC), personal name unknown, was a duke of the state of Qin during the Eastern Zhou dynasty.

== Reign ==
Duke Wen succeeded his father Duke Xiang of Qin, who died in 766 BC while campaigning against the Quanrong in Qishan. He moved the Qin capital back to Quanqiu (犬丘, also called Xichui, in present-day Li County, Gansu) from Qian (汧, in present-day Long County, Shaanxi), but in 762 BC moved the capital again to the confluence of the Qian and Wei rivers.

In 753 BC Duke Wen established the office of historiographer to record the official history of Qin. In 750 BC he defeated the Rong tribes that were occupying the former Zhou land. He returned the territory east of Qishan to Zhou, and kept the rest for Qin as King Ping of Zhou had promised Duke Wen's father Duke Xiang that Qin could keep the land west of Qishan if they could expel the Rong people. By repelling the Rong, the territory of Qin was greatly expanded.

== Succession ==
Duke Wen reigned for 50 years from 765 until 716 BC. His son, the crown prince, died before him in 718 BC and was given the posthumous title Duke Jing (秦竫公). Duke Wen died in 716 BC and was succeeded by his grandson, Duke Xian of Qin.

Duke Wen of Qin House of Ying Died: 716 BC
Regnal titles
Preceded by Duke Xiang of Qin	Duke of Qin; 765–716 BC	Succeeded by Duke Xian of Qin
