= Jin Shouhao =

Chinese politician

- 金寿浩

Governor of Yanbian Korean Autonomous Prefecture
- In office June 2017 – November 2021
- Party Secretary: Tian Jinchen; Jiang Zhiying
- Preceded by: Li Jinghao
- Succeeded by: Hong Qing

Personal details
- Born: June 1962 (age 64) Hunchun, Jilin, China
- Party: Chinese Communist Party (1994–2025; expelled)
- Education: Central Party School; Jilin Provincial Party School

Chinese name
- Simplified Chinese: 金寿浩
Transcriptions

Jin Shouhao (Chinese: 金寿浩) or Kim Suho (Korean: 김수호) is an ethnic Korean Chinese politician. He was previously the governor of Yanbian Korean Autonomous Prefecture beginning in 2017, and voluntarily resigned in 2021, being succeeded by Hong Qing.

== Early life ==
Jin was born in June 1962 in Hunchun in Yanbian Korean Autonomous Prefecture, China.

== Political career ==
Jin began his career in March 1979, working at the Dahuanggou Forest Farm under the Hunchun Forestry Bureau, a position he held until July 1982. From July 1982 to December 1990, he served in the Chunhua Forestry Public Security Police Station of the Hunchun Forestry Bureau, where he worked successively as a police officer, deputy director, and director. He then became Deputy Head of the Forest Protection Division of the Hunchun Forestry Bureau from December 1990 to July 1992. Between July 1992 and February 1996, Jin served as Deputy Secretary of the Discipline Inspection Commission of the Hunchun Forestry Bureau. During this time, he pursued in-service undergraduate studies in economic management at the Central Party School from August 1995 to December 1997. In February 1996, he became Secretary of the Discipline Inspection Commission of the Hunchun Forestry Bureau at the deputy county level, a position he held until June 1998.

From June 1998 to October 1999, Jin served as Deputy Secretary of the Party Committee of the Baihe Forestry Bureau. During this period, he attended economic management training at Tsinghua University from August to December 1998. He then served as Deputy Director and Deputy Party Secretary of the Dunhua Economic Development Zone from October 1999 to February 2001, including a temporary assignment as Assistant Director of the Longquan Development Zone in Chengdu, Sichuan, from June to December 2000. Jin became Deputy Secretary of the Dunhua Municipal Party Committee in February 2001, serving until December 2002. From December 2002 to June 2003, he was Director and Party Secretary of the Yanbian Prefecture Tourism Bureau. He then became Party Secretary of Helong city, serving from June 2003 to April 2010. During this time, he pursued in-service graduate studies in economic management at the Jilin Provincial Party School from August 2006 to July 2009.

In April 2010, Jin was appointed a member of the Standing Committee of the Yanbian Prefecture Party Committee and Minister of the United Front Work Department, serving until January 2012. From January 2012 to March 2013, he simultaneously served as a Standing Committee member and Minister of both the Propaganda Department and the United Front Work Department. From March 2013 to November 2016, he served as a Standing Committee member and Secretary of the Yanbian Prefecture Discipline Inspection Commission. He briefly served from November to December 2016 as a Standing Committee member of the Yanbian Prefecture Party Committee and Party Secretary of the Standing Committee of the Prefectural People's Congress. From December 2016 to January 2017, he continued as Party Secretary of the Standing Committee and from January to June 2017, he served as Director and Party Secretary of the Standing Committee of the Prefectural People's Congress.

In June 2017, Jin became Deputy Party Secretary of the Yanbian Prefecture Party Committee, Party Secretary of the Standing Committee of the Prefectural People's Congress, and concurrently Vice Governor and Acting Governor of the prefectural government. From July to August 2017, he continued as Deputy Party Secretary, Vice Governor and Acting Governor. In 2018, Jin was elected as a delegate for Jilin Province to the 13th National People's Congress. From August 2017, he served as Deputy Party Secretary of the Yanbian Prefecture Party Committee and Governor of the Yanbian Prefecture Government, until his resignation in November 2021.

== Downfall ==
On 23 August 2024, Jin came under disciplinary review and supervisory investigation for suspected serious violations of discipline and law. On 7 April 2025, the Jilin Provincial Commission for Discipline Inspection and the Jilin Provincial Supervisory Commission decided to expel him from the Chinese Communist Party and remove him from public office, confiscate his illicit gains and transfer his case to judicial authorities. In the same month, the bribery case in which Jin was suspected was placed under the jurisdiction of the Songyuan Municipal People's Procuratorate by designation of the Jilin Provincial People's Procuratorate. The Songyuan Municipal People's Procuratorate then filed a public prosecution with the Songyuan Intermediate People's Court in accordance with the law.

== Awards and honors ==
On 25 February 2021, he was awarded the title of "National Advanced Individual in Poverty Alleviation" at the National Poverty Alleviation Summary and Commendation Conference held in Beijing.
