= Li Jinghao =

Chinese politician

- 李景浩

Head of the Jilin Provincial United Front Work Department
- Incumbent
- Assumed office May 2017
- Preceded by: Jiang Zhiying

Mayor of Yanbian Korean Autonomous Prefecture
- In office April 2013 – May 2017
- Preceded by: Li Longxi
- Succeeded by: Jin Shouhao

Communist Party Secretary of Longjing
- In office August 2001 – June 2003

Personal details
- Born: July 1961 (age 65) Antu County, Jilin, China
- Party: Chinese Communist Party
- Education: Changchun University of Technology; Nanyang Technological University

Li Jinghao (Chinese: 李景浩; pinyin: Lǐ Jǐnghào, Korean: 리경호; Hanja: 李景浩; born July 1961) is a Chinese politician of Korean ethnicity. He is the head of the Jilin Provincial United Front Work Department and a member of the Chinese Communist Party Provincial Standing Committee of Jilin. He entered the workforce in August 1983 and joined the Chinese Communist Party in March 1989.

== Biography ==
Li was born in Antu County, Jilin, China in July 1961. In September 1979, he entered Jilin Engineering Institute (now Changchun University of Technology), where he graduated in August 1983. He also obtained his Bachelor's degree in Management Economics from Nanyang Technological University in May 2004.

After university, he was assigned to Yanbian Korean Autonomous Prefecture as an official. In November 2000 he became the Deputy Communist Party Secretary of Longjing, rising to Communist Party Secretary the next year. He served as Deputy Mayor of Yanbian Korean Autonomous Prefecture in February 2007, and six years later promoted to the Mayor position. In May 2017 he was appointed the head of the Jilin Provincial United Front Work Department and a member of the Standing Committee of the CPC Jilin Provincial Committee.

He was a member of the 12th National People's Congress. He is an alternate member of the 19th Central Committee of the Chinese Communist Party.

Party political offices
Preceded by Li Longxi	Mayor of Yanbian Korean Autonomous Prefecture; 2013–2017	Succeeded by Jin Shouhao
Government offices
Preceded by Jiang Zhiying	Head of the Jilin Provincial United Front Work Department; 2017	Incumbent
