= Family tree of Chinese monarchs (Warring States period) =

This is a family tree of Chinese monarchs during the Warring States period.

Family trees of Chinese monarchs
- (ancient)
- (Spring and Autumn period)
- (Warring States period)
- (early)
- (middle)
- (late)

== Warring States period ==
In 771 BC, a coalition of feudal lords and the Western Rong tribes overthrew King You and drove the Zhou out of the Wei valley. During the following Spring and Autumn and Warring States periods, the major states pursued independent policies and eventually declared full independence claiming the title 王 borne by Zhou rulers. All claimed descent from the Yellow Emperor through cadet lines of the royal houses above, although the historicity of such claims is usually doubted.

=== Qin ===
The kings of Qin claimed descent from the Lady Xiu, "the granddaughter" of "a remote descendant" of the Emperor Zhuanxu, the grandson of the Yellow Emperor. Similarly, in the next generation, Lady Hua was said to be descended from Shaodian, the legendary figure who is sometimes the father and sometimes the foster father of the Yellow and Flame Emperors. Although Nüfang (lit. 'Lady Fang') is counted as Elai's son, some scholars have claimed the figure was Elai's daughter and, along with the numerous important women in the early pedigree, indicates that early Qin was matriarchal. (Note: E.g., Lao Kan in his commentary on the Records of the Grand Historian, although note Nienhauser's disagreement with that assessment.) The surname Ying (lit. 'Abundance') was said to have been bestowed by Shun upon Dafei (the husbandman Yi). If it was ever held by any of his descendants, it had fallen out of use by the time of Feizi, who was granted the name anew by King Xiao of the Zhou.

Qin state

Nüxiu 女脩; Lady Xiu	A bird (Note: Sima Qian calls it a 玄鸟, where 玄 can mean "black" or "mysterious". Lao Kan identified the bird as a swallow.)
Daye 大業; Ye the Great	Nühua 女華; Lady Hua
Dafei 大費; Fei the Great fl. 22nd C. BC	Yaoxingzi yunü 姚姓之玉女 jade lady of the Yao
Dalian 大廉; Lian the Great	Ruomu 若木
unknown	unknown
unknown	unknown
unknown	unknown
Mengxi 孟袭; Xi the Elder	Zhongyan 中衍; Yan the Younger	Feichang 費昌
unknown
unknown
Xuxuan 胥轩
Zhongjue (Note: Not Zhongyu.) 中潏; Jue the Younger
Feilian 蜚廉
Elai 恶來	Jisheng 季勝; Sheng the Youngest
Nüfang 女防	Hengfu 衡父
Panggao 旁臯	a marquis of Shen 申侯	Zaofu 造父 fl. 950 BC
unknown	Taiji 太几; Ji the Great	unknown
^{(1)}Feizi 非子 r. –858 BC	Cheng 成
^{(2)}Qinhou 秦侯; Marquis of Qin r. 857–848 BC	4 generations skipped
^{(3)}Gongbo 公伯 r. 848–845 BC
^{(4)}Qinzhong 秦仲; Qin the Younger r. 844–822 BC	Shu Dai 费昌
^{(5)}Duke Zhuang 秦莊公 r. 821–778 BC	4 other sons	House of Zhao
Shifu 世父	^{(6)}Duke Xiang 秦襄公 r. 777–766 BC	another son	Mou Ying 繆嬴 m. 777 BC	King of Feng 豐王 a Rong leader
^{(7)}Duke Wen 秦文公 r. 765–716 BC
^{(-)}Duke Jing 秦竫公 d. 718 BC
Lu Ji 鲁姬	^{(8)}Duke Xian 秦憲公 (Note: Recorded as "Duke Ning of Qin" (秦寧公) in Sima Qian, but inscriptions on excavated bronzeware from the period has shown this to have been a mistranscription of the original "Xian".) r. 715–704 BC	Wang Ji 王姬
^{(10)}Duke Wu 秦武公 r. 697–678 BC	^{(11)}Duke De 秦德公 r. 677–676 BC	^{(9)}Duke Chu I 秦出公 [Chuzi I] r. 703–698 BC	Duke Xian of Jin r. 676–651 BC
Ying Bai^{(12)}嬴白	Duke Xuan 秦宣公 r. 675–664 BC	^{(13)}Duke Cheng 秦成公 r. 663–660 BC	^{(14)}Duke Mu 秦穆公; Ying Renhao r. 659–621 BC	Mu Ji 穆姬
9 sons	7 sons
^{(15)}Duke Kang 秦康公; Ying Ying r. 620–609 BC	38 other sons	Nongyu	Xiao Shi	King Gong of Chu r. 590–560 BC	Qin Ying	Ying Hong
^{(16)}Duke Gong 秦共公 r. 608–604 BC	Duke Huai of Jin r. 637 BC	Huai Ying 懷嬴	Duke Wen of Jin r. 636–628 BC	Wen Ying	Jianbi
^{(17)}Duke Huan 秦桓公 r. 603–577 BC
^{(18)}Duke Jing 秦景公 r. 576–537 BC
^{(19)}Duke Ai 秦哀公 r. 536–501 BC
^{(-)}Duke Yi 秦夷公	Bo Ying m. 523 BC	King Ping of Chu
^{(20)}Duke Hui I 秦惠公 r. 500–492 BC
^{(21)}Duke Dao 秦悼公 r. 491–477 BC
^{(22)}Duke Ligong 秦厲共公 r. 476–443 BC
^{(23)}Duke Zao 秦躁公 r. 442–429 BC	^{(24)}Duke Huai 秦懷公 r. 428–425BC
Zhaozi 昭子	^{(26)}Duke Jian 秦簡公 r. 414–400 BC
^{(25)}Duke Ling 秦靈公 r. 424–415 BC	^{(27)}Duke Hui II 秦惠公 r. 399–387 BC
^{(29)}Duke Xian 秦獻公; Ying Lian r. 384–362 BC	^{(28)}Duke Chu II 秦出公 (Chuzi II) r. 386–385 BC
^{(30)}Duke Xiao 秦孝公; Ying Quliang r. 361–338 BC
^{(31)}King Huiwen 秦惠文王; Ying Si r. 338–311 BC	Queen Xuan	King of Yiqu 義渠王
^{(32)}King Wu 秦武王; Ying Dang r. 310–307 BC	Lady Yeyang	^{(33)}King; Zhaoxiang 秦昭襄王; Ying Ze r. 306–251 BC	Lady Tang
Crown Prince; Dao 悼太子	unknown	^{(34)}King Xiaowen; Ying Zhu 秦孝文王 r. 250 BC	Lady Xia
Prince Xi	~20 other sons
Lady Zhao m. 261 BC	^{(35)}King; Zhuangxiang 秦莊襄王; Ying Yiren r. 249–247 BC	unknown
^{(36)}Shi Huangdi 秦始皇; Ying Zheng	Lord Chang'an 長安君; Ying Chengjiao
See: family tree of the Qin dynasty

=== The Three Jins ===
==== Han ====
Han state

Mu of Jin 晉穆侯; Marquis of Jin; 812–785 BC
Wen of Jin 晉文侯; Marquis of Jin; 780–746 BC	Huan Shu of Quwo 曲沃桓叔; 745–731 BC
Zhao of Jin 晉昭侯; Marquis of Jin; 745–739 BC	Hán Wàn 韓萬; Wuzi of Han 韓武子; Ruler of Han	Zhuang Bo of Quwo 曲沃莊伯; 731–716 BCE
Qiubo of Han 韓賕伯; Ruler of Han
Hán Jiǎn 韓簡; Dingbo 韓定伯; Ruler of Han
Hán Yú 韓輿; Ziyu 子輿; Ruler of Han
Hán Jué 韓厥; Xianzi of Han 韓獻子; Ruler of Han
Hán Qǐ 韓起; Xuanzi of Han 韓宣子; Ruler of Han
Hán Xū 韓須; Zhenzi of Han 韓貞子; Ruler of Han
Hán Bùxìn 韓不信; Jianzi of Han 韓簡子; Ruler of Han
Hán Gēng 韓庚; Zhuangzi 韓莊子; Ruler of Han
Hán Hǔ 韓虎; Kangzi of Han 韓康子; Ruler of Han
Hán Qǐzhāng 韓啓章; Wuzi of Han 韓武子; Ruler of Han; 424–409 BC
Hán Qián 韓虔; Jing of Han 韓景侯; Marquess of Han; 408–400BC
Hán Qǔ 韓取; Lie (Wu) of Han; Marquess of Han; 399–387 BC
Wen of Han; Marquess of Han; 386–377 BC
Ai of Han 韓哀侯; Marquess of Han; 376–374 BC
Hán Ruòshān 韓若山; Gong of Han 韓共侯; Marquess of Han; 374–363 BC
Hán Wǔ 韓武; Xi of Han 韓釐侯; Marquess of Han; 362 BC–333 BC
Xuanhui of Han 韓宣惠王; King of Han; 332–312 BC
Hán Cāng 韓倉; Xiang of Han 韓襄王; King of Han; 311–296 BC
Hán Jiù 韓咎; Xi of Han 韓釐王; King of Han; 295–273 BC	Jǐ shī 蟣蝨
Huanhui of Han 韓桓惠王; King of Han; 272–239 BC	Xin of Han; King of Han; 205–196 BC
Hán Ān 韓安; An of Han 韓王安; King of Han ?–238–230–226 BC

==== Wei ====
Wei state family tree

Bi Wan 毕万
Mang Ji 芒季
Wei Chou 魏犨; Viscount Wu of Wei 魏武子
Wei Ke 魏颗 令狐氏	Wèi Qí 魏锜 吕氏 ?–575	Viscount Dao of Wei 魏悼子
Wèi Jié 魏颉 令狐文子 ?–570	Wei Xiang 魏相 吕宣子 ?–622	Wei Jiang 魏絳; Viscount Zhao of Wei 魏昭子
Wei Shu 魏舒; Viscount Xian of Wei 魏獻子; 565–509 BC
Wei Qu 魏取; Viscount Jian of Wei 魏简子	Wèi Wù 魏戊
Wei Chi 魏侈; Viscount Xiang of Wei 魏襄子
Wei Ju 魏驹; Viscount Huan of Wei 魏桓子 ?–446 BC
^{(1)}Wei Si 魏斯; Wen of Wei 魏文侯; Marquess of Wei ?–424–396 BC	Wei Cheng 魏成
^{(2)}Wei Ji 魏擊; Wu of Wei 魏武侯; Marquess of Wei ?–396–370 BC	少子挚
^{(3)}Wei Ying 魏罃; Hui of Wei 魏惠王; King of Wei; 400–370–319 BC	魏緩
Crown Prince Shen 太子申	^{(4)}Wei He 魏赫; Xiang of Wei 魏襄王; King of Wei ?–319–296 BC	Prince Gao 公子高
Crown Prince Zheng 太子政	^{(5)}Wei Chi 魏遫; Zhao of Wei 魏昭王; King of Wei ?–296–277 BC
^{(6)}Wei Yu 魏于; Anxi of Wei 魏安釐王; King of Wei ?–277–243 BC	Wei Wuji 魏無忌; Lord Xinling 信陵君 ?–243 BC
^{(7)}Wei Zeng 魏增; Jingmin of Wei 魏景湣王; King of Wei ?–243–228 BC
^{(8)}Wei Jia 魏假; Jia of Wei 魏王假; King of Wei ?–228–225 BC

==== Zhao ====
Zhao state

^{(1)}Shu Dai 叔帶
□
□
^{(4)}Duke Ming 公明
^{(5)}耿氏; Zhao Su 趙夙	Zhao Shuai^{(6)}Viscount Cheng 趙成子 ?–622 BC
Gòng Mèng 共孟	Zhao Dun^{(7)}Viscount Xuan of Zhao 趙宣子 ?–601 BC	Zhao Tong 趙同 原氏 ?–583 BC	^{(8)}Zhao Kuo 趙括 屏氏 ?–583 BC	Zhao Yingqi 趙嬰齊 楼氏
Zhao Chuan 趙穿 邯郸氏	赵旃叔父	Zhao Shuo; Viscount Zhuang of Zhao 赵庄子 ?–597 BC
Zhào Zhān; Xiōng 赵旃兄	Zhao Dan 趙旃	Zhao Wu^{(9)}Viscount Wen of Zhao 趙文子 ?–541
Zhao Sheng 趙勝	Zhào Huò 赵获	Ying Cheng^{(10)}Viscount Jing of Zhao 趙景子 ?–518 BC
Zhao Wu 趙午 ?–497	□	Zhao Yang^{(11)}Viscount Jian of Zhao 趙簡子 ?–476 BC
Zhào Jì 赵稷	□	Zhào Bólŭ 趙伯魯	趙毋卹^{(12)}Viscount Xiāng of Zhao 趙襄子 ?–425 BC
Zhào Cháo 赵朝	代成君; Zhào Zhōu 赵周	趙嘉^{(13)}Viscount Huan of Zhao 趙桓子 ?–424
趙浣^{(14)}Xian of Zhao 趙獻侯; Marquess of Zhao ?–409 BC
Zhào Jí^{(15)}Lie of Zhao 趙烈侯; Marquess of Zhao ?–409–400 BC	^{(16)}Duke Wu of Zhào 趙武公 ?–400–387 BC
Zhào Zhāng^{(17)}Jing of Zhao 趙敬侯; Marquess of Zhao c. 410–387–375 BC	Ducal Son; Zhao 公子朝
Zhào Zhòng^{(18)}Cheng 趙成侯; Marquess of Zhao ?–375–350 BC
趙語^{(19)}Su of Zhao 趙肅侯; Marquess of Zhao ?–350–326 BC	Lord Anping 安平君
Zhao Yong^{(20)}Wuling 趙武靈王; King of Zhao; 340–326– 298–295 BC
安阳君; Ying Zhang 嬴章; Lord of Anying 安陽君 ?–295	Zhao He^{(21)}Huiwen 趙惠文王; King of Zhao; 310–298–266 BC	Zhao Bao; Lord Yangwen 陽文君	Zhao Sheng 趙勝; Lord Pingyuan 平原君 ?–251 BC
Zhao Dan^{(22)}Xiaocheng 趙孝成王; King of Zhao ?–266–245 BC	Prince; Chang'an 長安君	Lord Luling 廬陵君
Zhao Yan^{(23)}Daoxiang 趙悼襄王; King of Zhao ?–245–236 BC
Zhao Jia^{(25)}Prince Jia of Dai 代王嘉; 250–228– 222–? BC	Zhao Qian^{(24)}Youmiu 趙幽繆王; King of Zhao; 245–236– 228–? BC

=== Qi ===
==== House of Jiang ====
Qi state - House of Jiang

^{(1)}Jiang Ziya; Duke Tai of Qi 齐太公
^{(2)}Lü Ji 呂伋; Ding of Qi 齐丁公; Duke of Qi c. 10th cent. BC
^{(3)} Lü De 呂得; Yǐ of Qi 齐乙公; Duke of Qi; 10th cent. BC	Jìzi 季子 崔氏
^{(4)}Lü Cimu 呂慈母; Gui of Qi 齐癸公; Duke of Qi; 10th cent. BC
^{(5)}Lü Buchen 呂不辰; Ai of Qi 齐哀公; Duke of Qi ?–?–878 BC	^{(6)}Lü Jing 呂靜; Hu of Qi 齐胡公; Duke of Qi ?–878–860 BC	^{(7)}Lü Shan 呂山; Xian of Qi 齐献公; Duke of Qi ?–860–851 BC
^{(8)}Lü Shou 呂壽; Wu of Qi 齐武公; Duke of Qi ?–851–825 BC
^{(9)}Lü Wuji 呂無忌; Li of Qi 齐厉公; Duke of Qi ?–825–816 BC
^{(10)}Lü Chi 呂赤; Wen of Qi 齐文公; Duke of Qi ?–816–804 BC
^{(11)}Lü Yue 呂說; Cheng of Qi 齐成公; Duke of Qi ?–804–795 BC	Gāo Shì 高氏 公子高
^{(12)}Lü Gou 呂購; Zhuang I of Qi 齐庄公; Duke of Qi ?–795–731 BC
Dé Chén 得臣	^{(13)}Lü Lufu 呂祿甫; Xi of Qi 齐僖公; Duke of Qi ?–731–698 BC	Yi Zhongnian 夷仲年 ?–699	Prince Liào 公子廖; Xí Shì 隰氏
^{(14)}Lü Zhu'er 呂諸兒; Xiang of Qi 齐襄公; Xiang of Qi ?–698–686 BC	Prince Jiu 公子纠 ?–685	^{(16)}Lü Xiǎobái 呂小白; Huan of Qi 齐桓公; Duke of Qi ?–685–643 BC	Wen Jiang 文姜 d. 673 BC	Huan of Lu 魯桓公; Duke of Lu; 711–694 BC	^{(15)}Lü Wuzhi 呂無知; 729–686–685 BC
^{(17)}Lü Wúkuī 呂無虧; Duke of Qi BC ?–643–642 BC	^{(18)}Lü Zhao 呂昭; Xiao of Qi 齐孝公; Duke of Qi ?–642–633 BC	^{(19)}Lü Pan 呂潘; Zhao of Qi 齐昭公; Duke of Qi ?–633–613 BC	^{(21)}Lü Shangren 呂商人; Yì of Qi 齐懿公; Duke of Qi ?–613–609 BC	^{(22)}Lü Yuan 呂元; Hui of Qi 齐惠公; Duke of Qi ?–609–599 BC	Prince Yong 公子雍	Zhuang of Lu; Duke of Lu; 693–662 BC
^{(20)}Lü She 呂舍 ?–609 BC	^{(23)}Lü Wuye 呂無野; Qing of Qi 齐顷公; Duke of Qi ?–599–582 BC	Luán Shì栾氏; Prince Jiān 公子坚	Gāo Shì 高氏; Prince Qí 公子祁
Prince Jiǎo 公子角	^{(24)}Lü Huan 呂環; Ling of Qi 齐灵公; Duke of Qi ?–582–554 BC	Zǐ Chéng	Zi Gòng	Zi Xiàshèng	□
^{(25)}Lü Guāng 呂光; Zhuang II of Qi 齐庄公; Duke of Qi ?–554–548 BC	Prince Ya 公子牙	^{(26)}Lü Chujiu 呂杵臼; Jing of Qi 齐景公; Duke of Qi ?–548–490 BC	Prince Qīng 公孙青	Prince Jié 公孙捷
Prince Jia 公子嘉	Yàn Jīzi 燕姬子	^{(28)}Lü Yangsheng; Dao of Qi 齐悼公; Duke of Qi ?–489–485 BC	^{(27)} Lü Tu 呂荼; An Ruzi 安孺子; Duke of Qi ?–490–489 BC	Prince Qian 公子黔	Prince Chu 公子鉏	Prince Ju 公子驹
^{(29)}Lü Ren 呂壬; Jian of Qi 齐简公; Duke of Qi ?–485–481 BC	^{(30)}Lü Ao 呂驁; Ping of Qi 齐平公; Duke of Qi ?–481–456 BC
^{(31)}Lü Ji 呂積; Xuan of Qi 齐宣公; Duke of Qi ?–456–405 BC
^{(32)}Lü Dai 呂貸; Kang of Qi 齐康公; Duke of Qi ?–405–386–379 BC

==== House of Tian ====
Qi state – House of Tian

^{(1)}Chen Wan 陳完; Tian Jingzhong 田敬仲
^{(2)}Tian Zhi 田穉; Tian Mengyi 田孟夷
^{(3)}Tian Min 田湣; Tian Mengzhuang 田孟莊
^{(4)}Tian Xuwu 田須無; Tian Wenzi 田文子
^{(5)}Tian Wuyu 田無宇; Tian Huanzi 田桓子
^{(6)}Tian Kai 田開; Tian Wuzi 田武子 ?–516 BC	^{(7)}Tian Qi 田乞; Tian Xizi 田僖子	Chén Zhāozi 陈昭子	孙书 孙氏	Zi Mén 子亹
陈瓘	^{(8)}Tian Heng 田恆; Tian Chengzi 田成子	Zi Zhì 子士	Viscount Xuān 宣子	廪邱子	Sūn Píng 孙凭	Viscount Xiàn 子献
^{(9)}Tian Pan 田盤; Tian Xiangzi 田襄子	Viscount Jiǎn 简子	Viscount Mù 穆子	Viscount Máng 芒子	Viscount Huì 惠子	Sūnwǔ 孙武	Zhū Yùyāng 诸御鞅
^{(10)}Tian Bai 田白; Tian Zhuangzi 田莊子 ?–411 BC
^{(11)}Tian Daozi 田悼子; 410–405 BC	^{(12)}Tian He 田和; Tai of Tian Qi 齐太公; Duke of Tian Qi ?–386–384 BC
^{(13)}Tián Yǎn 田剡; Marquis of Tian ?–383–375 BC	^{(14)}Tian Wu 田午; Huan of Tian Qi 田齊桓公; Duke of Tian Qi; 400–374–357 BC
Tian Xi 田喜	^{(15)}Tian Yinqi 田因齊; Wei of Qi 齐威王; King of Qi ?–356–320 BC
^{(16)}Tian Bijiang 田辟疆; Xuan of Qi 齐宣王; King of Qi ?–319–301 BC	Jiāo Shī 郊师	Tian Ying 田嬰
^{(17)}Tian Di 田地; Min of Qi 齐湣王; King of Qi c. 323 –300–284 BC	Tian Wen 田文; Lord Mengchang 孟尝君
^{(18)}Tian Fazhang; Xiang of Qi 齐襄王; King of Qi ?–283–265 BC
^{(19)}Tian Jian 田建; Jian of Qi 齐王建; King of Qi ?–264–221 BC	^{(20)}Tian Jia 田假; King of Qi ?–208–205 BC
□
Tian An 田安

=== Chu ===
Chu state

Jilian 季連; Ruler of Chu
Yingbo 𦀚伯; Ruler of Chu	Yuanzhong 遠仲
?
Yuxiong 鬻熊; Ruler of Chu; 11th cen. BC
Xiong Li 熊麗; Ruler of Chu; 11th cen. BC
Xiong Kuang 熊狂; Ruler of Chu; 11th cen. BC
Xiong Yi 熊繹; Viscount of Chu; 1042–1006 BC
Xiong Ai 熊艾; Viscount of Chu; 1006–981 BC
Xiong Dan 熊䵣; Viscount of Chu; 981–970 BC
Xiong Sheng 熊勝; Viscount of Chu; 970–946 BC	Xiong Yang 熊楊; Viscount of Chu
Xiong Qu 熊渠; Viscount of Chu; 887–877 BC
Xiong Kang 熊康; Viscount of Chu
Xiong Zhi 熊摯; Viscount of Chu; 877–876 BC	Xiong Yan 熊延; Viscount of Chu; 876–848 BC
Xiong Yong 熊勇; Viscount of Chu; 847–838 BC	Xiong Yan 熊嚴; Viscount of Chu; 837–828 BC
Xiong Shuang 熊霜; Viscount of Chu; 827–822 BC	Xiong Xue 熊雪	Xiong Xun 熊徇; Viscount of Chu; 821–800 BC	Xiong Kan 熊堪
Xiong E 熊咢; Viscount of Chu; 799–791 BC
Xiong Yi 熊儀; Ruo'ao 若敖; Viscount of Chu; 790–764 BC
Dou Bobi 鬬伯比	Xiong Kan 熊坎; Xiao'ao 霄敖; Viscount of Chu; 763–758 BC
Xiong Xuan 熊眴; Fenmao 蚡冒; Viscount of Chu; 757–741 BC	Wu of Chu 楚武王; King of Chu; 740–690 BC
Qu Xia 屈瑕	Wen of Chu 楚文王; King of Chu; 689–677 BC	Ziyuan 子元 d. 664 BC
Xiong Jian 熊艱; Du'ao 堵敖; King of Chu; 676–672 BC	Xiong Yun 熊惲; Cheng of Chu 楚成王; King of Chu; 671–626 BC	Zheng Mao 鄭瞀
Xiong Shangchen; Mu of Chu 楚穆王; King of Chu; 625–614 BC	Prince Zhi 王子职
Xiong Lü; Zhuang of Chu 楚莊王; King of Chu; 613–591 BC
Xiong Shen 熊審; Gong of Chu 楚共王; King of Chu; 600–590–560 BC
Xiong Zhao 熊招; Kang of Chu 楚康王; King of Chu; 559–545 BC	Xiong Wei 熊圍; Ling of Chu 楚靈王; King of Chu; 540–529 BC	Xiong Bi 熊比; Zi'ao 訾敖; King of Chu; 529 BC	Zixi	Xiong Qiji 熊弃疾; Ping of Chu 楚平王; King of Chu; 528–516 BC
Jia'ao 郟敖; King of Chu; 544–541 BC	Crown Prince; Lu 太子禄 d. 529 BC	Prince Pidi 公子罢敌 d. 529 BC	Shen 王子申; Zixi 子西	Xiong Zhen 熊珍; King Zhao of Chu; King of Chu; 515–489 BC	Jie 王子结; Ziqi 子期	Qi 王子啟; Zilü 子闾
Xiong Pingxia 平夏 d. 541	Xiong Mu 公子慕 d. 541	Xiong Zhang 熊章; Hui of Chu 楚惠王; King of Chu; 488–432 BC
Xiong Zhong 熊中; Jian of Chu; King of Chu; 431–408 BC
Xiong Dang 熊當; Sheng of Chu 楚聲王; King of Chu; 407–402 BC
Xiong Yi 熊疑; Dao of Chu; King of Chu; 401–381 BC
Xiong Zang 熊臧; Su of Chu 楚肅王; King of Chu; 380–370 BC	Xiong Liangfu 熊良夫; Xuan of Chu 楚宣王; King of Chu; 369–340 BC
Xiong Shang 熊商; Wei of Chu; King of Chu; 339–329 BC
Xiong Huai 熊槐; Huai of Chu 楚懷王; King of Chu; 328–299 BC
Xiong Heng 熊橫; Qingxiang of Chu; King of Chu; 298–263 BC	Huang Xie 黃歇; Lord Chunshen 春申君 d. 238 BC	E Jun Qi 鄂君啟; Lord of the state of E	?
Xiong Yuan 熊元; Kaolie of Chu 楚考烈王; King of Chu; 262–238 BC	Xiong Xin; Yi of Chu; 208–206 BC
Xiong Han 熊悍; You of Chu 楚幽王; King of Chu; 237–228 BC	Xiong You 熊猶; Ai of Chu 楚哀王; King of Chu; 228 BC	Xiong Fuchu 熊負芻; King of Chu; 227–223 BC	Lord Changping 昌平君; King of Chu; 224–223 BC

=== Yue ===
Rulers of Yue family tree

^{(1)} Marquis Wuyu of Yue 越侯無餘
^{(2)} Marquis Wuren of Yue 越侯無壬
^{(3)} Marquis Wushen of Yue 越侯無瞫
^{(4)} Marquis Futan of Yue 越侯夫譚 (r. 565─538 BC)
^{(5)} Marquis Yunchang of Yue 越侯允常 (d. 497 BC)
^{(6)} King Goujian of Yue 越王句踐 (496─465 BC)
^{(7)} King Luying of Yue 越王鹿郢 (465─459 BC)
^{(8)} King Bushou of Yue 越王不壽 (459─449 BC)
^{(9)} King Weng of Yue 越王翁 (449─412 BC)
^{(10)} King Yi of Yue 越王翳 (412─376 BC)
^{(11)} King Zhihou of Yue 越王之侯 (376─375 BC)
^{(12)} King Chuwuyu of Yue 越王初無余 (375─365 BC)
^{(13)} King Wuzhuan of Yue 越王無顓 (365─357 BC)
^{(14)} King Wuqiang of Yue 越王無彊 (357─333 BC)

=== Yan ===
Yan state

Duke of Shao
1Ke 燕侯克	召伯父辛 召国	□
癸	2Zhi 燕侯旨	Xian 燕侯宪	He 伯龢
3Wu 燕侯舞
6~9？Sheng 燕伯聖	4Xian 燕侯宪 一说即伯宪
5He 燕侯和 一说即伯和
10Marquess Hui 燕惠侯 ?-865-827BC
11Marquess Li 燕-{釐}-侯 ?-827-791BC
12Marquess Qing 燕頃侯 ?-791-767BC
13Marquess Ai 燕哀侯 ?-767-765BC
14Marquess Zheng 燕鄭侯 ?-765-729BC
15Marquess Mu 燕穆侯 ?-729-711BC
16Marquess Xuan 燕宣侯 ?-711-698BC
17Marquess Huan 燕桓侯 ?-698-691BC
18Marquess Zhuang 燕莊公 ?-691-658BC
19Marquess Xiang 燕襄公 ?-658-618BC
20Duke Huan 燕桓公 ?-618-602BC
21Duke Xuan 燕宣公 ?-602-587BC
22Duke Zhao 燕昭公 ?-587-574BC
23Duke Wu 燕武公 ?-574-555BC
24Duke Wen 燕文公 ?-555-549BC
25Duke Yi 燕懿公 ?-549-545BC
26Duke Hui 燕惠公 ?-545-536BC
27Duke Dao 燕悼公 ?-535-529BC
28Duke Gong 燕共公 ?-529-524BC
29Duke Ping 燕平公 ?-524-505BC
30Duke Jian 燕簡公 ?-505-493BC
31Duke Xiao 燕孝公 ?-493-455BC
32Duke Cheng 燕成公 ?-455-439BC
33Duke Min 燕閔公 ?-439-415BC
34Duke Jian 燕簡公 ?-415-370BC
35Duke Huan 燕桓公 ?-370-362BC
36Duke Wen 燕文公
37King Yi 燕易王 ?-333-321BC
38Kuai 燕王噲 ?-321-316-314	Zi Zhi 子之 ?-316-314BC
39King Zhao 燕昭王 ?-312-279BC
40King Hui 燕惠王 ?-279-272BC
41King Wucheng 燕武成王 ?-272-258BC
42King Xiao 燕孝王 ?-258-255BC
43Xi 燕王喜 ?-255-222BC
Crown Prince Dan 太子丹 ?-226
