= Marquis of Qin =

Marquis of Qin 秦侯

Ruler of Qin
- Reign: 857–848 BC
- Predecessor: Feizi
- Successor: Gongbo
- Died: 848 BC
- Issue: Gongbo
Names
- Surname: Ying; Given name: Unknown
- House: Ying
- Dynasty: Qin
- Father: Feizi

The Marquis of Qin (Chinese: 秦侯; pinyin: Qín Hóu, died 848 BC) was the second ruler of the state of Qin, founded when his father Feizi was granted a small fief at Qin by King Xiao of Zhou. The Marquis of Qin succeeded his father, who died in 858 BC, and ruled for 10 years. He died in 848 BC and was succeeded by his son Gongbo. His ancestral name was Ying (Chinese: 嬴), but his given name is not known.

Although Qin would eventually develop into a major power that would conquer all other Chinese states and unite China proper in 221 BC to start the Qin dynasty, at the time of the Marquis of Qin it was still a minor state of the Western Zhou dynasty classified as an "attached state" (附庸, fuyong). Qin rulers did not receive any noble rank until four generations later during the reign of Duke Xiang of Qin, so "the Marquis of Qin" was presumably an honorific title that his descendants used to refer to him.

Marquis of Qin House of Ying Died: 848 BC
Regnal titles
Preceded by Feizi	Ruler of Qin; 857–848 BC	Succeeded by Gongbo
