= Yanzi River =

River in Gansu, China

The Yanzi River or Creek (Chinese: 燕子河, Yànzǐhé, literally "Swallow Creek") is a river in Gansu, China. It is a tributary of the Xihan, itself a part of the Yangtze watershed.
