= Baihe =

Baihe may refer to:

== Mainland China ==
=== Counties ===
- Baihe County (白河县, lit. "White Creek"), Ankang, Shaanxi

=== Towns ===
- Baihe, Guangdong (百合镇), town in Kaiping
- Baihe Town, Gansu (白河镇), town in Li County
- Baihe, Guangxi (百合镇), town in Heng County
- Baihe, Hebei (白合镇), town in Tang County
- Baihe, Mengjin County (白鹤镇), town in Henan
- Baihe, Song County (白河镇), town in Henan
- Baihe, Hubei (白鹤镇), town in Fang County
- Baihe, Shanghai (白鹤镇), town in Qingpu District
- Baihe, Sichuan (白合镇), town in Dongxing District, Neijiang
- Baihe, Zhejiang (白鹤镇), town in Tiantai County

=== Townships ===
- Baihe Township (白河乡) in Gansu

=== Subdistricts ===
- Baihe Subdistrict (白鹤街道), a subdistrict of Qidong County in Hunan
- Baihe Subdistrict, Ningbo (白鹤街道), a subdistrict of Jiangdong District in Ningbo prefecture-level city, Zhejiang
- Baihe Subdistrict, Nanyang (白河街道), a subdistrict of Wancheng District in Nanyang prefecture-level city, Henan

== Taiwan ==
- Baihe, Tainan (白河區)

== Terminology ==
- Chinese name for Yuri (genre) (百合), a genre depicting female same-sex relationships
- Baihe is commonly used to describe WLW content/stories in Chinese media.

== Other ==
- Baihe.com, a Chinese matchmaking company
