= Qu River (Jialing River tributary) =

Tributary of Jialing river in Sichuan and Chongqing, China

Coordinates: 30.0347°N 106.328°E

The Qu River (Chinese: 渠江) is the largest left-bank tributary of the Jialing River, which is itself a tributary of the Yangtze River. It is also called the Qu He (渠河), and was known in ancient times as "Qianshui" (潜水), also named Yanqu Water. During the Two Jin dynasties, it was called Ba River or Ba Water, and after the Song dynasty, it was officially named Qu River. According to the "Shui Jing" (Water Classic): "The Qianshui originates in Dangqu County of Ba Commandery and flows south into the [Yangtze] River." The "Han Zhi" (Han Records) also notes: "In Dangqu County of Ba Commandery, the Qianshui flows southwest into the river." Because the Qianshui ran through the entire territory of Dangqu County, it was subsequently called Qu River or Qu He.

== Geography ==
Qu River

Physical characteristics
- Mouth: Jialing River
- Length: 676 km (420 mi)
- Basin size: 38,913 km^{2} (15,024 sq mi)

Basin features
- River system: Jialing River, Yangtze River

The Qu River originates from the Daba Forest Farm in Guanba Township, Nanjiang County, Sichuan, on the southern slopes of the Micang Mountains. It flows from Sichuan to Chongqing, passing through eight counties and districts: Nanjiang, Bazhong, Pingchang, Daxian, Quxian, Guang'an, Yuechi, and Hechuan. It finally joins the Jialing River at Diaoyucheng Subdistrict in Hechuan District, Chongqing. The main channel of the Qu River is 676 kilometers long, covering a drainage area of 38,913 square kilometers. Its major tributaries include the Shentan River, Enyang River, and Tongjiang River. The upper reaches of the Qu River mainstream extend from the source to Sanhui Town in Dazhou City, while the lower reaches run from Sanhui Town to Quhe Zui in northern Hechuan, Chongqing. The Qu River experiences frequent flooding with large variations between flood and dry seasons.

The basin is located in a subtropical monsoon humid climate zone. The basin's topography is mainly mountainous with varying elevations, which facilitates the accumulation and utilization of water resources. The basin area accounts for approximately 25% of the entire Jialing River basin. From its source to Quhe Zui, it spans Hanzhong in Shaanxi Province; Bazhong, Guangyuan, Dazhou, and Guang'an in Sichuan; and Wanzhou and Hechuan districts in Chongqing. The Qu River has abundant water resources containing large amounts of organic matter and plankton, providing favorable conditions for fish reproduction and growth. The Qu River basin serves as the granary of northeastern Sichuan, particularly along both banks of the mainstream and the Zhouhe River tributary basin, where agricultural production is well-developed with high yield levels. Daxian, Quxian, Guang'an, Yuechi, and Dazhu are provincial commodity grain bases. The main crops are rice, wheat, and corn, with secondary crops including soybeans, adzuki beans, mung beans, tubers, and sorghum. Oil crops include rapeseed, peanuts, tea oil plants, and olives. The basin has established a comprehensive transportation system integrating highways, railways, waterways, and air transport.

== See also ==
- List of rivers in China
