= Jisheng =

Jisheng can be a romanization of several different Chinese-language given names. Notable people with the name include:

- Chen Jisheng (Chinese: 陈冀胜; 1932–2022), Chinese chemist
- Li Jisheng (Chinese: 李济生; 1943–2019), Chinese aerospace engineer
- Ma Jisheng (Chinese: 马继生), former Chinese diplomat
- Yang Jisheng (journalist) (Chinese: 杨继绳; born 1940), Chinese journalist and author
- Yang Jisheng (Ming dynasty) (Chinese: 杨继盛; 1516–1555), Ming dynasty court official
