= Duke Ligong of Qin =

Ruler of Qin, China from 476 to 443 BC

Duke Ligong of Qin 秦厲共公

Ruler of Qin
- Reign: 476–443 BC
- Predecessor: Duke Dao of Qin
- Successor: Duke Zao of Qin
- Died: 443 BC
- Issue: Duke Zao of Qin; Duke Huai of Qin
Posthumous name
- Duke Ligong (厲共公) or Duke Ligong (利龔公) or Duke Lagong (剌龔公) or Duke Li (厲公)
- House: Ying
- Dynasty: Qin
- Father: Duke Dao of Qin

Duke Ligong of Qin (Chinese: 秦厲共公; pinyin: Qín Lìgòng Gōng; died 443 BC), personal name unknown, was a duke of the state of Qin during the Eastern Zhou dynasty, reigning from 476 to 443 BC. Duke Ligong succeeded his father Duke Dao, who died in 477 BC, as ruler of Qin.

In 461 BC, Duke Ligong dispatched an army of 20,000 men to attack the Rong state of Dali (in present-day Dali County, Shaanxi), and captured its capital.

In 456 BC, the state of Jin attacked Qin, taking the city of Wucheng (武城, in present-day Hua County, Shaanxi).

In 453 BC, the Zhao, Han, and Wei clans of Jin jointly attacked Zhi, the most powerful of Jin's four major clans, killed its leader Zhi Yao, and divided the territory of Zhi amongst themselves. The state of Jin was effectively partitioned into three new states. Some of the survivors of the Zhi clan fled to Qin.

In 444 BC, Qin attacked Yiqu (in present-day Ning County, Gansu), another Rong state, and captured its king.

Duke Ligong reigned for 34 years and died in 443 BC. He was succeeded by his son Duke Zao.

Duke Ligong of Qin House of Ying Died: 443 BC
Regnal titles
| Preceded by Duke Dao of Qin | Duke of Qin; 476–443 BC | Succeeded by Duke Zao of Qin |
