= Liupan Mountains =

Mountain range in China

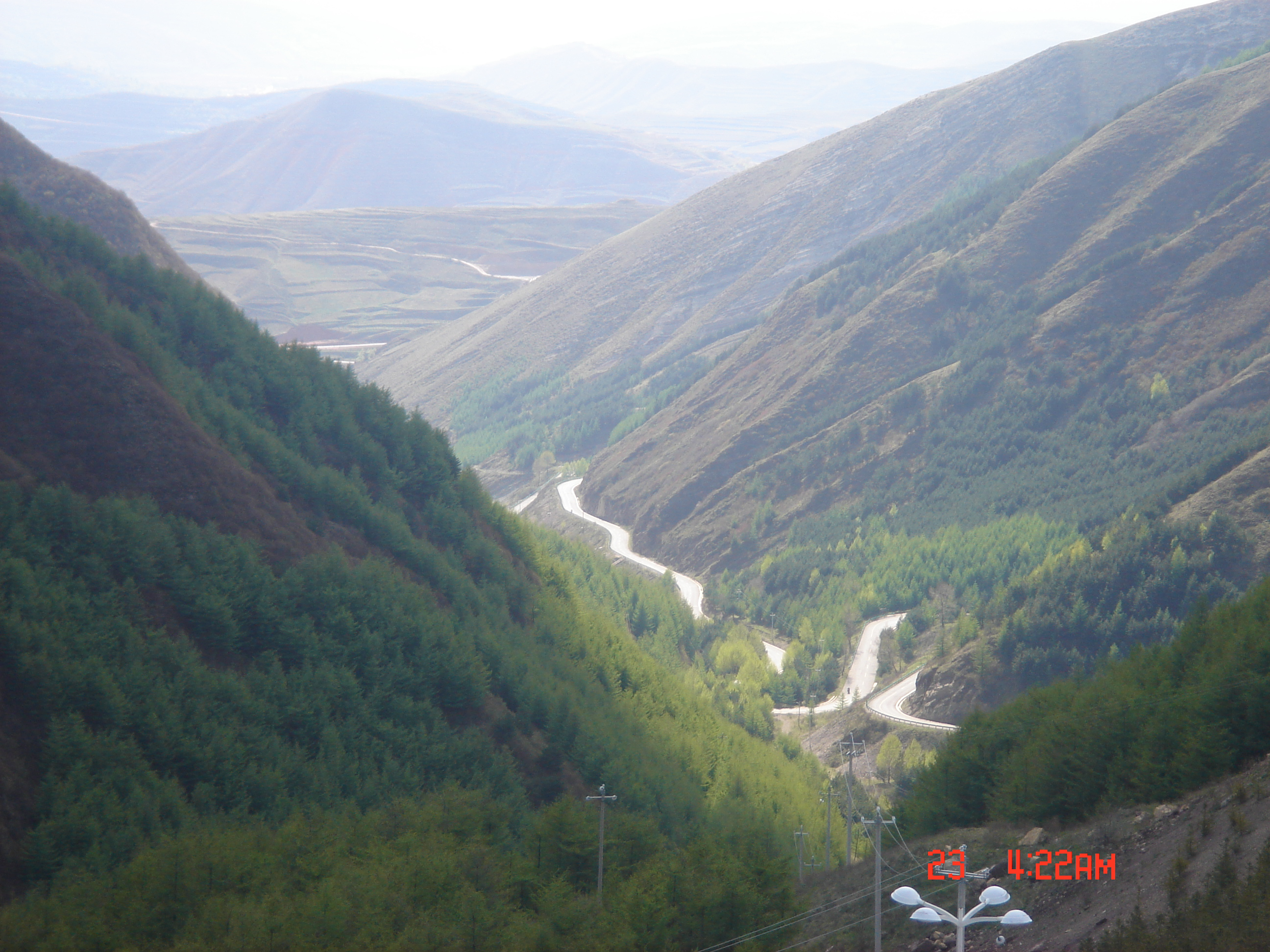

Dimensions
- Length: 240 km (150 mi)
- Width: 10 km (6.2 mi)

Naming
- Native name: 六盘山 (Chinese)

Geography

The Liupan Mountains (Chinese: 六盘山; pinyin: Lìupán Shān) are a mountain range in northwestern China, located mostly in southern Ningxia Hui Autonomous Region. The range marks the southwestern boundary of the Ordos Basin.

Its southern section is known as Mount Long (Chinese: 陇山; pinyin: Lǒng Shān), which strides southeast through eastern Gansu and western Shaanxi province before joining into the Qinling Mountains, giving rise to regional names like "Longxi" (陇西, lit. "west of Mount Long"), "Longdong" (陇东, "east of Mount Long", referring to the Jing River valley basin region around eastern Pingliang, southern Qingyang and northern Xianyang) and "Longnan" (陇南, "south of Mount Long"). It is the western boundary of the Guanzhong Plain, and is also the source of the Qian River (千河), a left tributary of the Wei River that flows through the prefectural city of Baoji.

== Poem of the same name ==
A poem of same name was dedicated to this mountain by Mao Zedong in 1935, when the Chinese Red Army arrived into the friendly Shaanbei region at the end of the Long March.

《清平乐·六盘山》 天高云淡，望断南飞雁。 不到长城非好汉，屈指行程二万。 六盘山上高峰，红旗漫卷西风。 今日长缨在手，何时缚住苍龙？	Mount Liupan The sky is high, the clouds are pale, We watch the wild geese flying south until they vanish. If we reach not the Great Wall we are no true men, Already we have come twenty thousand li. High on the crest of Mount Liupan, Banners idly wave in the west wind. Today the long cord is in our hands, When shall we bind fast the Azure Dragon?

== Geography ==
It is one of the youngest mountain ranges of China. It is relatively narrow with a width between 5 and 12 km, and a length of around 240 km. The highest peak, Migangshan (米缸山), is at 2,942 m (9,652 ft) above sea level. Owing to its orientation perpendicular to humid winds, it is considered a 'green island' within the Loess Plateau. Most of the mountain's area is covered by forests.

=== Climate ===
Climate data for Mount Liupan (elevation 2,845 m (9,334 ft), 1991–2020 normals, extremes 1981–2010)
Month	Jan	Feb	Mar	Apr	May	Jun	Jul	Aug	Sep	Oct	Nov	Dec	Year
Record high °C (°F)	7.1 (44.8)	11.4 (52.5)	16.7 (62.1)	21.7 (71.1)	23.6 (74.5)	23.1 (73.6)	25.3 (77.5)	23.6 (74.5)	22.5 (72.5)	17.0 (62.6)	13.0 (55.4)	8.1 (46.6)	25.3 (77.5)
Mean daily maximum °C (°F)	−5.3 (22.5)	−2.9 (26.8)	1.6 (34.9)	7.9 (46.2)	12.1 (53.8)	15.4 (59.7)	17.1 (62.8)	16.0 (60.8)	11.6 (52.9)	6.4 (43.5)	1.0 (33.8)	−3.8 (25.2)	6.4 (43.6)
Daily mean °C (°F)	−9.9 (14.2)	−7.7 (18.1)	−3.4 (25.9)	2.4 (36.3)	6.8 (44.2)	10.8 (51.4)	12.7 (54.9)	11.8 (53.2)	7.6 (45.7)	2.1 (35.8)	−3.2 (26.2)	−8.1 (17.4)	1.8 (35.3)
Mean daily minimum °C (°F)	−13.0 (8.6)	−10.9 (12.4)	−6.6 (20.1)	−1.2 (29.8)	3.2 (37.8)	7.5 (45.5)	9.8 (49.6)	9.0 (48.2)	5.0 (41.0)	−0.6 (30.9)	−6.2 (20.8)	−11.3 (11.7)	−1.3 (29.7)
Record low °C (°F)	−25.3 (−13.5)	−22.0 (−7.6)	−23.0 (−9.4)	−16.5 (2.3)	−9.5 (14.9)	−1.8 (28.8)	3.6 (38.5)	0.4 (32.7)	−5.3 (22.5)	−18.6 (−1.5)	−21.3 (−6.3)	−27.7 (−17.9)	−27.7 (−17.9)
Average precipitation mm (inches)	8.7 (0.34)	12.1 (0.48)	20.9 (0.82)	34.8 (1.37)	53.2 (2.09)	92.4 (3.64)	131.9 (5.19)	129.1 (5.08)	94.1 (3.70)	46.3 (1.82)	13.7 (0.54)	4.7 (0.19)	641.9 (25.26)
Average precipitation days (≥ 0.1 mm)	7.4	7.6	8.4	8.9	10.7	13.4	15.8	15.1	14.4	10.7	6.7	4.6	123.7
Average snowy days	8.3	8.4	9.0	7.0	2.4	0.2	0	0.1	0.3	6.0	6.8	5.4	53.9
Average relative humidity (%)	62	65	64	61	63	70	79	82	81	73	65	58	69
Mean monthly sunshine hours	182.0	170.8	195.0	217.1	224.3	207.1	195.6	182.0	139.3	164.7	177.3	193.5	2,248.7
Percentage possible sunshine	58	55	52	55	52	48	45	44	38	48	58	64	51
Source: China Meteorological Administration
