= Duke Gong of Qin =

Duke Gong of Qin 秦共公

Ruler of Qin
- Reign: 608–604 BC
- Predecessor: Duke Kang of Qin
- Successor: Duke Huan of Qin
- Died: 604 BC
Names
- Ying Dao (嬴稻) or Ying He (嬴和) or Ying Jia (嬴貑)
Posthumous name
- Duke Gong (共公)
- House: Ying
- Dynasty: Qin
- Father: Duke Kang of Qin

Duke Gong of Qin (Chinese: 秦共公; pinyin: Qín Gōng Gōng, died 604 BC), personal name variously recorded as Ying Dao, Ying He, or Ying Jia, was a duke of the state of Qin during the Eastern Zhou dynasty.

Duke Gong succeeded his father Duke Kang, who died in 609 BC, as ruler of Qin. He reigned for five years before dying in 604 BC. He was succeeded by his son, Duke Huan.

Duke Gong of Qin House of Ying Died: 604 BC
Regnal titles
Preceded by Duke Kang of Qin	Duke of Qin; 608–604 BC	Succeeded by Duke Huan of Qin
