= Gongbo =

Gongbo 公伯

Ruler of Qin
- Reign: 847–845 BC
- Predecessor: Marquis of Qin
- Successor: Qin Zhong
- Died: 845 BC
- House: Ying
- Dynasty: Qin
- Father: Marquis of Qin

Gongbo (Chinese: 公伯; pinyin: Gōngbó, died 845 BC), personal name unknown, was the third ruler of the state of Qin. Gongbo succeeded his father, the Marquis of Qin, who died in 848 BC, and ruled for three years. He died in 845 BC and was succeeded by his son Qin Zhong.

Although Qin would eventually develop into a major power that would conquer all other Chinese states and unite China proper to form the Qin dynasty in 221 BC, at the time of Gongbo it was still a minor state of the Western Zhou dynasty and little is known about Gongbo.

== Family ==
- Queen Meng Ji of the Ji clan (孟姬 姬氏)
  - Qin Zhong, son - fourth ruler of Qin

Gongbo House of Ying Died: 845 BC
Regnal titles
Preceded by Marquis of Qin	Ruler of Qin; 847–845 BC	Succeeded by Qin Zhong
