= Duke Xiang of Qin =

Duke Xiang of Qin 秦襄公

Ruler of Qin
- Reign: 777–766 BC
- Predecessor: Duke Zhuang of Qin
- Successor: Duke Wen of Qin
- Died: 766 BC
Names
- Ying Kai(嬴開) (Note: Neither Baike Baidu nor the Chinese Page of him states this name)
Posthumous name
- Duke Xiang (襄公)
- House: Ying
- Dynasty: Qin
- Father: Duke Zhuang of Qin

Duke Xiang of Qin (Chinese: 秦襄公; pinyin: Qín Xiāng Gōng; died 766 BC), personal name possibly Ying Kai(嬴開), was a duke of the state of Qin, ruling from 777 BC to 766 BC. He was the first Qin ruler to be granted a noble rank by the king of the Zhou dynasty; under his reign, Qin was formally recognized as a major vassal state of the Zhou dynasty.

== Accession to the throne ==
Duke Xiang was not the eldest son of his father, Duke Zhuang of Qin. Duke Zhuang had three sons, and Shifu (世父) was the eldest and therefore the legal heir. However, Shifu refused the throne, and preferred to devote his life to campaigning against the Rong tribes in order to avenge the death of his grandfather Qin Zhong, who was killed in battle against the Rong in 822 BC. Duke Xiang was then made the Crown Prince, and succeeded his father when Duke Zhuang died in 778 BC.

== War with the Rong tribes ==
Duke Xiang ruled during a time of turmoil. The Zhou dynasty had been at war with the western Rong tribes since the time of Duke Xiang's grandfather Qin Zhong. Qin, being the westernmost of the Zhou states, bore the brunt of the fighting against the Rong. Soon after Duke Xiang ascended the throne, in 777 BC he married his younger sister Mu Ying to a Rong leader called King Feng (豐王) in an apparent attempt to make peace. The following year he moved the Qin capital eastward from Quanqiu (犬丘, also called Xichui, in present-day Li County, Gansu) to Qian (汧, in present-day Long County, Shaanxi). Soon afterwards, Quanqiu fell to the Rong. Shifu, Duke Xiang's older brother who led the defence of Quanqiu, was captured by the Rong, but was released a year later.

== Enfeoffment ==
In 771 BC King You of Zhou deposed Crown Prince Yijiu and made Bofu, the son of his favorite concubine Bao Si, the new crown prince. Yijiu was the son of Queen Shen who was the daughter of the Marquis of Shen. The Marquis of Shen rebelled at the news and formed an alliance with the Quanrong tribes to attack the Zhou capital Haojing, killing King You at Mount Li. The Marquis of Shen and other feudal rulers then installed Prince Yijiu on the Zhou throne as King Ping of Zhou. As Haojing was now ruined and still under the threat of the Quanrong, it was decided that the Zhou capital would be moved east to Luoyi, and Duke Xiang sent the Qin army to escort King Ping to Luoyi and established him at the new capital. This event marked the start of the Eastern Zhou dynasty.

To reward Duke Xiang's contribution, King Ping formally granted him a noble rank and enfeoffed him as a feudal lord. Qin was now elevated from a minor "attached state" (附庸, fuyong) to a major vassal state. King Ping further promised to give Qin the land west of Qishan, the former heartland of Zhou, if Qin could expel the Rong tribes that were occupying the land.

== Death and succession ==
In 766 BC, the 12th year of his reign, Duke Xiang died while campaigning against the Quanrong in Qishan. He was succeeded by his son, Duke Wen of Qin. He was buried in Quanqiu and his tomb has been discovered in Li County, Gansu Province.

Duke Xiang of Qin House of Ying Died: 766 BC
Regnal titles
| Preceded by Duke Zhuang of Qin | Duke of Qin; 777–766 BC | Succeeded by Duke Wen of Qin |
