= Duke Kang of Qin =

Duke Kang of Qin 秦康公

Ruler of Qin
- Reign: 620–609 BC
- Predecessor: Duke Mu of Qin
- Successor: Duke Gong of Qin
- Died: 609 BC
Names
- Ying Ying (嬴罃)
Posthumous name
- Duke Kang (康公)
- House: Ying
- Dynasty: Qin
- Father: Duke Mu of Qin
- Mother: Mu Ji (穆姬; daughter of Duke Xian of Jin)

Duke Kang of Qin (Chinese: 秦康公; pinyin: Qín Kāng Gōng, died 609 BC), personal name Ying Ying, was a ruler of the state of Qin during the Eastern Zhou dynasty.

== History ==
Duke Kang was one of the 40 sons of Duke Mu of Qin, and succeeded Duke Mu as ruler of Qin when he died in 621 BC. In the same year Duke Xiang of Jin also died, starting a succession crisis in Qin's neighbouring state, Jin. Zhao Dun, the powerful minister of Jin, initially wanted to install Duke Xiang's younger brother Prince Yong on the Jin throne. Prince Yong was at the time exiled in Qin, and in 620 BC Qin sent an army to escort Yong back to Jin. However, Zhao Dun soon changed his mind and instead made Duke Xiang's young son Yigao the ruler, later known as Duke Ling of Jin. Jin then dispatched an army to stop Prince Yong, and defeated the Qin escort force at Linghu.

The Jin succession dispute began a series of conflicts between Qin and Jin. A year after the battle at Linghu, Qin invaded Jin and took the city of Wucheng (武城, in present-day Hua County, Shaanxi) in revenge. Two years later, in 617 BC Jin attacked Qin in return, taking Shaoliang (少梁, in present-day Hancheng, Shaanxi). Then in 615 BC Qin counterattacked again, taking Jima (羈馬). Jin dispatched an army to repel Qin, and the two forces met at nearby Hequ (河曲, present-day Fenglingdu, Ruicheng County), but both retreated without engaging in battle.

Duke Kang reigned for 12 years and died in 609 BC. He was succeeded by his son, Duke Gong of Qin. He is credited with having written the song Wei-yang in honor of his mother Mu Ji (穆姬).

Duke Kang of Qin House of Ying Died: 609 BC
Regnal titles
Preceded by Duke Mu of Qin	Duke of Qin; 620–609 BC	Succeeded by Duke Gong of Qin
