= Baihe Town, Gansu =

Baihe 白河镇
- Town
- Location within Gansu
- Coordinates: 33°52′N 104°51′E
- Country: China

Government
  - Mayor: Meng Yucheng (孟禹成)

Area
  - Total: 185.46 km^{2} (71.61 sq mi)
- Elevation: 1,600 m (5,200 ft)

Population (2008)
  - Total: 19,769
- Postal code: 746000
- Area code: 0939

Baihe is a town in the southwest of Li County, Gansu. The townhall is located in Baihejia village. It is an agricultural trading town. It is known for rhubarb cultivation.

In 1941 Baihe township was established. In 1952 Baihe, Houwan and Gutao villages were split to separate townships. In 1983 Baihe township was re-established.

Baihe town administers 22 villages, the largest being Baihe, Zhulin, and Quanshui.
