= Cao Dong (footballer) =

Chinese footballer (born 1997)

Cao Dong 曹栋
Personal information
- Date of birth: 10 November 1997 (age 29)
- Place of birth: Longnan, Gansu, China
- Height: 1.82 m (5 ft 11 1/2 in)
- Position: Midfielder

Youth career
- Hangzhou Greentown
- 2016–2017: Shanghai Shenhua
- 2017: → Chongqing Liangjiang (loan)

Senior career*
Years	Team	Apps	(Gls)
2018–2021	Chongqing Liangjiang	18	(1)
2021	→ Suzhou Dongwu (loan)	11	(0)
2022	→ Quanzhou Yassin (loan)		
2022	Shanghai Jiading Huilong	11	(0)
- * Club domestic league appearances and goals as of 6 May 2022

Cao Dong (Chinese: 曹栋; pinyin: Cáo Dòng; born 10 November 1997) is a Chinese footballer.

== Club career ==
Cao Dong was promoted to Chinese Super League side Chongqing Dangdai Lifan's first team squad in 2018. On 3 March 2018, he made his senior debut in a 1–0 home win against Beijing Renhe, coming on as a substitute for Wu Qing in the 67th minute.

== Career statistics ==
As of 31 December 2020.

Appearances and goals by club, season and competition
Club	Season	League			National Cup		Continental		Other		Total	
Club	Season	Division	Apps	Goals	Apps	Goals	Apps	Goals	Apps	Goals	Apps	Goals
Chongqing Dangdai	2018	Chinese Super League	16	1	2	0	-		-		18	1
Chongqing Dangdai	2019	Chinese Super League	0	0	0	0	-		-		0	0
Chongqing Dangdai	2020	Chinese Super League	2	0	1	0	-		-		3	0
Chongqing Dangdai	Total		18	1	3	0	0	0	0	0	21	1
Career total			18	1	3	0	0	0	0	0	21	1
