= Duke Zao of Qin =

Ruler of Chinese state of Qin from 442 to 429 BC

Duke Zao of Qin 秦躁公

Ruler of Qin
- Reign: 442–429 BC
- Predecessor: Duke Ligong of Qin
- Successor: Duke Huai of Qin
- Died: 429 BC
Posthumous name
- Duke Zao (躁公) or Duke Zao (趮公)
- House: Ying
- Dynasty: Qin
- Father: Duke Ligong of Qin

Duke Zao of Qin (Chinese: 秦躁公; pinyin: Qín Zào Gōng, died 429 BC), personal name unknown, was a duke of the state of Qin during the Eastern Zhou dynasty, reigning from 442 to 429 BC. Duke Zao succeeded his father Duke Ligong, who died in 443 BC, as ruler of Qin.

In 441 BC, the Qin city of Nanzheng (in present-day Hanzhong) rebelled. In 430 BC, the Rong state of Yiqu invaded Qin, advancing to the Wei River.

Duke Zao reigned for 14 years and died in 429 BC. He was succeeded by his younger brother Duke Huai, who had been exiled in the state of Jin.

Duke Zao of Qin House of Ying Died: 429 BC
Regnal titles
Preceded by Duke Ligong of Qin	Duke of Qin; 442–429 BC	Succeeded by Duke Huai of Qin
