= Jialing River =

River in China

Coordinates: 29.5711°N 106.581°E

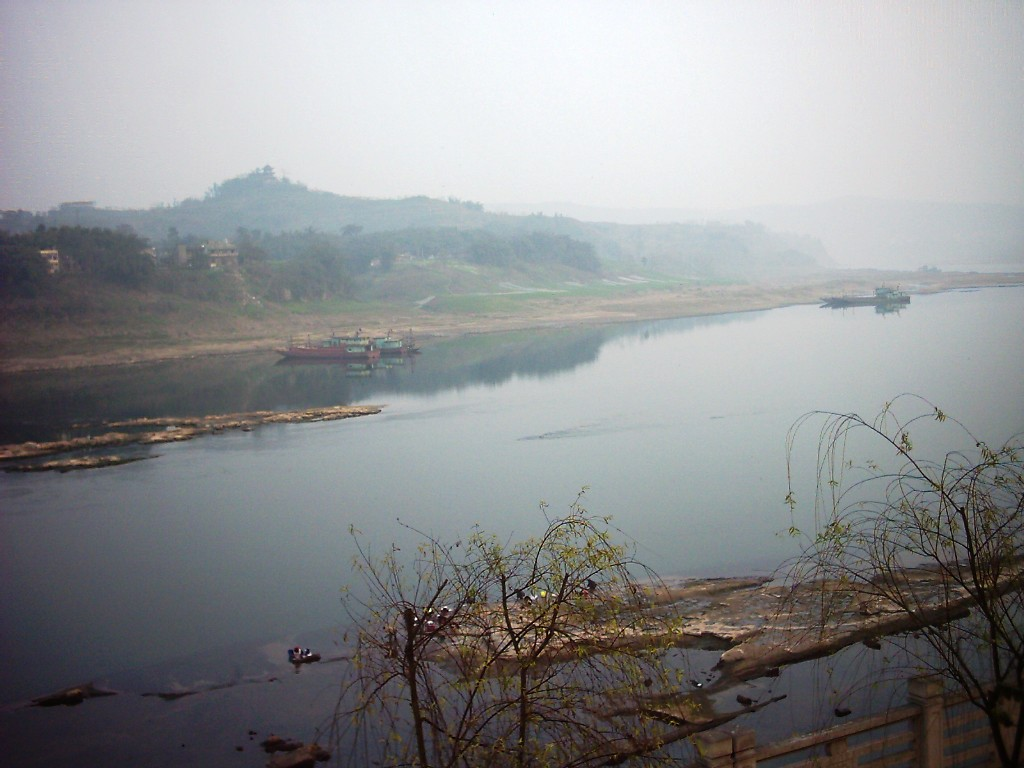
- The Jialing in Hechuan, Chongqing

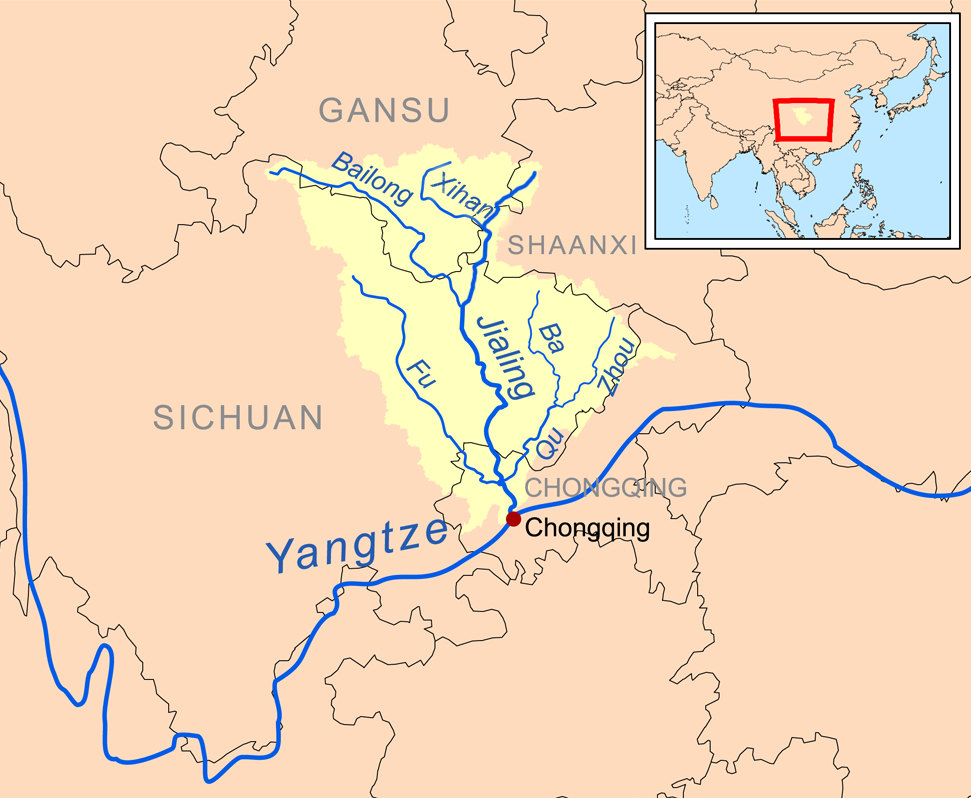
- The Jialing Basin

Location
- Country: China

Physical characteristics
- Source
  - location: Mount Qinling
  - elevation: 2,819 m (9,249 ft)
- Mouth: Yangtze River
- Length: 1,117.3 km (694.3 mi)
- Basin size: 159,800 km^{2} (61,700 sq mi)
- Discharge
  - average: 2,120 m^{3}/s (75,000 cu ft/s)

Basin features
- Tributaries
  - left: Qu River
  - right: Xihan River; Bailong River; Fu River

The Jialing River, (Note: In addition to those in the infobox above, former romanizations include Kea-ling and Kia-ling.) formerly known by numerous other names, is a major tributary of the Yangtze River in the Sichuan Basin. It is named after the Jialing Valley in Feng County, Shaanxi through which it flows.

The Jialing River's most notable characteristic was formerly its pellucid green waters. It is also notable for its sinuous course in its lower reaches. From Zhangwang Miao (Temple of Zhangfei) in Langzhong to the mouth, the distance as the crow flies is 223 kilometres (139 mi). However the river itself travels 1,117.3 kilometres (694.3 mi). The most tortuous part of its course is between Nanchong and Wusheng County.

== Names ==
The name Jialing did not come into general use until the Tang Dynasty. Before that, it was generally known as the Ba, although it also appears as the Lang and Yu as well. In the 19th century, it was known by the Sichuanese as the Small or Little River, (Note: Also romanized as the Siao Ho.) by comparison with the Jinsha and Yangtze.

== Geography ==
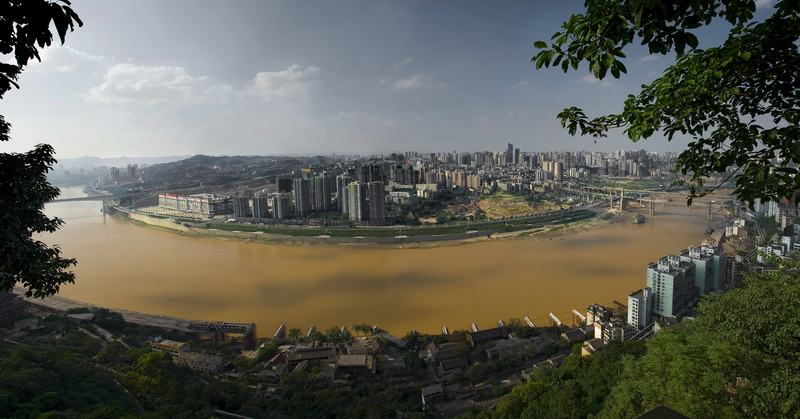
The Jialing in Chongqing

The source of the Jialing, in name, is in the Jialin, which means "the tomb of Jia (嘉陵)" in Chinese. Jia (赵代王嘉) was the last king of State Zhao (赵国), who was kidnapped to State Qin (now called Tianshui, Gansu Province, 甘肃省天水市) after Qin defeated Zhao. The river briefly flows through Gansu before reentering Shaanxi and then crossing south into Sichuan.

The longest stem of the Jialing River, however, can be traced to a source in Aba Tibetan and Qiang Autonomous Prefecture, Sichuan and the entire river is 1,345 kilometres (836 mi) long. This source is located at the head of the Baozuo River, considered a tributary of the Bailong River, itself the primary tributary and main stem of the Jialing River system. The branches named Jialing and Bailong meet in Guangyuan in Sichuan and continue as the Jialing to the Yangtze. The river reaches the floor of the Sichuan Basin at Langzhong and continues in a sinuous route into Chongqing and its junction with the Yangtze River.

Besides the Bailong River which forms a portion of the main stem, the largest tributaries of the Jialing River include the Xihan River, the Fu River (also known as Sui He), and the Qu River. The Xihan meets the Jialing in Shaanxi, while both the Fu and the Qu join the Jialing's respective right and left banks in Hechuan, Chongqing.

The cities along the Jialing's course include Tianshui, Baoji, Longnan, Guangyuan, Langzhong, Nanchong, and Chongqing. Cities found within the Jialing's basin and along its tributaries include Tianshui, Baoji, Longnan, Longnan, Mianyang, Suining, Bazhong, Wanyuan, Dazhou, and Guang'an.

== Fauna ==
A total of 151 species of fish inhabit the river, of which 51 species are endemic to the Yangtze River basin.

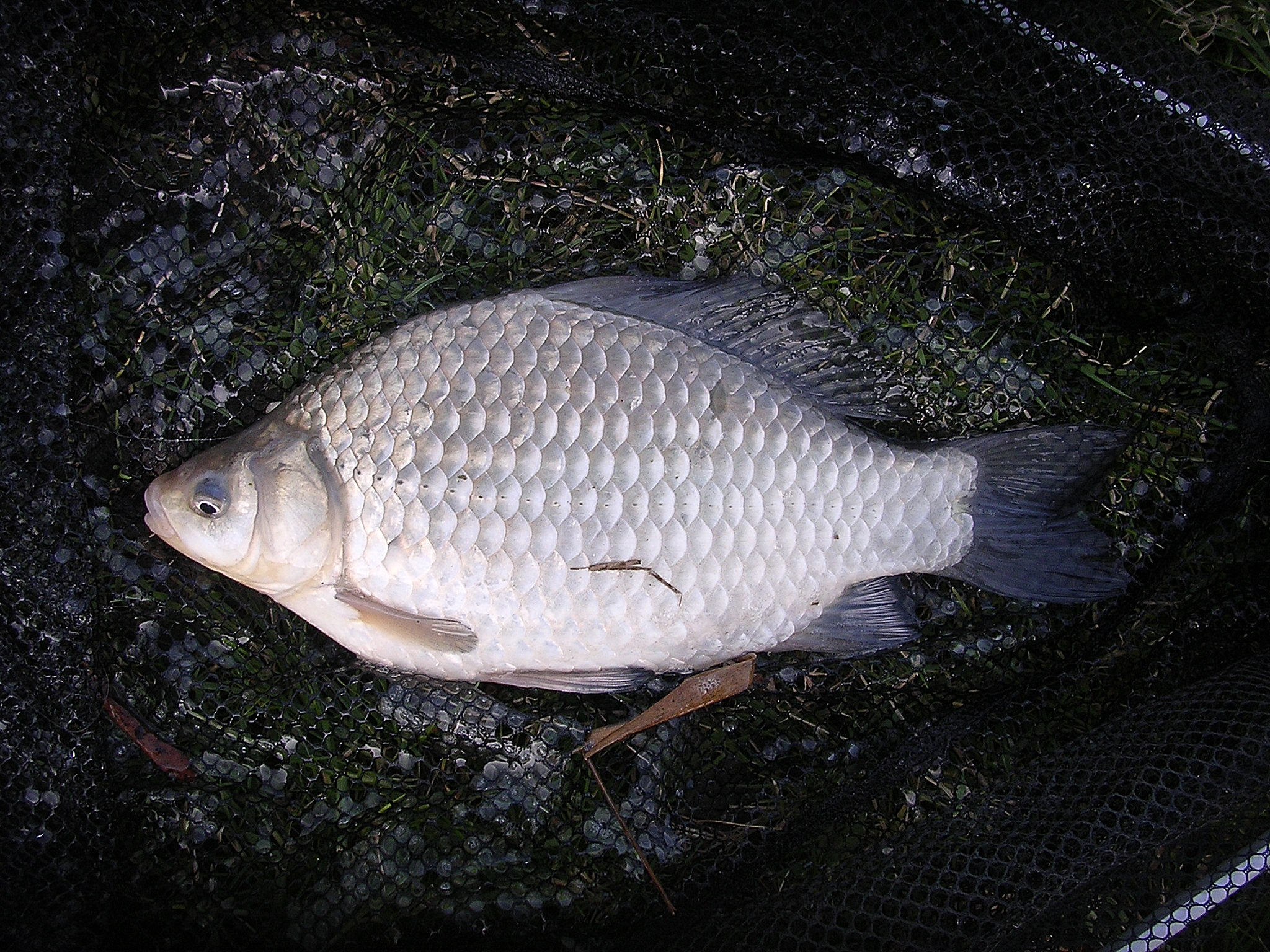
Carassius auratus

== History ==
The Han and Jialing basins were the heartland of the ancient state of Ba, whose major cities were located at the sites of their tributaries' confluences. The Jialing assumed greater importance when Chu expanded up the Han during the 5th and 4th centuries BC.

The Jialing figures in one of the legends surrounding the Tang-era artist Wu Daozi. During the Kaiyuan Era of the Emperor Xuanzong, Wu was commissioned to depict the course of the Jialing and sent to Sichuan to travel its length for the work. Supposedly, he returned to the imperial palace and completed it in a single day from memory. It is sometimes added that his technique was foiled by Li Sixun, who accompanied him and followed the traditional practice of working slowly from numerous prepared sketches. To the extent that it is grounded in a real event, however, it probably only reflects Wu's speed of execution and not a lack of reliance on sketches.

Around 1880, four out of Chongqing's 24 shipping guilds were concerned with shipping along the Jialing. Chongqing, Lingshi, Lezhi, and Hechuan all developed shipyards. In the 1920s, five of Chongqing's eight ferry guilds plied routes across the Jialing.

Following the end of the Chinese Civil War in 1949, the river was repeatedly dredged and straightened until it was navigable throughout the year by the early 1970s.
