= Chen Jisheng =

Chinese army general and scientist (1932–2022)

- 陈冀胜
- Born: 15 July 1932; Tianjin, China
- Died: 19 October 2022 (aged 90); Beijing, China
- Scientific career
- Education: Fudan University; Tsinghua University
- Fields: Military medicine; Pharmaceutical chemistry
- Workplaces: Institute of Chemical Prevention Science and Technology; 13th Research Institute of National Defense Science and Technology Commission; People's Liberation Army General Staff Department; Chemical Prevention Research Institute of the PLA Academy of Military Sciences
- Military career
- Allegiance: China
- Branch: People's Liberation Army Ground Force
- Rank: Major general
- Unit: People's Volunteer Army
- Conflicts: Korean War

Chen Jisheng (simplified Chinese: 陈冀胜; traditional Chinese: 陳冀勝; pinyin: Chén Jìshèng; 15 July 1932 – 19 October 2022) was a Chinese medical officer and pharmaceutical chemist, and an academician of the Chinese Academy of Engineering. He was a member of the Chinese Communist Party and a major general (shaojiang) in the People's Liberation Army.

== Biography ==
Chen was born in Tianjin, on 15 July 1932. In 1937, by age 5, his family fled the Second Sino-Japanese War and finally settled down in Chongqing, where he passed his basic education. In September 1942, Chen joined the underground party organization of the Chinese Communist Party (CCP) when he was a chemistry major at Fudan University.

In 1950, the Korean War broke out, in response to the call of the Communist Party, Chen was the first to sign up and mobilized eight students to join the People's Liberation Army (PLA), becoming chemical prevention cadets. Due to chemical defense cadets need professional knowledge, they were sent to Tsinghua University, Peking University and other universities to continue their studies. After graduating from Tsinghua University in July 1952, he became a teacher at the Chemical Warfare School. He joined the Institute of Chemical Prevention Science and Technology in October 1954, and moved to the 13th Research Institute of National Defense Science and Technology Commission in March 1970. He was a deputy director of a research institute of the People's Liberation Army General Staff Department in July 1981 and subsequently party secretary and deputy director of the Chemical Prevention Research Institute of the PLA Academy of Military Sciences in January 1983. He attained the rank of major general (shaojiang) in 1990.

On 19 October 2022, he died of an illness in Beijing, at the age of 90.

== Publications ==
- Chen Jisheng; Zheng Shuo (郑硕), eds. (1987). 中国有毒植物 [Toxic Plants in China] (in Chinese). Beijing: Science Press.

== Honours and awards ==
- 1999 Member of the Chinese Academy of Engineering (CAE)
