= E Jun Qi =

Lord of the State of E (Warring States period)

E Jun Qi (Chinese: 鄂君啟) was the lord of the state of E during the Warring States period. He was the son of the King Huai of Chu.

E Jun Qi is mostly known due to the uniquely shaped tallies addressed to him by the king. The tallies were discovered in Shou County, Anhui Province, in April 1957.

== Literature ==
- Falkenhausen, Lothar von. “The E Jun Qi Metal Tallies: Inscribed Texts and Ritual Contexts.” In Text and Ritual in Early China, ed. Martin Kern, 79–123. Seattle: University of Washington Press, 2005.
