= Duke Huai of Qin =

Ruler of the Chinese state of Qin from 428 to 425 BC

Duke Huai of Qin 秦懷公

Ruler of Qin
- Reign: 428–425 BC
- Predecessor: Duke Zao of Qin
- Successor: Duke Ling of Qin
- Died: 425 BC
- Issue: Zhaozi (昭子); Duke Jian of Qin
Posthumous name
- Duke Huai (懷公)
- House: Ying
- Dynasty: Qin
- Father: Duke Ligong of Qin

Duke Huai of Qin (Chinese: 秦懷公; pinyin: Qín Huái Gōng; died 425 BC), personal name unknown, was a duke of the state of Qin during the Eastern Zhou dynasty, reigning from 428 to 425 BC.

Duke Huai was the younger son of Duke Ligong, who died in 443 BC and was succeeded by Duke Zao, Duke Huai's older brother. When Duke Zao died in 429 BC, Duke Huai was in exile in the state of Jin. He returned to Qin and took the throne.

In 425 BC, the fourth year of Duke Huai's reign, Qin general Chao (鼌) and other ministers rebelled against Duke Huai. Duke Huai was besieged and committed suicide. As his son Crown Prince Zhaozi (昭子) died early, the ministers installed Zhaozi's son Duke Ling on the throne. Duke Huai also had a younger son, later known as Duke Jian, who would succeed Duke Ling as the 26th ruler of Qin.

Duke Huai of Qin House of Ying Died: 425 BC
Regnal titles
Preceded by Duke Zao of Qin	Duke of Qin; 428–425 BC	Succeeded by Duke Ling of Qin
