= Long County, Shaanxi =

Coordinates: 34°50′05″N 106°47′23″E

Long County 陇县
- County
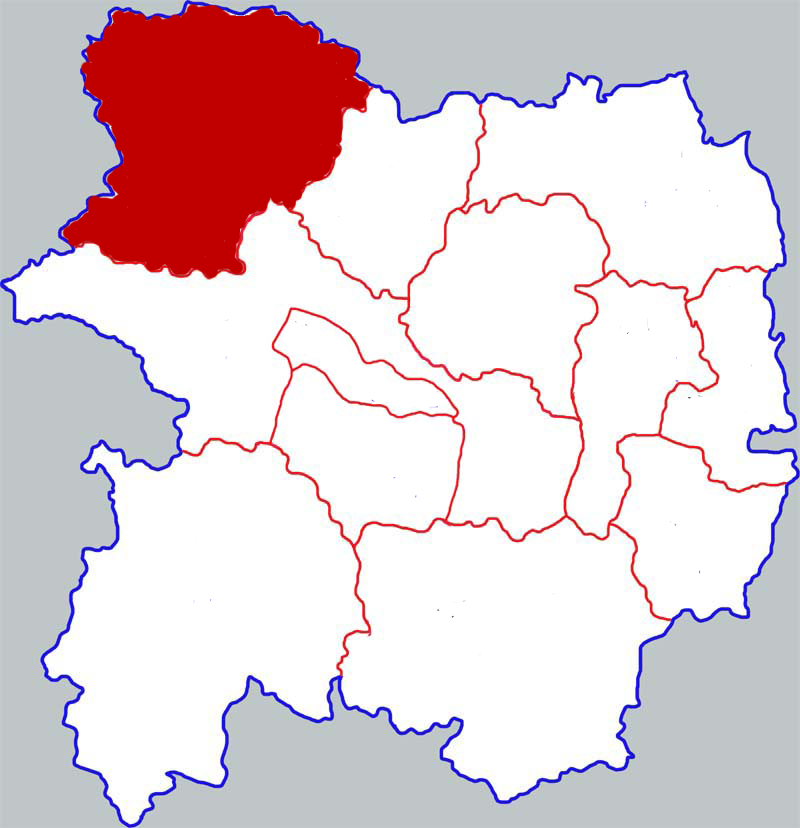
- Location of Long county within Baoji
- Country: People's Republic of China
- Province: Shaanxi
- Prefecture-level city: Baoji

Area
  - Total: 2,285 km^{2} (882 sq mi)
- Highest elevation: 2,466 m (8,091 ft)
- Lowest elevation: 800.2 m (2,625 ft)

Population (2019)
  - Total: 252,500
  - Density: 110.5/km^{2} (286.2/sq mi)
- Time zone: UTC+8 (China standard time)
- Postal Code: 721200
- Website: www.longxian.gov.cn

Long County or Longxian (simplified Chinese: 陇县; traditional Chinese: 隴縣; pinyin: Lǒng Xiàn) is a county of Baoji, in the west of Shaanxi province, China, bordering Gansu province to the north and west.

== History ==
Longxian was formerly known as Longzhou (陇州), and named for being east of Longshan, which is the southern part of the Liupan mountain range between Baoji and Guyuan, Ningxia. It used to be the capital of King Zhuangxiang of Qin.

== Geography ==
The county is 60% covered by forests and considered an important water source for the region with 49 streams and rivers.

== Climate ==
Climate data for Longxian, elevation 924 m (3,031 ft), (1991–2020 normals, extremes 1981–2010)
Month	Jan	Feb	Mar	Apr	May	Jun	Jul	Aug	Sep	Oct	Nov	Dec	Year
Record high °C (°F)	17.4 (63.3)	23.7 (74.7)	29.2 (84.6)	33.7 (92.7)	34.2 (93.6)	39.5 (103.1)	39.5 (103.1)	37.2 (99.0)	38.0 (100.4)	30.9 (87.6)	25.4 (77.7)	20.2 (68.4)	39.5 (103.1)
Mean daily maximum °C (°F)	4.3 (39.7)	7.9 (46.2)	13.7 (56.7)	20.0 (68.0)	24.3 (75.7)	28.8 (83.8)	29.8 (85.6)	27.5 (81.5)	22.7 (72.9)	17.2 (63.0)	11.4 (52.5)	5.7 (42.3)	17.8 (64.0)
Daily mean °C (°F)	−2.1 (28.2)	1.4 (34.5)	6.9 (44.4)	12.8 (55.0)	17.2 (63.0)	21.7 (71.1)	23.8 (74.8)	22.1 (71.8)	17.3 (63.1)	11.5 (52.7)	5.0 (41.0)	−0.8 (30.6)	11.4 (52.5)
Mean daily minimum °C (°F)	−6.4 (20.5)	−3.0 (26.6)	1.7 (35.1)	6.7 (44.1)	11.1 (52.0)	15.8 (60.4)	18.8 (65.8)	17.9 (64.2)	13.5 (56.3)	7.6 (45.7)	0.7 (33.3)	−5.0 (23.0)	6.6 (43.9)
Record low °C (°F)	−15.8 (3.6)	−15.0 (5.0)	−9.0 (15.8)	−4.0 (24.8)	−0.8 (30.6)	7.0 (44.6)	12.1 (53.8)	8.4 (47.1)	4.3 (39.7)	−5.0 (23.0)	−10.9 (12.4)	−20.4 (−4.7)	−20.4 (−4.7)
Average precipitation mm (inches)	4.9 (0.19)	8.0 (0.31)	19.6 (0.77)	30.5 (1.20)	53.0 (2.09)	72.3 (2.85)	106.9 (4.21)	111.2 (4.38)	93.0 (3.66)	47.3 (1.86)	14.2 (0.56)	3.6 (0.14)	564.5 (22.22)
Average precipitation days (≥ 0.1 mm)	4.0	5.0	6.8	6.8	10.1	10.2	11.0	11.8	12.2	10.5	5.4	2.6	96.4
Average snowy days	5.6	5.5	2.7	0.1	0	0	0	0	0	0	2	3.9	19.8
Average relative humidity (%)	61	63	62	63	66	67	73	80	82	78	72	64	69
Mean monthly sunshine hours	138.1	131.7	164.2	189.1	205.0	202.7	190.4	162.7	123.7	129.0	141.1	145.1	1,922.8
Percentage possible sunshine	44	42	44	48	47	47	44	40	34	37	46	48	43
Source: China Meteorological Administration

== Economy ==
Longxian is known for goat milk, walnuts, apples and honey.

== Administrative divisions ==
Longxian administers 10 towns which include 104 incorporated villages.

Towns

- Chengguan (城关镇)
- Dongfeng (东风镇)
- Badu (八渡镇)
- Dongnan (东南镇)
- Wenshui (温水镇)
- Tiancheng (天成镇)
- Caojiawan (曹家湾镇)
- Guguan (固关镇)
- Hebei (河北镇)
- Xinjichuan (新集川镇)
