= Jie Prefecture (Gansu) =

Former zhou in China

Jiezhou or Jie Prefecture (階州) was a zhou (prefecture) in imperial China in modern Longnan, Gansu, China. It existed (intermittently) from 892 to 1913.

== Geography ==
The administrative region of Jiezhou in the Tang dynasty falls within modern Longnan in southern Gansu. It probably includes modern:

- Wudu District
- Kang County
