= Duke Zhuang of Qin =

Duke Zhuang of Qin 秦莊公

Ruler of Qin
- Reign: 821–778 BC
- Predecessor: Qin Zhong
- Successor: Duke Xiang of Qin
- Died: 778 BC
- Issue: Shifu (世父); Duke Xiang of Qin; Mu Ying (wife of King Feng)
Names
- Ying Qi (嬴其 or 嬴祺)
Posthumous name
- Duke Zhuang (莊公)
- House: Ying
- Dynasty: Qin
- Father: Qin Zhong

Duke Zhuang of Qin (Chinese: 秦莊公; pinyin: Qín Zhuāng Gōng; died 778 BC), personal name Ying Qi, was a monarch of the state of Qin. He reigned from 821 BC to 778 BC.

== Reign ==
Duke Zhuang became the ruler of Qin after his father Qin Zhong was killed in battle against the Rong tribes in 822 BC. King Xuan of Zhou gave Duke Zhuang and his four younger brothers seven thousand soldiers, and they defeated the Rong. King Xuan then awarded Qin the territory of Quanqiu (犬丘, also called Xichui, in present-day Li County, Gansu), formerly belonging to the senior branch of the Ying clan which was previously destroyed by the Rong, and Duke Zhuang moved the capital of the state from Qin (in present-day Zhangjiachuan County, Gansu) to Quanqiu.

== Family ==
Duke Zhuang had three sons. The eldest, Shifu (世父), refused the throne, preferring to campaign against the Rong tribes who killed his grandfather, Qin Zhong. Duke Zhuang died in 778 BC after a reign of 44 years and was succeeded by his second eldest son Duke Xiang of Qin. Duke Zhuang's daughter, Mu Ying (缪嬴), entered a political marriage with Rong leader King Feng (豐王) in 777 BC.

== Posthumous title ==
Although the state of Qin grew much bigger and stronger after Duke Zhuang's victory against the Rong, Qin was still a minor state at the time and its rulers did not have a noble rank. However, Duke Zhuang's son Duke Xiang would later be granted a formal noble rank by King Ping of Zhou as a reward for protecting the king during the Quanrong invasion that drove the Zhou from their western capital, and Duke Zhuang would also be posthumously granted the honorific title of duke.

Duke Zhuang of Qin House of Ying Died: 778 BC
Regnal titles
Preceded by Qin Zhong	Ruler of Qin; 821–778 BC	Succeeded by Duke Xiang of Qin
