= Xihan River =

River in China

Coordinates: 34.3167°N 105.5833°E

The Xihan or Western Han River (Chinese: traditional: 西漢水, simplified 西汉水; Xīhànshuǐ) is a northern tributary of the Jialing River, itself a tributary of the Yangtze in Sichuan. Within China, it is also known as the "Rhinoceros River" (犀牛江, Xīniújiāng).

The "Western" in its name distinguishes this river from the Han River, today known in Chinese as the Hanjiang (漢江) but historically known as the Hanshui (漢水).

== See also ==
- Han River (汉江)
