= Qin Zhong =

Qin Zhong 秦仲

Ruler of Qin
- Reign: 844–822 BC
- Predecessor: Gongbo
- Successor: Duke Zhuang of Qin
- Died: 822 BC
- Issue: Duke Zhuang of Qin
- House: Ying
- Dynasty: Qin
- Father: Gongbo

Qin Zhong or Zhong of Qin (Chinese: 秦仲; pinyin: Qín Zhòng, died 822 BC), personal name unknown, was a ruler of the state of Qin, reigning from 844 BC to 822 BC. Qin Zhong succeeded his father Gongbo, who died in 845 BC.

In 842 BC, the people of Zhou revolted against King Li of Zhou, overthrowing him the following year, and the country fell into turmoil. The Xirong tribes that lived near Qin also rebelled, exterminating the senior branch of the Ying clan at Quanqiu (present-day Lixian, Gansu Province). After King Xuan of Zhou ascended the Zhou throne in 827 BC, he made Qin Zhong commander of his forces in the campaign against the Xirong.

Qin Zhong reigned for 22 years until 822 BC, when he was killed in battle against the Xirong. He was succeeded by Duke Zhuang of Qin, the eldest of five sons. King Xuan of Zhou gave Qin Zhong's sons seven thousand soldiers; with this army, they defeated the Rong and recovered their patrimony. King Xuan of Zhou then awarded Qin the territory of Quanqiu, formerly held by the other branch of the Ying clan, and Duke Zhuang of Qin moved his capital from Qin to Quanqiu.

Qin Zhong House of Ying Died: 822 BC
Regnal titles
Preceded by Gongbo	Ruler of Qin; 844–822 BC	Succeeded by Duke Zhuang of Qin
