= Xianyang (Qin) =

Capital of the Qin dynasty

Qin Xianyang City Ruins
- 秦咸阳城遗址 (Chinese)
- Interactive map of Qin Xianyang City Ruins
- 34°24′50″N 108°51′28″E
- Location: Weicheng District, Xianyang; Weiyang District, Xi'an

History
- Built: 350 BC

Xianyang (simplified Chinese: 咸阳; traditional Chinese: 咸陽) was the last capital city of the state of Qin between 350 and 206 BC. After Qin Shi Huang unified China and founded the Qin dynasty in 221 BC, the city also briefly served as the first capital of Imperial China. Xianyang was sacked and burned to the ground by forces of the warlord Xiang Yu in 206 BC.

The Qin-era city of Xianyang was located in the center of the Guanzhong Plain, to the east of the modern Xianyang city and north of Xi'an. While ancient Xianyang was originally founded to the north of the Wei River, the city's ruins are now scattered along both banks due to the city's expansion and a later change of the river's course. The Han capital city of Chang'an, founded in 202 BC, was located in its immediate vicinity.

== History ==
Xianyang was founded in 350 BC during the reign of the Duke Xiao of Qin, replacing Yueyang as the capital city of the Qin state. The characters xian (咸; "all") and yang (陽) refer to its location to the north of the Wei River and south of the Jiuzong Mountain (九嵕山). In Chinese toponymy, north banks of rivers and south-facing slopes of mountains are both considered yang (i.e., sunny sides). Its location was chosen by Shang Yang, reformer and Daliangzao (chancellor) of Qin, for its strategetic importance at the intersection of major rivers and roads. In a break with tradition, Shang Yang did not start building the city with an ancestral temple, but instead with palace gates where the government posted official documents and pronouncements. These gate towers, known as Jique (冀闕), were part of the Xianyang Palace complex. The city and its palace were expanded during King Huiwen's reign (338–311 BC).

Qin Shi Huang massively expanded the city after he unified China in 221 BC. According to the Records of the Grand Historian, 120,000 prominent families from across the empire were relocated to Xianyang, and faithful copies of their original dwellings, including palaces of the conquered kingdoms, were built around the capital. A series of imperial highways known as Chidao (馳道) was built in an arc radiating from Xianyang. In 212 BC, unsatisfied with the existing palaces in Xianyang, Qin Shi Huang ordered the construction of an enormous palace complex to the south of the Wei River, known as the Epang Palace. However, this new palace would never be completed.

In the winter of 207 BC, Ziying, the last ruler of Qin, surrendered the capital to Liu Bang, rebel leader and the future founder of the Han dynasty, who spared the city from destruction. However, when Xiang Yu entered the city two months later, he executed Ziying and burned Xianyang and its palaces to the ground. Ministers of the Han dynasty recognized the strategetic importance of the site, and a new capital, Chang'an, was founded to the south, directly across the river. However, the ruins of Xianyang were left abandoned. Several imperial mausoleums of the Han were constructed within the city's ruins.

== Layout ==
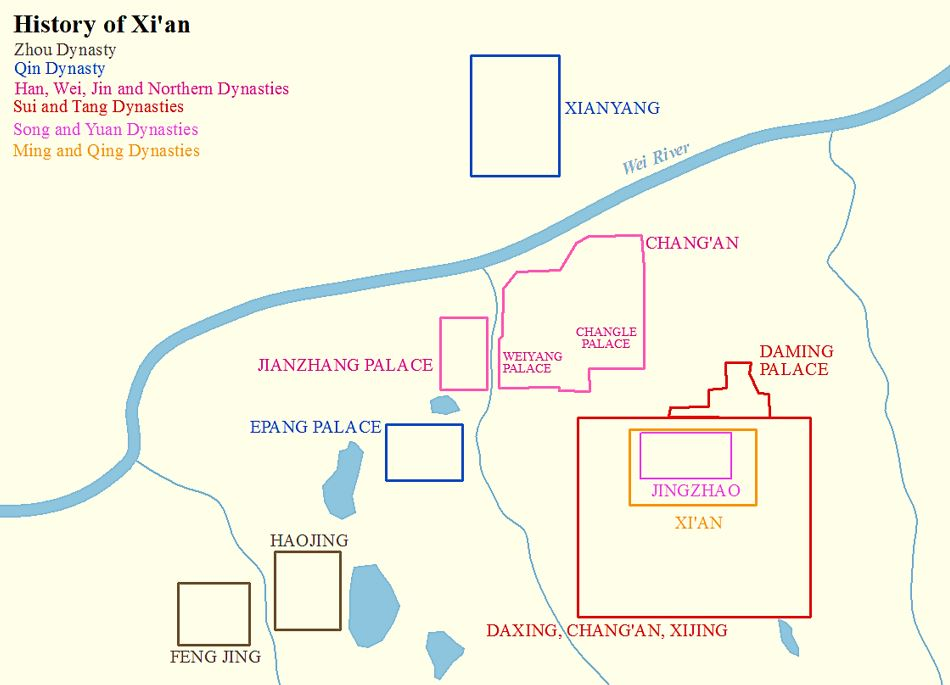
Locations of Xianyang of the Qin dynasty (blue), Chang'an of the Han dynasty (purple), Chang'an of the Tang dynasty (red), and the modern-day walled city of Xi'an (yellow)

The ancient city was located between the high Xianyang Plain (咸阳塬) and the Wei River valley. To date, no city walls have been discovered, and therefore Xianyang's extent remains uncertain. Liu Qingzhu believed that the city measured 7.2 kilometres (4.5 mi) east to west, and 6.7 kilometres (4.2 mi) north to south. Other researchers have proposed that Xianyang was an unwalled open city whose buildings were scattered across a vast area on both sides of the Wei River. In the center of the high plain, a rectangular rammed-earth wall has been discovered and identified by the excavators as the wall of the Xianyang Palace.

Surrounding the palace walls, sites of warehouses and handicraft workshops have been discovered. An armory located 500 metres (1,600 ft) to the north produced pieces of sacrificial stone armor that were identical to those found in the Terracotta Army. The site of a large burnt-down building measuring 110 metres (360 ft) by 21 metres (69 ft) was identified as the Music Bureau based on unearthed inscriptions and musical instruments.

A series of Qin palaces lay beyond the Wei River on its southern bank, including the Zhangtai (章臺) and Xingle (興樂) palaces, which were connected to the Xianyang Palace on the northern bank by a long bridge, as well as Qin Shi Huang's unfinished Epang Palace. The Xingle Palace escaped destruction after the fall of Qin. It was later renamed Changle (長樂) and became part of the imperial palace of the Han dynasty. Beyond the southern palaces was the Shanglin Park (上林苑), royal park of the Qin kings. In total, 270 palaces were built within a radius of 200 li around Xianyang.

While Xianyang developed organically during its early history, Qin Shi Huang sought to remodel the expanded imperial capital based on Chinese astrology after founding the Qin dynasty. A newly constructed Polar Shrine (極廟) dedicated to the emperor himself symbolized the Celestial Pole, the Wei River corresponded to the Milky Way, and imperial palaces, gardens and mausoleums around the city were mapped to the four celestial sectors. Xianyang represented a highly innovative example of ancient Chinese urban design which had a lasting influence on later Chinese cities.
