= Xianyang Palace =

Qin dynasty palace in Shaanxi, China

- 咸陽宮 (Xiányáng Gōng) (Chinese)
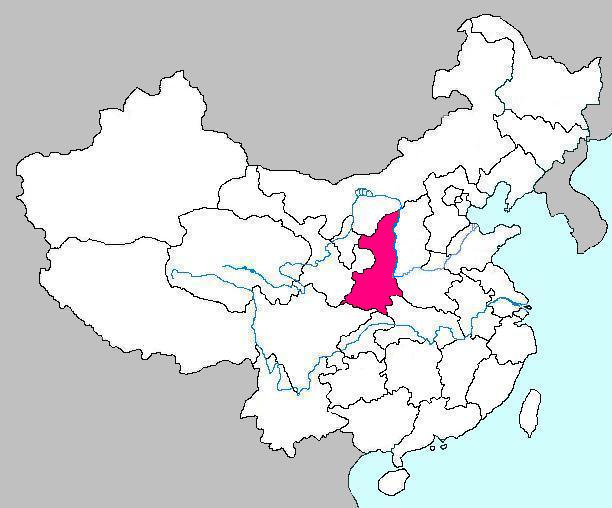
- Interactive map of Xianyang Palace
- 34.415817°N 108.862563°E
- Location: Weicheng District, Xianyang, Shaanxi, China

History
- Period: Warring States / Qin Dynasty
- Built: 350 BCE
- Built for: First Emperor of China: Qin Shi Huang
- Demolished: 206 BCE

Xianyang Palace (Chinese: 咸陽宮) was the royal palace complex of the State of Qin and later the palace of the First Emperor of China during the Qin Dynasty. It was located 15 kilometres (9.3 mi) west of Xi'an City, Shaanxi Province, east of Xianyang City, Shaanxi Province.

The Xianyang Palace was the core of the capital and the political center of Xianyang City. The palace was a complex terraced building, and had elaborate murals inside. It was built in the 4th century BCE and burnt down by Xiang Yu after the fall of the Qin dynasty in 206 BCE. Archaeological excavation of the Xianyang Palace includes three sites: Xianyang Palace No.1, Xianyang Palace No.2, and Xianyang Palace No.3.

The layout of Xianyang Palace has long been a subject of scholarly debate. Most Chinese imperial capitals constructed fortified city walls beyond the palace complexes for military defense. However, no archaeological evidence of such walls has yet been found at the site of Xianyang.

In January 1988, the State Council of the People's Republic of China officially designated the "Site of Qin Xianyang City" as part of the third batch of Major Historical and Cultural Sites Protected at the National Level.

== History ==
=== State of Qin ===
According to the Records of the Grand Historian, in the 12th year of Duke Xiao of Qin (350 BC), Gongsun Yang, the Daliangzao, carried out the framework of Xianyang was laid out alongside the construction of the Memorial Gate and many of the palaces and garden in Xianyang, leading to Xianyang becoming the capital of the State of Qin. In addition, smaller villages and hamlet were grouped together to form large districts with each district overseen by a Magistrate and long narrow ridges were demolished extending the Qin surpassing the Luo river.

During the 144 years that Xianyang served as Qin capital, the early political center lay north of the Wei River around Jique palace, lasting until about the 4th year of King Wu (307 BC); during King Zhao's reign (306–251 BC), political focus shifted south of the Wei River.

=== Qin Dynasty ===
After the unification of China in 221 BCE, Qin Shi Huang continued to expand the city complex of Xianyang. According to Shiji, Qin Shi Huang commissioned new structures and replicated architectural features from conquered states within the capital region. Later texts also described the palace follows a cosmic-inspired city planning: the “Zigong Palace” (紫宫) corresponds with the celestial Purple Palace, bridges across the Wei River symbolize the Milky Way and Altair, and the Xin Palace (信宫) as an earthly counterpart to the Northern Dipper.

According to Shiji, during this period of time, Qin Shi Huang also initiated the construction of the Epang Palace (阿房宮) to the south of the Wei River, which corresponds to southern “morning palace” in the cosmic planning, signifying a full shift of political authority. Although traditionally believed to be the southern palace intended to replace the Xianyang Palace, archaeological evidence suggests that the Epang Palace might have never been completed.

=== Destruction ===
In 207 BCE, the rebel leader, later first emperor of the Han Dynasty, Liu Bang captured Xianyang and accepted the surrender of Prince Ziying, the last emperor of Qin. According to Shiji, the palace was temporarily sealed, and soon Liu Bang withdrew to Bashang. Shortly after, another prominent rebel leader Xiang Yu entered Xianyang, executed Ziying, and burned the Xianyang Palace, which later records described to burn for an extended period of three month.

== Archaeological Excavation ==
=== Excavation History ===
Systematic excavations of the Xianyang Palace started in 1959, led by the Shaanxi Provincial Institute of Archaeology and the Shaanxi Provincial Cultural Relics Administration. In 1961, an investigation on the northern bank of the Wei River discovered the Palace Site No.6, which was later renamed Palace Site No.1. The general layout of the Xianyang Palace was determined through massive drilling done between November 1973 and April 1974, when the rectangular Palace City walls were found.

Since the start of the study, archaeologists surveyed a 72 square kilometer area of the ruins. Centered on Yaodian in Weicheng District, more than 230 sites were found, including palace complexes, workshop remains, and other structures from the Qin dynasty. Major excavations were carried out on Palaces No. 1, No. 2, and No. 3 of Xianyang Palace, covering a total of 15,000 square meters

More recent excavation works were conducted in 2018, when a major high-platform administrative complex that includes a large group of state government buildings was uncovered. This site was later named Palace Site No. 6.

=== Key Discoveries ===
The systematic excavation at the Xianyang Palace site has uncovered several key high-platform complexes:

- Palace Site No.1: This was a side tower outside the palace, a symmetrical dual-tower gateway with an extensive drainage system.
- Palace Site No.2: Evidence suggests this complex to be the palace of the Empress.
- Palace Site No.3: This was the primary administrative core of the entire palace complex.
- Palace Site No.6: A large administrative complex.

=== Interpretation Debates ===
==== City Wall Debate ====
There are several theories regarding the city walls of Xianyang. Although no remains of the walls have been found, ruins of earlier capitals such as Yongcheng and Liyang have been discovered. Scholar Wu Bolun suggested that the city walls might have been washed away due to changes in the Wei River's course; however, other ancient cities like Luoyang and Bianliang also experienced river changes but still left behind traces of city walls. Scholarly opinions include:

- Palace-only theory: Wang Xueli
- Palace and wall theory: Wu Bolun, Wang Pizhong, Liu Qingzhu
- Walls without palace: Sun Derun
- Uncertain: Shi Xingbang

==== West City and East Outer City Debate ====
Discussions exist regarding the functions of different sections of the city. Yang Kuan argues the west side was the inner palace city while the east side was an outer city. Other scholars argue the inner palace city was in the middle surrounded by the outer city.

==== River Erosion Debate ====
A long-standing dispute concern to what extent has the Xianyang Palace survived. Some scholars believe most of the sites were washed away by the northward migration of the Wei River, while other scholars argue that the northern core of the site has survived.

==== Central Axis Debate ====
While Chinese capital cities usually were organized around a central axis, it has been impossible to identify such an axis in the Xianyang Palace City due to constant reconstruction.

== Architecture ==
=== Layout ===
The Xianyang Palace's Palace City, or Gongcheng, was a rectangular fortified area with a length of about 870m east to west and a width of about 500m north to south, with a total perimeter of approximately 2,747 meters. This palace complex was densely packed: over 20 earthen building bases were discovered within the area. The layout corresponds to the cosmic order described in earlier texts, with the Wei River symbolizing the Milky Way and the palace buildings as celestial bodies.

Various sections within the palace complex were connected by a network of feige, or "flying corridors," yongdao, or "cover ways," and elevated causeways. These structures allowed the emperor to travel between palaces privately.

=== Palaces ===
Palaces of the State of Qin and Qin Dynasty
Palaces	Native Name	Other Names	Location	Additional Information
Xianyang Palace	咸陽宮 (Xián Yáng Gōng)		Located in the Yaochen Subdistrict, Wei Chang District.	Ruins Museum was established on the western side in 1995.
Epang Palace	阿房宫 (Ā fáng gōng)		Located south of the Wei River	The front hall of Epang measured up to 500 bu from east to west and 50 zhang north to south
Lanchi Palace	蘭池宮 (Lán Chí Gōng)		Located near Yangjiawan and Baijiazui	Ruins were found on the west bank of the "Lanchi" pond
Yongmen Palace	雍門宮 (Yōng mén gōng)		Located west of the old Qin capital and, east to the Jing and Wei River	The site has been destroyed by years by mother nature. Copper artifacts and compacted soils remains were reported.
Wangyi Palace	望夷宮		Located north of the Wei River, now resides near Fulongzhuang, north of modern Xi'an	Rammed-earth platforms and buildings are visible.
Zhangtai Palace	章台宮 (Zhāng Tái Gōng)		Located south of the Wei River. Now resides in modern Xi'an	
Ganquan Palace	甘泉宮 (Gān Quán Gōng)	Palace of Sweet Springs, South Palace	Resides from a road for the Apex Temple to Mt. Li	
Ba Palace / Zhiyang Palace	霸宮 (Bà Gōng)/芷陽宮(Zhǐ Yáng Gōng)		Located in Zhiyang, east of the Ba River and near Mt. Li. Now resides in Lintong County.	
Huangshan Palace or Hengshan Palace	黃山宮/橫山宮 (Huáng Shān Gōng/Héng Shān Gōng)		Located west of Xianyang city, near modern day Xingping City	
Xingle Palace	興樂宮		Constructed on the site later occupied by Han Dynasty Changle Palace	

=== Workshops and Residences ===
Handicraft workshops were distributed in the northern and southwestern areas of the palace district. There were both official government-run workshops and private ones. The residents of Xianyang were mainly artisans and merchants, living in the western and southwestern parts of the city, while farmers were spread out in the suburbs.

=== Construction Technology ===
Buildings in the Xianyang Palace were mainly constructed on gaotai, or high-platform architecture. These high-platform foundations were built with rammed earth (hangtu). The excavation site Xianyang Palace No.1 includes a large rammed earth high platform with a length of 60m and a width of 45m, where different rooms, such as bedrooms and galleries, were built on.

The building materials used in the construction of the Xianyang Palace were standardized. A specific type of hollow brick (kongxin zhuang) was used as the stepping stones of high platforms and barrier bricks for corridors. These hollow bricks also share similar decorative features, such as dragon or geometric patterns.

The murals in the Xianyang Palace were produced with a mature technique. The murals were created in a three-layer structure: a mud-based plaster layer, a white ground layer, and a final paint layer.

== Current State ==
=== Conservation and Development ===
In January 1988, the Xianyang Palace archaeological excavation site was designated by the State Council of the People's Republic of China as part of the third group of Major Historical and Cultural Sites Protected at the National Level. This placed the preservation of the site under the supervision of state officials.

=== Museum ===
The archaeological site of Xianyang Palace has been turned into Qin Xianyang Palace Site Museum.

Address: Southwest corner of the Qin Xianyang City Ruins along County Road 007, Weicheng District, Xianyang City, Shaanxi Province

Hours: 9:30-17:00 Wednesday-Monday

=== Qin Xianyang City National Archaeological Site Park ===
The Qin Xianyang Palace Site Museum is part of the larger archaeological site that includes the Xianyang Palace, the Qin Xianyang City Site, which has been turned into an archaeological site park. In the year 2025, the Qin Xianyang City Archaeological Site Park was named a National Archaeological Site Park.

The archaeological site park is planned to be over 5,000 mu, using Qin's rise from reform to unifying China as the main theme to build a provincial archaeological display and experience center.
