= Duke Xian of Qin (424–362 BC) =

Ruler of Chinese state of Qin from 384 to 362 BC

Duke Xian of Qin 秦獻公

Ruler of Qin
- Reign: 384–362 BC
- Predecessor: Chuzi II
- Successor: Duke Xiao of Qin
- Born: 424 BC
- Died: 362 BC (aged 61–62)
- Issue: Duke Xiao of Qin
Names
- Ying Shixi (嬴師隰) or Ying Lian (嬴連)
Posthumous name
- Duke Xian (獻公) or Duke Yuanxian (元獻公) or King Yuan (元王)
- House: Ying
- Dynasty: Qin
- Father: Duke Ling of Qin

Duke Xian of Qin (Chinese: 秦獻公; pinyin: Qín Xiàn Gōng, 424–362 BC), personal name Ying Shixi or Ying Lian, was a duke of the state of Qin during the Eastern Zhou dynasty, reigning from 384 to 362 BC.

== Accession to the throne ==
Duke Xian was the son of Duke Ling of Qin, the 25th ruler of the state of Qin. However, when Duke Ling died in 415 BC, the throne was passed to Duke Ling's uncle Duke Jian, instead of his son. Duke Jian reigned for 15 years and was succeeded by his son Duke Hui II, who died 13 years later in 387 BC, and was then succeeded by his son Chuzi II. As Chuzi was only a baby, the power was controlled by his mother, duchess dowager Qin Xiaozhu. In 385 BC, the second year of Chuzi's reign, the minister Jun Gai (菌改) rebelled against Chuzi and the duchess. He led his forces to escort Duke Xian, who was at the time exiled in the State of Wei, back to Qin, killed Chuzi and his mother, and installed Duke Xian on the throne.

== Reforms ==
By the time Duke Xian finally became the monarch of Qin thirty years after the death of his father, decades of internal turmoil had greatly weakened the formerly powerful state of Qin. The neighbouring state of Wei, on the other hand, grew stronger and annexed Qin's Hexi territory, west of the Yellow River.

=== Abolition of human sacrifice ===
As soon as he ascended the throne, Duke Xian began a series of reforms. In 384 BC, the first year of his reign, he abolished the practice of funereal human sacrifice started nearly three centuries before by Duke Wu, the tenth ruler of Qin, who had 66 people buried with him in 678 BC. The fourteenth ruler Duke Mu had 177 people buried with him in 621 BC, including several senior government officials. Afterwards, the people of Qin wrote the famous poem Yellow Bird to condemn this barbaric practice, later compiled in the Confucian Classic of Poetry, but the practice would still continue for more than two centuries until Duke Xian abolished it. Modern historian Ma Feibai considers the significance of Duke Xian's abolition of human sacrifice to Chinese history comparable to that of Abraham Lincoln's abolition of slavery to American history.

=== Moving the capital ===
In 383 BC, the second year of his reign, Duke Xian moved the Qin capital from the long-time capital Yong (in present-day Fengxiang, Shaanxi) several hundred kilometers east to Yueyang (in present-day Yanliang District of Xi'an). The move shifted the center of Qin closer to other states such as Wei, Han, and Zhao, facilitated commerce, and weakened the powerful aristocratic clans that were entrenched in the old capital.

=== Establishing counties ===
Duke Xian expanded the practice of establishing counties, which were administered by bureaucrats appointed by the central government. This was a major departure from the then-prevalent practice of granting fiefs to hereditary aristocrats who ran their territories like small autonomous states. Duke Xian established several counties in Pu, Lantian, Pumingshi, and even in the new capital Yueyang. This reform strengthened the power of the central government, and would be further expanded to the whole state by the famous reformer Shang Yang under Duke Xian's successor Duke Xiao, contributing to Qin's rise and eventual unification of China.

== War with Wei ==
In 364 BC, Qin and the state of Wei fought at Shimen (in present-day Yuncheng, Shanxi), and the Qin army for the first time inflicted a major defeat on Wei, until then the strongest power of the Warring States period, reportedly killing 60,000 Wei soldiers. King Xian of Zhou, the nominal ruler of China, congratulated Duke Xian and Duke Xian declared himself the Hegemon of China.

Two years later, Qin attacked Wei again at Shaoliang (少梁, in present-day Hancheng, Shaanxi) and captured Wei general Gongsun Cuo (公孙痤).

== Death and succession ==
Duke Xian reigned for 23 years and died in 362 BC at the age of 62. He was succeeded by his son Duke Xiao of Qin. He was buried in Xiaoyu, near his capital Yueyang.

== Family ==
Sons:

- First son, Crown Prince Quliang (太子渠梁; 381–338 BC), ruled as Duke Xiao of Qin from 361 to 338 BC
- Second son, Prince Jichang (公子季昌)
- Prince Qian (公子虔)
  - Served as the Grand Tutor of King Huiwen of Qin

== In popular culture ==
Duke Xian appeared in the 2009 Chinese TV series The Qin Empire. He was played by the actor Xu Huanshan.

Duke Xian of Qin House of Ying Born: 424 BC Died: 362 BC
Regnal titles
Preceded by Chuzi II	Duke of Qin; 384–362 BC	Succeeded by Duke Xiao of Qin
