= Wei Cheng =

Wei Cheng may refer to:

- Wei Zheng (580–643), Tang dynasty statesman and historian. His name is rendered as "Wei Cheng" in Wade–Giles.
- Cheng Wei (born 1983), Chinese business executive. His surname is Cheng.
- Fortress Besieged, a 1947 Chinese novel by Qian Zhongshu
- a character that appears in Grand Theft Auto V

== See also ==
- Weicheng (disambiguation)
