= Fajing =

Fajing may refer to:

- Canon of Laws, a 5th-century BC administrative law code by Li Kui
- Fa jin, a term used in some Chinese martial arts related to the use of internal power
