= Chuzi II =

Ruler of Qin, China, from 386 to 385 BC

Chuzi of Qin 秦出子

Ruler of Qin
- Reign: 386–385 BC
- Predecessor: Duke Hui II of Qin
- Successor: Duke Xian of Qin
- Born: 389 or 388 BC
- Died: 385 BC (aged 3 or 4)
- House: Ying
- Dynasty: Qin
- Father: Duke Hui II of Qin
- Mother: Qin Xiaozhu

Chuzi II (Chinese: 出子; pinyin: Chūzǐ; 389 BC or 388–385 BC), personal name possibly Ying Chang(嬴昌), was a duke of the state of Qin during the Eastern Zhou dynasty, reigning from 386 to 385 BC. He was the second of two child rulers of Qin known in historiography as "Chuzi". He is also variously referred to as Duke Chu of Qin (秦出公), Shaozhu of Qin (秦少主), or Xiaozhu of Qin (秦小主); Shaozhu and Xiaozhu both mean "Young Lord".

Chuzi II was the grandson of Duke Jian, who was the uncle of his predecessor Duke Ling. When Duke Ling died in 415 BC, the throne passed to his uncle Duke Jian instead of his son, the later Duke Xian. Duke Jian reigned for 15 years and was succeeded by his son, Chuzi's father Duke Hui II, who reigned for 13 years and died in 387 BC. When Chuzi II succeeded his father as ruler of Qin he was either one or two years old, and the state of Qin was effectively controlled by his mother, duchess dowager Qin Xiaozhu. Just two years later, in 385 BC a minister in the government, Jun Gai (菌改), rebelled against Chuzi II and the duchess. He led his forces to escort Duke Xian, who was at the time exiled in the state of Wei, back to Qin, killed Chuzi II and his mother and installed Duke Xian on the throne. Chuzi II was three or four years old when he died.

Chuzi II House of Ying Born: 389 or 388 BC Died: 385 BC
Regnal titles
| Preceded by Duke Hui II of Qin | Duke of Qin; 386–385 BC | Succeeded by Duke Xian of Qin |
