= Duke Hui II of Qin =

Ruler of Qin from 399 to 387 BC

Duke Hui of Qin 秦惠公

Ruler of Qin
- Reign: 399–387 BC
- Predecessor: Duke Jian of Qin
- Successor: Chuzi II
- Died: 387 BC
Posthumous name
- Duke Hui (惠公)
- House: Ying
- Dynasty: Qin
- Father: Duke Jian of Qin

Duke Hui II of Qin (Chinese: 秦惠公; pinyin: Qín Huì Gōng; died 387 BC), personal name unknown, was a duke of the state of Qin during the Eastern Zhou dynasty, reigning from 399 to 387 BC. He was the second of two rulers of Qin with the posthumous name of "Hui".

Duke Hui II's father, Duke Jian, was the uncle of his predecessor Duke Ling. When Duke Ling died in 415 BC, the throne was passed to his uncle Duke Jian instead of his son, the later Duke Xian. Duke Hui II then succeeded his father when Duke Jian died in 400 BC after reigning for 15 years.

In 387 BC, the thirteenth year of Duke Hui II's reign, Qin attacked the kingdom of Shu and took Nanzheng. Later that year, Duke Hui II died and was succeeded by his young son, Chuzi II. Chuzi II was then either one or two years old, and the throne was controlled by his mother, duchess dowager Qin Xiaozhu. Just two years later, in 385 BC, the minister Jun Gai (菌改) rebelled against Chuzi II and the duchess. He led his forces to escort Duke Xian, who was at the time exiled in the state of Wei, back to Qin, killed Chuzi II and his mother, and installed Duke Xian on the throne.

Duke Hui II of Qin House of Ying Died: 387 BC
Regnal titles
Preceded by Duke Jian of Qin	Duke of Qin; 399–387 BC	Succeeded by Chuzi II
