= Yanliang, Xi'an =

Yanliang 阎良区
- District
- Interactive map of Yanliang
- Coordinates: 34°39′54″N 109°14′08″E
- Country: People's Republic of China
- Province: Shaanxi
- Sub-provincial city: Xi'an

Area
  - Total: 244.55 km^{2} (94.42 sq mi)

Population (2017)
  - Total: 294,700
  - Density: 1,139.26/km^{2} (2,950.7/sq mi)
- Time zone: UTC+8 (China Standard)
- Postal code: 710089

Yanliang District (simplified Chinese: 阎良区; traditional Chinese: 閻良區; pinyin: Yánliáng Qū) is one of nine districts of Xi'an, the capital of Shaanxi province, China. The northernmost and least-populous of Xi'an's county-level divisions, it borders the prefecture-level cities of Xianyang to the west and Weinan to the northeast and Lintong District to the south.

Yanliang District is home to the Xi'an Aircraft Industrial Corporation, a subsidiary of the Chinese state-owned aircraft manufacturing company AVIC. The company is involved in major military and civilian aircraft projects and operates an airfield on the company campus for aircraft testing and internal transportation. Entry into the campus as heavily restricted because of its heavy involvement with state and military information.

Aircraft manufacturing is the most prominent industry in Yanliang, and serves as one of its biggest, if not the biggest source of employment.

Yanliang railway station, which is served by the Houma–Xi'an railway and Xianyang–Tongchuan railway, is located in the district.

== History ==
Yanliang District was the site of the Qin capital of Yueyang.

== Administrative divisions ==
As of October 2021, Yanliang District is divided to 7 subdistricts.

- Fenghuang Road Subdistrict (凤凰路街道)
- Xinhua Road Subdistrict (新华路街道)
- Zhenxing Subdistrict (振兴街道)
- Xinxing Subdistrict (新兴街道)
- Beitun Subdistrict (北屯街道)
- Wutun Subdistrict (武屯街道)
- Guanshan Subdistrict (关山街道)
