= YNY =

YNY may refer to:

- YNY, the Amtrak station code for Yonkers station, New York, United States
- YNY, the China Railway Telegraph code for Yanliang railway station, Xi'an, Shaanxi, China
- YNY, the IATA code for Yangyang International Airport, Gangwon, South Korea
