= Qin Xiaozhu =

Duchess consort of Duke Hui II of Qin (died 385 BC)

Qin Xiaozhu (Chinese: 秦小主夫人; died 385 BC), personal name unknown,(also Xiaozhu Furen, "little ruler's lady") was the duchess consort of Duke Hui II of Qin. After her husband's death, she served as regent of the Chinese Duchy of Qin during the minority of her son Chuzi II between 387 and 385 BC.

She and her son were deposed and killed by the minister Jun Gai (菌改), who placed Duke Xian of Qin (424–362 BC) on the throne.

== Issue ==
1. Chuzi II
