= Changwu County =

Coordinates: 35.1486°N 107.984°E

Changwu County 长武县
- County
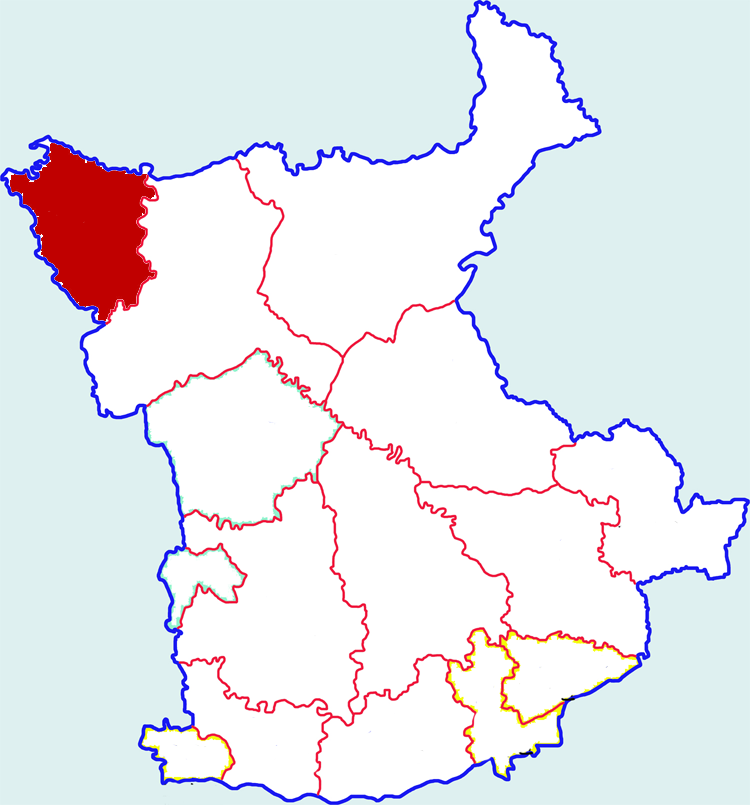
- Changwu in Xianyang

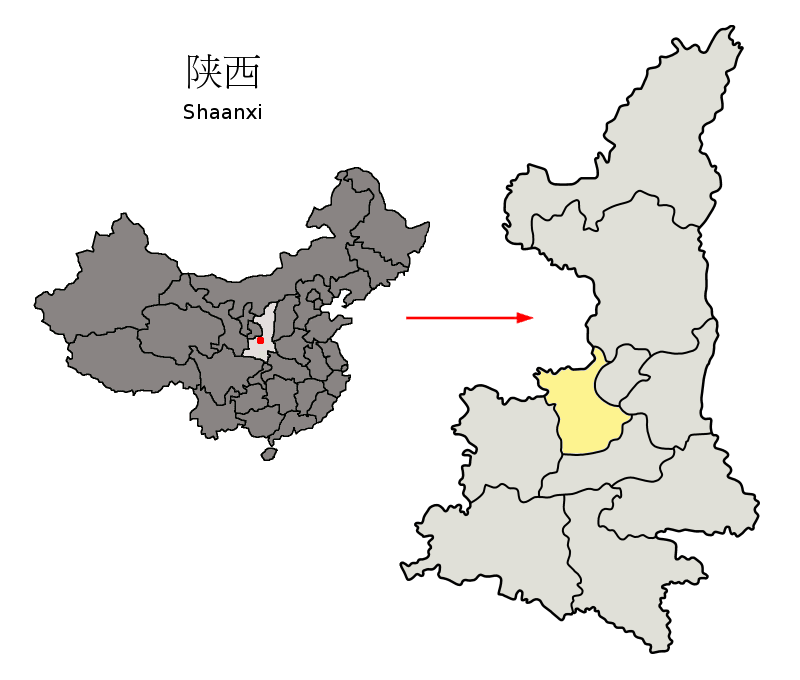
- Xianyang in Shaanxi
- Country: People's Republic of China
- Province: Shaanxi
- Prefecture-level city: Xianyang

Area
  - Total: 567.3 km^{2} (219.0 sq mi)

Population (2016)
  - Total: 170,878
  - Density: 301.2/km^{2} (780.1/sq mi)
- Time zone: UTC+8 (China standard time)
- Postal Code: 713600

Changwu County (simplified Chinese: 长武县; traditional Chinese: 長武縣; pinyin: Chángwǔ Xiàn) is a county in the central part of Shaanxi province, China, bordering Gansu province to the north, west, and southwest. It is under the administration and occupies the northwest corner of Xianyang City.

== Administrative divisions ==
One subdistrict:

- Zhaoren Subdistrict (昭仁街道)

Seven towns:

- Xianggong (相公镇), Jujia (巨家镇), Dingjia (丁家镇), Hongjia (洪家镇), Tingkou (亭口镇), Penggong (彭公镇), Zaoyuan (枣园镇)

== Climate ==
Climate data for Changwu, elevation 1,207 m (3,960 ft), (1991–2020 normals, extremes 1981–2010)
Month	Jan	Feb	Mar	Apr	May	Jun	Jul	Aug	Sep	Oct	Nov	Dec	Year
Record high °C (°F)	14.2 (57.6)	21.3 (70.3)	27.8 (82.0)	33.2 (91.8)	33.9 (93.0)	36.1 (97.0)	37.6 (99.7)	34.4 (93.9)	34.4 (93.9)	28.7 (83.7)	21.1 (70.0)	17.1 (62.8)	37.6 (99.7)
Mean daily maximum °C (°F)	1.9 (35.4)	5.8 (42.4)	12.0 (53.6)	18.8 (65.8)	22.9 (73.2)	26.8 (80.2)	28.1 (82.6)	26.2 (79.2)	21.2 (70.2)	15.4 (59.7)	9.4 (48.9)	3.4 (38.1)	16.0 (60.8)
Daily mean °C (°F)	−4.4 (24.1)	−0.4 (31.3)	5.5 (41.9)	11.8 (53.2)	16.1 (61.0)	20.3 (68.5)	22.3 (72.1)	20.6 (69.1)	15.7 (60.3)	9.4 (48.9)	2.9 (37.2)	−2.7 (27.1)	9.8 (49.6)
Mean daily minimum °C (°F)	−9.3 (15.3)	−5.1 (22.8)	0.3 (32.5)	5.4 (41.7)	9.5 (49.1)	14.1 (57.4)	17.3 (63.1)	16.3 (61.3)	11.5 (52.7)	4.9 (40.8)	−1.8 (28.8)	−7.4 (18.7)	4.6 (40.4)
Record low °C (°F)	−24.6 (−12.3)	−22.8 (−9.0)	−12.5 (9.5)	−6.6 (20.1)	−1.7 (28.9)	4.0 (39.2)	9.0 (48.2)	5.7 (42.3)	0.9 (33.6)	−8.5 (16.7)	−18.9 (−2.0)	−26.2 (−15.2)	−26.2 (−15.2)
Average precipitation mm (inches)	8.2 (0.32)	10.6 (0.42)	22.3 (0.88)	35.5 (1.40)	53.3 (2.10)	72.0 (2.83)	105.8 (4.17)	113.0 (4.45)	91.3 (3.59)	49.0 (1.93)	17.5 (0.69)	4.8 (0.19)	583.3 (22.97)
Average precipitation days (≥ 0.1 mm)	5.0	5.3	6.6	7.2	9.9	10.0	11.2	12.2	12.3	10.2	5.8	3.7	99.4
Average snowy days	6.4	6.5	4.2	0.8	0	0	0	0	0	0.6	3.4	4.9	26.8
Average relative humidity (%)	60	60	58	58	62	66	74	80	81	79	71	62	68
Mean monthly sunshine hours	176.0	158.6	181.4	204.9	219.3	211.6	208.1	185.7	135.3	140.5	162.7	180.4	2,164.5
Percentage possible sunshine	56	51	49	52	50	49	48	45	37	41	53	60	49
Source: China Meteorological Administration

== Transport ==
- China National Highway 312
