= Xianyang =

Xianyang 咸阳市
- Prefecture-level city
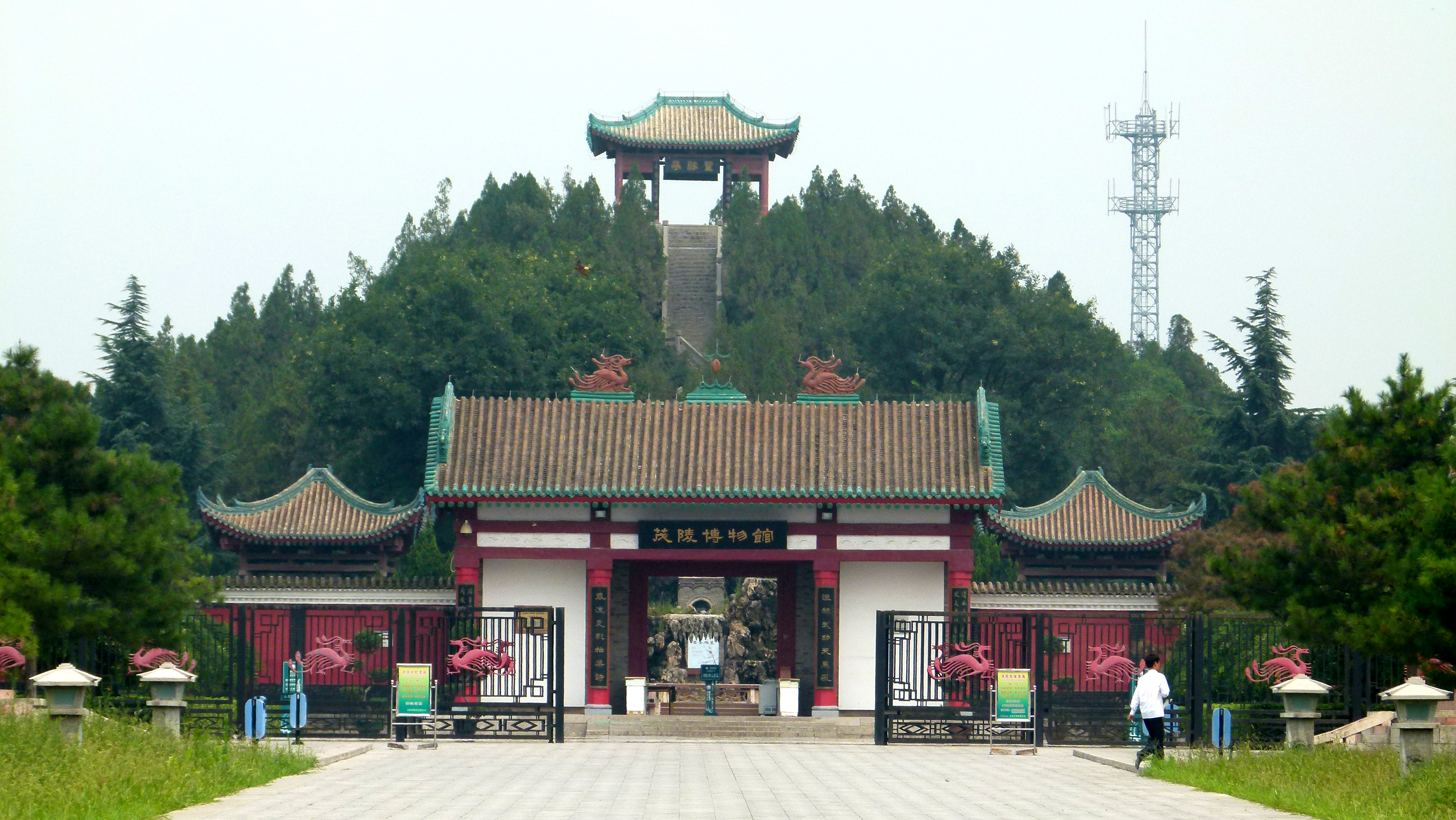
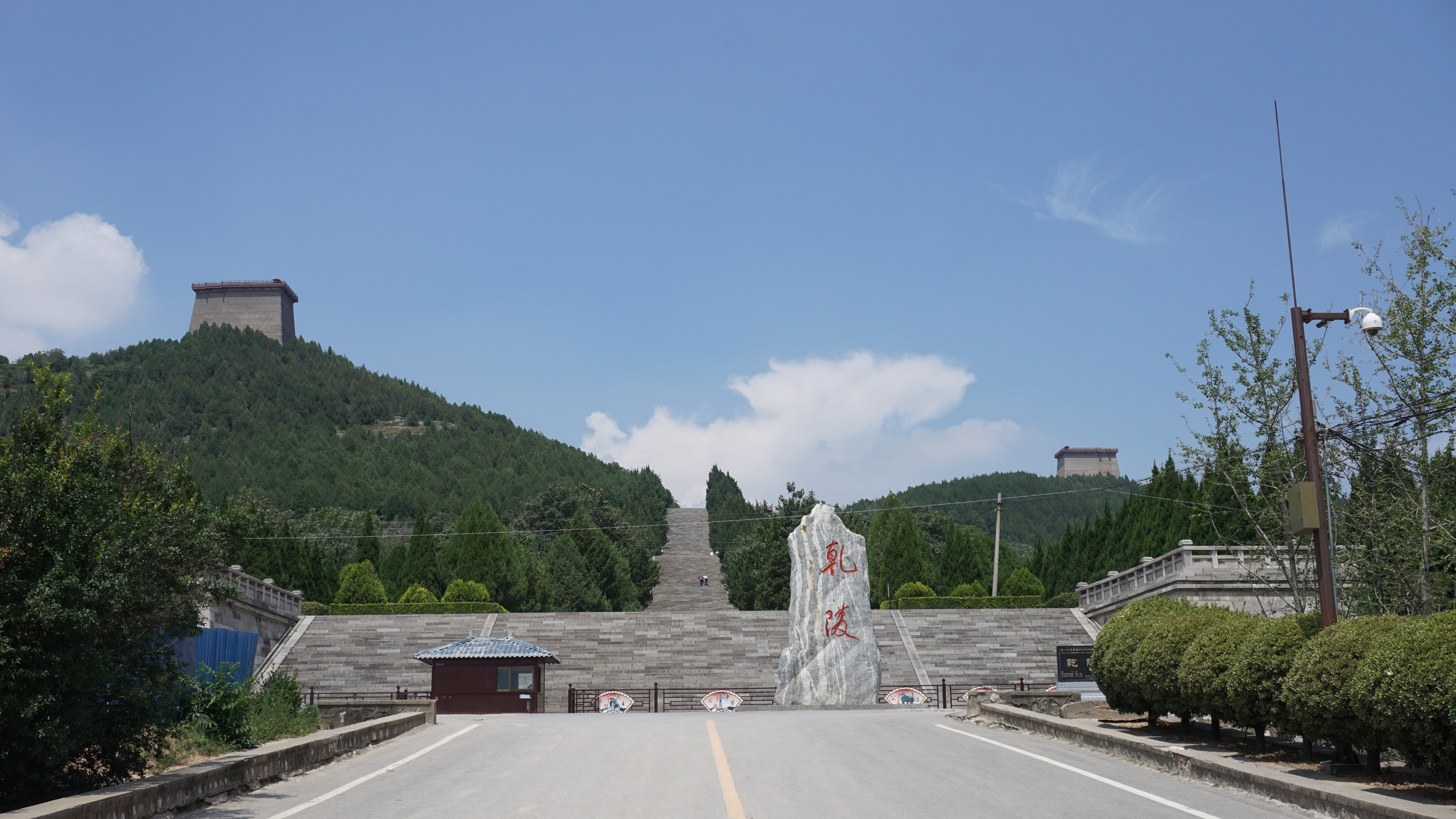
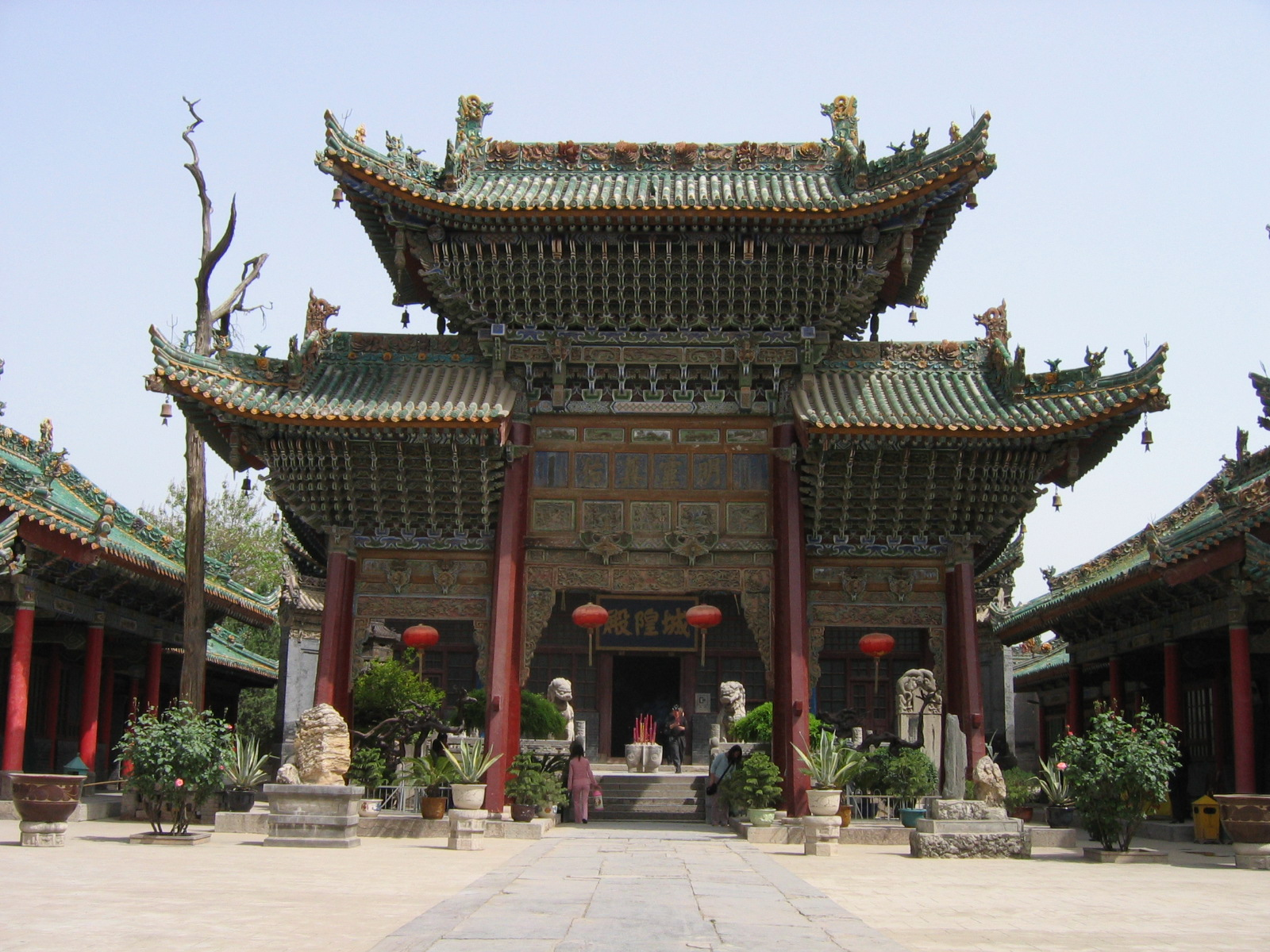
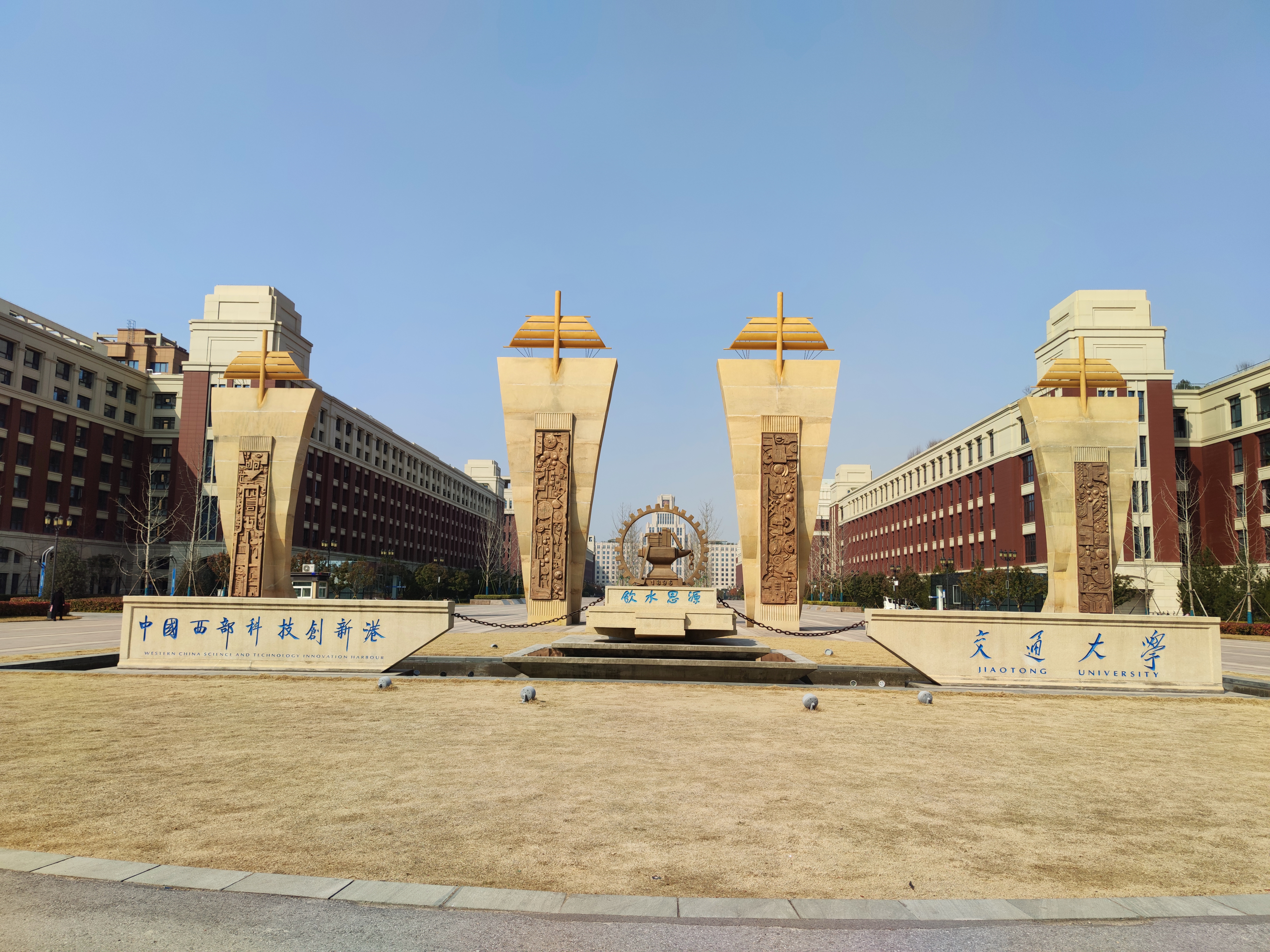
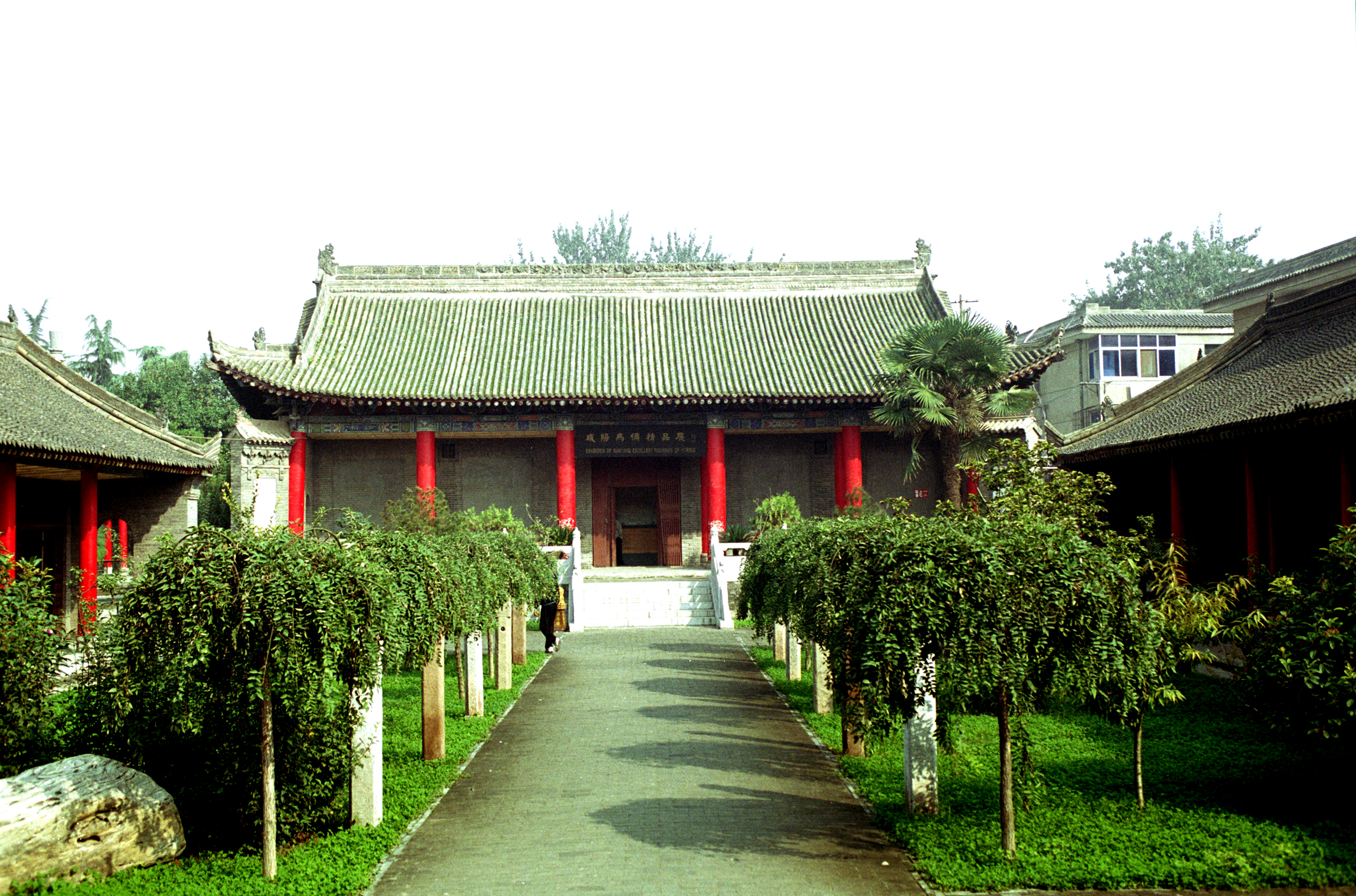
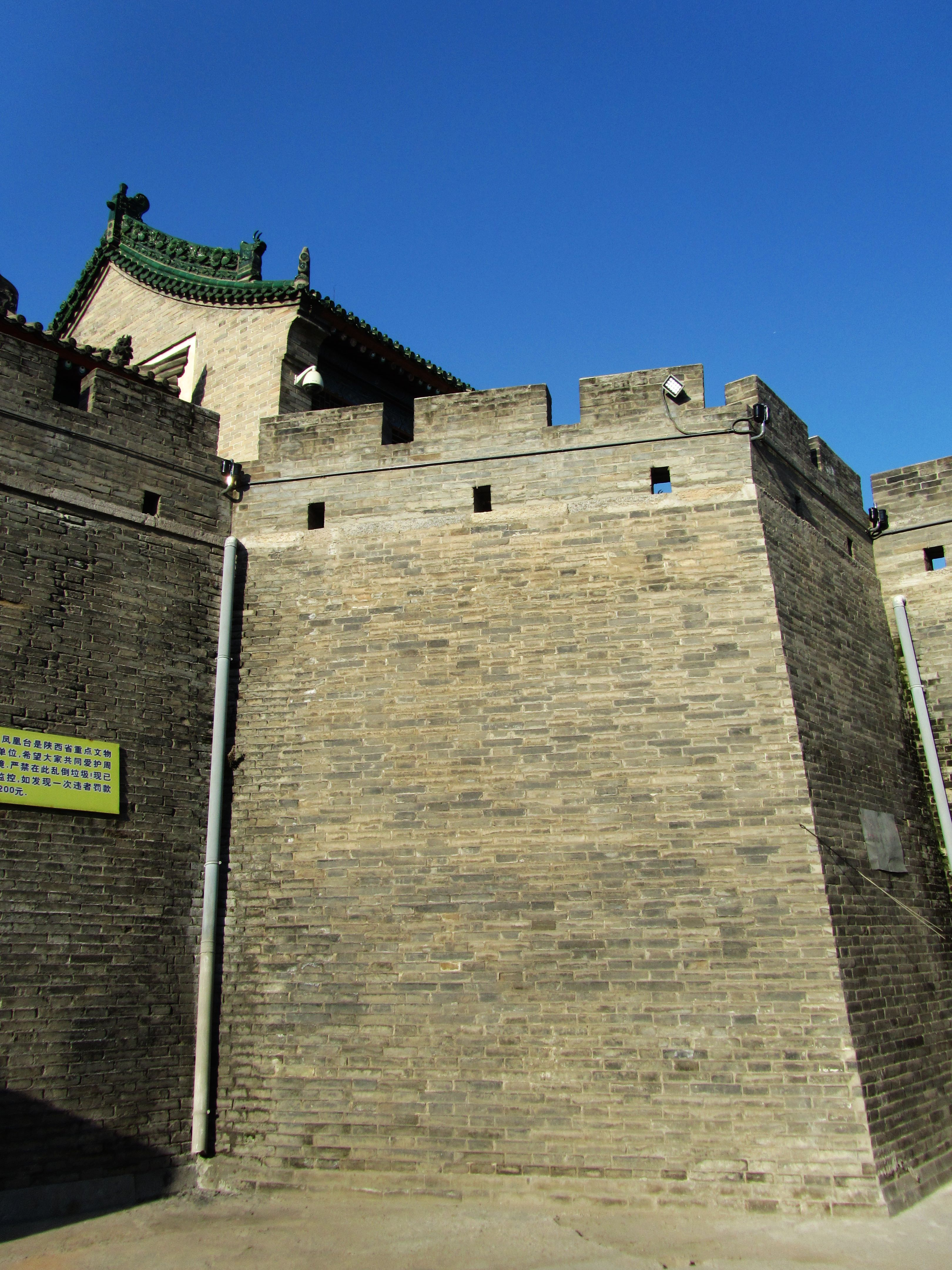
- Maoling Mausoleum Qianling Mausoleum Chenghuang Temple Iharbour Campus of Xi'an Jiaotong University Xianyang Museum Fenghuangtai

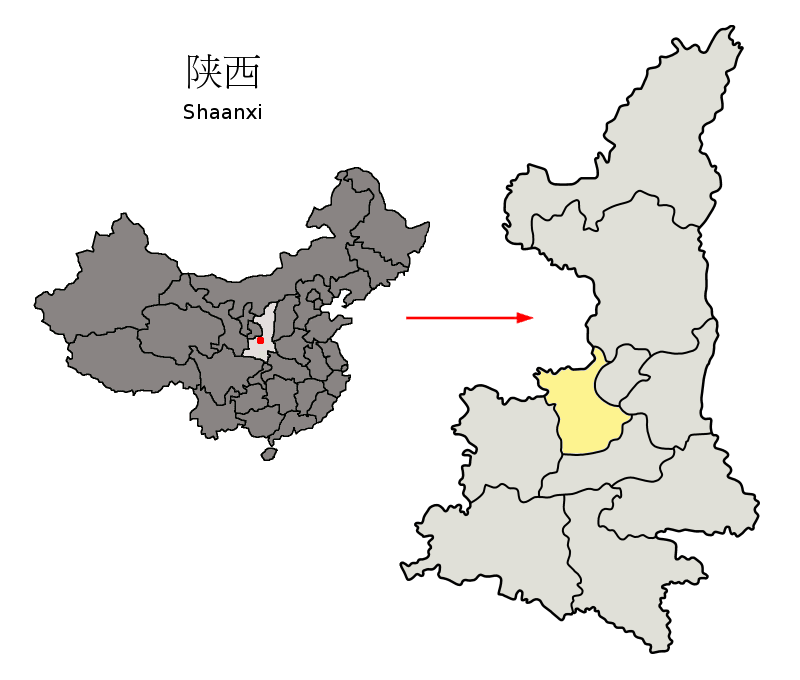
- Location of Xianyang Prefecture within Shaanxi
- Coordinates (Xianyang municipal government): 34°19′48″N 108°42′32″E
- Country: People's Republic of China
- Province: Shaanxi
- Municipal seat: Qindu District

Area
  - Prefecture-level city: 10,213 km^{2} (3,943 sq mi)
  - Urban: 523 km^{2} (202 sq mi)

Population (2010)
  - Prefecture-level city: 5,096,001
  - Density: 498.97/km^{2} (1,292.3/sq mi)
  - Urban: 945,420
  - Urban density: 1,810/km^{2} (4,680/sq mi)
  - Metro: Xian

GDP
  - Prefecture-level city: CN¥ 215 billion US$ 34.6 billion
  - Per capita: CN¥ 43,365; US$6,963
- Time zone: UTC+8 (China Standard)
- ISO 3166 code: CN-SN-04
- Website: www.xianyang.gov.cn

Xianyang
- "Xianyang" in Simplified (top) and Traditional (bottom) Chinese characters
- Simplified Chinese: 咸阳
- Traditional Chinese: 咸陽
- Postal: Sienyang
Transcriptions
Standard Mandarin
- Hanyu Pinyin: Xiányáng
- Wade–Giles: Hsien^{2}-yang^{2}
- IPA: [ɕjɛ̌n.jǎŋ]

Xianyang (Chinese: 咸阳; pinyin: Xiányáng) is a prefecture-level city in central Shaanxi province, situated on the Wei River a few kilometers upstream (west) from the provincial capital of Xi'an. The old Xianyang city was once the capital of the Qin dynasty and thus the first imperial capital of China. It is now integrated into the Greater Xi'an Metropolitan Area, one of the main megalopolises in northwestern China, with more than 7.17 million inhabitants. Its built-up area, consisting of 2 urban districts (Qindu and Weicheng), had 945,420 inhabitants at the 2010 census. It has a total area of 10,213 square kilometers (3,943 mi^{2}).

Xianyang is the seat of the Xi'an Xianyang International Airport, the main airport serving Xi'an and the largest airport in Northwest China, and one of the 40 busiest airports in the world.

Xianyang is one of the top 200 cities in the world by scientific research outputs, as tracked by the Nature Index. It is home to the main campus of Northwest A&F University (NWAFU), one of the world's top universities in agriculture science related fields, and a member of "Project 985" club which is an organization of 39 reputable universities in China.

== History ==
=== Qin dynasty ===
Xianyang was among the capital city's environs during the Western Zhou dynasty, and was made the capital of the state of Qin in 350 BC during the Warring States period before becoming the capital of China during the short-lived Qin dynasty. Because the city lay south of the Jiuzong Mountains and north of the Wei River – both sunlight-rich (yang) orientations – it was named "Xianyang", meaning "fully yang".

Under Duke Xiao of Qin's reign, minister Shang Yang designed Xianyang and in 350 BC organized the relocation of Qin's administration from the old capital Yueyang to the new city, which was then the capital for over 140 years. It was located in the modern day Shaanxi province on the northern bank of the Wei River, on the opposite side of which Liu Bang would later build the Han dynasty capital of Chang'an once he became emperor.

In 221 BC, Qin Shi Huang eliminated all six other warring states to establish the first centralized empire in Chinese history. Xianyang became the center of politics, economy and culture of the Qin empire. Noble families were compelled to move into Xianyang, and the realm's weapons were gathered in the city to be melted and cast into twelve towering statues. The Emperor had a lavish mausoleum built near the capital, complete with his Terracotta Army. This and other large undertakings diverted enormous levels of manpower and resources away from agriculture. Coupled with the state's repressive measures on the population, these factors eventually led to the fall of the Qin dynasty and with it the original city of Xianyang.

Qin Shi Huang expanded Xianyang beyond the walls. Then he built replicas of the palaces of all the conquered states along the Wei River. In 220 BC, he built Xin Palace (新城; Xīnchéng) and later renamed it Wei Palace (渭城; Wèichéng), named after the Wei River. He continued with the theme of earth as the mirror of heaven building a network of 300 palaces in the Wei valley connected by elevated roads. In 212 BC, he built the Epang Palace (阿房宮; Ēpánggōng).

Shortly after the First Emperor's death in 210 BC revolts erupted. At the beginning of December 207 BC, the last Qin emperor Ziying surrendered to rebel leader Liu Bang, who entered Xianyang peacefully without harming the locals. However, Liu Bang was forced to hand the city over to another more ruthless rebel leader, Xiang Yu, whose army greatly outnumbered Liu Bang's. Xiang Yu then killed Ziying and burned Xianyang in 206 BC, destroying the sole surviving copies of several banned books that were kept in the royal library.

In 202 BC, after defeating Xiang Yu in Battle of Gaixia and ending the Chu-Han contention, Liu Bang was crowned the emperor of the newly established Han dynasty, and he built a new capital across the Wei River merely miles from the ruins of old Xianyang and named this new city Chang'an.

=== Later History ===
During the Han dynasty, parts of Xianyang south of the Wei River were incorporated into the new imperial capital Chang'an, while the area north of the river became the Weicheng (渭城) County. Liu Bang, the Emperor Gaozu of Han, chose the high plain in Xianyang to be the site of his own mausoleum, and many of his successors followed suit. In order to secure the imperial mausoleums, the Han dynasty established five "mausoleum towns" (陵邑) and resettled many rich and prominent families of the empire there. Over time, Wuling (五陵, "Five Mausoleums") became a name that was associated with the empire's elite for many centuries.

Weicheng was home to the first relay station out of the capital Chang'an on the road to the western frontiers during the Tang era. In Tang literature, Weicheng was associated with parting. It was the setting of many poems, most notably Wang Wei's "A Song at Weicheng", a classic of farewell poetry.

Present-day Xianyang was established in 1371, during the early Ming dynasty.

=== Modern History ===
After the founding of the People's Republic, Xianyang Subregion was established, administering six counties: Xianyang, Xingping, Wugong, Chang’an, Huxian, and Zhouzhi. In August 1950, after the establishment of Shaanxi Provincial Government, Xianyang Subregion governed 13 counties: Xianyang, Sanyuan, Jingyang, Chunhua, Xunyi, Liquan, Xingping, Zhouzhi, Huxian, Yaoxian, Tongchuan, Fuping, and Gaoling. In August 1952, Xianyang was granted county-level city status. On 8 January 1953, the Subregion was abolished; Xianyang City, Xianyang County, Huxian, and Tongchuan came under provincial direct control, while suburban counties were reassigned to Weinan and Baoji administrative regions. In August 1958, Xianyang city and county merged into a new county-level city. On 8 October 1961, the Subregion was re-established, administering the county-level Xianyang City plus 13 counties. On 8 June 1966, Xianyang city was placed under Xi’an's jurisdiction until August 1971, when it returned to Xianyang Subregion.

On 5 October 1983, the State Council approved the transformation of Xianyang Subregion into a prefecture-level Xianyang City, converting the former county-level Xianyang City into Qindu District. Zhouzhi, Huxian, and Gaoling were transferred to Xi’an, while Wugong County and Yangling District (formerly part of Baoji) were placed under the new prefecture-level Xianyang City. In May 1984, county-level cities under Xianyang Subregion were renamed as administrative districts.

On 16 September 2006, following the merger of Xi’an and Xianyang local telephone networks, Xianyang's area code 0910 was changed to 029. On 8 July 2007, Yangling District was brought under the jurisdiction of the national Yangling Agricultural High‑Tech Demonstration Zone, although it remained de facto part of Xianyang. On 8 January 2017, fifteen townships (pop. ~605,000) from the four districts of Qindu, Weicheng, Jingyang, and Xingping were administratively reassigned to Xi’an. On 8 May 2018, with State Council approval, Bin County was dissolved and reconstituted as the county-level Binzhou City, directly administered by Shaanxi Province and managed by Xianyang.

=== Archeology ===
From the end of the 1950s until the middle of the 1990s, archeologists discovered and excavated numerous Qin era sites in Xianyang, including palaces, workshops and tombs.

== Administrative divisions ==
Map
Name	Hanzi	Hanyu Pinyin	Population (2004 est.)	Area (km^{2})	Density (/km^{2})
Weicheng District	渭城区	Wèichéng Qū	400,000	272	1,471
Yangling District	杨陵区	Yánglíng Qū	140,000	94	1,489
Qindu District	秦都区	Qíndū Qū	450,000	251	1,793
Xingping city	兴平市	Xīngpíng Shì	560,000	496	1,129
Binzhou city	彬州市	Bīnzhōu Shì	330,000	1,202	275
Sanyuan County	三原县	Sānyuán Xiàn	400,000	569	703
Jingyang County	泾阳县	Jīngyáng Xiàn	500,000	792	631
Qian County	乾县	Qián Xiàn	560,000	994	563
Liquan County	礼泉县	Lǐquán Xiàn	460,000	1,017	452
Yongshou County	永寿县	Yǒngshòu Xiàn	190,000	869	219
Changwu County	长武县	Chángwǔ Xiàn	170,000	583	292
Xunyi County	旬邑县	Xúnyì Xiàn	270,000	1,697	159
Chunhua County	淳化县	Chúnhuà Xiàn	200,000	965	207
Wugong County	武功县	Wǔgōng Xiàn	410,000	392	1,046

The Chinese Bureau of Statistics lists the urban population of the city at 316,641 in the 1990 Census, rising to 814,625 on the 2000 Census, and to 835,648 in the 2010 Census.

== Climate ==
Xianyang sits in the central part of the Guanzhong Basin in Shaanxi Province. The terrain steps down from north to south, with distinct elevation gradients and clear topographic boundaries. The Loess Plateau and adjacent plains dominate the landscape. The highest point within the city is Shimen Mountain in the northeast, reaching 1,826 m, while the lowest point lies at the Qīnghé exit in Dacheng Town, Sanyuan County, at 366 m.

The northern part is part of the southern edge of the Loess Plateau, generally delineated by the Jing River. The southwest features loess hills and ravines, while the northeast consists of eroded loess gullies and low-to-mid hills. The central and southern parts form the Wei River Plain, a flat and largely erosion-free segment of the Guanzhong Plain. This basin is further divided into the Jing–Wei alluvial plain and the loess plateau, arranged in descending terraces from north to south.

Surface water is primarily composed of river runoff and groundwater. All rivers belong to the Wei River tributary of the Yellow River. The main tributaries within Xianyang are the Qishui, Xinhe, Fenghe, Jinghe, and Shichuan rivers, with the Jinghe being the most significant, forming two major drainage systems: Jinghe and Wei River. Groundwater is richer in the south and poorer in the north. Prolonged drought and over-extraction of groundwater have led to the drying of some rivers and ponds, and a continuous decline in groundwater levels. Although there is substantial transit water, its utilization remains challenging due to uneven distribution of surface and groundwater.

Climate data for Xianyang (Qindu District) (1991–2020 normals, extremes 1981–2010)
Month	Jan	Feb	Mar	Apr	May	Jun	Jul	Aug	Sep	Oct	Nov	Dec	Year
Record high °C (°F)	16.0 (60.8)	23.0 (73.4)	30.6 (87.1)	34.6 (94.3)	37.8 (100.0)	41.7 (107.1)	39.6 (103.3)	39.2 (102.6)	36.8 (98.2)	31.1 (88.0)	24.4 (75.9)	22.4 (72.3)	41.7 (107.1)
Mean daily maximum °C (°F)	4.7 (40.5)	9.1 (48.4)	15.1 (59.2)	21.5 (70.7)	26.4 (79.5)	31.5 (88.7)	32.5 (90.5)	30.2 (86.4)	25.1 (77.2)	19.1 (66.4)	12.3 (54.1)	6.3 (43.3)	19.5 (67.1)
Daily mean °C (°F)	−0.9 (30.4)	2.6 (36.7)	7.7 (45.9)	14.1 (57.4)	19.3 (66.7)	24.5 (76.1)	26.3 (79.3)	24.4 (75.9)	19.6 (67.3)	13.3 (55.9)	6.0 (42.8)	0.5 (32.9)	13.1 (55.6)
Mean daily minimum °C (°F)	−5.1 (22.8)	−1.6 (29.1)	3.4 (38.1)	8.6 (47.5)	13.4 (56.1)	18.8 (65.8)	22.1 (71.8)	20.9 (69.6)	15.9 (60.6)	9.2 (48.6)	1.9 (35.4)	−3.7 (25.3)	8.7 (47.6)
Record low °C (°F)	−16.3 (2.7)	−12.4 (9.7)	−8.5 (16.7)	−2.1 (28.2)	2.4 (36.3)	8.7 (47.7)	14.7 (58.5)	12.0 (53.6)	5.0 (41.0)	−4.4 (24.1)	−12.3 (9.9)	−18.6 (−1.5)	−18.6 (−1.5)
Average precipitation mm (inches)	6.2 (0.24)	8.8 (0.35)	22.1 (0.87)	34.6 (1.36)	49.8 (1.96)	60.5 (2.38)	82.8 (3.26)	84.6 (3.33)	89.4 (3.52)	54.0 (2.13)	21.9 (0.86)	4.5 (0.18)	519.2 (20.44)
Average precipitation days (≥ 0.1 mm)	3.5	3.9	5.9	7.0	8.8	8.0	9.7	9.4	11.4	9.6	5.7	2.8	85.7
Average snowy days	4.3	3.1	1.3	0.1	0	0	0	0	0	0	1.2	2.6	12.6
Average relative humidity (%)	64	63	62	66	65	61	69	75	78	78	74	66	68
Mean monthly sunshine hours	134.4	132.0	169.8	194.4	211.3	211.0	223.2	200.8	143.1	138.0	135.5	141.0	2,034.5
Percentage possible sunshine	43	42	46	49	49	49	51	49	39	40	44	46	46
Source: China Meteorological Administration

== Education ==
Xianyang is one of the top 200 cities in the world by scientific research outputs, as tracked by the Nature Index. Xianyang is home to the main campus of Northwest A&F University (NWAFU), one of the world's top universities in agriculture science related-fields, and a member of "Project 985" club which is an organization of 39 reputable universities in China.

National

- Northwest A&F University (NWAFU)
- Shaanxi University of Science & Technology

Public

- Shaanxi University of Chinese Medicine
- Xianyang Normal University

== Transport ==
- China National Highway 312
- Xi'an Xianyang International Airport
- Xianyang West railway station
- Xi'an Metro Line 1

== Culture and tourism ==
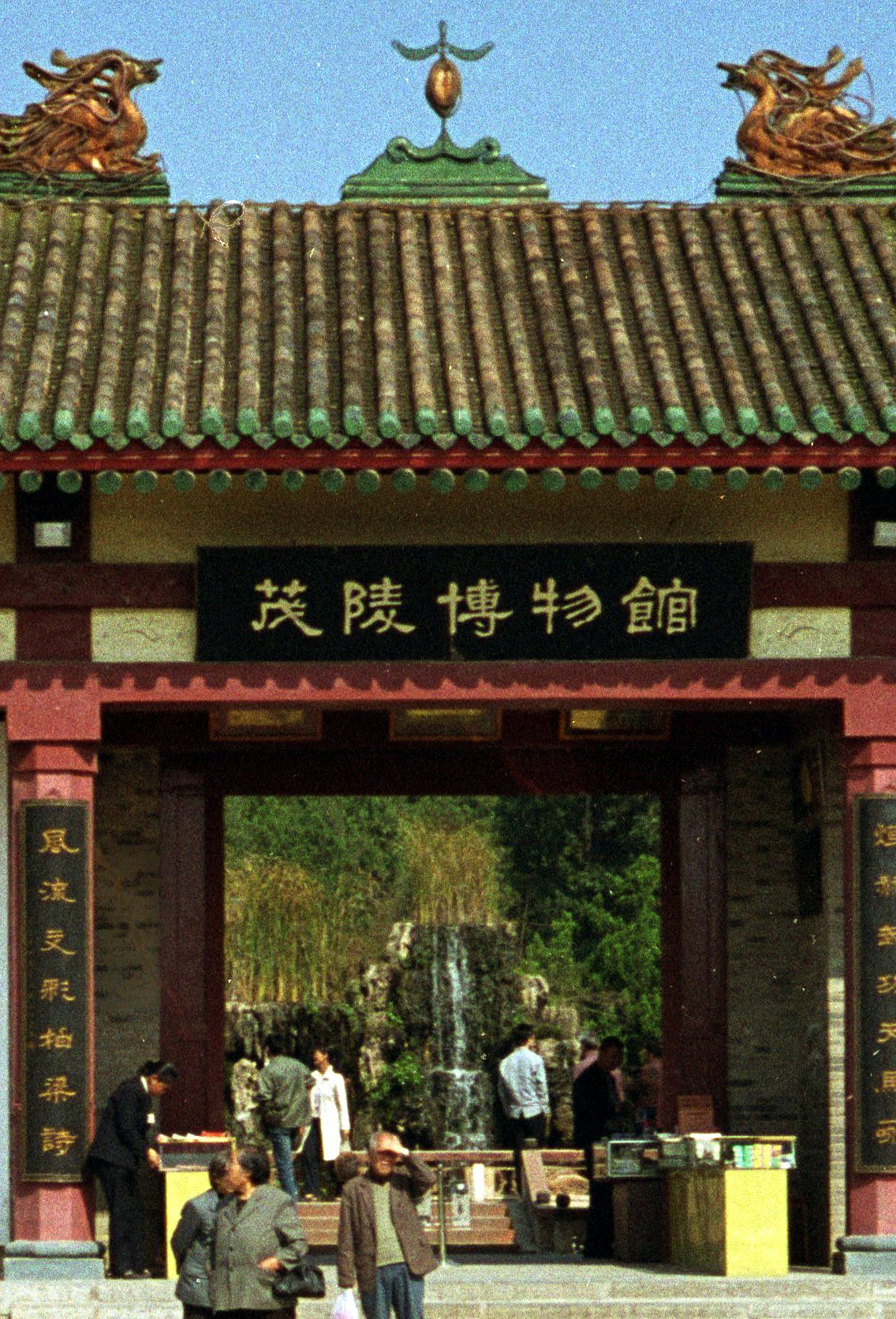
Maoling Museum

Xianyang was the capital of the Qin dynasty, the first unified feudal empire in Chinese history, and it also served as a key imperial region for over ten other dynasties including the Han and Tang. It was the first stop on the world-renowned ancient Silk Road. This long history has left the city with an abundance of cultural relics and historic sites. Numerous ancient ruins and tombs are widely distributed across the city, with a particularly high concentration. Representative ancient buildings include the Tai Pagoda in Xunyi, the Kaiyuan Pagoda in Binzhou, the Chongwen Pagoda in Jingyang, and the Chenghuang Temple in Sanyuan. The city's significant stone carvings include the grottoes of Binzhou's Giant Buddha Temple.

According to official statistics, Xianyang has 5,313 registered cultural heritage sites, including 1,037 ancient ruins, 1,135 ancient tombs, and 247 ancient architectural structures.

Xianyang is considered a major cultural city in Shaanxi and China. It is often referred to as a treasury of Zhou, Qin, Han, and Tang cultural relics. The city is home to one UNESCO World Heritage Site, two National Archaeological Parks, one first-grade museum (the Xianyang Museum), and one National Forest Park. There are nine key ancient ruins such as the site of the ancient State of Tai, the Xianyang Palace Site, and the Zhengguo Canal. Additionally, there are 21 imperial mausoleums from the Han and Tang dynasties, along with sites like the Thousand Buddha Pagoda, the Terracotta Army of the Qin and Han periods, Mao Mausoleum, and the Yang Mausoleum of Han.

The city is the birthplace of the Ban family: Ban Gu, a historian of the Eastern Han dynasty; Ban Chao, who opened the Western Regions; and Ban Zhao, the earliest known female Chinese historian. They were children of Ban Biao from modern-day Xianyang.

Within the urban core lies the ruins of the Ming-Qing walled old city, accessible through Beiping Street. This area houses several Major Historical and Cultural Sites Protected at the National Level in China, including the Xianyang Confucian Temple, Anguo Temple, and Shengmu Palace, as well as the only surviving section of Xianyang's Ming city wall—Phoenix Terrace (凤凰台).

Xianyang Lake is the largest artificial lake in Northwest China. Along its shores lies the historic ferry site of Xianyang, which was one of the Eight Scenic Spots of Guanzhong. The lake stretches from Gudong Park in Weicheng District in the east to Xiantong South Road in Qindu District in the west, southward to the Xianyang Lake South Garden Square, and connects with the Century Avenue of the Xi'an-Xianyang New Area. The northern edge reaches Unity Square (统一广场), the city's largest civic plaza, which served as the starting point for the Olympic torch relay in Xianyang during the 2008 Summer Olympics.

== Religion ==
Before the Ming dynasty, most of the Han population in the region practiced Buddhism or Taoism, while the Hui people adhered to Islam. Catholicism was introduced into the area in the late Ming and early Qing dynasties. Following the First Opium War in 1840, both Catholicism and Protestantism spread across the counties of Xianyang, eventually becoming two of the most widely followed and influential religions in the area.

During the Cultural Revolution of 1966–1976, all religious activities in the region were forcibly suspended. After the Third Plenary Session of the 11th Central Committee of the Chinese Communist Party in 1978, religious properties such as churches and temples were returned to religious organizations, and religious activities were gradually restored.

== Language ==
Most dialects spoken in Xianyang belong to the Central Plains Mandarin (Zhongyuan Mandarin), a subcategory of Northern Mandarin, particularly the Guanzhong subgroup. However, certain areas—such as Wuqian village in Yangling District, Youfeng village in Wugong County, Yongle in Bin County, as well as Ju family and Lu family villages in Changwu—are considered part of the Qinlong subgroup of Central Plains Mandarin.

Preceded by Luoyang then —	Capital of China; 221–206 BC	Succeeded by — then Luoyang
