= Yanliang railway station =

Railway station in Xi'an, Shaanxi, China

Coordinates: 34.669594°N 109.223778°E

Yanliang 阎良
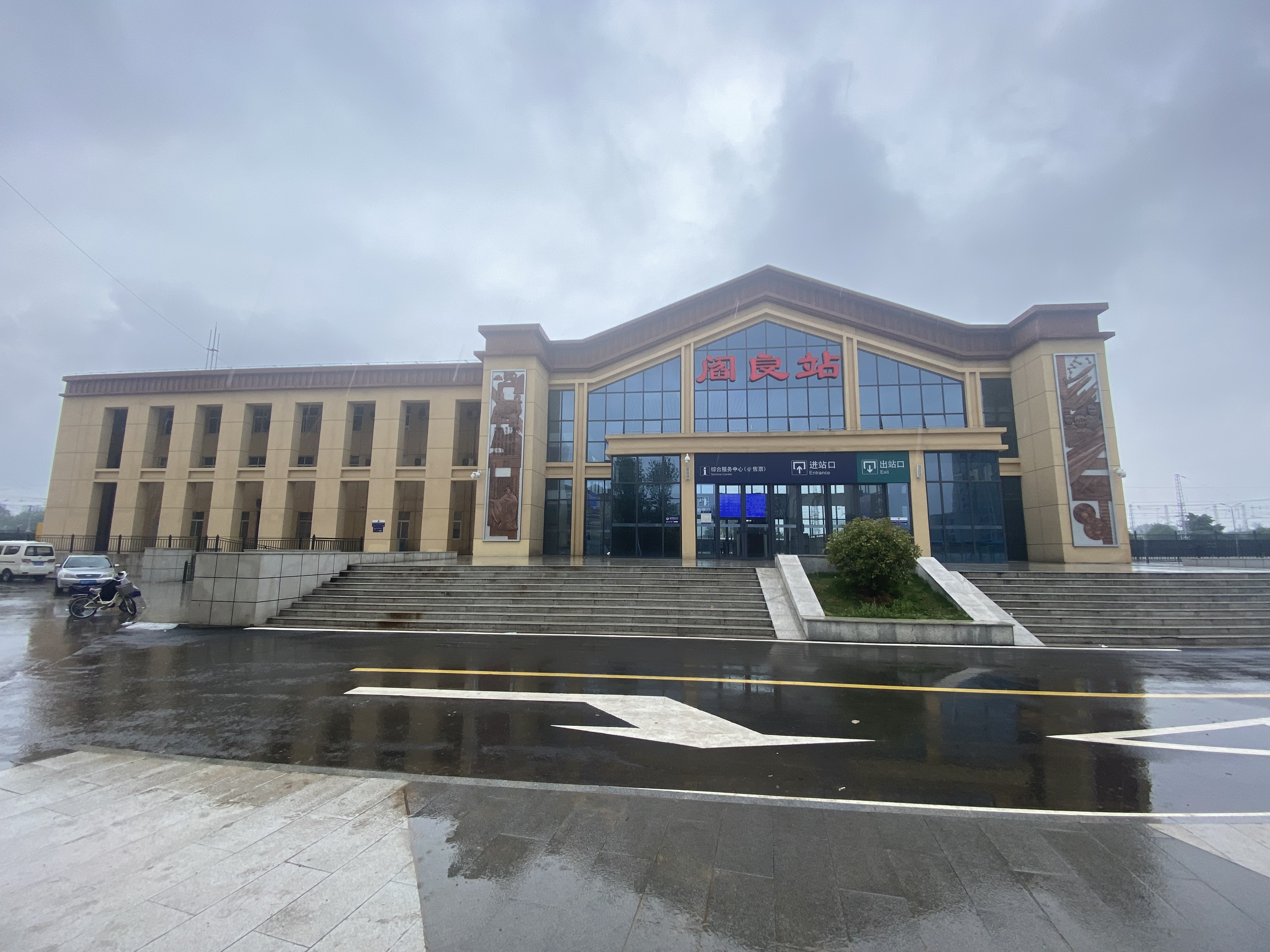
- Station building, 2023

General information
- Location: 173 Shengli Street, Yanliang District, Xi'an, Shaanxi, China
- Operated by: China Railway Xi'an Group
- Lines: Houma–Xi'an railway; Xianyang–Tongchuan railway
- Platforms: 2
- Tracks: 8

Other information
- Station code: 40019 (TMIS code); YNY (telegraph code); YLI (Pinyin code)

History
- Opened: 1941
- Rebuilt: 2021
Location

Yanliang railway station is a railway station located in Yanliang District, Xi'an, Shaanxi, China, serving the Xianyang–Tongchuan railway and the Houma–Xi'an railway. First opened in 1941, the station building was rebuilt twice, first in 1972 and then in 2022. The station is managed by China Railway Xi'an Group.

== History ==
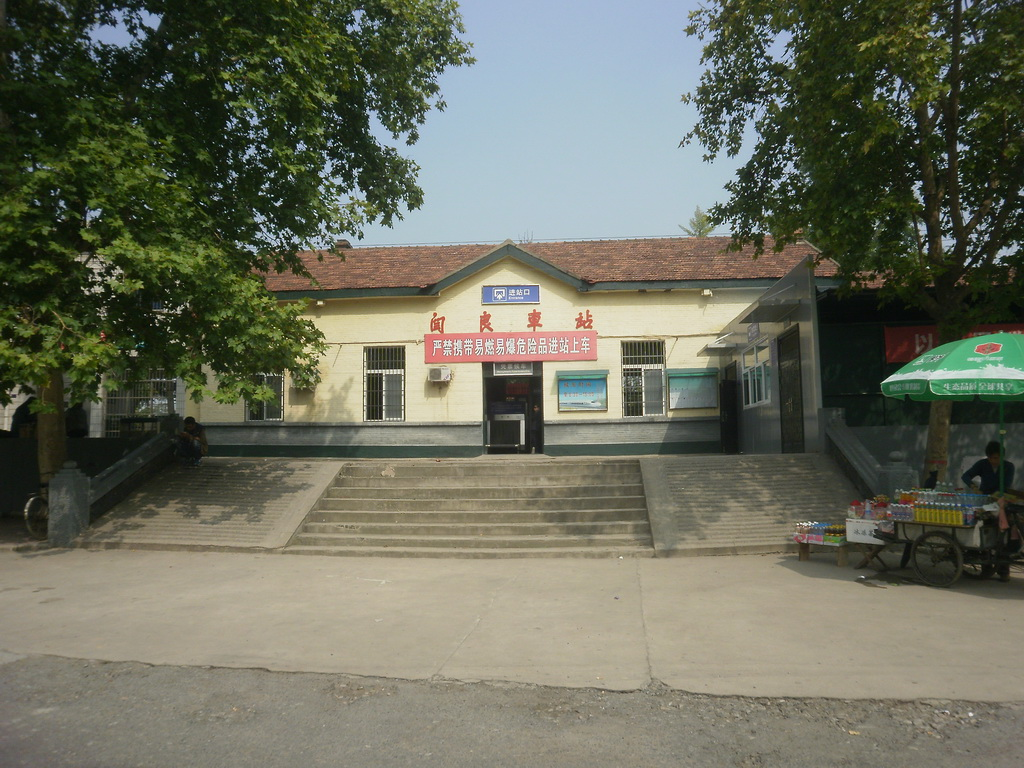
The old station building built in 1972, photographed in 2014

Yanliang railway station opened in November 1941 when the Xianyang–Tongchuan railway started operations. The station covers an area of 150 acres (730,000 sq yd), with platforms of more than 100 meters long and 3 tracks for both passenger and freight operations.

In 1972, a new station building was constructed at the station, taking up 180 acres (870,000 sq yd) of land.

The station has been planned to become part of the Houma–Xi'an railway since 1958. The section of the line between Hancheng and Yanliang was completed in 1977, and opened the following year. In 1980, the line, along with Yanliang station itself, was allocated under the management of China Railway Xi'an Group.

Starting in April 2021, Yanliang station temporarily suspended passenger operations to allow for the electrification of the Xianyang–Tongchuan railway line. The conversion was completed in July the following year. The station building was simultaneously demolished and rebuilt.

== Station layout ==
There are 8 tracks in Yanliang station, including 6 arrival and departure tracks of lengths ranging between 860–896 metres (2,822–2,940 ft), 1 rescue train storage track of length 309 metres (1,014 ft) and 1 freight track of length 540 metres (1,770 ft).
