= Da liang zao =

Highest rank in Qin's bureaucracy

Da Liang Zao (Chinese: 大良造), the highest rank of Qin's bureaucracy, had supreme political and military power (equivalent to Prime Minister). The term began being used in Duke Xiao of Qin's era after Shang Yang was elevated from Zuo Shuzhang (Chinese: 左庶长) to Da Liang Zao. The Qin dynasty had 20 ranks in its military, and Da Liang Zao was the 16th in that system.

== Overview ==
It is a title of nobility as well. Also known as Da Shang Zao (大上造). The function of Da Liang Zao was replaced by "Xiang Guo" after King Huiwen of Qin, left it as a name of nobility only. It was inherited by Han dynasty.
