= Yueyang (Qin) =

Yueyang City Ruins
- 栎阳城遗址 (Chinese)
- Interactive map of Yueyang City Ruins
- 34.6735°N 109.27886°E
- Type: Settlement; ancient capital
- Location: Yanliang District, Xi'an, Shaanxi

History
- Built: Warring States era

Yueyang (simplified Chinese: 栎阳; traditional Chinese: 櫟陽) was a capital of the Qin state in 4th century BC, during the Warring States era of China. It is now known as Yueyang City Ruins (simplified Chinese: 栎阳城遗址; traditional Chinese: 櫟陽城遺址) and located in Yanliang District, Xi'an, Shaanxi province.

== History ==
Yueyang was the capital of Qin during Duke Xian and Duke Xiao's rule. During this period, Shang Yang's reforms transformed Qin into a prominent power in ancient China.

During the Chu–Han contention period of late 3rd century BC, Yueyang served as the capital of Sima Xin, King of Sai. The city was also briefly the seat of power of Liu Bang, the future Emperor Gaozu of Han.

== Site ==
Archaeologists have located the ruins of Yueyang in Yanliang District, Xi'an, Shaanxi province. The Warring States era city was identified in 2016. A 440m long section of the north city wall was discovered. There were also a square encircled by rammed earth walls measuring 100m long on each side, and several major buildings, which were believed to be palaces.

Two walled cities dating back to the Qin–Han period (after 221 BC) was discovered in 1980 and 2013, respectively. The second city was 3100m long from east to west and 3800m from south to north. Archeological evidence indicated that the city had been abandoned by the Xin dynasty (9 – 23 AD).
