= Duke Jian of Qin =

Ruler of Qin, China from 414 to 400 BC

Duke Jian of Qin 秦簡公

Ruler of Qin
- Reign: 414–400 BC
- Predecessor: Duke Ling of Qin
- Successor: Duke Hui II of Qin
- Born: 428 BC
- Died: 400 BC (aged 28)
Names
- Ying Daozi (嬴悼子)
Posthumous name
- Duke Jian (簡公)
- House: Ying
- Dynasty: Qin
- Father: Duke Huai of Qin

Duke Jian of Qin (Chinese: 秦簡公; pinyin: Qín Jiǎn Gōng; 428–400 BC), personal name Ying Daozi, was a duke of the state of Qin during the Eastern Zhou dynasty, reigning from 414 to 400 BC.

Duke Jian was the younger son of Duke Huai and the uncle of his predecessor Duke Ling. When Duke Ling died in 415 BC, the throne was passed to Duke Jian instead of Duke Ling's son, the later Duke Xian.

During Duke Jian's reign, the Qin state was defeated several times by the Wei state, then a major power of the Warring States period.

Duke Jian reigned for 15 years and died in 400 BC at the age of 28. He was succeeded by his son, Duke Hui II.

Duke Jian of Qin House of Ying Born: 428 BC Died: 400 BC
Regnal titles
Preceded by Duke Ling of Qin	Duke of Qin; 414–400 BC	Succeeded by Duke Hui II of Qin
