= Duke Ling of Qin =

Ruler of Qin, China from 424 to 415 BC

Duke Ling of Qin 秦靈公

Ruler of Qin
- Reign: 424–415 BC
- Predecessor: Duke Huai of Qin
- Successor: Duke Jian of Qin
- Died: 415 BC
- Issue: Duke Xian of Qin
Posthumous name
- Duke Ling (靈公) or Duke Suling (肅靈公)
- House: Ying
- Dynasty: Qin
- Father: Ying Zhaozi (嬴昭子; son of Duke Huai)

Duke Ling of Qin (Chinese: 秦靈公; pinyin: Qín Líng Gōng; died 415 BC), personal name unknown, was a duke of the state of Qin during the Eastern Zhou dynasty, reigning from 424 to 415 BC.

Duke Ling's predecessor was his grandfather Duke Huai. In 425 BC Qin general Chao (鼌) and other ministers attacked and besieged Duke Huai, and Duke Huai committed suicide. As Duke Huai's son Crown Prince Zhaozi (昭子) died early, the ministers installed Duke Ling, Zhaozi's son, on the throne.

In 419 BC, the sixth year of Duke Ling's reign, Qin attacked the state of Wei at the city of Shaoliang (少梁, in present-day Hancheng, Shaanxi).

Duke Ling reigned for 10 years and died in 415 BC. However, the throne was passed to his uncle Duke Jian, son of Duke Huai and younger brother of Zhaozi. Duke Ling's own son Shixi, later known as Duke Xian, was exiled to Wei. Duke Xian would eventually ascend the throne nearly 30 years later, after Duke Jian's grandson Chuzi II was killed.

Duke Ling of Qin House of Ying Died: 415 BC
Regnal titles
Preceded by Duke Huai of Qin	Duke of Qin; 424–415 BC	Succeeded by Duke Jian of Qin
