= Canon of Laws =

407 BCE Chinese text by Li Kui

The Canon of Laws or Classic of Law (simplified Chinese: 法经; traditional Chinese: 法經; pinyin: Fǎ Jīng) is a lost legal code that has been attributed to Li Kui, a Legalist scholar and minister who lived in the State of Wei during the Warring States period of ancient China (475-220 BCE). This code has traditionally been dated to the early fourth century BCE. Still, a considerable amount of scholars now consider it to be a forgery from the fifth or sixth-century CE.

According to the traditional account, which first appeared in the monograph on law (Xingfa Zhi 刑法志) of the Book of Jin, the Canon of Laws was the earliest legal canon of ancient China and became the basis for all later legal works. It is said that Legalist reformer Shang Yang took it to the State of Qin where it became the basis of the law of the State of Qin (Chinese: 秦律; pinyin: Qīn Lü) and later, the law of the Qin dynasty.

Although the original text has been lost, according to later records the Canon of Laws comprised six chapters:

- Theft and robbery law (simplified Chinese: 盗法; traditional Chinese: 盜法; pinyin: Dào Fǎ)
- Treason law (simplified Chinese: 贼法; traditional Chinese: 賊法; pinyin: Zéi Fǎ)
- Prisoner or extent of justice law (Chinese: 囚法; pinyin: Qiú Fǎ or simplified Chinese: 网法; traditional Chinese: 網法; pinyin: Wǎng Fǎ)
- Law of arrest (Chinese: 捕法; pinyin: Bǔ Fǎ)
- Miscellaneous law (Chinese: 杂法; Chinese: 雜法; pinyin: Zá Fǎ)
- Law of possession (Chinese: 具法; pinyin: Jù Fǎ)

== Other references ==
- “History of the Chinese Legal System”, Pu Jian, Central Radio & TV University Press October 2006 ISBN 7-304-02441-0/D•209, Chapter four, second section.
