= Xianyang–Tongchuan railway =

Railway line in China

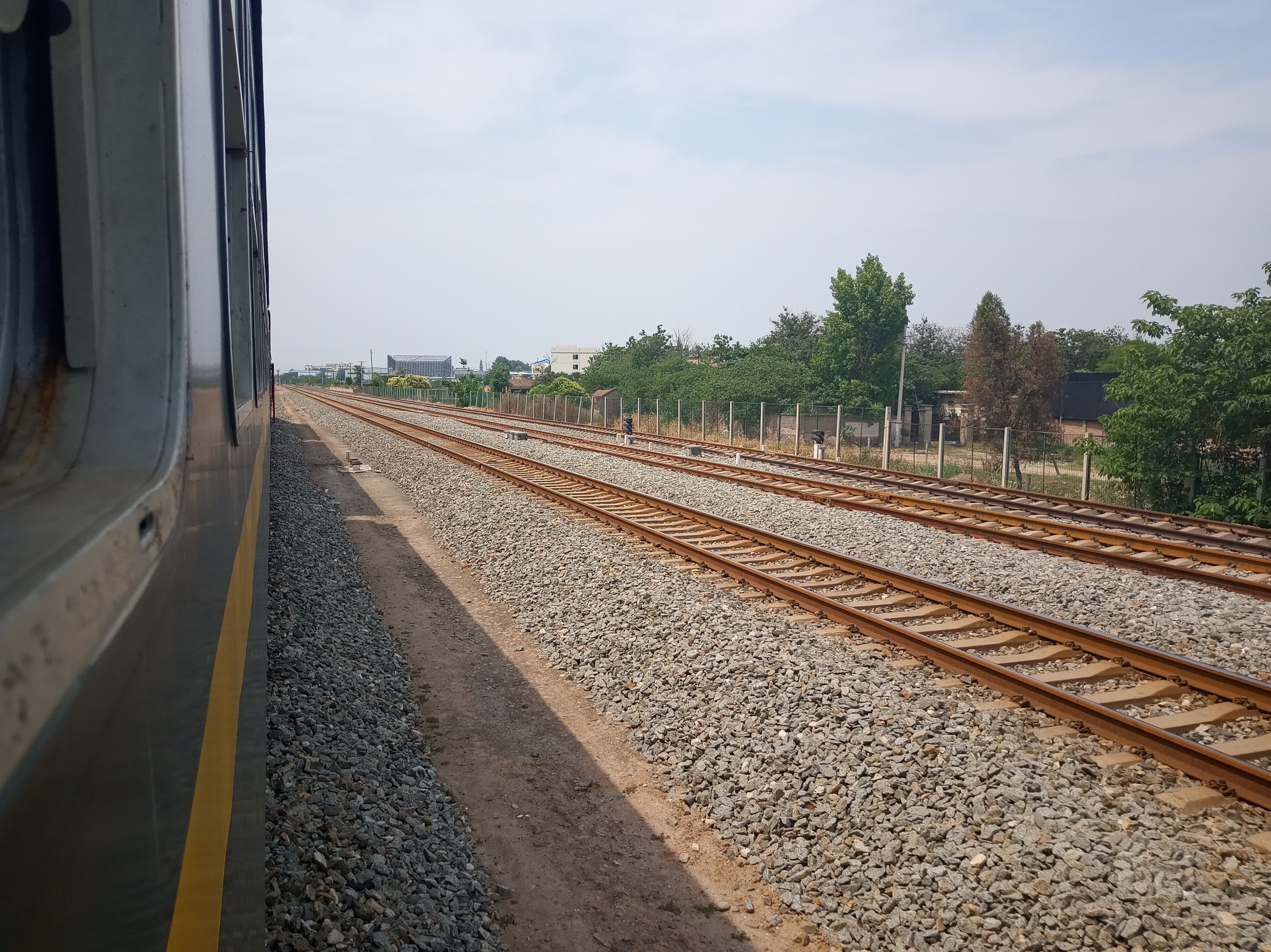
- The railway in 2019.

Overview
- Native name: 咸铜铁路
- Status: Operational
- Termini: Xianyang; Tongchuan East

Service
- Type: Heavy rail

History
- Opened: December 1941

Technical
- Line length: 138 km (86 mi)
- Track gauge: 1,435 mm (4 ft 8 1/2 in) standard gauge
- Electrification: 50 Hz 25,000 V

The Xianyang–Tongchuan railway (Chinese: 咸铜铁路) is a railway line in Shaanxi, China.

== History ==
Construction on the line began in April 1939. The railway was completed and opened in December 1941. Due to declining passenger numbers amid competition from road, passenger service on the line was suspended in 1993. In May 2021, electrification of the line began. On 15 September 2021, passenger service was reintroduced on the line.

== Route ==
The line is 138 kilometres (86 mi) long.
