= Weicheng =

Weicheng may refer to:

- Weicheng District, Xianyang (渭城区), district in Xianyang, Shaanxi, China
- Weicheng District, Weifang (潍城区), district in Weifang, Shandong, China
- Weicheng, Wei County, Handan (魏城镇), town in Wei County, Handan, Hebei, China
- Fortress Besieged (围城), 1947 novel by Qian Zhongshu
