= Shang Yang =

Qin State statesman, chancellor and reformer (c. 390–338 BC)

Lord of Shang Shang Yang
- 商鞅
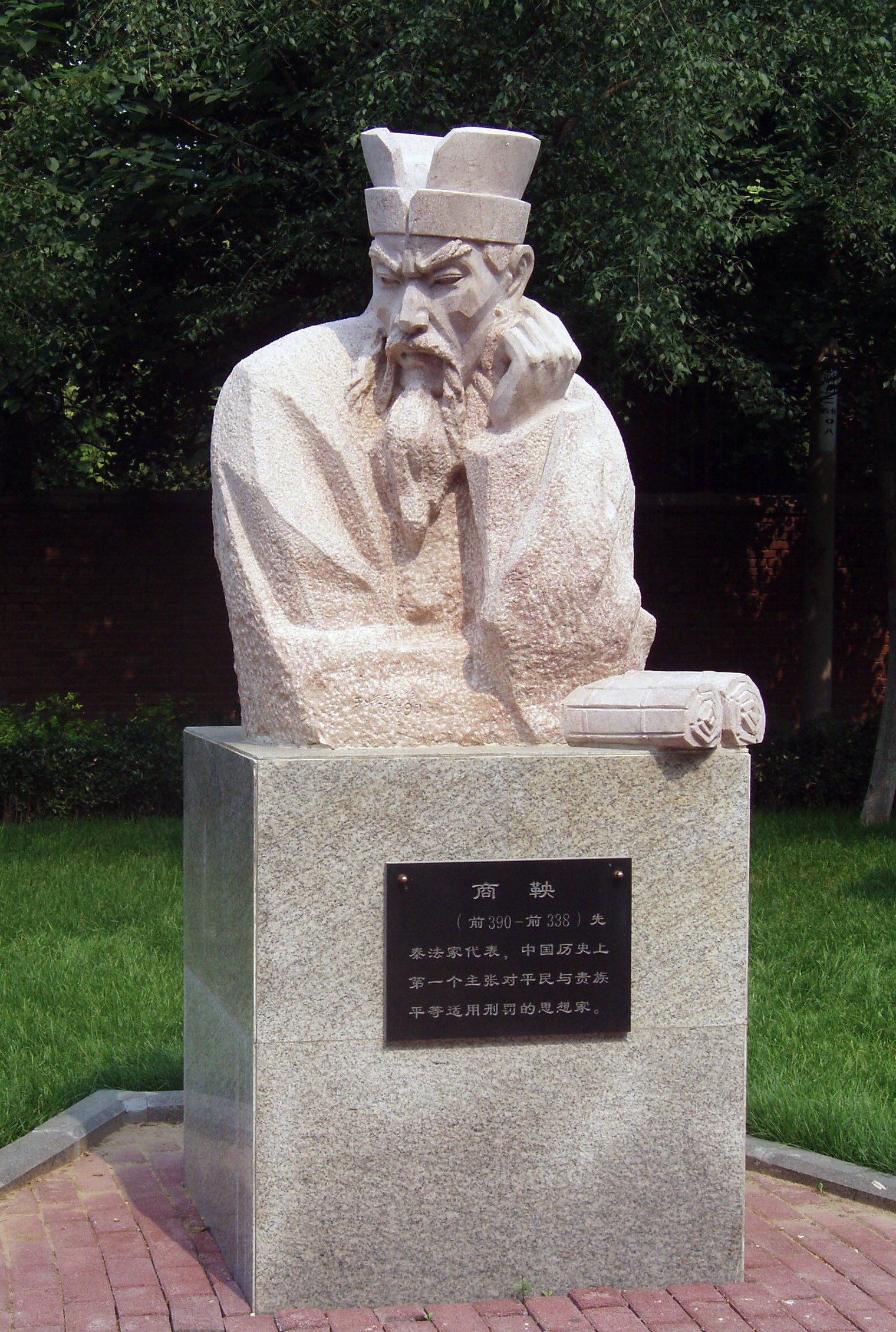
- Statue of Shang Yang

Chancellor of Qin
- In office 352 – 338 BC
- Monarch: Duke Xiao

Left Prime Minister of Qin
- In office 359 – 352 BC
- Monarch: Duke Xiao

Personal details
- Born: c. 390 BC State of Wey
- Died: 338 BC State of Qin

Shang Yang
- Chinese: 商鞅
Transcriptions
Standard Mandarin
- Hanyu Pinyin: Shāng Yāng
- Bopomofo: ㄕㄤ ㄧㄤ
- Gwoyeu Romatzyh: Shang Iang
- Wade–Giles: Shang^{1} Yang^{1}
- Tongyong Pinyin: Shang Yang
- IPA: [ʂáŋ jáŋ]
Yue: Cantonese
- Yale Romanization: Sēung Yēung
- Jyutping: soeng1 joeng1
- IPA: [sœŋ˥ jœŋ˥]
Southern Min
- Tâi-lô: Siong Ng
Old Chinese
- Baxter–Sagart (2014): *s.taŋ ʔaŋ

Shang Yang (Chinese: 商鞅; c. 390 – 338 BC), also known as Wei Yang (衞鞅) and originally surnamed Gongsun (公孫), was a chancellor and reformer of the State of Qin. Ultimately becoming arguably the "most famous and influential statesman" from the (early) Warring States period, he was more evidently known to Xun Kuang as a renowned military leader whose reforms strengthened Qin. Possibly going into broad circulation late in the period, writings associated with Shang Yang went on to influence the Han Feizi.

Born in the Zhou vassal state of Wey, he migrated to Wei, ultimately finding office in Qin in 359 BCE. Becoming Qin's chief minister for twenty years, he launched two series of reforms, laying the administrative, political and economic foundations that would eventually enable Qin to conquer the other six rival states, unifying China under centralized rule for the first time under the Qin dynasty. Scholars consider it likely that both he and his followers contributed to The Book of Lord Shang.

== Biography ==
According to the Shiji, Shang Yang was born as the son of a concubine, to the ruling ducal family of the minor state of Wey (衞). His surname (氏, lineage name) was Gongsun and his personal name Yang. As a member of the Wei family, he was also known as Wei Yang.

At a young age, Gongsun studied law and obtained a position under Prime Minister Shuzuo of Wei (魏, not the same as his birth state). With the support of Duke Xiao of Qin, he left his lowly position in Wei to become the chief adviser in Qin. His numerous reforms transformed the peripheral Qin state into a militarily powerful and strongly centralized kingdom. Changes to the state's legal system (which were said to have been built upon Li Kui's Canon of Laws) propelled the Qin to prosperity. Enhancing the administration through an emphasis on meritocracy, his policies weakened the power of the feudal lords.

In 341 BC, Qin attacked the state of Wei. Gongsun personally led the Qin army to defeat Wei, and eventually Wei ceded the land west of the Yellow River to Qin. For his role in the war, Gongsun received 15 cities in Shang as his personal fief, becoming known as the lord of Shang (Shang Jun) or Shang Yang. According to the Records of the Grand Historian, with his personal connections while serving in the court of Wei, Shang Yang invited Gongzi Ang, the Wei general, to negotiate a peace treaty. As soon as Ang arrived, he was taken prisoner, and the Qin army attacked, successfully defeating their opponents.

Shang Yang oversaw the construction of Xianyang. Mark Edward Lewis considered reorganization of the military as potentially responsible for the orderly plan of roads and fields throughout north China. This might be far fetched, but Gongsun was as much a military reformer as a legal one.

The Shang Yang school of thought was favoured by Emperor Wu of Han, and John Keay mentions that Tang figure Du You was drawn to Shang Yang.

== Reforms ==
Square scale used to measure items, based on Shang Yang's reforms. Shanghai Museum East.

He is credited by Han Fei, often considered to be the greatest representative of Chinese Legalism (法家), with the creation of two theories;

1. "fixing the standards" (定法)
2. "equality before the law" (一民)

Believing in the rule of law and considering loyalty to the state above that of the family, Yang introduced two sets of changes to the State of Qin. The first, in 356 BC, were-

1. Li Kui's Book of Law was implemented, with the important addition of a rule providing punishment equal to that of the perpetrator for those aware of a crime but failing to inform the government. He codified reforms into enforceable laws. The laws were stringent and multitudinous reformed by Yang and the punishments were strict.
2. Assigning land to soldiers based upon their military successes and stripping nobility unwilling to fight of their land rights. The army was separated into twenty military ranks, based upon battlefield achievements. The reform of military made Qin citizens willing to join the army and helped the Qin dynasty build the military power necessary to unify China.
3. As manpower was short in Qin, Yang encouraged the cultivation of unsettled lands and wastelands and immigration, favouring agriculture over luxury commerce (though also paying more recognition to especially successful merchants).

Yang introduced his second set of changes in 350 BC, which included a new standardized system of land allocation and reforms to taxation.

The vast majority of Yang's reforms were taken from policies instituted elsewhere, such as from Wu Qi of the State of Chu; however, Yang's reforms were more thorough and extreme than those of other states, and monopolized policy in the hands of the ruler. Under his tenure, Qin quickly caught up with and surpassed the reforms of other states.

== Domestic policies ==
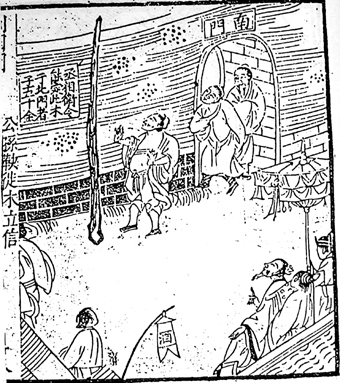
An individual moving a log with a reward of 50 taels of silver, used to establish trust between Shang Yang and the Qin people.

Yang introduced land reforms, privatized land, rewarded farmers who exceeded harvest quotas, enslaved farmers who failed to meet quotas, and used enslaved subjects as (state-owned) rewards for those who met government policies.

As manpower was short in Qin relative to the other states at the time, Yang enacted policies to increase its manpower. As Qin peasants were recruited into the military, he encouraged active migration of peasants from other states into Qin as a replacement workforce; this policy simultaneously increased the manpower of Qin and weakened the manpower of Qin's rivals. Yang made laws forcing citizens to marry at a young age and passed tax laws to encourage raising multiple children. He also enacted policies to free convicts who worked in opening wastelands for agriculture.

Yang partly abolished primogeniture (depending on the performance of the son) and created a double tax on households that had more than one son living in the household, to break up large clans into nuclear families.

Yang moved the capital from the city of Yueyang to Xianyang, in order to reduce the influence of nobles on the administration. Xianyang remained Qin's capital until its fall in 207 BC.

== Death ==
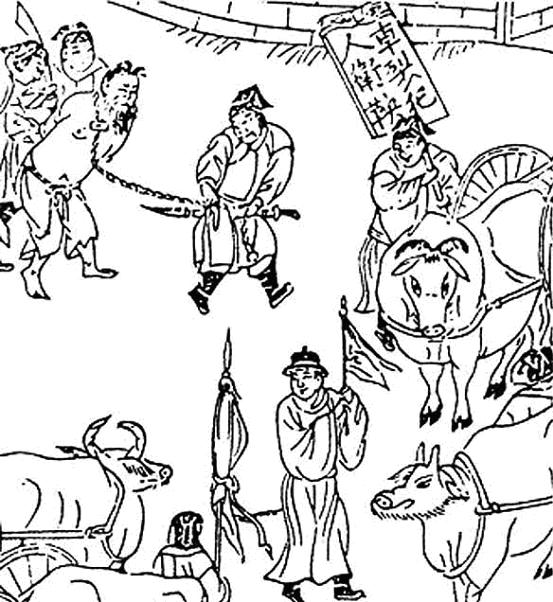
Shang Yang scheduled to be executed by dismemberment, Ming dynasty illustration.

Yang was deeply despised by the Qin nobility and became vulnerable after the death of Duke Xiao. The next ruler, King Huiwen, ordered the nine familial exterminations against Yang and his family, on the grounds of fomenting rebellion. Yang had previously humiliated the new duke "by causing him to be punished for an offense as though he were an ordinary citizen." According to Zhan Guo Ce, Yang went into hiding; at one point Yang was refused a room at an inn because one of his own laws prevented admission of a guest without proper identification.

Yang was executed by chēliè (車裂): dismemberment by being fastened to five chariots, cattle or horses and being torn to pieces); his whole family was also executed. Despite his death, King Huiwen kept the reforms enacted by Yang.

A number of alternate versions of Yang's death have survived. According to Sima Qian in his Records of the Grand Historian, Yang first escaped to Wei. However, he was hated there for his earlier betrayal of Gongzi Ang and was expelled. Yang then fled to his fiefdom, where he raised a rebel army but was killed in battle. After the battle, King Hui of Qin had Yang's corpse torn apart by chariots as a warning to others.

Following the execution of Yang, King Huiwen turned away from the central valley south to conquer Sichuan (Shu and Ba) in what Steven Sage calls a "visionary reorientation of thinking" toward material interests in Qin's bid for universal rule.

== Early modern assessments ==
A. F. P. Hulsewé considered Shang Yang the "founder of the school of law", and considers his unification of punishments one of his most important contributions; that is, giving the penalty of death to any grade of person disobeying the king's orders. Shang Yang even expected the king, though the source of law (authorizing it), to follow it. This treatment is in contrast to ideas more typical of archaic society, more closely represented in the Rites of Zhou as giving different punishments to different strata of society.

Hulsewe points out that Sima Tan considered equal treatment the "school of law's" most salient point: "They do not distinguish between close and far relatives, nor do they discriminate between noble and humble, but in a uniform manner they decide on them in law." The Han dynasty adopted essentially the same denominations of crimes, and conception of equality, as Shang Yang set down for Qin, without collective punishment of the three sets of relatives.

Shang Yang appeared to act according to his own teachings, and translator Duvendak (1928) references him as being considered "like a bamboo‑frame which keeps a bow straight, and one could not get him out of his straightness", even if spoken of by some pre-modern Chinese in ill regard with the fall of Qin. Duvendak believed that Shang Yang should be of interest not just to Sinologists, but Western Jurists as well.

Despite traditional history's dim view, Sima Qian recounts the immediate effect of his policies as such: After [the ordinances] had been in effect for ten years, the commoners of Qin were delighted; no one picked up articles lost on the road, there were no bandits or thieves in the mountains, households were well provided for and the people were well off. The commoners were brave in the duke's battles but cowardly in private feuds and the townships and cities were in good order. (Sima Qian 1994a, 90)

== Early references ==
Shang Yang's deeds are presented in the late pre-imperial Qin state's encyclopedic Lushi Chunqiu, though its opinion of him had already declined. Though ultimately becoming famous (and infamous) more broadly, the Han Feizi, traditionally placed near the end of the Warring States period, is the first preserved reference for writings associated with Shang Yang, with the Book of Lord of Shang possibly going into broad circulation late in the period alongside the Guanzi.

The Xunzi mentions Shang Yang among renowned military leaders of the recent past. The Xunzi does not directly mention Shang Yang as strengthening Qin, but Yuri Pines believed that it "clearly attributes" Qin's strengthening over (the past) "four generations" to him. A.C. Graham did not see Xun Kuang (or the Xunzi) as being otherwise apparently very familiar with Shang Yang, and it seems unlikely that the Zhuangzi's authors were very familiar with him either.

However, there is at least one possible earlier example to note, in the Analects, but only if Chapter 14 of the Analects is taken to be later than Confucius. Brooks & Taeko do not directly argue whether Chapter 14 references The Book of Lord Shang. They argue that Chapter 14 dates to circa 310 BCE. To note, some ideas in the Book of Lord Shang may as so generalizable to early Warring States period mobilization that they may not have to come from it.

The people do not like toil, but in their own interest the ruler must induce them to toil at farming. The ruler does not like criticism, but for the good of the state, the officer must sometimes criticize.

== Bibliography ==
Dedicated exclusively to his figure, Shang Yang's traditional biography is in Chapter 68 of the Shiji, with some additional details in other chapters. Although embellished, translator Yuri Pines did not consider it pure fiction, given relevant paleographic discoveries. Though, the events surrounding Shang Yang's death are too legendary to reliably comment on.

The Shiji became a more well known and influential source on Shang Yang than the Book of Lord Shang itself, and considered a better introduction to his ideas. While Sima Qian did not seem to personally like Shang Yang, he was still willing to praise him for his merits. Su Shi later criticized Sima Qian for this, arguing that Qin could still have become strong without him.

The winning court debate that saw Shang Yang attain office is purportedly depicted in the first "Revising the Laws" chapter of the Book of Lord Shang, and this chapter is particularly associated with him. The second chapter "Order to Cultivate Wastelands", has also been "overwhelmingly identified" with Shang Yang, at least in modern Chinese and Japanese scholarship.

The final chapter (26) of the Book of Lord Shang also claims to be a proposal by Shang Yang, though this may have just been a literary device wrapping up the work. It would have been much too advanced to implement in his time, so that Léon Vandermeersch found it difficult to believe it was ever implemented. Given archaeological discovery, Pines affirms it as reflecting the administrative practices of the late pre-imperial to Imperial Qin dynasty. Conforming with knowledge of Qin dynasty governance, it may have been implemented dating back to not long before unification.

=== Han Feizi Ch.43 ===
Earlier chapters of the Han Feizi (14,42) considered Shang Yang a model reformer together with Guan Zhong and Wu Qi; Wu Qi's reforms were just not as successful as Shang Yang's. Han Fei encouraging himself as a synthesizer of his predecessors, the Han Feizi's Chapter 43 ("Ding fa" 定法) contrasts Shen Buhai and Shang Yang as two different schools (jia), taking Shang Yang's school as focused on fa as including law, ordinances, decrees, reward and punishment.

Referring to Shang Yang and Shen Buhai as schools, the chapter is the least suggestive they could have had groups in the period. With much of the Book of Lord Shang written by Shang Yang's followers, it may have had devoted disciples, at least at the level of an 'intellectual current' (學派; xuepai).

The chapter praises Shang Yang's merits, considering fa law necessary, but criticizes his 'school' as narrowly focused on it. Sinologist Goldin takes this as an example of Han Fei trying to demonstrate superiority over his predecessors. Arguably, Shang Yang was as much a military reformer; Sima Qian attributes an "extraordinarily broad range of reforms" to him. Hence, the chapter likely contributes to a view of Shang Yang and what was later called the fa school as narrowly Legalist.

When Gongsun Yang governed Qin, he established a system of mutual reporting and responsibility for performance;

As for fa law, it means that regulations and ordinances are recorded and displayed in the official archives, that punishments and fines appear inevitable to the people's minds, that rewards are in place for those who are cautious in regard to the laws, and that punishments are applied to those who offend against the ordinances. This is what the ministers take as their guiding authority.

== In fiction and popular culture ==
- Portrayed by Shi Jingming in The Legend of Mi Yue (2015) as a guest appearance, depicting his execution.
- Portrayed by Wang Zhifei in the TV series The Qin Empire as a main character.
- Appears as a Great Person in 2025's Civilization VII. Shang Yang appears for the Han civilization, adding +3 influence to the palace when activated on it.

== See also ==
- Shizi
