= Duke Xiao of Qin =

Ruler of Chinese state of Qin from 361 to 338 BC

Duke Xiao of Qin 秦孝公
- Reign: 362–338 BC
- Predecessor: Duke Xian of Qin
- Successor: King Huiwen of Qin
- Born: 381 BC
- Died: 338 BC
- Issue: King Huiwen of Qin; Ji, Lord Yan
Names
- Ying Quliang (嬴渠梁)
Posthumous name
- Duke Xiao (孝公) or King Ping (平王)
- House: Ying
- Dynasty: Qin
- Father: Duke Xian of Qin

Duke Xiao of Qin (Chinese: 秦孝公; pinyin: Qín Xiào Gōng; 381–338 BC), personal name Ying Quliang, was a duke of the state of Qin during the Eastern Zhou dynasty, reigning from 362 to 338 BC. Duke Xiao is best known for employing the Legalist statesman Shang Yang from the state of Wei and authorizing him to conduct a series of ground-breaking political, military and economic reforms in Qin. Although the reforms were controversial and drew violent opposition from many Qin politicians, Duke Xiao supported Shang Yang fully and the reforms did help to transform Qin into a dominant superpower among the Seven Warring States.

Duke Xiao ascended to the throne of the Qin state in 362 BC at the age of 19, succeeding his father, Duke Xian. Duke Xiao was determined to restore the Qin state to its former glory as one of the Five Hegemons as it had been during the reign of his ancestor, Duke Mu. Hence, the duke sent out an announcement, calling for men of talent to aid him in strengthening Qin, promising them rewards of high offices and lands in return for their service. Wei Yang, later known as Shang Yang, was a scholar from the Legalist School who responded to the duke's call as he had been unsuccessful in attempting to start his career in other states.

Wei Yang was introduced to Duke Xiao by Jing Jian and had two audiences with the duke, during which he proposed ideas concerning governance based on the principles of Confucianism, Taoism and other schools of thought, but the duke was not impressed. During the third meeting, Wei proposed his ideas on strict governance, based on concepts from Legalism, and captured the duke's attention. Duke Xiao and Wei Yang had a discussion that lasted for three days and three nights, after which they drafted plans for reform. The plans were put into effect in 363 BC, although several Qin politicians objected strongly to the reforms. However, Duke Xiao supported Wei Yang fully and ensured that the reforms were implemented as planned.

The reforms caused ground-breaking changes in the Qin state and transformed it into a strict, controlling, militaristic state, which governed through tough and oppressive laws. Agriculture was expanded through forced migration to new regions, and citizens were rewarded or punished based on their military or agricultural achievements.

In 366 BC, the Qin armies defeated the allied forces from the states of Han and Wei at the Battle of Shimen. The Qin soldiers and officers were promoted to higher ranks based on the number of enemy heads they collected during battle. Qin pushed on to seize lands from Wei, which managed to survive only with the help of the state of Zhao, and Wei was drastically weakened by its losses and defeats.

== Life ==
=== Succession ===
Duke Xiao of Qin was born on the 9th day of the first lunar month in the fourth year of Duke Xian's reign, corresponding to 6 December 382 BC on the Julian calendar. According to Records of the Grand Historian, Duke Xian died in the 24th year of his reign, and his son Duke Xiao ascended the throne at the age of 21.

Even before the birth of Duke Xiao, the state of Qin had suffered a prolonged period of political instability under four successive rulers—Duke Li, Duke Zao, Duke Jian, and Duke Chu. During this time, Qin's national strength was greatly diminished. Taking advantage of this turmoil, the state of Wei seized control of the Hexi region (the area west of the southern section of the Yellow River between modern-day Shanxi and Shaanxi provinces). After ascending the throne, Duke Xian (Duke Xiao's father) worked to stabilize the borders and relocated the capital to Liyang (southeast of present-day Fuping County, Weinan, Shaanxi). He launched multiple campaigns to reclaim the lost Hexi territory, but died before achieving this goal.

=== Talent Recruitment Edict ===
When Duke Xiao of Qin ascended the throne, he ruled concurrently with King Wei of Qi, King Xuan of Chu, King Hui of Wei, Marquis Wen of Yan, Marquis Zhao of Han, and Marquis Cheng of Zhao.

At that time, the six major states of the Warring States period had already formed east of the Yellow River and Mount Xiao, while over ten smaller states lay between the Huai and Si Rivers. The royal house of Zhou had become weak, and the various states were locked in warfare, conquering one another. Of the six powers, Chu and Wei shared borders with Qin. The state of Wei occupied Qin's former Hexi region and built defensive walls northward from Zheng (modern Huazhou District, Weinan, Shaanxi) along the Luo River. Chu occupied the Wuguan and Qianzhong regions, extending south from Hanzhong.

Isolated in the remote western region of Yongzhou, Qin was excluded from the diplomatic alliances of the Central Plains states and treated like a barbarian country.

Duke Xiao sought to restore the hegemony of Duke Mu of Qin. He extended benevolence, aided widows and orphans, recruited warriors, enforced merit-based rewards, and famously issued a public edict calling for talented individuals to present strategies for enriching and strengthening the state. The edict reads:

Long ago, Duke Mu governed the region between Qi and Yong, cultivated virtue, and commanded military force. He quelled the chaos in Jin to the east, using the Yellow River as a boundary, and ruled the western Rong and Di tribes, expanding the land by a thousand li. The Son of Heaven acknowledged him as hegemon, and the feudal lords came to congratulate him. This glorious enterprise founded prosperity for future generations.

But due to the misrule of Dukes Li, Zao, Jian, and Chu, our state has suffered internally and had no energy for external matters. The Three Jin states seized our lands west of the Yellow River, and Qin became despised by the feudal lords—nothing more shameful than this.

When my father Duke Xian came to power, he stabilized the borders and moved the capital to Liyang. He wished to reclaim the lost lands and revive the governance of Duke Mu, but passed away before it could be realized. I reflect on his intent and feel deep sorrow in my heart.

If among my guests or officials there is anyone who can present extraordinary strategies to strengthen Qin, I shall promote him and share the lands with him.

That same year, Duke Xiao launched two military campaigns: one eastward to besiege Shan City (modern Hancheng, Shaanxi) and one westward against the Western Rong, where the Rong King Gua was slain.

Taking advantage of Qin’s transition of power, the states of Zhao and Han jointly attacked Qin.

In 343 BC, King Xian of Zhou sent sacrificial meat to Qin as a symbol of acknowledgment.

=== Shang Yang's Reforms ===
==== Arrival in Qin ====
Shang Yang, originally from the state of Wei, served as an attendant (zhongshuzi) to Prime Minister Gongshu Cuo. After Gongshu's death, Shang Yang learned of Duke Xiao's public edict seeking talented individuals and traveled to Qin, bringing with him The Canon of Law (《法经》) compiled by Li Kui. He was introduced to Duke Xiao through Jing Jian, the duke's favored minister.

In his first audience, Shang Yang promoted the doctrine of the "Way of the Emperor" (dào of the sage-kings), but Duke Xiao dozed off during the conversation. Afterward, he criticized Shang Yang as arrogant and unworthy. Five days later, Shang Yang returned, advocating the "Way of the King" (rule through benevolence), but again failed to gain the duke’s favor. A third time, he spoke of the "Way of the Hegemon" (realpolitik-style domination), which the duke found agreeable but still did not act on. By this time, however, Shang Yang had discerned the ruler’s true political intentions.

Finally, in a fourth audience, Shang Yang laid out specific strategies to strengthen the state and enrich the nation. Duke Xiao was so engrossed in their discussion that he unconsciously moved his knees closer to Shang Yang as they spoke. The two conversed for days without fatigue. Jing Jian, puzzled by this change, asked Shang Yang what had happened. Shang Yang explained that Duke Xiao had no interest in abstract ideals that required generations to bear fruit; he desired swift success to dominate the realm in his own lifetime, and thus was drawn to pragmatic proposals.

==== Land Reclamation Order ====
Encouraged by Shang Yang, Duke Xiao of Qin decided to implement domestic reforms. However, these faced strong opposition from conservative nobles such as Gan Long and Du Zhi. After intense debates, Duke Xiao issued the Land Reclamation Order (垦草令) in 359 BC, considered the prelude to full-scale reform. (Note: Many historical records date the start of Shang Yang's reforms to 356 BC. However, the reform debates concluded earlier, and the Land Reclamation Order was already a concrete plan proposed by Shang Yang. See: Sima, Qian (1959). 史记·卷六十八·商君列传 [Records of the Grand Historian, Vol. 68: Biography of Lord Shang] (in Simplified Chinese). Zhonghua Book Company.; 商君书·更法 [The Book of Lord Shang, "On Changing the Law"] (in Simplified Chinese). Zhonghua Book Company. 1974.; Yang, Kuan (2001). 战国史料编年辑证 [Chronological and Textual Research on Warring States Historical Materials] (in Simplified Chinese). Shanghai: Shanghai People's Publishing House. pp. 289, 334, 377. ISBN 7208031851.)

The decree focused on stimulating agricultural production, suppressing commerce, reshaping social values to elevate the prestige of agriculture, curbing the privileges of nobles and officials, involving aristocrats in farm labor, unifying tax collection systems, and introducing other foundational policies.

==== First Phase of Reform ====
Following the success of the Land Reclamation Order, Duke Xiao appointed Shang Yang as zuo shuzhang (左庶长, Left Assistant Chancellor) in 356 BC to carry out the first phase of comprehensive reforms.

The main measures included: reforming household registration, implementing the "mutual responsibility system" (连坐法), enforcing strict military laws, awarding military merit, abolishing hereditary privileges (世卿世禄), establishing a twenty-rank system of military nobility, encouraging agriculture and textile production, punishing private disputes, codifying laws into the Qin Legal Code (秦律), and promoting the nuclear family system.

These reforms began to strengthen Qin’s national power. In 358 BC, Qin defeated Han at Xishan (present-day west of Mount Xiong'er, Henan). In 357, King Xuan of Chu sent his right court minister Hei to marry Duke Xiao’s daughter and form an alliance with Qin. In 355, Duke Xiao held a summit with King Hui of Wei at Duping (modern-day Chengcheng County, Shaanxi), marking Qin’s re-entry into interstate diplomacy.

==== Second Phase of Reform ====
Xianyang, the new capital, was located in the Guanzhong Plain, north of a plateau and south of the Wei River, with access to the Yellow River and Hangu Pass via the Wei River corridor. To facilitate eastward expansion beyond Hangu Pass, Duke Xiao ordered the construction of the Jique Palace and a new capital in 350 BC based on the urban models of Lu and Wei. In the following year, the capital was moved from Liyang to Xianyang, and the second phase of reforms was implemented.

The main policies included: eliminating the well-field system, introducing private land ownership and transfer rights, enforcing county-level administration, introducing poll taxes, standardizing weights and measures, burning private philosophical texts, promoting legal clarity, restricting influence from private clans, banning itinerant officials, and enforcing residential registration laws.

Following the reforms, Qin became wealthy and powerful. Citizens were prosperous, theft disappeared, and the countryside was peaceful. People were brave in public service but avoided private conflict. In recognition, King Xian of Zhou granted Duke Xiao the title of hegemon, and envoys from many states came to offer congratulations. In 348, Marquis Zhao of Han visited Qin to conclude a truce. In 342, Duke Xiao sent Crown Prince Si (later King Huiwen of Qin) to lead 92 Western Rong tribes to pay tribute to King Xian of Zhou, symbolizing Qin's leadership in the west.

=== Hexi Campaign ===
The recovery of the Hexi region and the restoration of Duke Mu of Qin’s hegemony were longstanding goals of both Duke Xian and Duke Xiao of Qin. As early as Duke Xian’s reign, Qin and Wei had fought several battles over Hexi, with Qin emerging victorious at Luoyin (modern southwest Dali County, Shaanxi), Mount Shimen (modern southwest Yuncheng, Shanxi), and Shaoliang (modern southwest Hancheng, Shaanxi). Following Shang Yang’s two rounds of reforms, Qin's national strength increased significantly, enabling it to reclaim the Hexi region.

==== Battle of Yuanli ====
In 354 BC, the state of Zhao invaded Wei’s ally Wei (not to be confused with Wei the invader), and seized Qī and Fuqiu (both in modern Changyuan County, Henan). Wei intervened and laid siege to Zhao’s capital, Handan (modern Handan, Hebei). Seizing the opportunity while Wei's main forces were away, Duke Xiao dispatched troops to attack the Wei stronghold at Yuanli (modern south of Chengcheng County, Shaanxi), achieving a decisive victory by killing 7,000 Wei soldiers and occupying Shaoliang.

That same year, Duke Xiao ordered Gongsun Zhuang to attack Han and besiege Jiaocheng (modern west of Sanmenxia, Henan), though it was not taken. However, they occupied Shangzhi, Anling (modern north of Yanling County, Henan), and Shanshi (modern northeast of Xinzheng, Henan), and fortified these cities, inserting Qin influence into the border region between Han and Wei.

==== Battle of Anyi and Guyang ====
In 353 BC, Marquis Cheng of Zhao sent envoys to seek military assistance from Qi. King Wei of Qi responded by dispatching two armies. One joined with forces from Song under Jing Dui and from Wei under Gongsun Cang to besiege Xiangling (modern Suixian County, Henan), a Wei stronghold.

At the same time, Wei forces breached Handan, but were defeated by another Qi army led by Tian Ji and Sun Bin at the Battle of Guiling. Chu’s King Xuan also sent General Jing She to assist Zhao and seized territory between the Sui and Hui rivers.

In 352, taking advantage of Wei’s weakened interior, Duke Xiao appointed Shang Yang as Da Liang Zao (大良造, Chief Architect of State) and ordered a full invasion. Qin occupied the old Wei capital of Anyi (modern northwest of Xia County, Shanxi). (Note: Historian Liang Yusheng argues that the "Anyi" in this context may actually refer to Guyang; Yang Kuan believes that by 361 King Hui of Wei had already moved the capital to Daliang, making the old capital Anyi part of contested territory. See: Yang Kuan, Chronological and Textual Research on Warring States Historical Materials, p. 334.)

To defend against Qin, King Hui of Wei ordered construction of a defensive wall east of Guyang (modern east of Yan'an, Shaanxi) in the Shang Commandery region, known as the Xiaoshan Great Wall. In 351, Shang Yang once again led troops to besiege and capture Guyang.

==== Alliance at Tongdi ====
Also in 352 BC, King Hui of Wei, with assistance from Han, defeated the allied forces of Qi, Song, and Wei besieging Xiangling. Qi was forced to request Chu's General Jing She to mediate a truce.

In 351, King Hui and Marquis Cheng of Zhao concluded an alliance near the Zhang River, leading to the withdrawal of Wei troops from Handan. With peace restored with the other states, Wei concentrated its forces westward, recapturing Anyi and besieging Guyang again.

To buy time for domestic reforms, Duke Xiao held a peace summit with King Hui at Tongdi (modern southwest Huazhou District, Weinan, Shaanxi) in 350, temporarily easing tensions.

==== Alliance at Fengze ====
King Hui of Wei, under the pretext of paying tribute to the Zhou King, summoned the Twelve Lords of Sishang (泗上十二诸侯) to plan a coalition against Qin. In response, Duke Xiao adopted Shang Yang’s strategy of "honoring Wei as king" to alter its aggressive posture. In 344 BC, Shang Yang traveled to Wei and advised King Hui that in addition to commanding smaller states like Song, Wei, Zou, and Lu, he should seek northern alliance with Yan, attack Qi in the east to subdue Zhao, ally with Qin in the west, and attack Chu in the south to subjugate Han—thus securing true hegemony.

Shang Yang also suggested that King Hui first claim the royal title to align with the will of the people. King Hui accepted this plan, proclaimed himself king, constructed grand palaces, and adopted royal insignia such as red robes and seven-star flags. He convened the Fengze Assembly (modern south Kaifeng, Henan), attended by Prince Shaoguan of Qin and Marquis Su of Zhao. (Note: Records of the Grand Historian vol. 43 dates this as Year 4 of Marquis Su of Zhao. Historian Qian Mu argues this meeting actually occurred in Year 6 of his reign. See: Qian Mu, Chronological Studies of Pre-Qin Philosophers, p. 240.)

However, King Hui’s breach of ritual protocol angered Qi and Chu, and the other lords shifted allegiance toward Qi.

==== Battle of Western Border ====
In 343 BC, Qin constructed a fortress at Wucheng (modern east Huazhou District, Weinan, Shaanxi).

In 341, Wei suffered a major defeat at the Battle of Maling by the State of Qi. General Pang Juan committed suicide, and Crown Prince Shen was captured. Seizing this opportunity, Shang Yang told Duke Xiao:

"The relationship between Qin and Wei is like an internal disease—either Wei will absorb Qin, or Qin will conquer Wei. Wei occupies the strategic highlands to the west, controls the region east of Mount Xiao, and shares a border with Qin along the Yellow River. When Wei is strong, it encroaches westward; when weak, it retreats eastward. Now, with your wisdom and virtue, Qin is prosperous. Wei has just been crushed by Qi and abandoned by the other states. This is an ideal moment to attack. If Wei is defeated, it will withdraw east. Once it retreats, Qin will secure the natural defenses of the Yellow River and Mount Xiao, and with this stronghold, Qin can command the eastern states—this is the foundation of imperial dominion."

Duke Xiao accepted Shang Yang’s plan and launched a large-scale invasion.

In the same year, Qin allied with Qi and Zhao to attack Wei. In the ninth month, Duke Xiao sent Shang Yang to attack Wei’s Hedong region. Wei dispatched Prince Ang (公子卬) to resist. During a standoff, Shang Yang sent a letter to Ang:

"We once enjoyed a friendly relationship. Now as generals of enemy states, I cannot bear to fight you. Let us meet face to face, swear an oath, drink together, and then withdraw our armies for peace between Qin and Wei."

Ang agreed, but during the meeting, Shang Yang ambushed and captured him. Taking advantage of the confusion, he launched a surprise attack and routed the Wei army. Weakened by defeats from Qi and Qin, King Hui of Wei was forced to cede part of the Hexi region to Qin in exchange for peace. (Note: Records of the Grand Historian vol. 68 states that Wei ceded Hexi to Qin after the western border battle; vol. 5 notes that in the 8th year of King Huiwen of Qin, Wei officially surrendered the land, indicating full recovery occurred in 330.)

In recognition of his achievements, Shang Yang was enfeoffed with 15 towns in the regions of Yu and Shang, earning the title "Lord Shang." (Note: The Ancient Bamboo Annals records that in the 30th year of King Hui of Liang, Qin enfeoffed Wei Yang at Wu and renamed him Shang. Some interpretations identify "Yu-Shang" as referring to Shang County in Hongnong. Others suggest Yu and Shang were separate places. Yang Kuan supports the identification with Shang County. See: Yang Kuan, Chronological and Textual Research on Warring States Historical Materials, p. 377.)

In 338, Qin again attacked Wei, defeating its army at Anmen (modern south of Hejin, Shanxi), and captured its general Wei Cuo. That same year, Qin allied with the Dali Rong to besiege He yang (modern southeast of Hancheng, Shaanxi).

=== Death ===
In 338 BC, Duke Xiao fell gravely ill. According to the Strategies of the Warring States, he intended to pass the throne to Shang Yang, who declined.

Five months later, Duke Xiao died and was buried at Di Yu (弟圉). His son succeeded him as King Huiwen of Qin. Shang Yang, accused by Prince Qian of treason, was defeated and executed at Tongdi. (Note: Records of the Grand Historian vol. 15 names Tongdi as the execution site, while vol. 68 names it Zheng Minchi (郑黾池).) His corpse was brought to Xianyang and dismembered by chariots as public punishment.

== Legacy ==
Duke Xiao ruled Qin for 24 years and died at the age of 44 in 338 BC. He was succeeded by his son, King Huiwen of Qin. Duke Xiao was given the posthumous name of "Xiao", which means "filial". The reforms that took place during his reign helped to lay a strong foundation for Qin's eventual unification of China under the Qin dynasty, under the leadership of Duke Xiao's descendant, Zheng, who became Qin Shi Huang, the first emperor of China.

Duke Xiao was also the last ruler of Qin to be addressed as "duke" (Chinese: 公; pinyin: gōng), as his successors titled themselves "kings" (Chinese: 王; pinyin: wáng). This change reflected the loss of authority of the central government, the Zhou dynasty, and rulers of several other feudal states had begun to call themselves "kings" instead of "dukes" as well.

== Family ==
Concubines:

- Lady, of Han, the mother of Prince Ji

Sons:

- Crown Prince Si (太子駟; 356–311 BC), ruled as King Huiwen of Qin from 338–311 BC
- Prince Ji (公子疾; d. 300 BC)
  - Known by his fiefdom, Master of Chuli (樗裡子), or by his title, Lord Yan (嚴君)
  - Served as the Prime Minister (庶長) of Qin from 306–300 BC
- Prince Hua (公子華)

Duke Xiao of Qin House of Ying Born: 381 BC Died: 338 BC
Regnal titles
Preceded by Duke Xian of Qin	Duke of Qin; 361–338 BC	Succeeded by King Huiwen of Qin as King of Qin
