= Huang Wenxiu =

Chinese village official (1989-2019)

Huang Wenxiu 黄文秀

First Secretary of Baini village in Leye County, Guangxi
- In office 2018–2019

Deputy Secretary of the Party Committee of Naman town in Tianyang County, Guangxi
- In office 2017–2018

Personal details
- Born: 18 April 1989 Tianyang District, Baise, Guangxi, China
- Died: 17 June 2019 (aged 30) Lingyun County, Baise, Guangxi, China
- Party: Chinese Communist Party
- Education: Changzhi University; Beijing Normal University
- Occupation: Village official

Chinese name
- Simplified Chinese: 黄文秀
- Traditional Chinese: 黃文秀
Transcriptions
Standard Mandarin
- Hanyu Pinyin: Huáng Wénxiù
- Wade–Giles: Huang2 Wen2-hsiu4
Yue: Cantonese
- Jyutping: Wong4 Man4-sau3

Zhuang name
- Zhuang: Vangz Vwnzsiu

Huang Wenxiu (Chinese: 黄文秀; pinyin: Huáng Wénxiù; Zhuang: Vangz Vwnzsiu; 18 April 1989 – 17 June 2019) was a Chinese Communist Party village official of Zhuang ethnicity. During her time as the First Secretary of Baini village in Guangxi, she implemented economic development and poverty reduction initiatives. Following her death in 2019 from a flash flood, the Chinese Communist Party posthumously elevated Huang as national model for poverty alleviation.

== Early life ==
Huang was born on 18 April 1989, one of three children born to a poor peasant family in Tianyang District of Baise City in Guangxi Zhuang Autonomous Region. Despite the poverty and her parents' illnesses, she worked hard from a young age and was determined to receive a better education. In college entrance examinations in 2007, Huang did not perform well and in 2008, she retook examinations and on the same year, she was accepted into Changzhi University to study ideology and political science. She graduated in 2010 and in 2011, she became a member of the Chinese Communist Party.

In 2013, she was admitted to the School of Philosophy at Beijing Normal University and graduated with a degree in law in 2016. Following her graduation, she gave up her desire of finding a profession in Beijing and instead, she decided to return to Baise to work with rural government's poverty alleviation. When asked why she decided to work in a remote rural area, she stated that: "Baise is the main battlefield for poverty alleviation. Why shouldn't I come? Our party is a party that truly seeks development and happiness for the people. I am a Communist Party member, and this is my mission."

== Political career ==
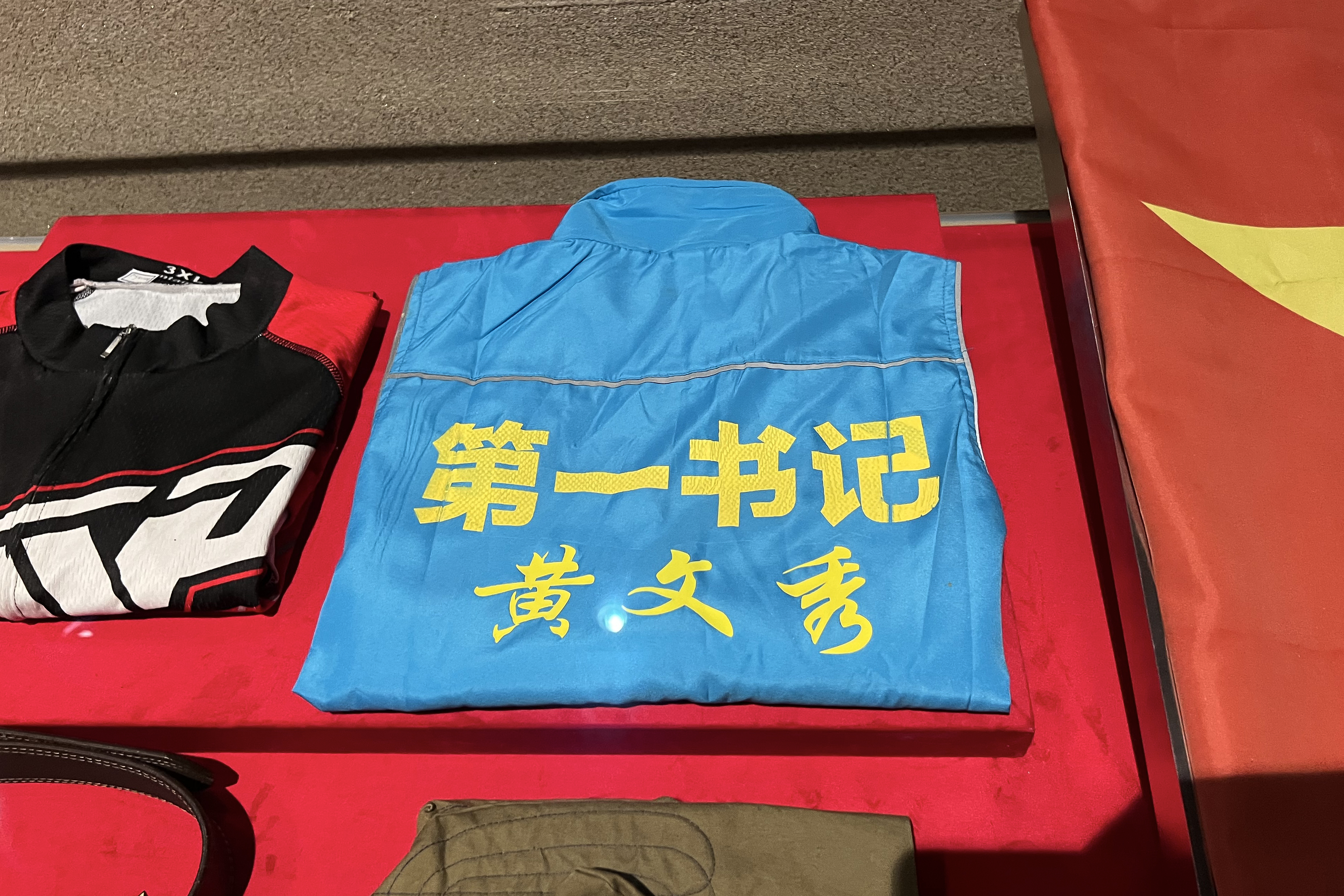
Huang's vest identifying her as village party secretary, on display at the Museum of the Chinese Communist Party in Beijing

She returned to Baise in 2016 and was assigned to work in the Propaganda Department of the Baise Municipal Party Committee. In August 2017, she was assigned to work as deputy secretary of the Party Committee in Naman town in Tianyang County, Baise. In 2018, she was appointed as the first secretary of Baini village in Leye County, a key county in Guangxi, for national poverty alleviation and development work.

When she first took office, she found 103 households with 474 people identified as registered impoverished households in the village, with a poverty incidence rate of 22%. As a result, the village was categorized as a deeply impoverished. The households were scattered across several different hills, which posed a significant challenge for her as she was unfamiliar with the village's terrain to quickly grasp the detailed situation of all impoverished households. Regardless, she engaged with the community and after two months of investigation, she understood the overall situation of the entire village. The village has a total of 472 households with 2068 people. There are 195 households with 883 people identified as registered impoverished households. After starting her work in the village, she led the village committee and others to conduct field visits for learning, invited technical experts for on-site guidance, conducted household-by-household mobilization and propaganda, and led party members in demonstrating agriculture techniques. These efforts swiftly promoted rapid development in the village's collective economy. In 2018 alone, through the establishment of an e-commerce service station, they helped villagers sell their agricultural produce, generating sales of around 220,000 yuan and creating additional income of approximately 2,500 yuan per household for more than 30 impoverished families in the village.

During her tenure as first secretary of Baini village, she was known for her frugal and simplistic lifestyle when providing assistance to impoverished families and left-behind children in the village. She also helped underprivileged students, who have been admitted to universities, to apply for various subsidies, enabling them to have financial support for higher studies.

=== Death ===
On the evening of 16 June 2019, heavy rain suddenly triggered flash floods in Lingyun County, Guangxi causing severe damage to several road sections. In the early hours of 17 June, Huang, who had just visited her seriously ill father in Baise, headed back to Leye County but went missing while driving through Lingyun County. On 18 June, search and rescue team members found Huang's body in the downstream river channel, confirming that she had died after her vehicle was washed away by a flash flood. On 22 June, her funeral service was held in Baise and was attended by over 100 people, and following her funeral, she was buried at Baifuyuan Cemetery in Baise.

== Legacy ==
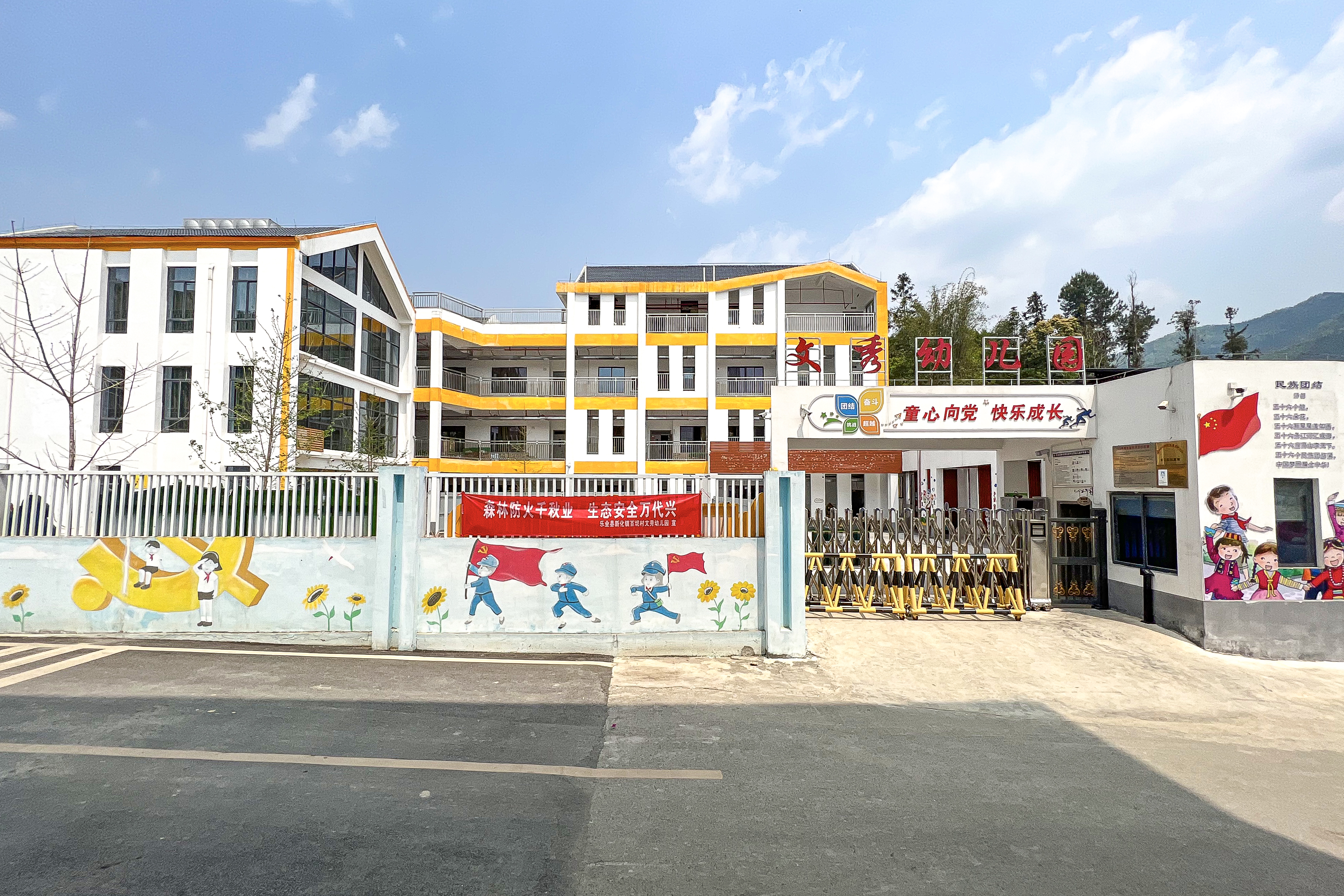
Wenxiu Kindergarten in Baini village

In July 2019, the General Secretary of the Chinese Communist Party and President of China Xi Jinping offered condolences to Huang's family and issued instructions honoring her. In recognition of her work as village party secretary, Xi honored her as an 'national outstanding Communist Party member' stating "learn from Huang Wenxiu... Be brave enough to shoulder responsibilities and willing to show dedications, so as to make new and greater contributions in the Long March of the new era", hence making her into a national model and modern-day hero in China. On 1 July 2019, the Publicity Department of the Chinese Communist Party posthumously awarded Huang the title 'Model of our Times'.

She was also posthumously awarded the following:

- March 8th Red Banner Bearer by the All-China Women's Federation (21 June 2019)
- Title 'National Model for Poverty Alleviation' by the Ministry of Human Resources and Social Security and State Council Leading Group Office of Poverty Alleviation and Development (28 June 2019)
- National 1 May Labor Medal by the All-China Federation of Trade Unions (17 July 2019)
- Title 'Guangxi 8 March Red Flag Bearer' by the Guangxi Zhuang Autonomous Region Women's Federation (20 June 2019)
- Title 'Outstanding Communist Party Member of the Autonomous Region' by the Guangxi Zhuang Autonomous Regional Committee of the Chinese Communist Party (24 June 2019)
- Guangxi Youth May Fourth Medal by the Guangxi Zhuang Autonomous Region Committee of the Communist Youth League (2019)
- Guangxi May First Labor Medal by the Guangxi Zhuang Autonomous Region Federation of Trade Unions (2019)
- Title 'Baise City Outstanding Communist Party Member' by the Baise Municipal Party Committee (2019)
- Title 'Baise City 8 March Red Flag Bearer' by the Baise Women's Federation (2019)
- Title 'County's Outstanding Communist Party Member' by the Leye County Party Committee (2019)
- Title ''National Model of Dedication and Contribution' by the Publicity Department of the Chinese Communist Party (September 2019)
- Title 'National Model for Poverty Alleviation and Development' by the National Poverty Alleviation Summary and Commendation Conference (2021)
- July 1 Medal by the Central Committee of the Chinese Communist Party (2021)

=== Namesakes ===
- A kindergarten and clinic in Baini village
- A class of Baise City Education Foundation

== In popular culture ==
An opera based on Huang's life On the Way to Alleviate Poverty was directed by Tian Qinxin and was presented for the first time on 24 June 2020 at the National Centre for the Performing Arts in Beijing. In the 2020 movie Huang Wenxiu, she was portrayed by actress Lang Yueting. In the 2022 TV series about Huang The Daughter of the Mountains, she was portrayed by actress Yang Rong. In 2023, an animated series about her was released.
