= Battle against poverty =

Poverty reduction campaign in China

- Simplified Chinese: 脱贫攻坚战
Transcriptions
Standard Mandarin
- Hanyu Pinyin: Tuōpín gōngjiānzhàn

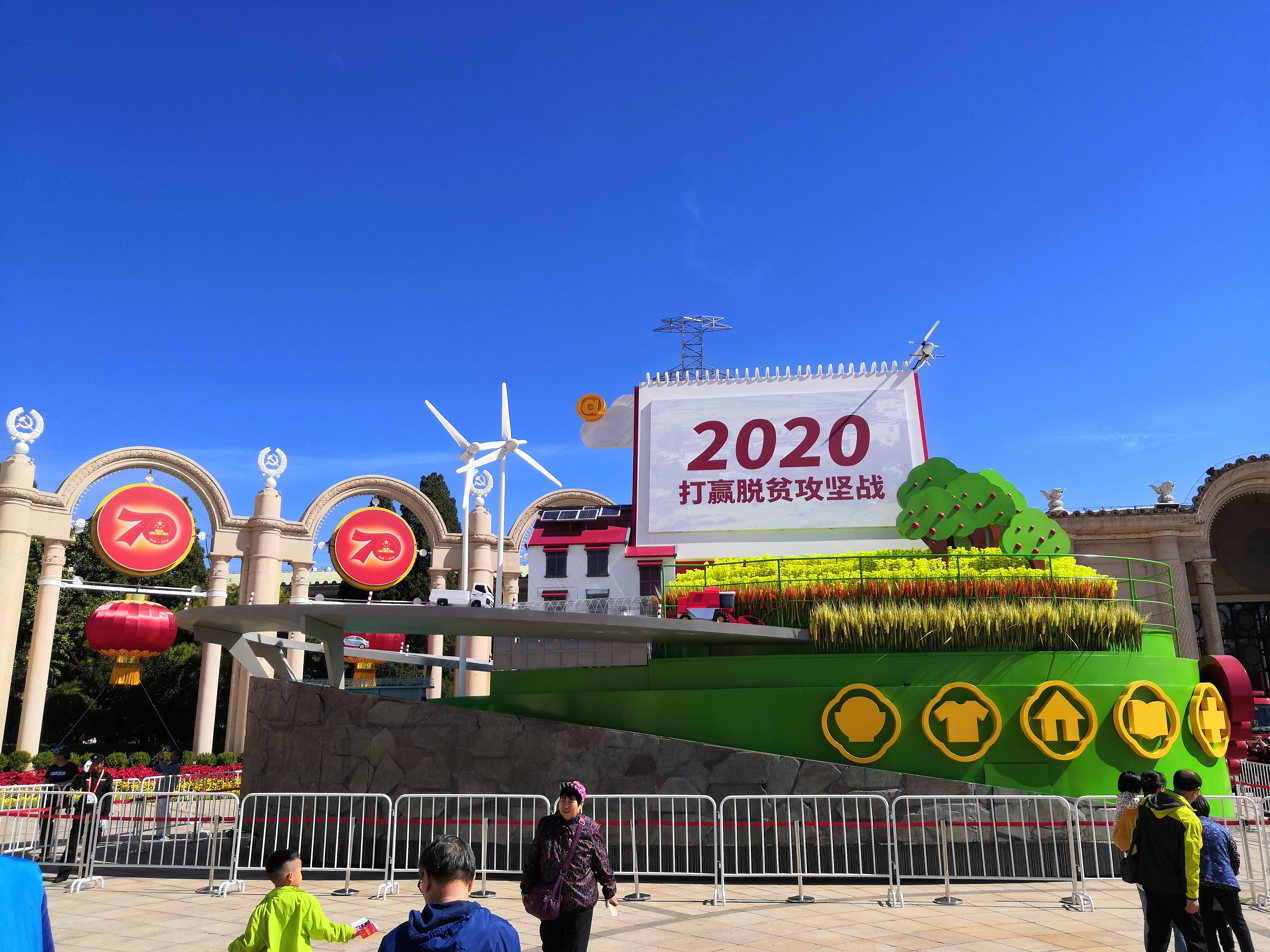
"Poverty Alleviation" themed float is located in the exhibition celebrating the 70th anniversary of the People's Republic of China in Beijing

The battle against poverty was a policy and campaign of the People's Republic of China and the Chinese Communist Party to fight poverty.

The campaign was first proposed by CCP general secretary Xi Jinping, who said China still had tens of millions of people that did not escape poverty. It began at the fifth plenary session of the 18th Central Committee of the Chinese Communist Party at the end of October 2015 and was incorporated to the 13th Five-Year Plan in 2016. It aimed to solve the core problems of poor areas and poor people through targeted poverty alleviation within five years before the end of 2020. The campaign concluded with the National Poverty Alleviation Summary and Commendation Conference in 2021.

== History ==
=== Background ===
On 21 October 2015, CCP general secretary Xi Jinping mentioned in a speech in London that "according to China's standards, there are still 70 million people in China who have not escaped poverty. According to the United Nations standards, there are still about 200 million people living below the poverty line in China." He proposed a plan to continue to reduce poverty. At the end of October 2015, the fifth plenary Session of the 18th CCP Central Committee reviewed and passed the "Proposal of the CCP Central Committee on Formulating the 13th Five-Year Plan for National Economic and Social Development", which proposed the goals, tasks and requirements for the fight against poverty during the 13th Five-Year Plan period. The plan was focused on rural hukou holders who live in the countryside. It set three goals to be achieved by 2020:

- Lift all rural residents below the current national rural poverty line out of poverty
- Lift all national-level poor counties out of poverty
- Eliminate overall regional poverty

From 27 to 28 November 2015, the Central Poverty Alleviation and Development Work Conference was held in Beijing, where Xi said that eliminating poverty, improving people's livelihood, and gradually achieving common prosperity are the essential requirements of socialism and an important mission of the CCP. He also required the whole country and the whole party to ensure that by 2020, all poor areas and poor people will enter a well-off society in an all-round way. On November 29 of the same year, the "Decision of the CCP Central Committee and the State Council on Winning the Battle Against Poverty" was issued, and various ministries and commissions subsequently detailed the decision:

Indicators of poverty alleviation in poverty-stricken areas and poverty reduction during the 13th Five-Year Plan period
Index	2015	2020 Target	Goal
Population in poverty (10,000 people)	5630	None	Binding
Poor and idle villages with archived files (number)	1280	None	Binding
National-level poor counties	832	None	Binding
Poor population relocated for poverty alleviation (10,000 people)	-	981	Binding
Average annual growth rate of per capita disposable income of farmers in poverty-stricken areas (%)	11.7	Higher than the national average	Anticipated
Rural centralized water supply rate in poverty-stricken areas (%)	75	≥83	Anticipated
Renovation rate of existing dilapidated houses of registered poor households (%)	-	Near 100	Binding
Compulsory education consolidation rate in poor counties (%)	90	93	Anticipated
Number of registered poor households that have fallen into poverty (or returned to poverty) due to illness (10,000 households)	838.5	None	Anticipated
Annual income of collective economy of registered poor villages (10,000 yuan)	2	≥5	Anticipated

=== The campaign ===
Xi promoted the slogan Two No Worries and Three Guarantees; "two no worries" means no worries about food and clothing, while "three guarantees" means compulsory education, basic medical care, and housing security are guaranteed. To meet the first target, local governments were required to raise their per capita income to above the rural poverty line of ¥4,000 yuan. To meet the second target, local governments were required to cover their school fees, significantly subsidize the cost of their annual health insurance, and provide safe permanent structures for housing them. During the campaign, a total of $600 billion was spent.

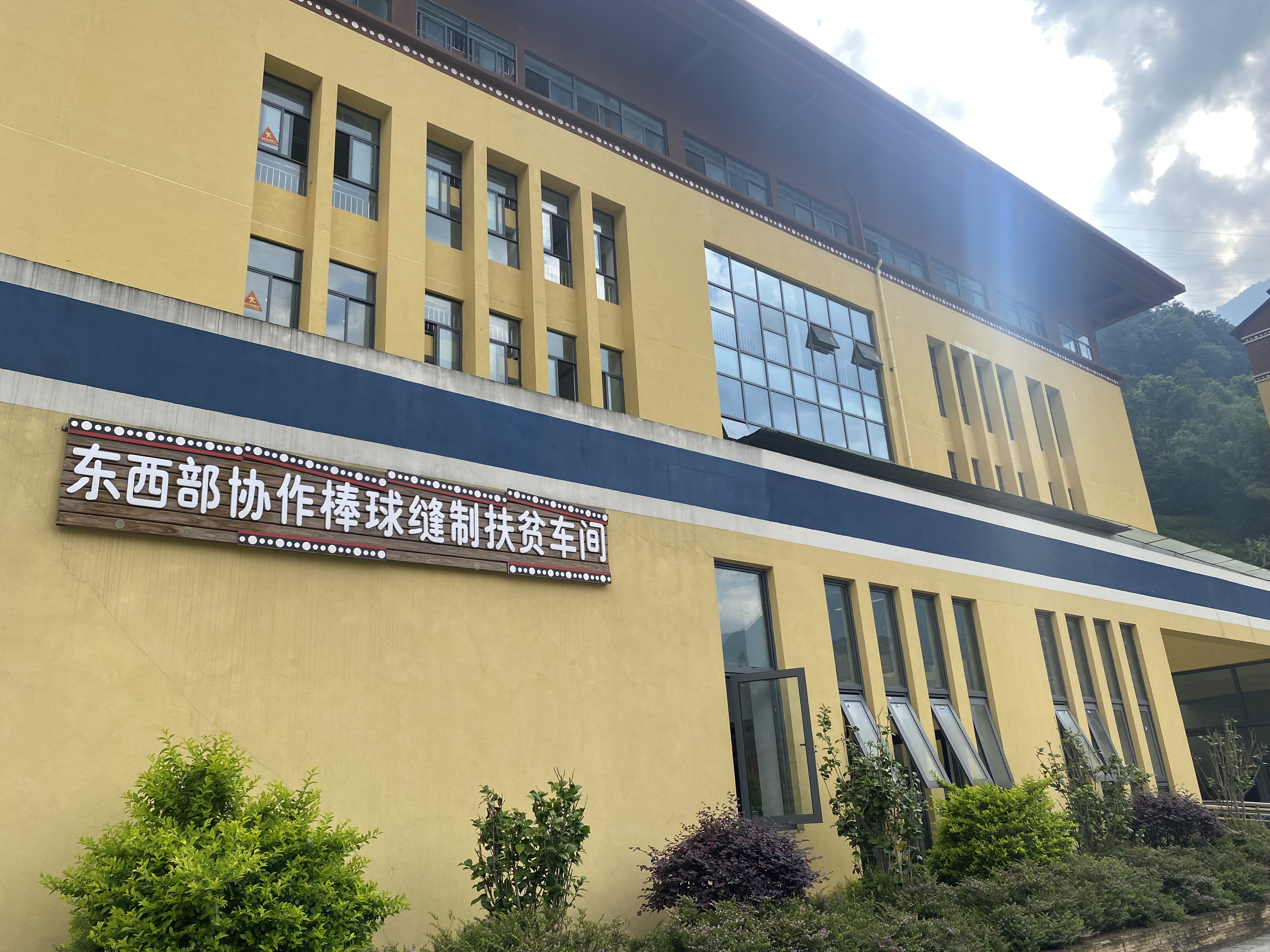
Baseball sewing poverty alleviation workshop in Jiangxi resettlement site in Fugong County

In November 2015, in order to prevent the occurrence of digital poverty alleviation and fraud in poverty alleviation work, the CCP Central Committee and the State Council established a strict assessment and evaluation system. The party and government leaders of the 22 provinces, autonomous regions and municipalities with heavy poverty alleviation tasks signed a "Poverty Alleviation Responsibility Letter" with the central government, which was signed at all levels to the grassroots level in the form of a military order. In 2016, the Chinese government announced that close to 10 million poor rural residents must be relocated due to the anti-poverty campaign, either due to living in areas that are designated for ecological conservation and thus must not be developed, officially classified as inhospitable or prone to natural disasters, or too far away from a main road. This led to the relocation of 9.6 million rural residents by 2020, At the end of December 2016, in his 2017 New Year's message, Xi Jinping called on everyone to "roll up their sleeves and work hard" and "win the battle against poverty." In February 2017, various parts of China conducted self-examination and self-correction of false poverty alleviation in 2016.

According to data from 2018, the number of people in poverty has decreased from 98.99 million in 2012 to 16.60 million in 2018, a total decrease of 82.39 million. The annual poverty reduction scale has been above 10 million for six consecutive years, and the poverty incidence rate has dropped from 10.2% to 1.7%. On 5 March 2019, Premier Li Keqiang proposed in the Government Work Report to fight a well-targeted battle against poverty. The focus will be on solving the outstanding problems faced in achieving Two No Worries and Three Guarantees, increasing the efforts to fight poverty in deep poverty areas such as the "three districts and three prefectures", and implementing protection measures for special poor people. In October 2019, the State Council established the National Poverty Alleviation Census Leading Group, with Vice Premier Hu Chunhua as the group leader, and Ning Jizhe, Gao Yu, Liu Yongfu, Guo Weimin, Luo Wen, and Cheng Lihua as deputy group leaders.

On 23 November 2020, the Guizhou Provincial People's Government announced that the last nine poor counties in the province had officially been removed from the title of "poor counties". Since then, all 832 national-level poor counties identified by the State Council of China were lifted out of poverty and removed from the title of poor counties, completing the national poverty alleviation goal.

=== Conclusion ===
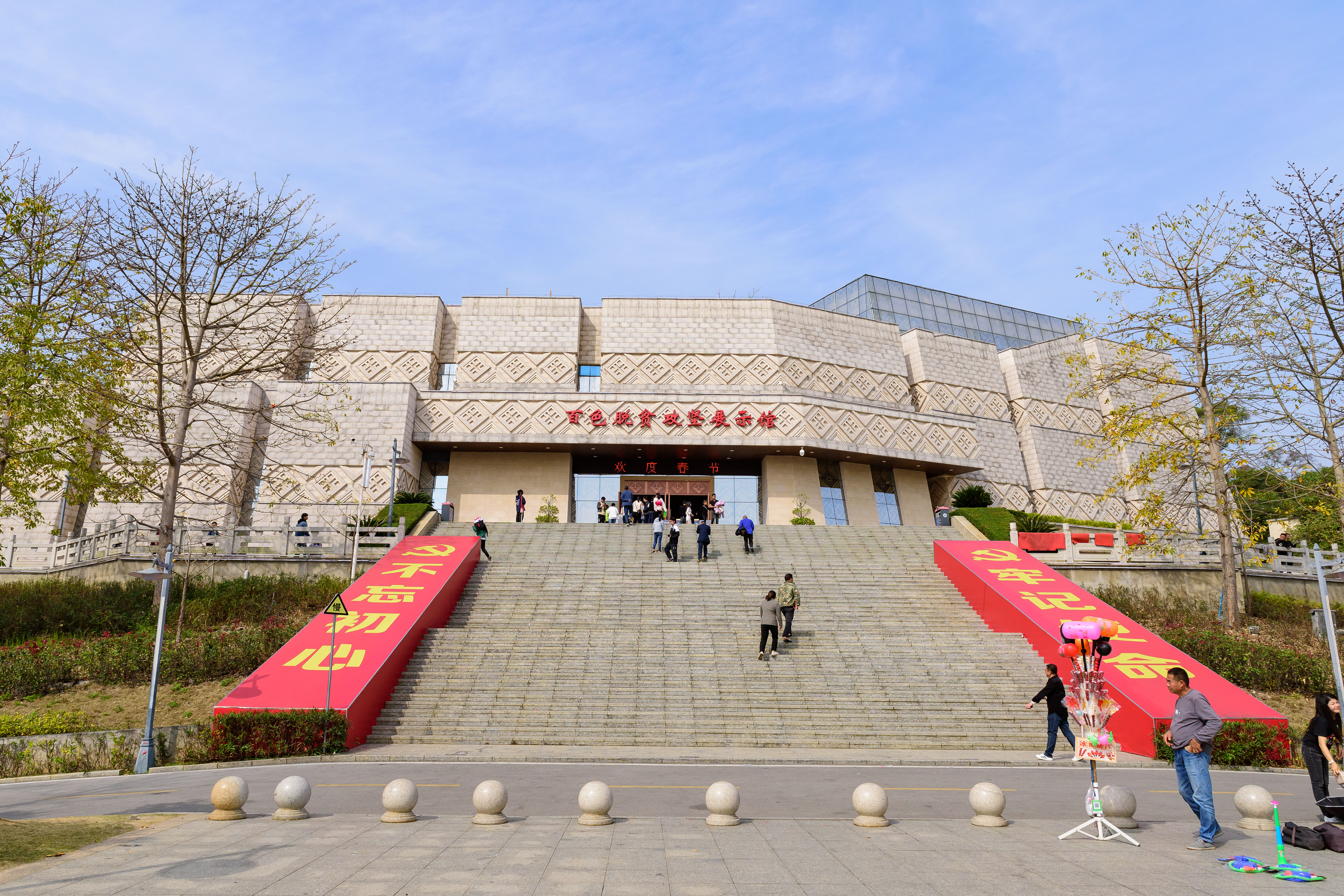
Baise Poverty Alleviation Exhibition Hall

On 3 December 2020, the Politburo Standing Committee held a meeting to listen to the summary and evaluation report on poverty alleviation. Xi stated at the meeting that "we have completed the poverty alleviation goals and tasks in the new era as scheduled." On 25 February 2021, the CCP Central Committee and the State Council held the National Poverty Alleviation Summary and Commendation Conference at the Great Hall of the People in Beijing. At the meeting, Xi declared that China's poverty alleviation battle had achieved "comprehensive victory". He said that under the current standards, 98.99 million rural poor people have all been lifted out of poverty, 832 poor counties have all been lifted out of poverty, 128,000 impoverished villages have all been removed from the list, regional overall poverty has been resolved, and the arduous task of eliminating absolute poverty has been completed. Additionally, the ratio of annual per capita disposable income in urban areas to rural areas fell from 2.88 to 2.5 from 2012 to 2021, while the Gini coefficient dropped from 43.7 in 2010 to 38.5 in 2021. On the same day, the Office of the Leading Group for Poverty Alleviation and Development of the State Council officially changed its name to the National Rural Revitalization Bureau. However, China's poor counties were required to undergo a five-year transition period from the date of their poverty alleviation, and mechanisms to prevent relapse into poverty and the onset of poverty still needed to be established and improved.

== Cadres ==
From August 2015 to June 2016, China mobilized nearly 2 million people to carry out the "review of the file registration" work to ensure that the people who should be lifted out of poverty were lifted out of poverty in a timely manner and that the people who should be lifted out of poverty were given strong support. In total, the campaign included 3 million CCP cadres that were picked by CCP units, the People's Liberation Army and universities at various levels, and 255,000 work teams. The cadres became party secretaries in villages and oversaw the implementation of the campaign at the local level. Academics Steve Tsang and Olivia Cheung write that bringing cadres from outside the localities greatly reduced the tendency of poverty alleviation money to be used for corruption or nepotism, while strengthening the Party throughout at the village-level. In March 2020, Xi described local cadres as:

We have grasped party-building as a means of poverty eradication .... [Thanks to their experience in the antipoverty campaign,] younger cadres in particular have come to understand the grassroots, learned how to work among the masses, and matured quickly through practice-based training. Grassroot cadres at poverty-stricken regions have demonstrated greater combativeness than others in preventing and controlling the COVID19 pandemic. Many village-based work teams [for poverty eradication] quickly pulled together to become pandemic control teams. Their impressive performance is inseparable from their experience in poverty eradication in the past few years.

== Special meetings ==
Xi Jinping held seven special meetings on the fight against poverty:

- On 13 February 2015, held a "Symposium on Poverty Alleviation and Prosperity in Old Revolutionary Base Areas" Yan'an, Shaanxi
- On 18 June 2015, held a symposium on "poverty alleviation in some provinces, autonomous regions and municipalities and economic and social development during the 13th Five-Year Plan period" in Guiyang, Guizhou
- On 20 July 2016, held a "East-West Poverty Alleviation Cooperation Symposium" in Yinchuan, Ningxia
- On 23 June 2017, held a "Symposium on Poverty Alleviation in Deeply Poverty-stricken Areas" in Taiyuan, Shanxi
- On 12 February 2018, held a symposium on “Fighting a Precision Poverty Alleviation Campaign” in Chengdu, Sichuan.
- On 16 April 2019, held a symposium on "solving outstanding issues of 'two no worries and three guarantees'" in Chongqing
- On 6 March 2020, held a symposium on “Winning the decisive battle against poverty” in Beijing

== Popular culture ==
At the end of March 2019, the State Administration of Radio, Film and Television issued the "Notice on Doing a Good Job in the Creation and Broadcasting of TV Dramas on Poverty Alleviation", requiring that from that day on, TV stations at all levels, especially satellite TV comprehensive channels, should increase their efforts in purchasing and scheduling TV dramas on poverty alleviation. At present, the State Administration of Radio, Film and Television has studied and determined 22 key TV dramas on poverty alleviation.
