= Gao Hongbin =

Gao Hongbin may refer to:

- Gao Hongbin (politician, born 1971) (Chinese: 高宏彬), former Communist Party Secretary of Fushun.
- Gao Hongbin (politician, born 1954) (Chinese: 高鸿宾), Vice Minister of the Ministry of Agriculture.
