= National Poverty Alleviation Summary and Commendation Conference =

- Native name: 全国脱贫攻坚总结表彰大会
- Date: 25 February 2021
- Location: Great Hall of the People, Beijing, China
- Motive: Conclusion of the battle against poverty
- Organised by: Chinese Communist Party; • Xi Jinping (General Secretary)
- Participants: Chinese Communist Party, Government of China

The National Poverty Alleviation Summary and Commendation Conference was a commendation conference of the People's Republic of China (PRC) held on the morning of February 25, 2021 at the Great Hall of the People in Beijing to conclude the battle against poverty campaign that started in 2015.

At the conference, awards were presented to the winners of the honorary title of National Poverty Alleviation Model, and commendations were given to the individuals and groups in the battle against poverty campaign. The conference was chaired by Premier Li Keqiang while Chinese Communist Party (CCP) General Secretary Xi Jinping delivered a speech.

== The conference ==
The National Poverty Alleviation Summary and Commendation Conference was held in the Great Hall of the People in Beijing on the morning of February 25, 2021. Premier Li Keqiang announced the start of the meeting. Afterwards, Wang Yang, the Chairman of the National Committee of the Chinese People's Political Consultative Conference, read out the "Decision of the CCP Central Committee and the State Council on Awarding the Honorary Title of National Poverty Alleviation Model". The decision mentioned that "after eight years of continuous struggle, poverty alleviation has achieved a comprehensive victory. Under the current standards, nearly 100 million rural poor people have all been lifted out of poverty, all poor counties have been lifted out of poverty, and the absolute poverty problem that has plagued the Chinese nation for thousands of years has been historically solved." "The honorary title of "National Poverty Alleviation Model" was awarded to 10 comrades including Mao Xianglin and 10 collectives including the Saihanba Mechanical Forest Farm in Hebei Province." Xi Jinping presented awards to the winners of the honorary title of National Poverty Alleviation Model.

Wang Yang read out the "Decision of the CCP Central Committee and the State Council on Commending Advanced Individuals and Groups in the National Poverty Alleviation Campaign", awarding the title of "National Advanced Individual in the National Poverty Alleviation Campaign" to 1,981 people including Compaly; and awarding the title of "National Advanced Group in the National Poverty Alleviation Campaign" to 1,501 groups including Beijing Shounong Supply Chain Management Co., Ltd. Xi and others presented awards to representatives of the commended advanced individuals and groups in the national poverty alleviation campaign. After the award ceremony, Xi delivered a keynote speech, listing the achievements of the poverty alleviation campaign, including the construction of roads, railways, power supply, Internet, housing and other aspects. He also commemorated the more than 1,800 people who died in the poverty alleviation campaign and praised their efforts and contributions. He also explained the funds used in the poverty alleviation campaign.

== Awards ==
=== National Model for Poverty Alleviation (Individual) ===
A total of 10 individuals were awarded the title of National Model for Poverty Alleviation:

- Mao Xianglin: Party branch secretary of Xiazhuang Village, Zhuxian Township, Wushan County, Chongqing
- Bai Jingying: Chairman of the Standing Committee of the People's Congress of Horqin Right Middle Banner, Xing'an League, Inner Mongolia Autonomous Region, head of the Special Promotion Group of the Mongolian Embroidery Industry in Horqin Right Middle Banner, and president of the Mongolian Embroidery Association
- Liu Hu: Deputy Party Secretary and director of the Water Conservancy Bureau of Jiashi County, Kashgar Prefecture, Xinjiang Uygur Autonomous Region
- Li Yu: Academician of the Chinese Academy of Engineering, Professor of Jilin Agricultural University
- Zhang Xiaojuan: Deputy director of the Poverty Alleviation Office of Zhouqu County, Gannan Tibetan Autonomous Prefecture, Gansu Province
- Zhang Guimei: Party branch secretary and principal of Huaping Girls' Senior High School in Lijiang City, Yunnan Province, and director of Huaping County Children's Welfare Institute
- Zhao Yafu: Researcher at Daizhuang Organic Agriculture Professional Cooperative, Tianwang Town, Jurong City, Jiangsu Province
- Jiang Shikun: Secretary of the Qinglong County Committee of Qianxinan Buyi and Miao Autonomous Prefecture, Guizhou Province
- Xia Sen: Former researcher of the Foreign Affairs Bureau of the Chinese Academy of Social Sciences
- Huang Wenxiu: The first secretary of Baini Village, Xinhua Town, Leye County, Guangxi Zhuang Autonomous Region, assigned by the Propaganda Department of Baise Municipal Committee.

=== National Model for Poverty Alleviation (Group) ===
A total of 10 units were awarded the title of National Model for Poverty Alleviation:

- Saihanba Mechanical Forest Farm, Hebei Province
- Dawan Village, Huashi Township, Jinzhai County, Anhui Province
- CCP Xiadang Township Committee of Shouning County, Fujian Province
- Yeping Township, Ruijin City, Jiangxi Province
- Shibadong Village, Shuanglong Town, Huayuan County, Hunan Province
- Sanhe Village, Sanchahe Town, Zhaojue County, Liangshan Yi Autonomous Prefecture, Sichuan Province
- Rural Power Department of State Grid Tibet Electric Power Co., Ltd.
- Haojiaqiao Village, Zhangjiabian Town, Suide County, Shaanxi Province
- Banyan Village, Wushi Town, Huzhu Tu Autonomous County, Haidong City, Qinghai Province
- Minning Town, Yongning County, Ningxia Hui Autonomous Region
