= 1879 Gansu earthquake =

Deadly earthquake in China in 1879

- Location within Gansu Location within China
- UTC time: 1879-06-30
- Local date: July 1, 1879
- Magnitude: 8.0 M_{s}
- Epicenter: 33.2°N 104.7°E
- Areas affected: China
- Max. intensity: MMI XI (Extreme)
- Landslides: Many
- Foreshocks: Yes
- Casualties: 22,000

The 1879 Gansu earthquake occurred at about 04:00 local time on 1 July. It had an estimated magnitude of 8.0 on the M_{s} scale and a maximum perceived intensity of XI (Extreme) on the Mercalli intensity scale. The epicenter was in Wudu District in southern Gansu, close to the border with Sichuan. It caused widespread damage and killed an estimated 22,000 people.

== Tectonic setting ==
The area of the earthquake lies just to the north of the eastern end of the East Kunlun Fault, a major left-lateral strike-slip fault zone that forms the boundary between the Bayan Har block, to the south, and the Eastern Kunlun–Qaidam block to the north, two parts of the Tibetan Plateau. As a whole the Tibetan Plateau is spreading to the east. Where it reaches the Sichuan Basin, which overlies the Yangtze plate, a thick and less deformable part of the lithosphere, a series of southwest–northeast trending thrust faults have formed, known collectively as the Longmenshan Fault, the rupture of which was responsible for the 2008 Sichuan earthquake.

== Earthquake ==
The earthquake was preceded by foreshocks in the few days before the mainshock.

The meizoseismal area extends 70 km in a WSW-ENE direction and is 30 km across. The earthquake may have been caused by movement on the WSW-ENE trending Fanjiaba-Linjiang Fault. This fault correlates well with a 30 km long lineament seen on satellite images. The similarly oriented Hanan-Daoqizi-Maopola fault zone has also been proposed as a likely candidate. A rupture extent of 190 km has been estimated for this earthquake with a slip of 7.2 m.

The earthquake triggered many landslides and caused the formation of several natural dams 40 to 120 m in height.

== Damage ==
In Wudu city there were a total of 9,881 casualties, with many houses damaged and about half of the livestock killed. Large parts of the city walls were badly damaged and 60 temples were destroyed at Wanshou Hill. In Wenxian and the surrounding villages 10,792 people were killed. Many homes were destroyed and the city walls collapsed.

== See also ==
- List of earthquakes in China
- List of historical earthquakes
