= Wudu, Longnan =

Wudu 武都区
- District
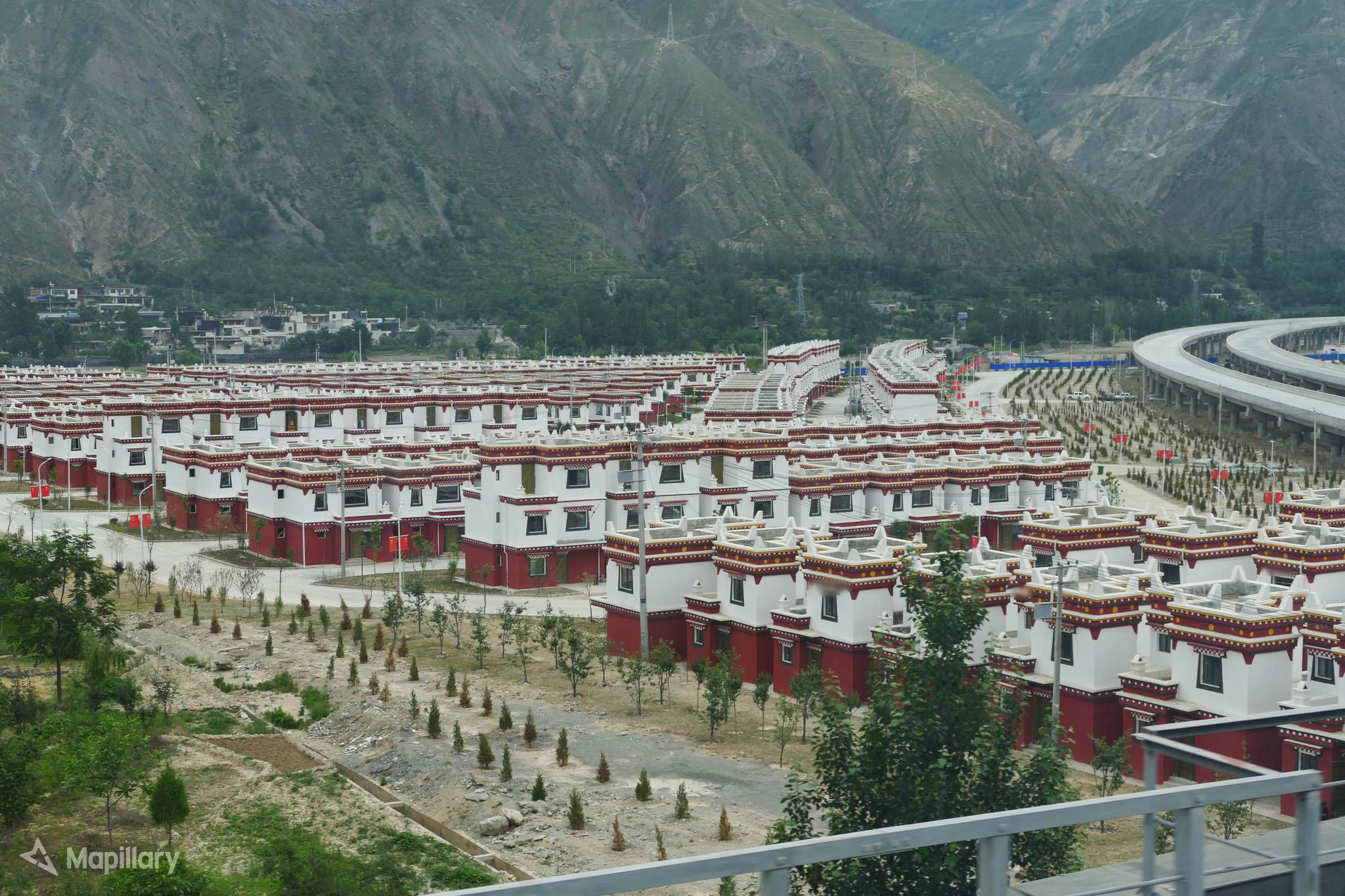
- Tibetan-style homes in Pingya, Wudu

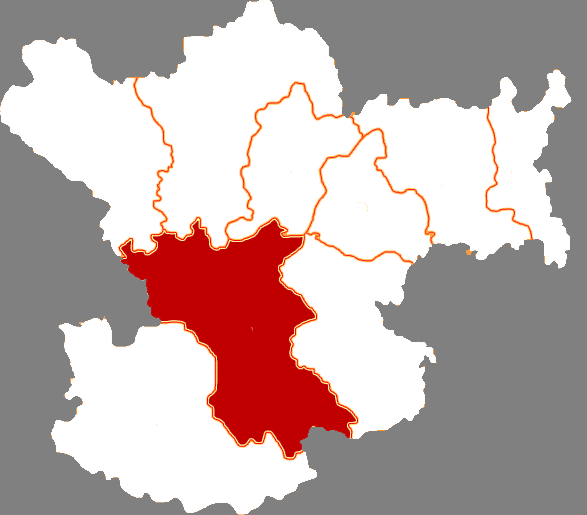
- Wudu in Longnan

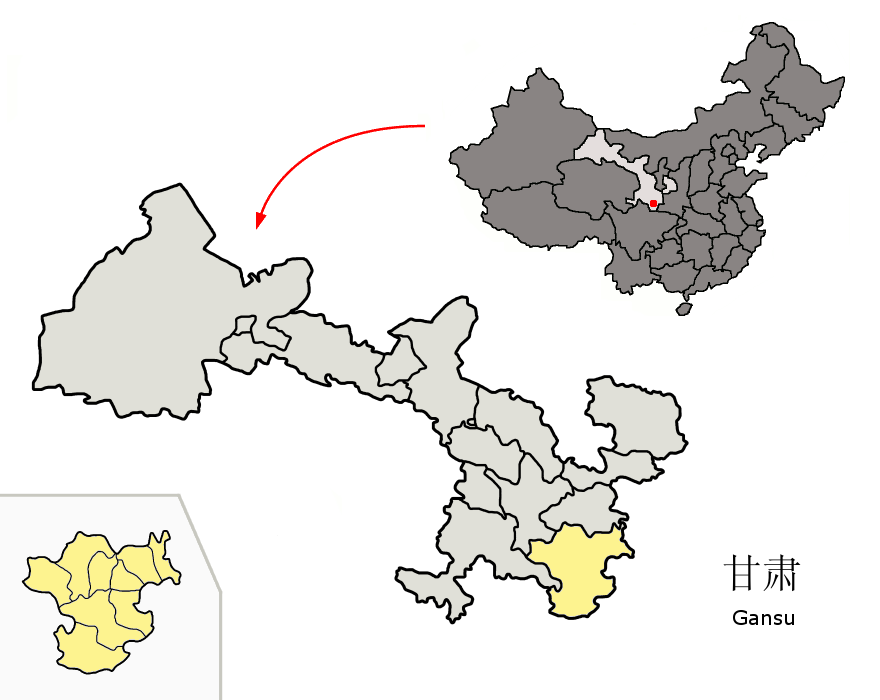
- Longnan in Gansu

- Location in Gansu
- Coordinates: 33°22′13″N 104°57′37″E
- Country: China
- Province: Gansu
- Prefecture-level city: Longnan
- District seat: Zhonglou Subdistrict

Area
  - Total: 4,683 km^{2} (1,808 sq mi)

Population (2020 census)
  - Total: 546,616
  - Density: 116.7/km^{2} (302.3/sq mi)
- Time zone: UTC+8 (China Standard)
- Postal code: 746000
- Website: www.gslnwd.gov.cn

Wudu, Longnan

Chinese name
- Simplified Chinese: 武都区
- Traditional Chinese: 武都區
Transcriptions
Standard Mandarin
- Hanyu Pinyin: Wǔdū Qū
other Mandarin
- Xiao'erjing: وُدُو کِیُوِ

Tibetan name
- Tibetan: བོད་ཏོག་ཆུས།
Transcriptions
- Wylie: bod tog chus
- Tibetan Pinyin: Woidog Qü

Wudu District (Chinese: 武都区) is a district and the political and cultural center of Longnan, Gansu province, China. It borders the provinces of Shaanxi province and Sichuan to the southeast. It has a population of 546,616 as of the 2020 census, of which a portion lives in the urban area.

Located along the Bailong River near the borders with Sichuan and Shaanxi province, it has been the site of numerous historic battles. A settlement has existed at the current district seat since at least 448. It was named Wuzhou (武州) in 572 and Jiezhou in 892. From 1260 it was part of Shaanxi province, becoming part of Gansu in 1729. In 1913, Wudu County was established. The current district was established from Wudu County in 2004.

The epicenter of the 1879 Gansu earthquake was located in the district.

Wudu is a tourist destination in Gansu, receiving over 2 million tourists in 2016. The Wanxiang cave is located 10 km from the district seat. Its agricultural output includes olive cultivation, traditional Chinese medicine crops and Sichuan pepper.

== Administrative divisions ==
Wudu District is divided into 4 subdistricts, 26 towns, 8 townships, and 2 ethnic townships.

Subdistricts

- Zhongluo Subdistrict (钟楼街道)
- Jishiba Subdistrict (吉石坝街道)
- Jiangbei Subdistrict (江北街道)
- Jiangnan Subdistrict (江南街道)

Towns

- Chengguan (城关镇)
- Anhua (安化镇)
- Dongjiang (东江镇)
- Liangshui (两水镇)
- Hanwang (汉王镇)
- Luotang (洛塘镇)
- Jiaogong (角弓镇)
- Majie (马街镇)
- Sanhe (三河镇)
- Ganquan (甘泉镇)
- Yulong (鱼龙镇)
- Pipa (琵琶镇)
- Waina (外纳镇)
- Maying (马营镇)
- Bolin (柏林镇)
- Yaozhai (姚寨镇)
- Foya (佛崖镇)
- Shimen (石门镇)
- Wuma (五马镇)
- Yuhe (裕河镇)
- Hanlin (汉林镇)
- Jugan (桔柑镇)
- Longxing (隆兴镇)
- Huangping (黄坪镇)
- Wuku (五库镇)
- Sancang (三仓镇)

Townships

- Puchi Township (蒲池乡)
- Chiba Township (池坝乡)
- Longba Township (龙坝乡)
- Longfeng Township (龙凤乡)
- Yuhuang Township (玉皇乡)
- Guohe Township (郭河乡)
- Fengxiang Township (枫相乡)
- Yuezhao Township (月照乡)

Ethnic townships

- Pingya Tibetan Ethnic Township (坪垭藏族乡) (Tibetan: ཕིང་ཡག་བོད་རིགས་ཤང་།(Wylie: phing yag bod-rigs shang, ZWPY: Pingyag Poirig Xang))
- Moba Tibetan Ethnic Township (磨坝藏族乡)

== Transport ==
- China National Highway 212
- China National Highway 345
- G75 Lanzhou–Haikou Expressway
- G8513 Pingliang–Mianyang Expressway
- Chongqing–Lanzhou railway

== See also ==
- List of administrative divisions of Gansu
