= Pingya =

Pingya 坪垭藏族乡 ཕིང་ཡག་བོད་རིགས་ཞང་།
- Ethnic township
- Pingya Tibetan Ethnic Township
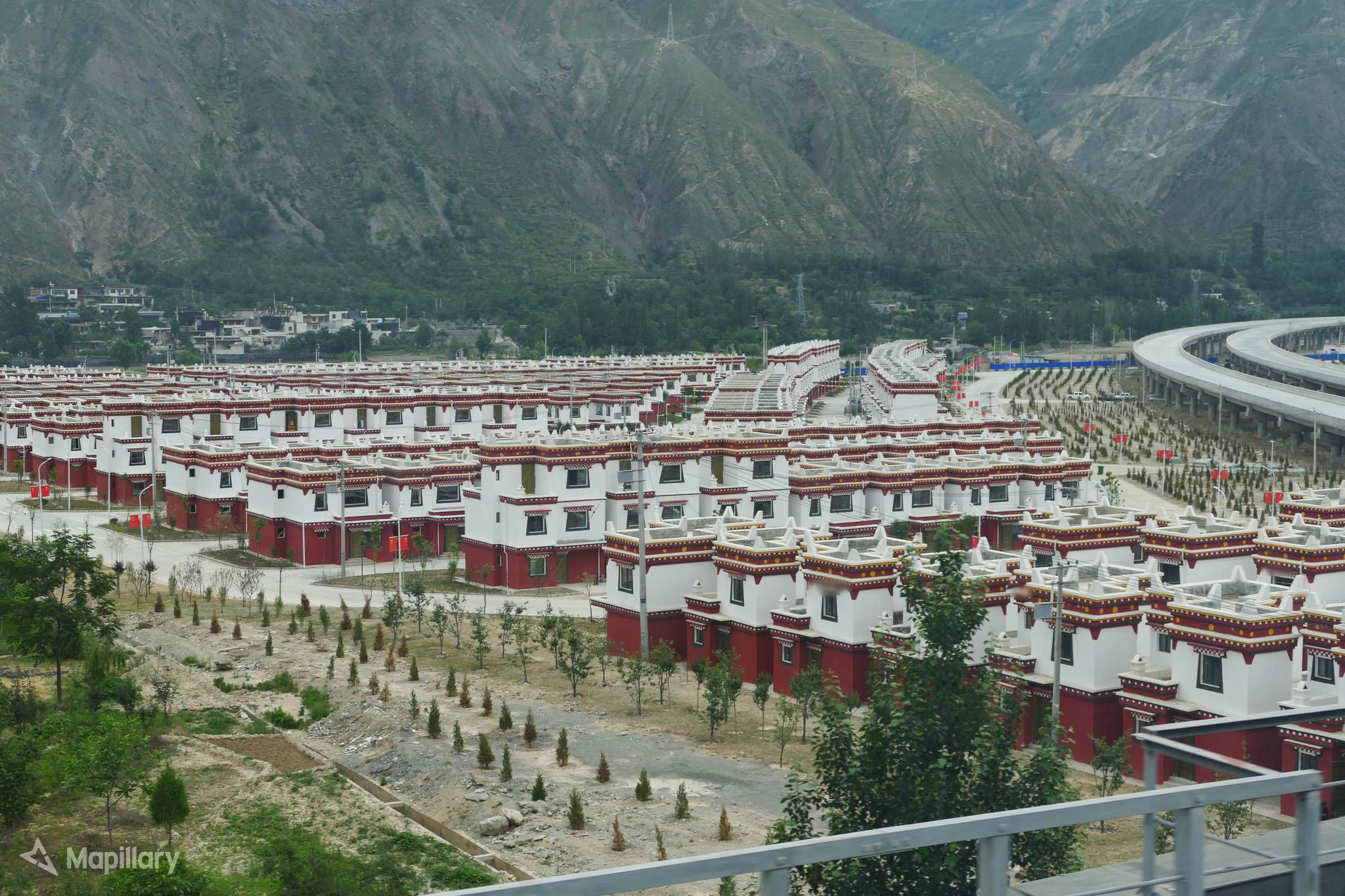

- Location within Gansu
- Coordinates: 33.5228691°N 104.6805146°E
- Country: China
- Province: Gansu
- Prefecture-level city: Longnan
- District: Wudu
- Highest elevation: 3,200 m (10,500 ft)

Population (2018)
  - Total: 6,350

Pingya is a township of Wudu District, Longnan, China. It has a population of 6350 as of 2020, divided over 9 villages and 18 residential communities. Between 2016 and 2018, 5,731 people of the township were resettled from a mountaintop to the Bailong River valley as part of poverty alleviation efforts, to improve transportation and available amenities.
