= Office of the State Council Leading Group of Poverty Alleviation and Development =

The Office of the State Council Leading Group of Poverty Alleviation and Development (Chinese: 国务院扶贫开发领导小组办公室), or the State Council Office of Poverty Alleviation (Chinese: 国务院扶贫办) for short, is primarily responsible for the formulation of laws and regulations, guidelines and policies, and plans for poverty alleviation and development.

It is also responsible for the review and approval of plans for the allocation of central poverty alleviation funds, the organization of surveys, research, and work appraisals, the coordination and resolution of significant issues in poverty alleviation and development, the investigation and guidance of poverty alleviation and development throughout the country, and the top-level design of major strategic policies and measures for poverty alleviation and development. It has been abolished in 2021.

== History ==
=== Leading Group of "Three xi" Region Agricultural Construction ===
On December 22, 1982, the General Office of the State Council issued a notice (General Office of the State Council issued [1982] No. 85) regarding the establishment of the "three xi" (Hexi, Dingxi, Xihaigu) region agricultural construction leading group. The notice stated that the State Council had decided to establish the "three xi" (Hexi, Dingxi, Xihaigu) regional agricultural construction leading group in order to expedite the construction of the Gansu Hexi Corridor commodity grain base and transform the face of poverty in Gansu. The daily work was managed by the Leading Group's office, which was situated in the Ministry of Agriculture, Animal Husbandry, and Fishery.

The State Council Leading Group on Economic Development of Impoverished Areas was established on May 16, 1986, by the Notice of the General Office of the State Council on the Establishment of the State Council Leading Group on Economic Development of Impoverished Areas (Guo Ban Fa [1986] No. 39). Zhu Rong (Chinese: 朱荣) served as the group's chairman. Yang Yongzhe (Chinese: 杨雍哲) concurrently served as the director of the Office, which was established under the State Council Leading Group Office of Economic Development of Impoverished Areas ("Development Office") and is responsible for the day-to-day operations of the Ministry of Agriculture, Animal Husbandry, and Fishery.

On July 18, 1988, the State Council issued "the General Office of the State Council on the adjustment of the State Council Leading Group of economic development of impoverished areas" (State Office of the State Council issued [1988] No. 30). This decision resulted in the merger of the State Council Leading Group of economic development of impoverished areas and the "three xi" region of the Leading Group of Agricultural Construction. Zhu Rong presided over the day-to-day work of the State Council Leading Group for Economic Development of Impoverished Areas, and Li Zhong (Chinese: 黎中) was divided into responsibility for the "three xi" region. The "Development Office" was established in the Ministry of Agriculture by the State Council Leading Group of Economic Development in Impoverished Areas. Yang Yongzhe concurrently served as the office's director. Simultaneously, Liu Guangzu (Chinese: 刘光祖) was appointed as the superintendent of the "three xi" regional office, which is co-located with the Development Office.

=== State Council Leading Group of Poverty Alleviation and Development ===
On September 17, 1993, the State Council Leading Group of Economic Development of Impoverished Areas issued "the General Office of the State Council on adjusting the name and members of the State Council Leading Group of Economic Development of Impoverished Areas" (State Office of the State Council [1993] No. 62). The group was renamed the State Council Leading Group of Poverty Alleviation and Development. The name was officially altered to the State Council Leading Group of Poverty Alleviation and Development on December 28, 1993, and the Office of the State Council Leading Group on Poverty Alleviation and Development was established under it.

The Circular of the General Office of the State Council on the Adjustment of the Members of the State Council Leading Group of Poverty Alleviation and Development (Guo Ban Fa [1998] No. 24) was issued on May 18, 1998. The circular stipulated that "the Leading Group of Poverty Alleviation and Development of the State Council shall establish a distinct office in the Ministry of Agriculture, and Gao Hongbin serves as the office's director."

On February 25, 2002, the Central Committee of the Chinese Communist Party issued the "General Office of the State Council on the issuance of the State Council Leading Group Office of Poverty Alleviation and Development of the function of the configuration of the internal structure and staffing provisions of the notice" (Guo Ban Fa [2002] No. 17). The State Council approved the former Ministry of Agriculture within the Office of the State Council Leading Group Office of Poverty Alleviation and Development of the Ministry of Agriculture, set up a separate and upgraded to the level of vice-ministerial level for the State Council Leading Group of Poverty Alleviation and Development.

The Ministry of Agriculture is responsible for the specific work, while the National Government Offices Administration manages the logistical affairs and retirement expenses of the Office of the State Council Leading Group of Poverty Alleviation and Development. The Foreign Capital Project Management Center of the State Council Leading Group Office of Poverty Alleviation and Development, the National Training Center for Cadres in Poverty-stricken Areas, and the China Poverty Alleviation and Development Service Center, which were previously under the management of the Ministry of Agriculture, have been transferred to the Office of the State Council Leading Group Office of Poverty Alleviation and Development. These institutions were directly under the State Council Leading Group Office of Poverty Alleviation and Development.

The National Rural Revitalization Administration, a state bureau under the administration of the State Council's ministries and commissions, was established in January 2021 by the State Council to coordinate the specific work of promoting the rural revitalization strategy throughout the country. The Ministry of Agriculture and Rural Affairs is responsible for the bureau's operation. In accordance with this, the State Council Leading Group Office of Poverty Alleviation and Development was abolished.

== Leader ==
Director

- Cheng Jinrui (Chinese: 程金瑞)
- Liu Guangzu (deputy director of the Development Office of the State Council)
- Yang Yongzhe (1986–1990, Director of the Development Office of the State Council)
- Yang Zhong (Chinese: 杨钟)
- Gao Hongbin (Chinese: 高鸿宾, April 1996 – 2003)
- Liu Jian (2003–2007)
- Fan Xiaojian (2007 - November 21, 2013)
- Liu Yongfu (Chinese: 刘永富, November 21, 2013 - 2021)

Deputy Director

- Yang Gui (December 1982 - ?, deputy director of the "three xi" Regional Office)
- Liu Guangzu (1986-? Deputy Director of the Development Office of the State Council)
- Zhang Mingyu (Chinese: 张铭羽, deputy director, Development Office of the State Council)
- Gao Hongbin (? -April 1996, deputy director of the Development Office of the State Council and the State Council Office of Poverty Alleviation; 2003–2007, deputy director of the State Council Office of Poverty Alleviation)
- Jiang Xiaohua (? -2003)
- Wang Guoliang (September 2003 - 2014)
- Zheng Wenkai (2007 - November 21, 2016)
- Ou Qingping (2014 - 2021)
- Hung Tin Wan (2014 - 2021)
- Chen Zhigang (November 21, 2016 - 2021)
- Xia Gengsheng (2018–2021)

== See also ==
- China Foundation for Poverty Alleviation
- Targeted Poverty Alleviation
