= National-level poor county =

Chinese government designation

National-level poor county (Chinese: 国家级贫困县; pinyin: Guójiājí Pínkùn Xiàn) was a specific title for county-level administrative regions in China that implemented economic support against poverty. Their qualifications were required to be approved by the Office of the Leading Group for Poverty Alleviation and Development of the State Council. The approval process was carried out four times in 1986, 1994, 2001 and 2012.

There were a total of 832 poor counties in China. On November 23, 2020, all national-level impoverished counties in China were lifted out of poverty as part of the battle against poverty, and the national-level impoverished county assistance system was officially abolished. In addition to national-level poor counties, there are also provincial-level poor counties and interspersed poor areas, which are relatively difficult areas identified by provinces and not included in the national poverty alleviation plan.

== Qualifications ==
The standard for defining national poor counties was based on the average annual net income of local residents. According to the standard announced by the Office of the Leading Group for Poverty Alleviation and Development in China in 2012, counties with an average annual income of less than renminbi 2,300 were classified as national poor counties, while the standard is lowered accordingly for ethnic minority areas and old revolutionary base areas. National poor counties were mainly concentrated in the central and western regions, and are mostly concentrated in old revolutionary base areas, ethnic minority areas, and border areas (usually collectively referred to as "old, young, border, and poor" areas). The standard has changed over time, and some counties have also withdrawn from the scope of national support. Ethnic autonomous regions have different assessment standards and are called national poverty alleviation key counties in ethnic autonomous regions. In March 2012, the State Council issued the 2012 edition of "Outline of China's Rural Poverty Alleviation and Development", which listed 341 poor counties in ethnic autonomous regions.

When poor counties were first identified in 1986, 331 were identified; by the first adjustment in 1994, the number had increased to 592. After the second adjustment in 2001, poor counties were renamed key counties for national poverty alleviation and development, and all 33 key counties in the east were transferred to the central and western regions. However, the total number of key counties remained unchanged at 592. In the third adjustment in 2011, with similar geographical locations, climate environments, and poverty-causing factors were identified as concentrated and contiguous special poor counties. Among them, 440 counties were also among the 592 poor counties. Excluding the overlapping parts, there were 832 poor counties in the country.

According to the 2006 standards, 592 national-level impoverished counties were distributed in 21 provincial-level administrative regions across China, with Yunnan having the highest number, followed by Shaanxi, Guizhou and Gansu. 341 ethnic autonomous region impoverished counties were distributed in 17 provincial-level administrative regions across China, with the Tibet Autonomous Region having the highest number, followed by Yunnan and Guizhou. After the final adjustment in 2011, 832 impoverished counties (including 592 national key counties and 680 counties in 14 contiguous impoverished areas) were distributed in 22 provinces. Among them: 88 in Yunnan, 74 in the Tibet Autonomous Region, 66 in Sichuan, 66 in Guizhou, 58 in Gansu, 56 in Shaanxi, 45 in Hebei, 42 in Qinghai, 40 in Hunan, 38 in Henan, 36 in Shanxi, 33 in Guangxi, 32 in Xinjiang, 31 in Inner Mongolia, 28 in Hubei, 24 in Jiangxi, 20 in Heilongjiang, 20 in Anhui, 14 in Chongqing, 8 in Jilin, 8 in Ningxia, and 5 in Hainan. In 2015, about one in every three county was an impoverished county. There were no impoverished counties in nine provinces (municipalities), namely Beijing, Tianjin, Shanghai, Liaoning, Shandong, Guangdong, Fujian, Jiangsu and Zhejiang. However, this did not mean that there were no poor people.

== Policies ==
National-level poor counties were to be given priority in the development of industrialization by local governments at all levels. They received central government poverty alleviation funds, and the central government will also carry out poverty alleviation in various ways. For example, the more developed eastern regions provided counterpart support to the western regions, which was called "East-West Poverty Alleviation Cooperation"; and carry out labor transfer training, which was called the "Rain and Dew Plan". Some large enterprises, schools and public welfare organizations also gave priority to various support to poor counties accordingly, which was called "social poverty alleviation". At the same time, national-level poor counties also conducted international exchanges with many governments of developing countries to learn from each other's experience in poverty alleviation and prosperity. Students in impoverished areas also received preferential policies from the state to encourage knowledge poverty alleviation.

=== List of national poor counties that have been declared out of poverty ===
On February 26, 2017, Jinggangshan City in Jiangxi was the first in the country to be lifted out of poverty; on March 27 of the same year, Lankao County in Henan became the second key county to be lifted out of poverty. Together with the 26 counties announced on November 1, 2017, a total of 28 counties were lifted out of poverty that year. On August 17, 2018, another 40 counties were announced to have been lifted out of poverty. By the end of the year, according to data released on the official website of the State Council Leading Group Office of Poverty Alleviation and Development, a total of 125 counties had been lifted out of poverty. By the end of September 2019, 436 of the 832 impoverished counties had been lifted out of poverty. As of May 17, 2020, there were still 52 impoverished counties, 2,707 impoverished villages (originally 128,000 impoverished villages), and 5.51 million impoverished people in China who had not yet been lifted out of poverty.

As of November 23, 2020, all national-level poor counties in 22 provinces have been lifted out of poverty. On December 29, 2020, the Central Rural Work Conference of the Chinese Communist Party decided to establish a five-year transition period for counties that have escaped poverty from the date of their poverty alleviation.
