= China Foundation for Poverty Alleviation =

Chinese-based international humanitarian organization

- Founded: March 1989; 37 years ago
- Purpose: Healthcare, Education, Livelihood, Disaster Relief
- Location: Beijing, China
- Region served: China, Africa, Asia, Latin America
- Key people: Wenkai Zheng: President; Wenkui Liu: Secretary General and Vice President
- Website: Official website

China Foundation for Poverty Alleviation (CFPA) (Chinese: 中国扶贫基金会) is a nongovernmental charitable organization in Beijing, China, registered under the Chinese Ministry of Civil Affairs in 1989 and professionally supervised by the State Council Leading Group Office of Poverty Alleviation and Development.

== Poverty alleviation and development programs ==
=== Ecuador: Ecuadorian earthquake disaster relief ===
On April 17, 2016, 7:58 am, Ecuador was rocked by a 7.8-magnitude earthquake with an epicenter located at 0.371°N 79.940°W 0.371, 19.2 kilometers below ground. In the immediate aftermath, CFPA conducted damage assessment, and launched the Ecuador post-quake humanitarian relief operation. CFPA leveraged its expertise by dispatching humanitarian workers to Ecuador to assist in post-quake relief efforts from the 19th to 30 April 2016. Accompanying them was a humanitarian team sent by Pearl Humanitarian Rescue Institution (PHR). Both organizations jointly undertook 11 days' relief operations across 9 quake sites during which we committed 45 workers and 190 man hours to humanitarian relief and rescue efforts with assistance from local volunteers. Alongside the UN international and local NGOs, the local authorities, Chinese firms in Ecuador, and the Chinese diaspora, CFPA conducted medical patrols, first aid and materiel procurement, undertook tasks in disinfection and disease prevention, and supplied clean food water in a series of operations addressing the immediate humanitarian needs of quake-struck communities. Materiel relief provided was valued at close to US$160,000, and directly benefited over 10,000 quake victims.
