= Changzhi College =

College in Changzhi, China

Changzhi University (Chinese: 长治学院) is a full-time undergraduate publicly-run provincial ordinary college of higher learning in the People's Republic of China, located in the urban area of Changzhi City, Shanxi Province.

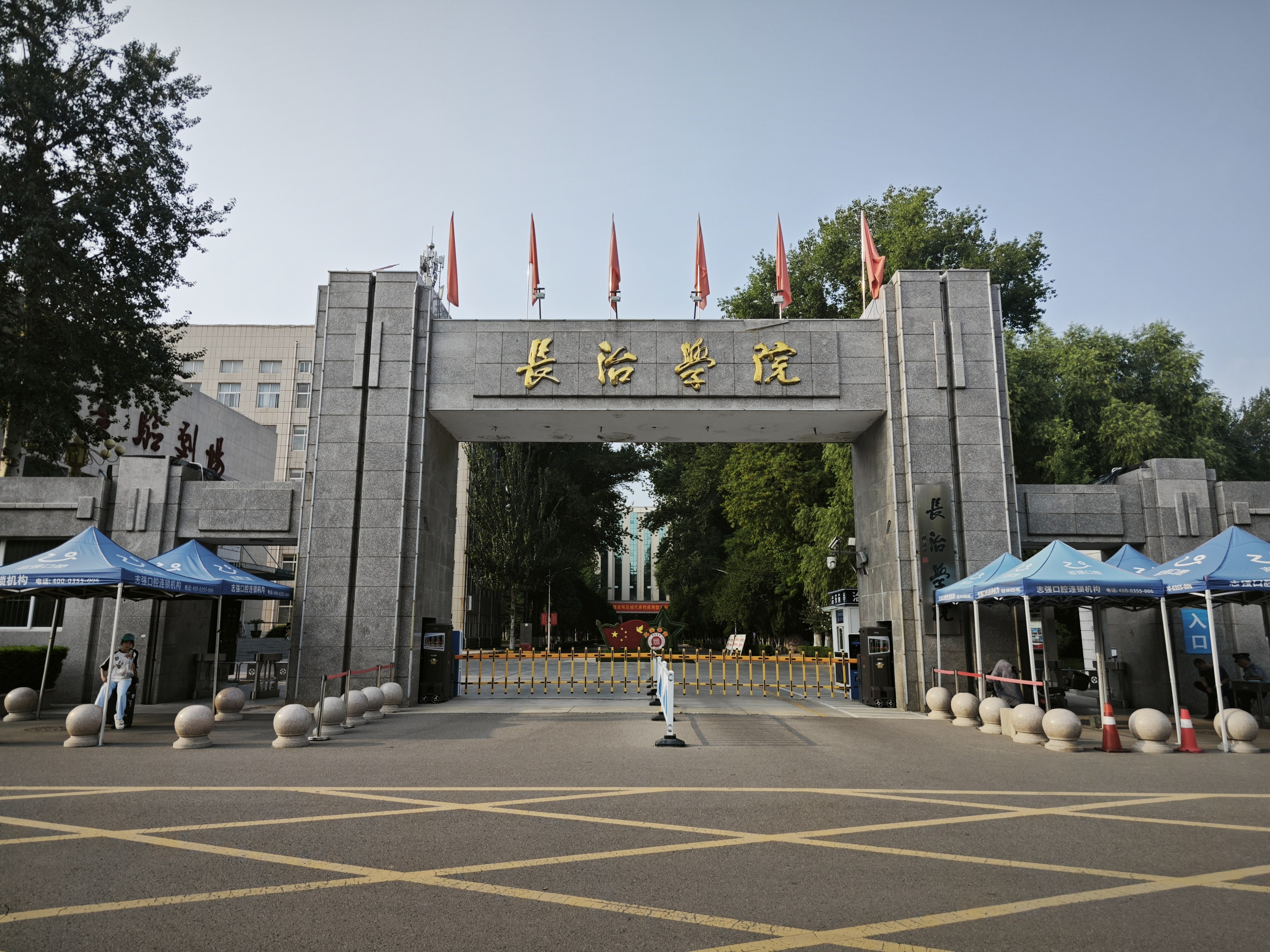
The gate of Changzhi University
