= Two No Worries and Three Guarantees =

Chinese Communist Party campaign

The Two No Worries and Three Guarantees (Chinese: 两不愁三保障; pinyin: Liǎngbùchóu sānbǎozhàng) were the overall goals of the People's Republic of China's battle against poverty campaign during the 13th Five-Year Plan period.

== History ==
In November 2011, General Secretary of the Chinese Communist Party Hu Jintao convened a central poverty alleviation and development work conference in Beijing to deploy a ten-year poverty alleviation and development work plan. He said out that by 2020, the central government would steadily achieve the goal of ensuring that the poverty alleviation targets have no worries about food and clothing, and guarantee their compulsory education, basic medical care, and housing. In December of the same year, the CCP Central Committee and the State Council issued the Outline for Rural Poverty Alleviation and Development in China (2011-2020). The "two no worries and three guarantees" were targeted at the poor and are part of the goal of achieving a well -off society in all respects by 2020.

In the Government Work Report, Premier Li Keqiang stated that "in 2019, we will fight a well-targeted battle against poverty. We will focus on resolving outstanding issues facing the realization of the 'two no worries and three guarantees' and intensify efforts to alleviate poverty in the 'three districts and three prefectures' and other deeply impoverished areas." From 15 to 17 April 2019, General Secretary Xi Jinping visited Chongqing and presided over a symposium on resolving outstanding issues of the 'two no worries and three guarantees' on the afternoon of 16 April, aiming to study and resolve outstanding issues.

== Definition ==
"Two no worries" means no worries about food and clothing; "three guarantees" means compulsory education, basic medical care, and housing security are guaranteed. To meet the first target, local governments were required to raise their per capita income to above the rural poverty line of ¥4,000 yuan. To meet the second target, local governments were required to cover their school fees, significantly subsidize the cost of their annual health insurance, and provide safe permanent structures for housing them.
