= Gao Hongbin (politician, born 1971) =

Chinese politician

- 高宏彬

Communist Party Secretary of Fushun
- In office June 2016 – September 2018
- Preceded by: Wang Guifen
- Succeeded by: Lai He

Communist Party Secretary of Benxi
- In office June 2015 – June 2016
- Preceded by: Wang Shiwei
- Succeeded by: Cui Fenglin

Mayor of Benxi
- In office February 2012 – June 2015
- Preceded by: Wang Shiwei
- Succeeded by: Cui Fenglin

Personal details
- Born: October 1971 (age 54–55) Penglai, Shandong, China
- Party: Chinese Communist Party (expelled in 2019)
- Education: Northeastern University; La Trobe University

Gao Hongbin (Chinese: 高宏彬; pinyin: Gāo Hóngbīn; born October 1971) is a Chinese politician who spent his entirely career in northeast China's Liaoning province. He was investigated by the Central Commission for Discipline Inspection in December 2018. Previously he served as head of the United Front Work Department of the Chinese Communist Party's Liaoning Provincial Committee.

== Early life and education ==
Gao was born in Penglai, Shandong in October 1971. He entered Northeastern University in September 1990, majoring in foundry at the Department of Materials Science and Engineering, where he graduated in July 1996.

== Career ==
After university, he became an official in Dongling District of Shenyang, capital of northeast China's Liaoning province. He served as deputy magistrate of Faku County in September 2002, and four years later promoted to the Magistrate position. He served as general director of Assistance Program for Xinjiang briefly. He served as Chinese Communist Party Deputy Committee Secretary of Benxi from January 2012 to June 2015, and CCP Committee Secretary, the top political position in the city, from June 2015 to June 2016. In June 2016, he was appointed CCP Committee Secretary of Fushun, he remained in that position until September 2018, when he was transferred to Shenyang and appointed head of the United Front Work Department of the CCP Liaoning Provincial Committee.

== Downfall ==
On December 11, 2018, he has been placed under investigation for serious violations of laws and regulations by the Central Commission for Discipline Inspection (CCDI), the CCP's internal disciplinary body, and the National Supervisory Commission, the highest anti-corruption agency of China.

On June 6, 2019, his alleged crimes have also been transferred to prosecutors for further review. He was detained on June 19. On December 15, he was expelled from the CCP and dismissed from public office.

Government offices
| Preceded by Wang Shiwei (王世伟) | Mayor of Benxi; 2012–2015 | Succeeded by Cui Fenglin (崔枫林) |
Party political offices
| Preceded by Wang Shiwei (王世伟) | Communist Party Secretary of Benxi; 2015–2016 | Succeeded by Cui Fenglin (崔枫林) |
| Preceded by Wang Guifen (王桂芬) | Communist Party Secretary of Fushun; 2016–2018 | Succeeded by Lai He (来鹤) |
