= Targeted Poverty Alleviation =

Anti-poverty campaign in China

- Simplified Chinese: 精准扶贫
- Traditional Chinese: 精準扶貧
- Hanyu Pinyin: Jīngzhǔn fúpín
Transcriptions
Standard Mandarin
- Hanyu Pinyin: Jīngzhǔn fúpín

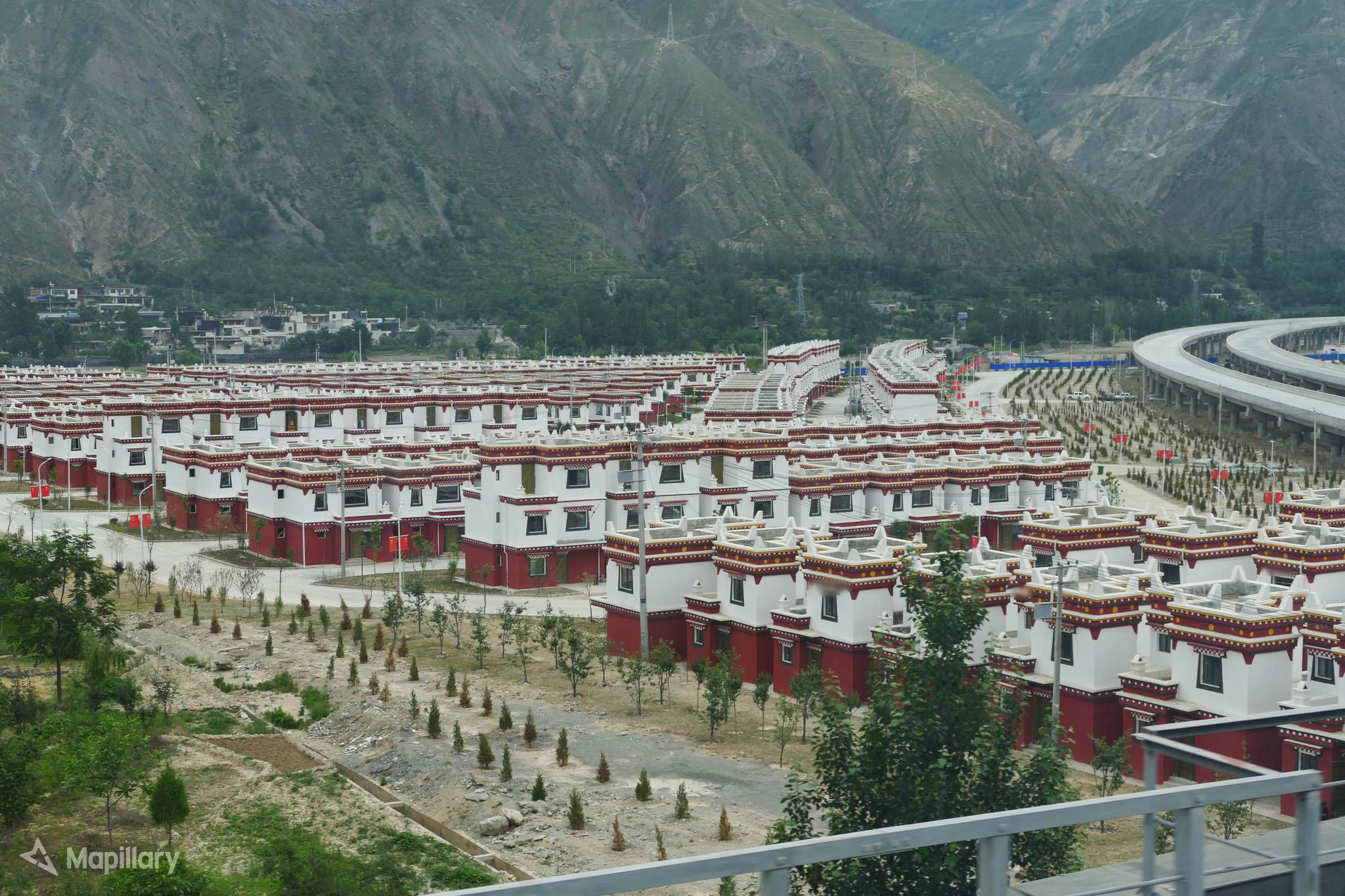
Pingya, a township in Gansu province. Part of the township's population was resettled as part of poverty alleviation efforts.

The concept of Targeted Poverty Alleviation (Chinese: 精准扶贫) was first raised by Xi Jinping, General Secretary of the Chinese Communist Party (CCP), to combat poverty in China. In 2020, China eliminated absolute poverty, as defined by the World Bank criteria.

Targeted poverty alleviation plays into China's poverty alleviation strategy, and is to contribute to the Party's century goal of "comprehensively building a "moderately prosperous society" that is the first objective of Xi Jinping's agenda of the Four Comprehensives. In his speeches, Xi Jinping emphasizes that without solving the poverty problem in rural areas, China cannot become a moderately prosperous society.

The Targeted Poverty Alleviation Strategy was officially adopted by the Chinese government in 2014. Chinese premier, Li Keqiang, said in his government report in March 2014, "local governments need to merge poverty alleviation resources….and take targeted measures to ensure that assistance reaches poverty-stricken villages and households."

== Background ==
From 2002 to 2012, the administration of Hu Jintao and Wen Jiabao introduced poverty alleviation measures via direct cash transfers to poorer regions and poorer people. Cash transfers were directed by the central government with eligibility determined by provincial or city/county level governments. Poor regions were defined based on GDP per capita, income per capita, and local government revenue per capita. Poor people were defined by household income per capita and employability.

In November 2011, then Chinese Premier Wen Jiabao announced that China was raising the poverty line from RMB 1274 to 2300 (per capita net income). More than 128 million Chinese were living under that line, which meant they could only spend 1 US dollar per day.

The World Bank's international poverty line was $1.90 US dollars per person, per day in 2011 purchasing power parity (PPP).

In 2015, the central government of China revised the poverty line, ruling that people with an annual income of less than 2800 RMB (400 US dollars per year or 1,10 US dollars per day) were in absolute poverty.

== Battle against poverty ==
In 2015, the government of the People's Republic of China initiated the "Decisions of the Central Committee of the CCP and the State Council on Winning the Battle of Poverty Eradication" with the aim to lift 70 million of the rural population above the poverty line until 2020. Consequently, the PRC endeavors to bring one million people per month and 30,000 people per day out of impoverishment.

The Targeted Poverty Alleviation Strategy functions as a high-profile political campaign with leading groups on poverty alleviation established at all administrative levels. The campaign is accompanied by a book collecting General Secretary Xi Jinping's quotes on poverty alleviation published by the CCP. The campaign-based approach is a common mechanism in Chinese politics in order to achieve highly prioritized political objectives within limited time.

For the respective campaign, a significant amount of financial resources has been pooled: For 2019, the Chinese government has allocated 91 billion RMB (approximately US$13 billion) to poverty alleviation funds. Additionally, the China Development Bank has pledged 400 billion RMB (approximately US$57 billion) for the combat of poverty. Besides through the remarkable financial commitment, the PRC also mobilizes large parts of the political system as well as of the private sector to achieve its objective of poverty alleviation.

=== National poverty registration system ===
In January 2014, the State Council of China published the "Opinions on Innovative Mechanisms to Promote Rural Poverty Alleviation and Development". In order to find the "real poor" and "really alleviate poverty" the state planned a national database (jiandang lika) where every poor household (instead of county) is registered, where their progress can be tracked and where they can be "managed dynamically". By 2019, the system registered data of 128,000 villages and 290,000 households. It identified Guizhou, Hunan, Guangxi, Sichuan and Yunnan as the most poverty-stricken areas.

=== Decisions of the on Winning the Battle of Poverty Eradication ===
In November 2015, the Central Conference on Poverty Alleviation and Development adopted the "Decisions of the Central Committee of the CCP and the State Council on Winning the Battle of Poverty Eradication", emphasizing the urgency of poverty alleviation in China. The guiding principles of the Decisions are the following:

1) The Four Modernizations of former core leader Deng Xiaoping;

2) The Theory of Three Represents (三个代表);

3) Hu Jintao's concept of scientific development, including economic production, cultural development and political consensus;

4) The spirit of the series of keynote speeches by General Secretary Xi Jinping around the Four Comprehensives:

1. Comprehensively building a moderately prosperous society;
2. Comprehensively deepening the reform;
3. Comprehensively governing the nation according to law;
4. Comprehensively and strictly governing the Party.

The Decisions develop several goals: They aim to solve Two No Worries and Three Guarantees. Furthermore, for 2020, the per capita average of rural farmers is targeted above the national average. In order to achieve these goals, the government implements several strategies such as resettlement and industrial development of impoverished rural areas.

=== The 13th Five-Year Plan for Poverty Alleviation ===
In December 2016, the State Council of the People's Republic of China issued the "13th Five-Year Plan for Poverty Alleviation", proposing to adhere to the combination of targeted assistance and overall regional development, and to promote the implementation of a number of poverty alleviation projects.

=== The "tough battle" against poverty ===
In October 2017, Xi urged "all-out" efforts to fight the "tough battle" against poverty. Two months later a statement was issued after the Central Economic Work Conference which also targeted poverty alleviation as one of three "tough battles" to win on the following three years, along with major risk control and pollution prevention.

Significant measures were applied to reach the goal. Banks were encouraged to give microloans to farmers. Rural cooperatives were set up in many places allowing farmers to put together their resources to raise production.

=== "Guiding Opinions on the Three-Year Action Plan to Win the Battle against Poverty" ===
In August 2018, the CCP Central Committee issued "Guiding Opinions on the Three Year Action Plan to Win the Battle against Poverty". The opinions emphasize three major objectives for the last three years of the battle:

1) consolidate the achievements of poverty alleviation;

2) ensure that there are no more poverty-stricken counties and raise the per capita income of the rural population;

3) establish and enhance basic public services in rural areas.

=== Targeted Poverty Alleviation in the context of the COVID-19 pandemic ===
In a speech in March 2020 on the 'Symposium on the decisive battle and decisive victory in the fight to get rid of poverty', Xi Jinping stated that the CCP's goal to lift all of the PRC's population out of poverty until 2020 was still within reach – even with increased obstacles due to the COVID-19 pandemic. At the same time, Xi also emphasized that the achievement of this goal in 2020 would not mean an end to the party's efforts. A transitional period and enhanced control mechanisms might have to be put in place to prevent unsustainable poverty alleviation and to expose fake poverty alleviation (虚假脱贫 xū jiǎ tuō pín).

This sentiment is also reflected in Li Keqiang's statement during a press conference in the course of the 13th National People's Congress in May 2020. Li also spoke about the increased difficulties posed to the CCP's commitment for 2020. But he also stated that with increased efforts by all government levels and the deployment of security and rescue funds, getting rid of poverty within 2020 was still the unchanged goal for the CCP.

=== Results ===
In 2020, China eliminated absolute poverty, as defined by the World Bank criteria. Along with China having become an upper-middle income country, this outcome met the first of the country's Two Centenaries goals.

Academic Bingqin Li writes that the campaign has increased overall political trust in China.

== Political actors and structures ==
=== Xi Jinping ===
Poverty alleviation has been one of Xi Jinping's priorities. The CCP set 2020 as the year that the country should wipe out poverty and become a moderately prosperous society or xiaokang. Xi has said that "no one should be left behind on the road towards xiaokang."

China's official media reports that Xi has toured dozens of impoverished villages since he took office as CCP general secretary in 2012, "sharing his rich experience in poverty eradication work and putting himself on the front lines of the war on poverty." In November 2013, he paid an inspection visit to Xiangxi, Hunan province in central China. During his tour to Shibadong village in Xiangxi, Xi asked the local government to take measures to "keep track of every household and individual in poverty to verify that their treatment is having the desired effect."

=== Party-state institutions ===
The party-state's poverty alleviation strategy is implemented on all administrative levels. At the central level, it is led by two main institutional bodies: the State Council's Leading Group for Poverty Alleviation and Development (国务院扶贫开发领导小组 guó wù yuàn fú pín kāi fā lǐng dǎo xiǎo zǔ) led by PRC Vice Premier Hu Chunhua represents the main state institution mandated with poverty alleviation. Within the organization of the CCP, there exists an additional Central Rural Work Leading Group that also oversees poverty alleviation in the Chinese countryside. This group is led by PRC Minister of Agriculture and Rural Affairs Han Changfu. The two leading groups have their counterparts at all administrative levels down to the township level.

=== State mechanisms of policy implementation ===
The PRC uses several mechanisms in order to implement the centralized poverty alleviation strategy effectively.

==== Vertical political integration and horizontal political integration ====
Vertical political integration, (tiao tiao 条条) is used in order to link governmental instances vertically to higher instances at the center. In that manner, the higher scales pass down the central policy. The lower scales, such as localities, enjoy self-governing rights and are free to develop their own strategies to achieve poverty alleviation. Horizontal political integration (kuai kuai 块块) is used to include various governmental sectors. Cross-system leading groups exist which consist of the leaders of all relevant departments such as the ones in charge of party affairs, finance, education, transportation, the armed police as well as the discipline inspection commission.

==== Pairing-up ====
The nationwide classification of "poor" households is achieved through a national registration system which enables local officials to collect data from each individual person, household and village. Each household that has been designated as poor, is assigned a cadre who serves as a personal advisor in the household's poverty alleviation. Once considered poor, households have a "targeted support contact card" (精准帮扶联系卡; jīng zhǔn bāng fú lián xì kǎ) hung on their doors, which records the name of their cadre and the amount of subsidies the household is receiving.

==== Monitoring and evaluation ====
A profound system of monitoring and evaluation contributes to the effectiveness of the targeted poverty alleviation campaign. Cadres are obliged to follow due process and report each step of implementation of poverty alleviation action. While good performance is rewarded with promotions and bonuses, bad performance is sanctioned with salary cuts, reduction in the bonus and refusals of promotions. Evaluation is carried out as a two-way-mechanism as cadres from higher scales control lower scales and the other way around. The individual households also assess the performance of their personal cadres. This motivates the cadres to lift their assigned households over the poverty line.

==== State-owned enterprises ====
China's state-owned enterprises are important to the targeted poverty alleviation campaign.

=== The role of the villages ===
==== Background information on village-level poverty alleviation: "building a new socialist countryside" ====
The divide of living standards between coastal provinces and the interior regions as well as the divide between cities and the countryside grew massively since the mid-1990s. The nationwide implementation of the Targeted Poverty Alleviation Campaign and its accompanying measures for rapid poverty reduction, has led to considerable changes in village structures. Two main political goals are apparent:

(1) new (adapted) governance structures enhance the overall effectiveness of the set of measures and (2) enable the party-state to reclaim lost ground in the villages. The latter must be considered in the light of the manifold reforms after the reform and opening up in the 1978, in particular the introduction of the household responsibility system, and rural tax reforms in 2006.

These profound changes enabled the rural population to emancipate themselves from the reliance on local party cadres and the institutionalized dependencies. The party-state experienced a governance crisis in rural areas of the country. As part of its fight against poverty in the countryside, Hu Jintao implemented a campaign of "building a new socialist countryside" (建设社会主义新农村) to reduce urban-rural inequalities. The aim was to deal with three problems in the countryside: suffering amongst village people, poverty in the countryside, as well as threats to agriculture.

==== The first-secretary-in-residence scheme ====
There were setbacks in the implementation of "building a new socialist countryside" due to the governance crisis on the countryside. Policies from the top were not followed at the lowest level of government. This was particularly an issue in rural areas in the Southwest, more specifically in ethnic-minority villages in southwest China. In these areas, clannism hindered higher-level authorities from fully governing the villages. Clans in control would rule villages according to their own interests. Oftentimes, village cadres were clan members. In the past, the party had relied on local clans in order to maintain stability in the villages. Such villages were effectively independent kingdoms (独立王国 dú lì wáng guó). Money received from higher-level authorities for poverty alleviation was used for the benefit of clan members. Thus, Beijing was facing a lack of authority in certain parts of the country and hence had difficulties to fight rural poverty.

To be better able to decrease poverty rates in the countryside, the party put in place the system of a rural first-secretary-in-residence (驻村第一书记 zhù cūn dì yī shūjì). The first secretary sent to a specific village was to be in charge of the two village committees (村两委 cūn liǎng wěi), the party committee and the villagers' committee, which up until then had been led by the party secretary (村支书 cūn zhīshū) and chairman (村主任 cūn zhǔ rèn) respectively. In this system, the first secretary was a provincial cadre sent to the village for two years while still being employed by provincial authorities. The role was designed to fight clannism and enable effective poverty alleviation.

==== The case of Targeted Poverty Alleviation on village level: the Villagers Poverty Alleviation Working Committee in Ximeng, Yunnan ====
New village governance structures within the existing village constitution have been developed in recent years. One example for these recent efforts is the Villagers Poverty Alleviation Working Committee (村民小组脱贫工作委员会 cūnmín xiǎozǔ tuōpín gōngzuò wěiyuánhuì) in Ximeng County in Yunnan. Led by the "two Committees" (两委 liang wei), which are the local party branch (村中国共产党员支部委员会 cun zhongguo gongchandang yuzhibu weiyuanhui) and the village committee (村民自治委员会 cunmin zizhi weiyuanhui), the Villagers Poverty Alleviation Working Committee is composed of five to seven members (based on the number of households in the village) who are responsible for the success of their assigned households (approx. 15-30 households per committee member) to overcome poverty. The membership structure within the Committee resembles the existing power structure in the village. Members of the Committee include local party officials, leaders of the village community and leaders of the local branches of mass organizations. Accordingly, up to 60% of committee members are directly affiliated with the CCP. The Committees hold weekly internal meetings and monthly public meetings. Intra-Committee positions include a production officer (生产委员 shengchan weiyuan), a life officer (生活委员 shenghuo weiyuan), a public security officer (治安委员 zhian weiyuan) and a propaganda officer (宣传委员 xuanzhuan weiyuan).

The Committee uses its powers particularly in two ways: firstly, through the newly established Village Labor Service Posts (村务和劳务服务岗 cunwu he laowu fuwugang), the committee members can force villagers into employment; secondly, through a reward and punishment mechanism (完善奖惩机制 wanshan jiangcheng jizhi), villagers are classified according to their job performance, political attitude, participation in village affairs and other factors in two lists. Villagers on the red list will receive rewards in financial payment and/or payment in kind. Villagers on the black list may lose financial support by the government.

The new Committee system of Ximeng has met with positive response on the national level and received the national poverty alleviation innovation award (全国脱贫攻坚组织创新奖 quanguo tuopin gongjian zuzhi chuangxin jiang) in September 2019. The prominence through the national award may stimulate additional counties implementing Ximeng's governance innovation.

=== Society ===
The Chinese government regards the participation of the whole society crucial for overcoming poverty. Therefore, the central government announced a statement on November 19, 2014, by the General Office of the State Council, how to mobilize all social forces to participate in poverty reduction and development in China.

Participation by private companies is a significant factor to reduce poverty in the PRC. Through the aid and collaboration of private companies, the market economy can be stimulated and new capital and technology can be brought into the countryside. Private enterprises are considered to bring job opportunities, career training, investments and donations to rural China. According to the All-China Federation of Industry and Commerce, 109,500 private companies had contributed ¥106.8 billion for poverty alleviation as of June 2020.

Individuals can also join the effort of poverty alleviation. To reduce social and economic disparities between the east and west, the government encourages cooperation of eastern and western business sectors, offers vocational training and sends talented youth and professionals from the east to remote areas in western China. The Chinese government fosters education of voluntary organizations which encourage the advantages of respective participants, e.g. students, experts, technicians, retirees, and other members of society. Thus, a service network of volunteers is built in rural western China. Furthermore, the Chinese government promotes an intensive system to encourage social participation in poverty allocation, via commendations, awards, and better career opportunities.

Through the establishment of common projects or brands, sales are promoted or donations are given to projects to help people that are identified as poor. Also, for the poor villages and households who have difficulty in using the internet or who do not have access to the internet, information services are established to offer detailed project plans and improve the efficiency of resource allocation.

==== "10,000 Enterprises Help 10,000 Villages" ====
The "10,000 Enterprises Help 10,000 Villages" (万企帮万村 wanqi bang wancun) project is a large-scale example of the integration of the private sector and society into Targeted Poverty Alleviation. It functions through three mechanisms: (1) poverty alleviation through industry, (2) poverty alleviation through employment and (3) poverty alleviation through public welfare.

First, in the context of the "10,000 Enterprises Help 10,000 Villages" project, industrial enterprises should grant poor villages and households access to the respective development benefits that enterprises generate in poverty-stricken areas through the exploitation of natural resources. Enterprises should expand their rural business, give full play to the advantages of Internet Plus, strengthen cooperation with postal services, supply and marketing cooperation and other systems, help villages and households connect to the market, and expand online and offline sale channels. Large enterprises are encouraged to set up industrial investment funds in poverty-stricken areas and adopt a market-oriented operation method for the construction of industrial parks.

Secondly, enterprises should furthermore be encouraged to recruit employees, strengthen pre-job and in-service training, provide labor and social security and achieve stable employment and income increase for poor households. Enterprises also should encourage private vocational colleges and vocational skill training institutions to recruit children from poor households, combine enterprise poverty alleviation with vocational education, and realize poverty alleviation through the development of skills.

Thirdly, enterprises are encouraged to make direct donations, set up poverty alleviation public welfare funds, grant poverty alleviation public trusts or carry out poverty alleviation through public welfare organizations. In order to help impoverished villages, enterprises ought to engage in projects of infrastructural, medical, educational, social and cultural development.

As part of the "10,000 Enterprises Help 10,000 Villages" project, companies like the Alibaba Group have been very visible in poverty alleviation in recent years. Alibaba has lent over 100 billion RMB (US$14.3 billion) to more than 2 million users in poverty-stricken counties in the PRC. Between 2017 and 2022, the holding plans to invest 10 billion RMB (1,43 billion USD) into poverty alleviation projects in the fields of education, e-commerce, health, women empowerment and environmental protection. One of Alibaba's biggest initiatives is the establishment of Taobao villages that are named after Alibaba's online shopping website Taobao. These villages are transformed into e-commerce hubs to encourage farmers to sell their products online. Annual e-commerce transactions of over 10 million RMB and more than 100 online stores qualify a village for the title Taobao village. Taobao villages were established in cooperation with villagers who had returned from bigger cities with entrepreneurial skills and the support of local governments providing infrastructure, e-commerce training, finance and subsidies for specialized e-commerce service providers and companies.

A tool for direct participation of citizens is the website "Social Participation in Poverty Alleviation and Development in China" run by the China Social Poverty Alleviation Network. On this website, people that are classified as poor can ask for donations for medical, educational or housing purposes. By donating on this website, people can directly support poverty-stricken households. Moreover, people can buy products from poor regions and crowdfund poverty alleviation projects.

In Xinjiang, where local governments seek to address ethnic tensions in the region through poverty alleviation and redistributive programs, officials paired 1,000 villages with 1,000 enterprises for economic development projects. For example, a Xinjiang copper mining company helped villagers build a dam and other infrastructure, engaged in job creation, funded primary schools, and helped build tourism-related infrastructure.

== Preliminary achievements and criticism ==
According to Liu Yongfu, director of the State Council Leading Group Office of Poverty Alleviation and Development, nearly 100 million people were recognized by the Chinese government as poor people. But from 2012 to 2016, more than half of the population living under the poverty line has been lifted out of poverty. An average of 13 million poor people cleared the poverty line per year during the five-year period. The Targeted Poverty Alleviation Campaign and the fast allocation of resources have quickly raised the living standards of many households in rural China. From 2015 to 2019, 68 million people were lifted out of rural poverty. This corresponds to 37,000 people per day. The national poverty rate changed from 10.2% in 2015 to 3.1% in 2019.

However, the political necessity to achieve the 2020 target led various counties to develop quick fixes instead of sustainable strategies that would lead to economic benefits in the long run. Academics report that households often receive one-time financial or material support in order to officially escape the poverty line. However, it is possible that such recipients of aid will fall back into poverty once the Targeted Poverty Alleviation Campaign comes to its end.

A further point of criticism refers to the possibility of cadres manipulating the poverty alleviation statistics of households for the sake of personal promotion. Cadres may thus focus on the compliance with the implementation system and do not consider the alleviation of poverty as their primary objective.

Additionally, Targeted Poverty Alleviation principally addresses relatively better-off poor households as their promotion is more likely to benefit the local economy. The least well-off of the poor are often excluded from public support. Similarly, conflicts exist between poor households and those that are not classified as poor. Households are encouraged to feign poverty in order to receive state benefits from the Targeted Poverty Alleviation Campaign. In this context, cadres may prioritize their relatives and friends as poverty-stricken households.
