= Gao Hongbin (politician, born 1954) =

Chinese politician

Gao Hongbin (May 1953 – May 10, 2024, Chinese: 高鸿宾), a native of Beijing, was an official of the People's Republic of China.

== Biography ==
Gao Hongbin joined the Chinese Communist Party (CCP) in December 1975. He conducted research on agricultural and rural economic policy since the early 1980s and held the positions of deputy director and director of the Political Research Division of the Office of the State Council Leading Group for Economic Development of Impoverished Areas since January 1984, as well as deputy director of the office.

Since January 1994, he held the positions of deputy director and director of the office of the State Council Leading Group for Poverty Alleviation and Development, as well as a member of the Leading Group for Poverty Alleviation and Development of the State Council and the director of the office.

In February 1995, he assumed the position of Director of the Foreign Capital Project Management Center of the State Council Leading Group Office of Poverty Alleviation and Development in February 1995. Subsequently, in April 1996, he was appointed a member of the State Council Leading Group of Poverty Alleviation and Development and deputy director of the office. In March 2003, he was appointed the deputy director of the State Council Leading Group Office of Poverty Alleviation and Development (Chinese: 国务院扶贫开发领导小组).

From July 2007 to July 2013, he served as the Vice Minister of the Ministry of Agriculture.

He was a member of the 12th National Committee of the Chinese People's Political Consultative Conference. He died on May 10, 2024, at the age of 72 in Beijing.
