= Roll up our sleeves and work hard =

Slogan by Xi Jinping

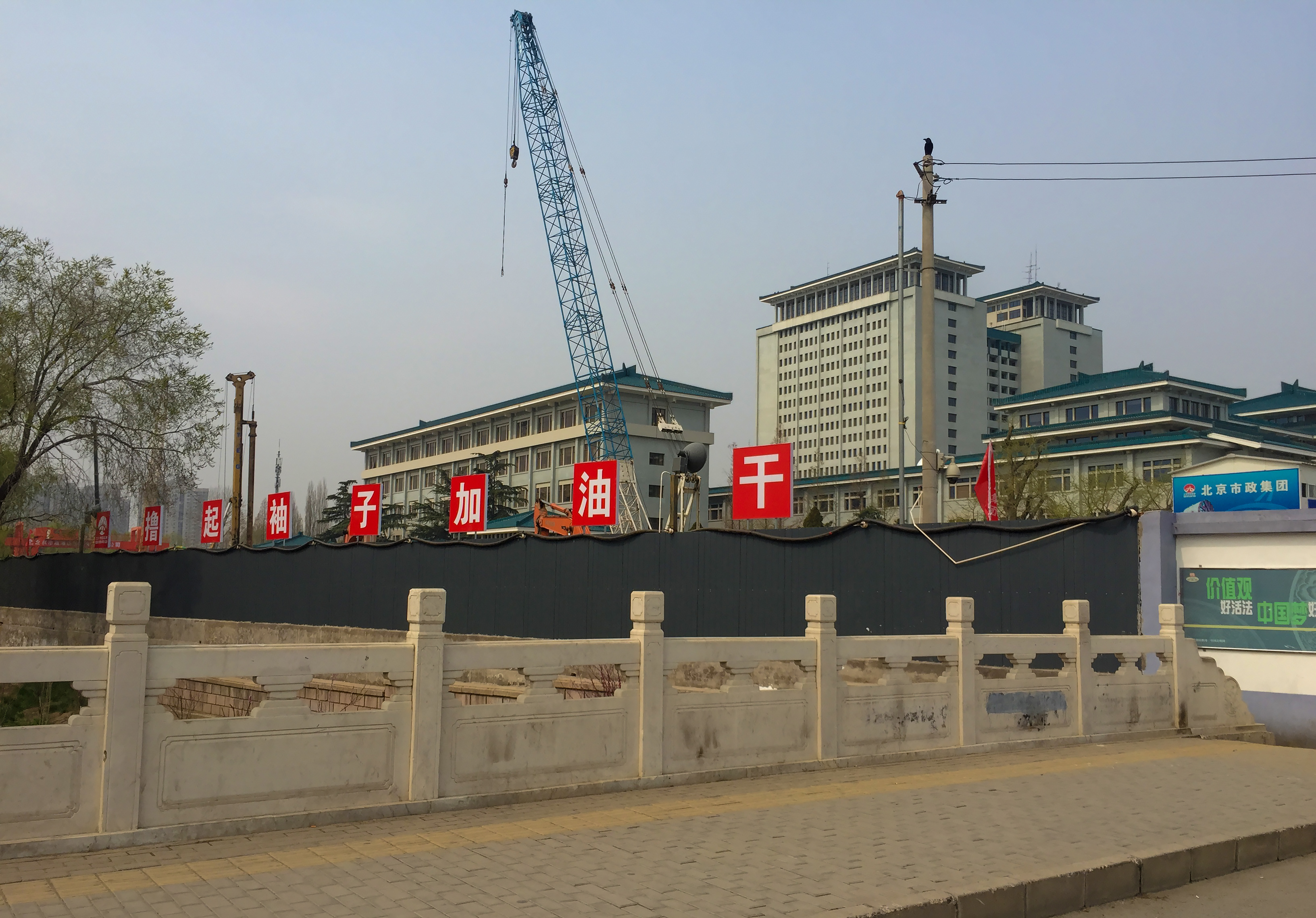
In March 2017, a slogan reading "Roll up your sleeves and work hard" was posted on the fence of the National Library Station on Beijing Subway Line 16.

Roll up our sleeves and work hard (Chinese: 撸起袖子加油干; pinyin: Lū qǐ xiùzi jiāyóu gàn) is a political slogan stated by Xi Jinping, general secretary of the Chinese Communist Party, in his official 2017 New Year's message.

== History ==
On 31 December 2016, Xi Jinping delivered his 2017 New Year's message in Beijing, in which he said, "As long as our 1.3 billion people work together in solidarity, as long as our Party always stands with the people, and as long as everyone rolls up their sleeves and works hard, we will surely be able to successfully carry out the Long March of our generation." The next day, the People's Daily published a commentary article saying that "roll up your sleeves and work hard" is a slogan for achieving the Four Comprehensives and the Chinese Dream. Xinhua News Agency also published an article on the same day saying that "roll up your sleeves and work hard" is the mission given to the party by this era.

After Xi Jinping delivered his New Year's speech, party and government propaganda departments and media across the country began to use the slogan. Students from the School of Journalism and Communication at the Communication University of China designed a WeChat emoticon package called "Learn Quotes" for the slogan. The emoticon package selected 16 common phrases from Xi Jinping's important speeches as dynamic emoticons, and "Roll up your sleeves and work hard" was one of them. People's Daily Online said that the emoticon package received rave reviews and "social media platforms are showing a trend of 'sweeping the screen'", which is a "clear stream" in the emoticon package world.

In May 2017, Hunan Satellite TV used this slogan as the theme and created a channel visual logo called "Work hard, be more youthful", and simultaneously changed the channel slogan to "Work hard, be more youthful". In September 2017, the Advertising Management Center of China Central Television produced a public service advertisement titled "Roll Up Your Sleeves and Work Hard" with this slogan as the theme.

== Reactions ==
In February 2017, Zhang Haishun, director and party secretary of the Quality Supervision Bureau of the Inner Mongolia Autonomous Region, mocked the slogan at a meeting, changing it to "lift up your skirt and work hard" and repeatedly emphasized it. This caused dissatisfaction among the authorities and he was dismissed.

Tang Yun, an associate professor at Chongqing Normal University, criticized the phrase "roll up your sleeves and work hard" as extremely vulgar and damaging to the beauty of the Chinese language, which was one of the reasons for his dismissal.
