= Leye County =

Leye 乐业县
- County
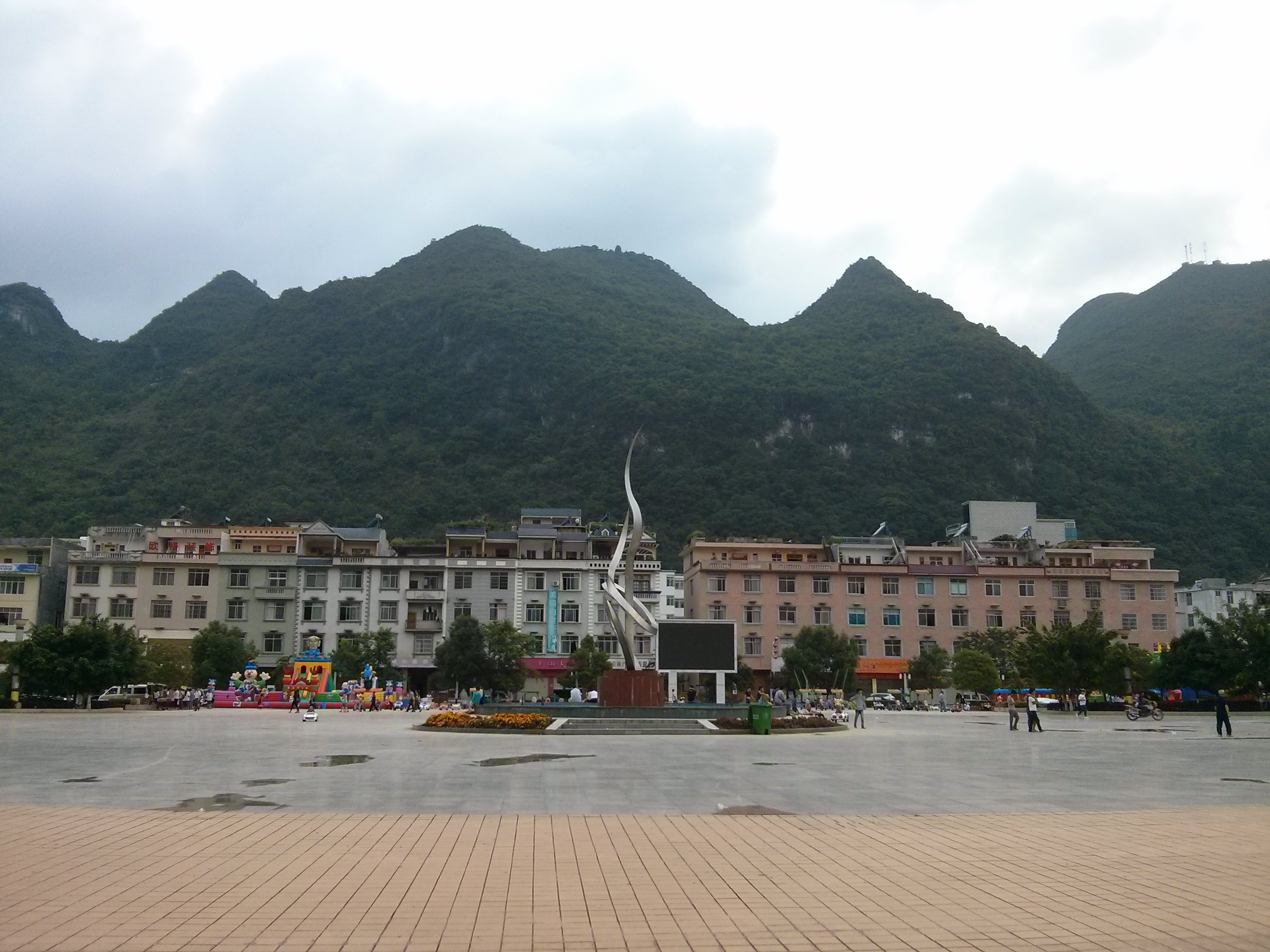

- Location of the seat in Guangxi
- Coordinates: 24°48′N 106°34′E
- Country: China
- Province: Guangxi
- Prefecture-level city: Baise
- County seat: Tongle

Area
  - Total: 2,617 km^{2} (1,010 sq mi)

Population (2020)
  - Total: 146,397
  - Density: 55.94/km^{2} (144.9/sq mi)
- Time zone: UTC+8 (China Standard)
- Postal code: 533200
- Website: http://xq.bsyjrb.com/leye/

Leye County (simplified Chinese: 乐业县; traditional Chinese: 樂業縣; pinyin: Lèyè Xiàn) is a county in the northwest of Guangxi Zhuang Autonomous Region, China. It is under the administration of Baise city.

== Administrative divisions ==
Leye County is divided into 4 towns and 4 townships:

towns

- Tongle 同乐镇
- Gantian 甘田镇
- Xinhua 新化镇
- Huaping 花坪镇

townships

- Luosha 逻沙乡
- Luoxi 逻西乡
- Youping 幼平乡
- Yachang 雅长乡

== Climate ==
Climate data for Leye, elevation 1,031 m (3,383 ft), (1991–2020 normals, extremes 1981–2010)
Month	Jan	Feb	Mar	Apr	May	Jun	Jul	Aug	Sep	Oct	Nov	Dec	Year
Record high °C (°F)	26.8 (80.2)	30.1 (86.2)	32.0 (89.6)	34.4 (93.9)	34.0 (93.2)	33.5 (92.3)	33.4 (92.1)	33.1 (91.6)	32.9 (91.2)	30.1 (86.2)	29.0 (84.2)	25.6 (78.1)	34.4 (93.9)
Mean daily maximum °C (°F)	12.1 (53.8)	15.0 (59.0)	18.8 (65.8)	23.6 (74.5)	25.8 (78.4)	27.1 (80.8)	28.0 (82.4)	28.1 (82.6)	26.0 (78.8)	22.1 (71.8)	18.7 (65.7)	14.0 (57.2)	21.6 (70.9)
Daily mean °C (°F)	8.2 (46.8)	10.6 (51.1)	14.1 (57.4)	18.7 (65.7)	21.3 (70.3)	23.2 (73.8)	23.8 (74.8)	23.4 (74.1)	21.3 (70.3)	17.8 (64.0)	14.0 (57.2)	9.6 (49.3)	17.2 (62.9)
Mean daily minimum °C (°F)	5.6 (42.1)	7.7 (45.9)	11.0 (51.8)	15.3 (59.5)	18.2 (64.8)	20.5 (68.9)	21.2 (70.2)	20.5 (68.9)	18.3 (64.9)	15.2 (59.4)	10.9 (51.6)	6.6 (43.9)	14.3 (57.7)
Record low °C (°F)	−3.2 (26.2)	−4.4 (24.1)	−1.8 (28.8)	4.5 (40.1)	7.9 (46.2)	12.8 (55.0)	12.9 (55.2)	14.9 (58.8)	8.4 (47.1)	5.1 (41.2)	0.2 (32.4)	−4.2 (24.4)	−4.4 (24.1)
Average precipitation mm (inches)	25.8 (1.02)	20.1 (0.79)	42.0 (1.65)	78.0 (3.07)	152.0 (5.98)	257.7 (10.15)	261.2 (10.28)	218.5 (8.60)	129.9 (5.11)	82.7 (3.26)	34.8 (1.37)	21.5 (0.85)	1,324.2 (52.13)
Average precipitation days (≥ 0.1 mm)	12.2	10.9	13.5	13.7	15.4	17.8	19.2	18.2	12.6	11.7	9.1	8.6	162.9
Average snowy days	1.2	0.6	0.1	0	0	0	0	0	0	0	0	0.3	2.2
Average relative humidity (%)	81	78	79	77	79	83	84	84	82	82	80	78	81
Mean monthly sunshine hours	63.4	75.8	95.3	123.3	127.7	105.5	129.0	143.0	123.9	98.9	106.8	89.4	1,282
Percentage possible sunshine	19	24	25	32	31	26	31	36	34	28	33	27	29
Source: China Meteorological Administration

=== Discoveries ===
- In May 2022, a team of cave explorers discovered a giant sinkhole with a hidden forest there.

== See also ==
- List of UNESCO Global Geoparks in Asia
