= Timeline of Chinese texts =

This is a timeline of important Chinese texts including their final primary author and character count when available.

== 11th century BC ==
Year	Date	Event
around 1050 BC		Etiquette and Ceremonial (56,115 characters) by the Duke of Zhou
11th-7th c. BC		Classic of Poetry (39,224 characters)

== 9th century BC ==
Year	Date	Event
around 850 BC		I Ching (24,207 characters)
around 850 BC		Lianshan
around 850 BC		Guicang

== 5th century BC ==
Year	Date	Event
496 BC		The Art of War (6,075 characters) by Sunzi
484 BC		Book of Documents (25,000 characters) compiled by Confucius
484 BC		Yi Zhou Shu, materials related to but not compiled into Book of Documents
479 BC		Spring and Autumn Annals (~18,000 characters) compiled by Confucius
468 BC		Zuo zhuan (196,845 characters) by Zuo Qiuming
451 BC		Guoyu (book) by Zuo Qiuming

== 4th century BC ==
Year	Date	Event
391 BC		Mozi (book) (~100,000 characters) by Mozi et al.
381 BC		Wuzi (16,127 characters) by Wu Qi
around 350 BC		Thirty-Six Stratagems
around 350 BC		Classic of Filial Piety (1,903 characters)
around 350 BC		The Methods of the Sima (3,431 characters) by Sima Rangju
338 BC		The Book of Lord Shang (24,519 characters) by Shang Yang
325 BC		Wei Liaozi (49,034 characters) by Wei Liao
325 BC		Tao Te Ching by Laozi
316 BC		Sun Bin's Art of War by Sun Bin

== 3rd century BC ==
Year	Date	Event
around 300 BC		Book of Rites (99,027 characters)
296 BC		Bamboo Annals
289 BC		Mengzi (book) (34,685 characters) by Mengzi et al.
286 BC		Zhuangzi (book) (64,606 characters) by Zhuang Zhou
284 BC		Zhan Guo Ce (120,000 characters) by Su Qin
263 BC		Chu Ci by Qu Yuan and Song Yu
239 BC		Lüshi Chunqiu by Lü Buwei
238 BC		Xunzi (book) (91,000 characters) by Xun Kuang
233 BC		Han Feizi (~100,000 characters) by Han Fei
228 BC		Shiben
before 221 BC		Six Secret Teachings (~20,000 characters)
before 221 BC		Rites of Zhou (45,806 characters )

== 2nd century BC ==
Year	Date	Event
186 BC		Three Strategies of Huang Shigong (3,800 characters) by Jiang Ziya
before 140 BC		Analects (13,113 characters) by Confucius et al.

== 1st century BC ==
Year	Date	Event
94 BC		Records of the Grand Historian (533,505 characters) by Sima Qian
around 50 BC		Erya (13,113 characters) by anonymous
6 BC		Classic of Mountains and Seas (34,744 characters) compiled by Liu Xiang

== 2nd century ==
Year	Date	Event
111		Book of Han (742,298 characters) by Ban Gu

== 3rd century ==
Year	Date	Event
265		Weilüe by Yu Huan
280		Records of the Three Kingdoms (377,803 characters) by Chen Shou

== 4th century ==
Year	Date	Event
361		Chronicles of Huayang (~110,000 characters) by Chang Qu

== 5th century ==
Year	Date	Event
444		A New Account of the Tales of the World by Liu Yiqing
445		Book of Later Han (894,020 characters) by Fan Ye
450		Sunzi Suanjing
488		Book of Song (811,893 characters) by Shen Yue

== 6th century ==
Year	Date	Event
514		Book of Qi (299,257 characters) by Xiao Zixian
522		Spring and Autumn Annals of the Sixteen Kingdoms by Cui Hong
550		Dunhuang Go Manual
554		Book of Wei (998,329 characters) by Wei Shou
590		Jingchu Suishiji

== 7th century ==
Year	Date	Event
636		Book of Liang (294,438 characters) by Yao Silian
636		Book of Chen (163,382 characters) by Yao Silian
636		Book of Northern Qi (212,506 characters) by Li Baiyao
636		Book of Zhou by (262,659 characters) Linghu Defen
648		Book of Jin (1,158,126 characters) by Fang Xuanling
649		Questions and Replies between Tang Taizong and Li Weigong
656		Book of Sui (701,698 characters) by Wei Zheng et al.
659		History of the Southern Dynasties (677,624 characters) by Li Yanshou
659		History of the Northern Dynasties (1,106,543 characters) by Li Yanshou

== 8th century ==
Year	Date	Event
710		Shitong (~88,000 characters) by Liu Zhiji
724		Treatise on Astrology of the Kaiyuan Era by Gautama Siddha
762		The Classic of Tea (~7,000 characters) by Lu You

== 9th century ==
Year	Date	Event
801		Tongdian (~1,700,000 characters) by Du You

== 10th century ==
Year	Date	Event
945		Old Book of Tang (2,002,600 characters) by Liu Xu
974		Old History of the Five Dynasties (790,879 characters) by Xue Juzheng
978		Taiping Guangji (~3,000,000 characters) by Li Fang
982		Wudai Huiyao by Wang Pu
983		Taiping Yulan (~4,700,000 characters) by Li Fang
986		Wenyuan Yinghua by Li Fang
997		Taiping Huanyu Ji by Yue Shi

== 11th century ==
Year	Date	Event
1013		Cefu Yuangui (~9,400,000 characters) by Wang Qinruo
1014		Jiu Guo Zhi by Lu Zhen
1044		Wujing Zongyao by Zeng Gongliang
1060		New Book of Tang (1,694,794 characters) by Ouyang Xiu
1072		Historical Records of the Five Dynasties (291,476) by Ouyang Xiu
1084		Zizhi Tongjian (~3,000,000 characters) by Sima Guang
1088		Dream Pool Essays by Shen Kuo

== 12th century ==
Year	Date	Event
1107		Treatise on Tea by Emperor Huizong of Song
1180		Sushui Jiwen by Sima Guang

== 13th century ==
Year	Date	Event
1200		Dongdu Shilüe by Wang Cheng
1213		Huang Song Shichao Gangyao Li Zhi
1225		Zhu Fan Zhi by Zhao Rukuo
1274		Qidan Guo Zhi by Ye Longji

== 14th century ==
Year	Date	Event
1339		Daoyi Zhilüe by Wang Dayuan
1344		History of Liao (296,254 characters) by Toqto'a (Yuan dynasty)
1344		History of Jin (931,070 characters) by Toqto'a (Yuan dynasty)
1345		History of Song (3,980,123 characters) by Toqto'a (Yuan dynasty)
1370		History of Yuan (1,611,849 characters) by Song Lian
1372		Water Margin (~960,000 characters) by Shi Naian
1395		Huolongjing by Jiao Yu and Liu Ji
1396		Baiyi Zhuan by Qian Guxun and Li Sicong

== 15th century ==
Year	Date	Event
1400		Romance of the Three Kingdoms (~900,000 characters) by Luo Guanzhong
1408		Yongle Encyclopedia (~370,000,000 characters)
1451		Yingya Shenglan by Ma Huan

== 16th century ==
Year	Date	Event
1561		Jixiao Xinshu (~74,000 characters) by Qi Jiguang
1578		Compendium of Materia Medica (~2,000,000 characters) by Li Shizhen
1582		Journey to the West (~860,000 characters) by Wu Cheng'en
1590		A Book to Burn by Li Zhi

== 17th century ==
Year	Date	Event
c. 1600s		"Investiture of the Gods" by Xu Zhonglin
1620		Stories Old and New by Feng Menglong
1621		Wubei Zhi by Mao Yuanyi
1624		Stories to Caution the World by Feng Menglong
1627		Stories to Awaken the World by Feng Menglong
1627		Slapping the Table in Amazement by Ling Mengchu
1635		Dijing Jingwulue by Liu Tong
1637		Tiangong Kaiwu by Song Yingxing
1689		Spring and Autumn Annals of the Ten Kingdoms by Wu Renchen

== 18th century ==
Year	Date	Event
1739		History of Ming (2,802,544 characters) by Zhang Tingyu
1764		Dream of the Red Chamber (730,000 characters) by Cao Xueqin
1773		Complete Library of the Four Treasuries (~800,000,000 characters)
