= Glossary of Chinese military writings =

This ist a Glossary of Chinese military writings.

The glossary provides a concise alphabetical overview of classical Chinese military and philosophical works. It concentrates mainly on military treatises, e.g., the writings classified under the bingjia lei 兵家類 (military category), a subcategory in traditional Chinese bibliographies. Besides the famous Seven Military Classics it incorporates books from various modern collections (congshu) of military writings, including Zhongguo bingshu jicheng 中国兵书集成 (ZGBSJC) and Zhongguo bingxue daxi 中國兵學大系 (ZGBXDX), as well as those books which are part of the Siku quanshu 四庫全書 (SKQS) or the Xuxiu Siku quanshu 續修四庫全書 (XXSKQS). The glossary serves as a reference for identifying and contextualizing key works such as the Seven Military Classics (→ Wujing qishu 武经七书) of Ancient China and others, offering essential bibliographic information for further study of traditional Chinese thought and strategy.

Many of the Chinese military writings/texts/books/works have various titles. The work known in English under the title The Art of War and attributed to the ancient Chinese military strategist Sun Wu or Sun Tzu ("Master Sun"; in Pinyin: Sunzi) is called in Chinese Sunzi bingfa 孫子兵法, Sunzi 孫子, Wujing 武經, Bingjing 兵經, Sun Wu bingfa 孫武兵法, or Wu Sunzi bingfa 吳孫子兵法, not to be confused with Sun Bin's Art of War (Sun Bin bingfa 孫臏兵法) of Sun Bin 孫臏, etc.

== Glossary ==
Note: Each title is listed along with Pinyin, Chinese, the number of volumes (juan 卷), the dynastic period in which it was compiled or commented upon, and the names of the authors or commentators when known. The information provided does not claim to be complete or up-to-date.

=== A ===
[no entry]

=== B ===
Baihaozi binglei
Baihaozi binglei 白毫子兵壘, 1 juan, (Ming) Yin Binshang 尹賓商

Baijiangzhuan
Baijiangzhuan 百將傳, 1 juan, (Song) Zhang Yu 張預

Baizhan qifa
Baizhan qifa 百戰奇法, 1 juan, (Song) Xie Fangde 謝枋得 (?)

Bazhen hebian tushuo
Bazhen hebian tushuo 八陣合變圖說, 1 juan, (Ming) Long Zheng 龍正 (or Lan Zhang 藍章)

Bianyi shiliu ce
Bianyi shiliu ce 便宜十六策, 1 juan, (Shu) Zhuge Liang 諸葛亮 (?)

Bingjing
Bingjing 兵經 (Bingjing baizi 兵經百字, Bingjing baipian 兵經百篇, Jiezi zhanshu 揭子戰書, Jiezi bingfa 揭子兵法), 1 juan, (Ming) Jie Xuan 揭暄 (see also Sunzi bingfa)

Bingjing leibian
Bingjing leibian 兵鏡類編, 1 juan, (Qing) Li Rui 李蕊

=== C ===
Caolu jinglüe
Caolu jinglüe 草廬經略, 1 juan, (Ming) anonymous

Changduanjing
Changduanjing 長短經, 1 juan, (Tang) Zhao Rui 趙蕤

Cheying kouda hebian
Cheying kouda hebian 車營扣答合編, 1 juan, (Ming) Sun Chengzong 孫承宗

Chouhai tubian
Chouhai tubian 籌海圖編, —, (Ming) Zheng Ruoceng 鄭若曾

Cuiwei beizheng lu
Cuiwei beizheng lu 翠微北征錄, 12 juan (續修), (Song) Hua Yue 華岳

=== D ===
Daodejing lunbing yaoyi
Daodejing lunbing yaoyi 道德經論兵要義, 1 juan, (Tang) Wang Zhen 王真

Dengtan bijiu
Dengtan bijiu 登壇必究, 1 juan, (Ming) Wang Minghe 王鳴鶴

Dushi fangyu jiyao
Dushi fangyu jiyao 讀史方輿紀要, —, (Qing) Gu Zuyu 顧祖禹

=== H ===
He boshi beilun
He boshi beilun 何博士備論, 2 juan, (Song) He Qufei 何去非

Huogong qieyao
Huogong qieyao 火攻挈要, 1 juan, (Ming) Jiao Xu 焦勖

Huangdi wen Xuannü bingfa
Huangdi wen Xuannü bingfa 黃帝問玄女兵法, 1 juan, (Qing) Hong Yixuan 洪頤煊 (comp.)

Huang Shigong sanlüe
Huang Shigong sanlüe 黃石公三略, 3 juan, (Zhou) Huang Shigong 黃石公 (?); (Ming) Liu Yin 劉寅 (comm.)

Huang Shigong sushu
Huang Shigong sushu 黃石公素書, 1 juan, (Zhou) Huang Shigong 黃石公 (?); (Song) Zhang Shangying 張商英 (comm.)

Huihuaji
Huihuaji 灰畫集, 1 juan, (Qing) Li Pei 李培

Huqianjing
Huqianjing 虎鈐經, 20 juan, (Song) Xu Dong 許洞

Huolong shenqi zhenfa
Huolong shenqi zhenfa 火龍神器陣法, 1 juan, (Ming) Jiao Yu 焦玉

=== J ===
Jiangnan jinglüe
Jiangnan jinglüe 江南經略, 8 juan, (Ming) Zheng Ruozeng 鄭若曾

Jiangyuan
Jiangyuan 將苑, 1 juan, (Shu) Zhuge Liang 諸葛亮

Jixiao xinshu
Jixiao xinshu 紀效新書, 16 juan, (Ming) Qi Jiguang 戚繼光

=== K ===
Kunwai chunqiu
Kunwai chunqiu 閫外春秋, 1 juan, (Tang) Li Quan 李筌

=== L ===
Liutao
Liutao 六韜 (Taigong Liutao 太公六韜), 6 juan, (Zhou) Jiang Shang 姜尚 or Lü Wang 呂望 (?)

Lianbing shiji
Lianbing shiji 練兵實紀, 9 juan, (Ming) Qi Jiguang 戚繼光

Lidai bingzhi
Lidai bingzhi 歷代兵制, —, (Song) Chen Fuliang 陳傅良

=== M ===
Meiqin shilun
Meiqin shilun 美芹十論, 1 juan, (Song) Xin Qiji 辛棄疾

=== P ===
Pingpi baijin fang
Pingpi baijin fang 洴澼百金方, 1 juan, (Qing) Huilu jiumin 惠麓酒民

=== Q ===
Quanshu
Quanshu 權書, 2 juan (Song) 蘇洵 Su Xun, in: Jiayou ji 嘉祐集 (ZGBSJC)

=== S ===
Sanshiliu ji
Sanshiliu ji 三十六計, 1 juan, (Qing) anonymous

Shoucheng lu
Shoucheng lu 守城錄, 4 juan, (Song) Chen Gui 陳規, Tang Shou 湯璹

Sima fa
Sima fa 司馬法, 1 juan, (Zhou) Sima Rangju 司馬穰苴 (?)

Sun Bin bingfa
Sun Bin bingfa 孫臏兵法, 1 juan, (Zhou) Sun Bin 孫臏

Sun Wu bingfa
Sun Wu bingfa 孫武兵法, see Sunzi bingfa 孫子兵法

Sunzi
Sunzi 孫子, see Sunzi bingfa 孫子兵法

Sunzi bingfa
Sunzi bingfa 孫子兵法 (Sunzi 孫子), 1 juan, (Zhou) Sun Wu 孫武

Sunzi shijia zhu
Sunzi shijia zhu 孫子十家注 (Shiyijia zhu Sunzi 十一家注孫子), 3 juan, (Song) Ji Tianbao 吉天保 (comp.)

=== T ===
Taibai yin jing
Taibai yin jing 太白陰經, 8 juan, (Tang) Li Quan 李筌

Taigong Liutao
Taigong Liutao 太公六韜, see Liutao 六韜

Tang Taizong Li Weigong wendui
Tang Taizong Li Weigong wendui (唐太宗) 李衛公問對, 3 juan, (Tang) Li Jing 李靖 (?)

Toubi futan
Toubi futan 投筆膚談, 1 juan, (Ming) Xihu yishi 西湖逸士

=== W ===
Wei Liaozi
Wei Liaozi 尉繚子, 5 juan, (Zhou) Wei Liao 尉繚

Wojijing
Wojijing (Woqijing) 握奇經, 1 juan, (Zhou) Fenghou 風后 (?); (Han) Gongsun Hong 公孫弘 (comm.); (Jin) Ma Long 馬隆 (arr.)

Wubian
Wubian 武編, 10 juan, (Ming) Tang Shunzhi 唐順之

Wubei zhi
Wubei zhi 武備志, 1 juan, (Ming) Mao Yuanyi 茅元儀

Wuji tanbing
Wuji tanbing 戊笈談兵, 1 juan, (Qing) Wang Fu 汪紱

Wujing
Wujing 武經, see Sunzi bingfa 孫子兵法

Wujing qishu
Wujing qishu 武經七書, (Song) imperial ord. (Jiang Ziya (Taigong)'s Six Secret Teachings; The Methods of the Sima (also known as Sima Rangju Art of War); Sun Tzu's The Art of War; Wu Qi's Wuzi; Wei Liaozi; Three Strategies of Huang Shigong; Questions and Replies between Tang Taizong and Li Weigong)

Wujing zongyao
Wujing zongyao 武經總要, 40 juan, (Song) Zeng Gongliang 曾公亮, Ding Du 丁度 (et al.)

Wuzi
Wuzi 吳子, 1 juan, (Zhou) Wu Qi 吳起

Xu wujing zongyao
Xu wujing zongyao 續武經總要, 1 juan, (Ming) Zhao Benxue 趙本學, Yu Dayou 俞大猷

=== Z ===
Zhenji
Zhenji 陣紀, 4 juan, (Ming) He Liangchen 何良臣

Zhiping shengsuan quanshu
Zhiping shengsuan quanshu 治平勝算全書, 1 juan, (Qing) Nian Gengyao 年羹堯

== See also ==
- School of the Military Strategists
- Zhongguo bingshu jicheng
- Zhongguo bingxue daxi
- Zhuzi jicheng
- List of military theorists and writers
- List of Chinese military texts
