= List of military writers =

The following is a list of military writers, alphabetical by last name:

== A ==
- Pierre Emmanuel Albert, Baron Ducasse
- Stephen Ambrose
- Raymond Aron

== B ==
- Andrew Bacevich
- Ali Bader Iraq war
- Bao Ninh – The Sorrow of War (about the Vietnam War)
- Thomas P.M. Barnett
- Alberto Bayo – Latin American revolutionary, A Manual of Guerrilla Warfare
- Marc Becker
- Antony Beevor – several books on the Second World War; also on the Spanish Civil War
- Don Bendell – Crossbow, The B-52 Overture, Valley of Tears, Snake-Eater, Criminal Investigation Detachment
- David Bercuson
- Friedrich von Bernhardi
- Eric Arthur Blair (aka George Orwell) – Homage to Catalonia
- Mark Bowden
- John Boyd – inventor of the OODA Loop or decision cycle, Energy-Maneuverability, Aerial Attack Study, "Discourse on Winning & Losing", Destruction & Creation
- Gary Brecher – War Nerd
- Ahron Bregman – books on the Arab–Israeli conflict
- Bernard Brodie
- Don Brown – Treason, Hostage, Defiance, Last Fighter Pilot, Malacca Conspiracy
- Philip Bujak - Historic Writing on subjects such as World War Two, Roman Province and more

== C ==
- Tobias Capwell (born c. 1973) – American curator, historian of arms and armour, and jouster
- Lazare Carnot
- Caleb Carr – military historian, Lessons of Terror, The Devil Soldier
- Nigel Cawthorne – POW histories: The Bamboo Cage, The Iron Cage
- Chanakya – Arthashastra
- Winston Churchill – The River War, The Gathering Storm
- Robert M. Citino – German Way of War, Quest for Decisive Victory, Blitzkrieg to Desert Storm, Death of the Wehrmacht: The German Campaigns of 1942, Wehrmacht Retreats: Fighting a Lost War, 1943
- Tom Clancy – Rainbow Six, Splinter Cell, Net Force
- Carl von Clausewitz – military theorist, On War
- Menno van Coehoorn
- John Colomb
- Julian Corbett – Edwardian British Naval theorist, Some Principles of Maritime Strategy
- Anthony Cordesman
- James Corum
- Martin van Creveld – expanded theory of war proponent
- Arthur Currie

== D ==
- Giulio Douhet
- Mikhail Dragomirov – Russian military theoretician
- Pierre Emmanuel Albert, Baron Ducasse
- Gwynne Dyer

== E ==
- Jacey Eckhart
- Jeff Edwards – Torpedo
- Stuart E. Eizenstat
- Alonso de Ercilla – La Araucana

== F ==
- Bernard Fall
- Edward S. Farrow –
- Ferdinand Foch – Des Principes de la Guerre (On the Principles of War) in 1903 and De la Conduite de la Guerre (On the Conduct of War) in 1904
- Frederick II of Prussia
- Sextus Julius Frontinus – Stratagemata
- J.F.C. Fuller – theoretician of tank warfare
- Paul Fussell

== G ==
- Pierre Marie Gallois
- Azar Gat
- Charles de Gaulle – Vers l'Armée de Métier (1934), La France et son Armée (1938) (partial bibliography of de Gaulle's military writings; influence of de Gaulle's military writings in Nazi Germany)
- David Glantz – preeminent authority on the Red Army during World War II
- Colmar Freiherr von der Goltz – 19th-century general and theorist
- Jack Granatstein
- Lester W. Grau
- George Grivas
- Heinz Guderian – German general, developed principles of Blitzkrieg, Achtung – Panzer!
- Ernesto Che Guevara – Argentinian revolutionary, diary outlined the guerrilla war being fought in Bolivia. Guerrilla Warfare
- Jacques-Antoine-Hippolyte de Guibert

== H ==
- David Hackworth
- Bruce Barrymore Halpenny – Airfields, World War Two, Bomber and Fighter Command
- Thomas X. Hammes
- Victor Davis Hanson
- Gustav Hasford
- Joel Hayward
- Herodotus
- Jonathan House
- Sir Michael Howard

== I ==
- Kanji Ishiwara – Sekai Saishū Senron (On World Final War)

== J ==
- Jiang Ziya – Six Secret Teachings
- Michael Johns – foreign policy and national security analyst and writer
- Antoine Henri Jomini – General, wrote on the Napoleonic Wars including Precis de l'Art de la Guerre (Precis on the Art of War) and Traité des grandes opérations militaires (Treatise on Grand Military Operations)
- Josephus – The Wars of the Jews
- Ernst Jünger – Storm of Steel

== K ==
- Herman Kahn
- Philip Kay-Bujak - Military biographer
- John Keegan – military historian
- Paul Kennedy
- David Kilcullen
- Howard Kippenberger – New Zealand general and military historian
- Henry Kissinger
- Shen Kuo – Dream Pool Essays

== L ==
- John Knox Laughton
- T. E. Lawrence – author of Seven Pillars of Wisdom, colloquially known as "Lawrence of Arabia"
- Leo VI the Wise – Byzantine emperor (Taktika)
- "Yank" Levy – author of pamphlet Guerrilla Warfare
- John David Lewis
- B. H. Liddell-Hart – proponent of the "indirect approach"
- William S. Lind
- Liu Bowen – Huolongjing
- Stephen B. Luce
- Edward Luttwak – theorist, identified the 'Dynamic Paradox' of strategy

== M ==
- Douglas Macgregor
- Niccolò Machiavelli – political theorist, The Prince and Dell'arte della guerra (The Art of War)
- Alfred Thayer Mahan – naval strategist
- Dennis Hart Mahan – military theorist and Engineering professor at West Point, wrote Advanced Guard, Outpost and Detachment Service of Troops, with essential Principles of Strategy and Grand Tactics, commonly known as Outpost
- Stepan Makarov – Russian vice admiral, innovator, naval strategist
- Erich von Manstein – prominent German general in World War II
- Mao Zedong – Chinese leader and guerrilla theorist, On Guerrilla Warfare
- Carlos Marighella – Brazilian "urban guerrilla", Minimanual of the Urban Guerrilla
- Tyrone G. Martin – USS Constitution expert
- Maurice – Byzantine Emperor and traditional author of the military treatise Strategikon
- Frederick Maurice – soldier, military writer
- Maurice of Nassau
- Gordon McCormick – theorist on the "Magic Diamond" model of counter-insurgency
- Steven Metz
- Billy Mitchell
- Helmuth von Moltke the Elder – theorist and strategist; "father" of mission-type tactics and the German field manual for unit commanders
- François-Henri de Montmorency
- Robin Moore – The Hunt for Bin Laden: Task Force Dagger
- Miyamoto Musashi – The Book of Five Rings

== N ==
- Napoleon I of France
- Abdul Haris Nasution
- Sönke Neitzel – author of Soldaten: On Fighting, Killing and Dying
- Michel Ney

== O ==
- Weston Ochse

== P ==
- Sarah C. Paine
- Mason Patrick – Major General, Chief of US Army Air Service and US Army Air Corps, The US in the air
- Ralph Peters
- Ardant du Picq – French military theorist, Battle Studies
- Lucien Poirier
- Polyaenus
- H. John Poole
- Douglas Porch

== R ==
- Sima Rangju – The Methods of the Sima
- Publius Flavius Vegetius Renatus – De Re Militari
- Erwin Rommel – German field marshal during World War II, Infantry Attacks (Infanterie greift an), armored battle theory
- Cornelius Ryan – The Longest Day, A Bridge Too Far, The Last Battle

== S ==
- Philip Sabin
- Thomas Schelling
- Sigismund von Schlichting – 19th-century infantry theorist
- Ayesha Siddiqa
- Lynette Silver
- Richard Simpkin – military theorist
- Thomas Smith
- Vasily Sokolovsky
- David Stahel – military historian with a focus on Operation Barbarossa and the Battle of Moscow
- Hew Strachan – military historian
- Sun Bin – claimed descent from Sun Tzu, and was considered Sun Tzu II, Sun Bin Bing Fa
- Sun Tzu – general, The Art of War
- Alexander Suvorov – general, The Science of Victory (Russian: Наука побеждать)

== T ==
- Aeneas Tacticus
- A.J.P. Taylor
- Wallace Terry
- Thucydides – History of the Peloponnesian War
- Eduard Totleben
- Hugh Trenchard
- Yamamoto Tsunetomo – Hagakure
- Barbara Tuchman – historian
- Mikhail Tukhachevsky

== U ==
- Matthew Uttley

== V ==
- Sebastien le Prestre de Vauban
- Vegetius
- Julius von Verdy du Vernois – 19th-century general and theorist
- Võ Nguyên Giáp – Vietnamese general who played a key role in the First Indochina War and later the Vietnam War. Known for his role at the Battle of Dien Ben Phu and the Battle of Khe Sanh. Some of his works include Big Victory, Great Task; People's Army, People's War; Ðiện Biên Phủ; and We Will Win.

== W ==
- Wang Li – the Master of Ghost Valley
- H. G. Wells
- Bing West – military historian
- Gordon Williamson (writer) military reference books
- Garnet Wolseley
- Wu Qi – Wuzi

== X ==
- Xenophon – Anabasis and Hellenica
- Wang Xiangsui – Unrestricted Warfare

== Y ==
- Jiao Yu

== Z ==
- Zhuge Liang – strategist from The Three Kingdoms era, The General's Garden

== See also ==
- Lists of authors
- Military history
- List of authors in war – writers who served in and wrote about war, including memoirs and fiction
- List of Chinese military texts
