= List of Chinese military texts =

Chinese military texts have existed ever since Chinese civilization was founded. China's armies have long benefited from this rich strategic tradition, influenced by texts such as Sun Tzu's The Art of War, that have deeply influenced military thought. Although traditional Chinese Confucian philosophy favoured peaceful political solutions and showed contempt for brute military force, the military was influential in most Chinese states. The works of well known strategists such as Sun Tzu and Sun Bin have heavily influenced military philosophy, warfare, and political discourse throughout China's long history. Works such as The Art of War have also found a strong following around the world, where they have influenced people as far ranging as the Chinese Communist Party and the former Secretary of Defense Donald Rumsfeld.

== Overview ==
The most well known of these military texts are the Seven Military Classics. The texts were canonized under this name during the 11th century AD, and from the Song dynasty onwards were included in most military encyclopedias. For imperial officers, either some or all of the works were required reading to merit promotion, analogous to the requirement for all bureaucrats to study and become familiar with Confucius' work. There were many anthologies with different notations and analyses by scholars throughout the centuries leading up to the present versions in Western publishing. Members of the Chinese Communist Party also studied the texts during the Chinese Civil War as well as many European and American military minds.

== Military texts ==
=== Seven Military Classics ===
Name	Authors	Content	Dynasty	Date	Origin	Image	Description
The Art of War (Chinese: 孫子兵法; pinyin: Sūnzǐ Bīngfǎ)	Sun Tzu	The Art of War is composed of 13 chapters, each of which is devoted to one aspect of warfare. Sun Tzu focuses on the importance of positioning in strategy and that position is affected both by objective conditions in the physical environment and the subjective opinions of competitive actors in that environment.	Spring and Autumn period (possibly the Warring States period.) )	unknown, c. 6th century BC	State of Wu		The beginning of The Art of War, in a "classical" bamboo book from the reign of the Qianlong Emperor.
The Methods of the Sima (Chinese: 司馬法; pinyin: Sīmǎ Fǎ)	Sima Rangju	A text discussing laws, regulations, government policies, military organization, military administration, discipline, basic values, grand strategy, and strategy.	Warring States period	4th century BC	State of Qi	-	-
Six Secret Strategic Teachings (Chinese: 六韬; pinyin: Liùtāo)	Jiāng Zǐyá,	A treatise on military strategy divided into six chapters, six types of ways to engage in war.	Zhou dynasty	11th century BC	State of Zhou (modern day Shaanxi)		Portrait of Jiang Ziya from the Sancai Tuhui.
Wei Liaozi (Chinese: 尉繚子; pinyin: Wèi Liáozi)	Wei Liao	A treatise that advocates both a civil and military approach to affairs. It advocates emphasis on agriculture and people as the two greatest resources of the state. The text centers around a government based on humanistic values, with the ruler as the paradigm of virtue in the state. Heterodoxy and other values not conducive to the state should be punished using draconian measures.	Warring States period	4th–3rd century BC	State of Qin	-	-
Wuzi (Chinese: wiktionary:吳子; pinyin: Wuzi)	Wu Qi	The present text of the Wuzi consists of six sections, each focusing on a critical aspect of military affairs: Planning for the State; Evaluating the Enemy; Controlling the Army; the Tao of the General; Responding to Change; and, Stimulating the Officers.	Warring States period	During Wu Qi's lifetime (440-381 BC)	State of Wei	-	-
Three Strategies of Huang Shigong (Chinese: 黄石公三略; pinyin: Huáng Shígōng Sān Lǜe)	Unknown; attributed to Jiang Ziya and various other authors	The treastise is organized into three sections, which can be interpreted as a hierarchy of importance or as simple indicators of position in the work. The work itself states that all three types of strategy are necessary for different styles of government. Much of the work is concerned with administrative control, but some important tactical concepts are also developed. Generals are placed in a high position, and must be unquestioned once they assume command. Attacks should be swift and decisive.	Warring States period	Unknown; attributed to various time periods	Unknown; attributed to various origins	-	-
Questions and Replies between Tang Taizong and Li Weigong (Chinese: 唐太宗李 衛 公 問 對; pinyin: Táng Tàizōng Lǐ wèigōng Wènduì)	Emperor Taizong and Li Jing	A dialogue between Emperor Taizong of the Tang dynasty and Li Jing, a prominent general of that dynasty. It discusses matters of military strategy.	Tang dynasty	7th century	State of Tang		A painting portraying Tang Taizong by painter Yan Liben

=== Others ===
Name	Authors	Content	Dynasty	Date	Origin	Image	Description
Sun Bin's Art of War (Chinese: 孫臏兵法; pinyin: Sūnbìn Bīngfǎ)	Sun Bin (孫臏)	The treastise contains 89 extensive chapters, with four volumes of pictures attached.	Warring States period.	4th century BCE	Qi state	-	-
Thirty-Six Stratagems (Chinese: 三十六計; pinyin: Sānshíliù Jì)	Unknown; attributed to various	A text used to illustrate a series of stratagems used in politics, war, as well as in civil interaction, often through unorthodox or deceptive means	Unknown; attributed to various	Unknown; attributed to various	Unknown; attributed to various		A page from a Ming dynasty edition of the Book of Qi, from which the name of the Thirty-Six Stratagems comes from.
Wujing Zongyao (Chinese: 武經總要; pinyin: Wǔjīng Zǒngyào; Wade–Giles: Wu Ching Tsung Yao; lit. 'Collection of the Most Important Military Techniques')	Zeng Gongliang (曾公亮), Ding Du (丁度), and Yang Weide (楊惟德)	The text is a Chinese military compendium, covering a wide range of subjects, everything from naval warships to different types of catapults.	Northern Song dynasty	1044 CE	Northern Song state		An illustration of the Wujing Zongyao showing a Chinese Song dynasty naval river ship with a Xuanfeng traction-trebuchet catapult on its top deck.
The General's Garden (simplified Chinese: 将苑; traditional Chinese: 將苑; pinyin: Jiàng Yuàn)	Zhuge Liang (諸葛亮)	A short text plagiarising earlier military treatises, falsely attributed to Zhuge Liang.	Song dynasty	12th century	Song state		Part of a 12th-century manuscript scroll of the Tangut translation of The General's Garden .
Huolongjing (simplified Chinese: 火龙经; traditional Chinese: 火龍經; pinyin: Huǒ Lóng Jīng Wade-Giles: Huo Lung Ching)	Jiao Yu (焦玉) and Liu Bowen (劉基)	A treastise that outlines the use of various 'fire–weapons' involving the use of gunpowder. It discusses various gunpowder compositions, bombs, fire arrows, rocket launchers, land mines, naval mines, proto–guns, fire lances, bombards and cannons.	Ming dynasty	14th century	Ming state		Huolongjing depicting the 'Flying Crow with Magic Fire', an aerodynamic winged rocket bomb.
Jixiao Xinshu (Chinese: 紀效新書)	Qi Jiguang (戚繼光)	A text in which Qi Jiguang writes about strategy, armed and unarmed fighting and many other aspects of warfare.	Ming dynasty	1561 CE	Ming state		Painting of Qi Jiguang, author of Jixiao Xinshu.
Records of Armaments and Military Provisions (Chinese: 武備志)	Mao Yuanyi (茅元儀)	A military encyclopaedia of strategies, tactics, formations, training, logistics, and weapons.	Ming dynasty	1621 CE	Ming state		Illustration of a platformed crossbow from Records of Armaments and Military Provisions.

== See also ==
- School of the Military Strategists

== Sources ==
- Sun, Tzu, The Art of War, Translated by Sam B. Griffith (2006), Blue Heron Books, ISBN 1-897035-35-7
- Needham, Joseph (1986). Science and Civilization in China: Volume 5, Chemistry and Chemical Technology, Part 7, Military Technology; the Gunpowder Epic. Taipei: Caves Books Ltd.
