= School of the Military Strategists =

Classical Chinese school of thought

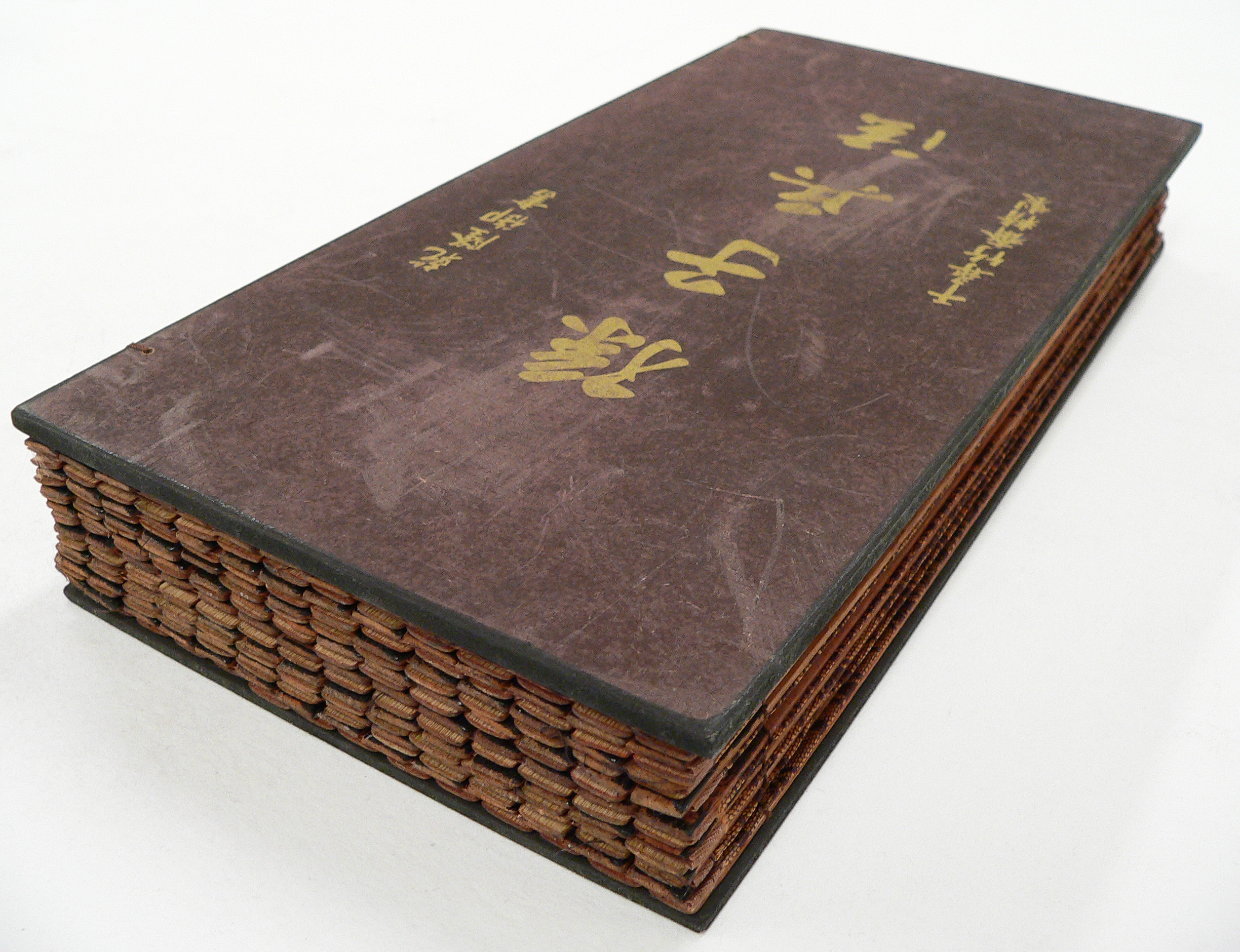
A Chinese bamboo book, closed to display the cover. This copy of The Art of War (on the cover, "孫子兵法") by Sun Tzu is part of a collection at the University of California, Riverside.

The School of the Military Strategists (Chinese: 兵家; pinyin: bīngjiā; Wade–Giles: ping-chia), also called the Military School, School of Military, or Military School of Thought among other names, was a school active in ancient Chinese philosophy from the Spring and Autumn period to the early Western Han dynasty. It primarily focused on military activities and the study of military principles and theories. Notable representatives of the school include Sun Wu (Sunzi), Sima Rangju from the Spring and Autumn period, Sun Bin, Wu Qi, Wei Liao, and Bai Qi from the Warring States period, as well as Zhang Liang and Han Xin from the early Western Han dynasty.

Its main works include Sunzi's Art of War (Sunzi bingfa 孫子兵法), Wuzi (Wuzi 吳子), and Sun Bin on the Art of War (Sun Bin bingfa 孙膑兵法).

In the category of Masters and Philosophers (zibu 子部), the third of the four traditional categories (sibu 四部) into which Chinese literature was divided, the school ranks second in the Siku quanshu (四庫全書), just after the Confucian school.

== See also ==
- Seven Military Classics
- Zhuzi jicheng
- Nine Schools of Thought
- Hundred Schools of Thought

== Bibliography ==
- 汉英中国哲学辞典. Kaifeng 2002
