= Collection of Chinese Military Texts =

Collection of Chinese Military Texts (simplified Chinese: 中国兵书集成; traditional Chinese: 中國兵書集成; pinyin: Zhōngguó bīngshū jíchéng; Wade–Giles: Chung-kuo ping-shu chi-ch'eng) is a Chinese congshu series compiling works on warfare and military strategy.

The series was published between 1987 and 1998 as a joint effort by the People's Liberation Army Publishing House (解放軍出版社) in Beijing and the Liao-Shen Press (遼沈書社) in Shenyang, Liaoning. It contains a selection of many texts, arranged chronologically, across 50 volumes (ce 册). The 51st volume includes a postscript (houji) and an index (mulu).

The series was edited by Liu Lumin (刘鲁民) and others. It contains valuable writings on military affairs from the Zhou and Qin dynasties through the end of the Qing dynasty and into the Republican period, including chapters on soldiering drawn from various canonical texts.

== See also ==
- Seven Military Classics
- List of military theorists and writers
