= Chinese People's Liberation Army Press =

Chinese military publishing company

The Chinese People's Liberation Army Press (PLA Press, simplified Chinese: 中国人民解放军出版社; traditional Chinese: 中國人民解放軍出版社; pinyin: Zhōngguó Rénmín Jiěfàngjūn Chūbǎnshè), located in Beijing, is a comprehensive publishing house under the Chinese People's Liberation Army News and Communication Center.

The PLA Press is the largest military publishing house in China. Mao Zedong, Deng Xiaoping, Jiang Zemin, and Hu Jintao had written book titles and publishing names for the publishing house, or had important works and books published there. The publishing house has four brands: the "Chinese People's Liberation Army Press", the "PLA Literature and Art Publishing House", the "Kunlun Publishing House", and the "Changhong Publishing Company".

== History ==
In June 1948, the Fourth Bureau of the Chinese Communist Party's Central Military Commission was established.

In June 1950, The Fourth Bureau was renamed the "Military Publishing Bureau of the Military Training Department of the General Staff". In July 1952, The Publishing Bureau was renamed the "Military Publishing Bureau of the General Staff". On April 21, 1955, it was renamed the "Military Publishing Department of the General Training Management". On December 11, 1958, it was renamed the "Military Publishing Department of the General Staff". On January 18, 1963, it was renamed as the "General Staff Publishing Bureau".

In December 1966, the "Chinese People's Liberation Army Soldiers Publishing House" was established by merging the General Staff Publishing Bureau and the General Political Department's "Sparks of Fire" editorial department and the editorial team of the literary and art series. In December 1983, with the approval of the Central Military Commission, the Chinese People's Liberation Army Soldiers Publishing House was renamed the "Chinese People's Liberation Army Publishing House".

In June 1951, the "Liberation Army Literature and Art" magazine was founded. After the outbreak of the Cultural Revolution, the magazine was discontinued. In 1972, "Liberation Army Literature and Art" was resumed and the PLA Literature and Art editorial office was established. In 1983, the PLA Literature and Art editorial office was renamed the PLA Literature and Art Publishing House. In 1984, the PLA Literature and Art Publishing House registered and started using the "Kunlun Publishing House" brand.

In September 1992, with the approval of the Central Military Commission, the Chinese People's Liberation Army Publishing House and the PLA Literature and Art Publishing House merged into the Chinese People's Liberation Army Publishing House. In February 1994, the two publishing houses were restored. In October 2003, the two were merged again to form the "Chinese People's Liberation Army Press".

In 2009, the Chinese People's Liberation Army Press was rated as a first-class publishing house and one of the top 100 book publishing units in the country by the General Administration of Press and Publication.

In 2018, the former PLA Television Propaganda Center, the Central Military Commission Political Work Department Network Center, the PLA Press, the PLA Newspaper and other units were merged to form the PLA News and Communication Center. The People's Liberation Army Press got the full name of the "People's Liberation Army News and Communication Center Press". The former PLA Audio-Visual Publishing House was transferred to the PLA News and Communication Center Press.

== Publication areas ==
Chinese People's Liberation Army Press publishes books and audio video products on military, culture, politics and army education. The books "Sparks Spreading Across the Prairie", "Bitter Cabbage Flowers", "Guardians Behind Enemy Lines", and "Drawing the Sword", etc. have produced large historical influence in China.

== Magazines ==
Chinese People's Liberation Army Press publishes three magazines: "PLA Literature and Art", "PLA Life" and "Party’s Life in the Army".

- PLA Literature and Art: Founded in 1951. Managed by the Propaganda Department of the General Political Department of the PLA, and hosted by the PLA Press. After the deepening of the national defense and military reform in 2016, it was changed to be supervised by the Propaganda Bureau of the Political Work Department of the Central Military Commission and sponsored by the PLA Press.
- PLA Life: Founded in 1985. Under the supervision of the Propaganda Department of the General Political Department of the People's Liberation Army and sponsored by the PLA Press. It is the only comprehensive monthly magazine in the entire army that mainly reflects the life of the army and soldiers. After the deepening of the national defense and military reform in 2016, it was changed to be sponsored by the PLA Press.
- Party’s Life in the Army: Trial issue on December 9, 2007, officially launched in January 2008. Managed by the Propaganda Department of the General Political Department of the PLA, guided by the Organization Department of the General Political Department of the PLA, and hosted by the PLA Press. It is the only party-building magazine in the entire army that is open to the public inside and outside the military. After the deepening of the reform of national defense and the military in 2016, it was changed to be managed by the Propaganda Bureau of the Central Military Commission Political Work Department and hosted by the PLA Press.

== Honours ==
The books published by the Chinese People's Liberation Army Press have won many important awards such as the "Five One Project" Award of the Central Propaganda Department, the China Book Award, the Mao Dun Literature Award, and the Lu Xun Literature Award. The magazines sponsored by the publishing house have won the China National Journal Award. More than 500 books and audio-visual products have won various national and military awards.

== See also ==
- Zhongguo bingshu jicheng
