= Pierre Emmanuel Albert, Baron Ducasse =

Pierre-Emmanuel-Albert, Baron du Casse (also Ducasse; 16 November 1813 – 14 March 1893) was a French soldier and military historian born at Bourges. He is best known for being the first editor of the correspondence of Napoleon I. He often published as Albert Du Casse.

In 1849 he became aide-de-camp to Prince Jérôme Bonaparte, ex-king of Westphalia, then governor of the Invalides, on whose commission he wrote Mémoires pour servir a l'histoire de la campagne de 1812 en Russie (1852). Subsequently, he published Mémoires du roi Joseph (1853–1855), and, as a sequel, Histoire des négotiations diplomatiques relatives aux traits de Morfontaine, de Lunéville et d'Amiens, together with the unpublished correspondence of the emperor Napoleon I with Cardinal Fesch (1855–1856). From papers in the possession of the imperial family he compiled Mémoires du prince Eugene (1858–1860) and Réfutation des Mémoires du duc de Raguse (1857), part of which was inserted by authority at the end of volume ix of the Mémoires.

He was attached to Jerome's son, Prince Napoleon, during the Crimean War, and wrote a Précis historique des operations militaires en Orient, de mars 1854 a octobre 1855 (1857), which was completed many years later by a volume entitled La Crimée et Sebastopol de 1853 a 1856, docusnentl intiines et indits, followed by the complete list of the French officers killed or wounded in that war (1892). He was also employed by Prince Napoleon on the Correspondence of Napoleon I, and afterwards published certain letters, purposely omitted there, in the Revue historique. These documents, subsequently collected in Les Rois fréres de Napoleon (1883), as well as the Journal de la reine Catherine de Westphalie (1893), were edited with little care and are not entirely trustworthy, but their publication threw much light on Napoleon I and his entourage. His Souvenirs d'un officier du le Zouaves, and Les Dessous du coup d'état (1891), contain many piquant anecdotes, but at times degenerate into mere tittle-tattle. Ducasse was the author of some slight novels, and from the practice of this form of literature he acquired that levity which appears even in his most serious historical publications.
