= Wang Cheng =

Song dynasty historian and politician

- Died: c. 1200
- Occupation: Historian
- Relatives: Wang Shang (王賞), father
- Writing career
- Notable work: Dongdu Shilüe

Chinese name
- Traditional Chinese: 王稱
- Simplified Chinese: 王称
Transcriptions
Standard Mandarin
- Hanyu Pinyin: Wáng Chēng

Wang Jiping
- Chinese: 王季平
Transcriptions
Standard Mandarin
- Hanyu Pinyin: Wáng Jìpíng

Wang Cheng (died c. 1200), courtesy name Jiping, was a Song dynasty historian who authored the monumental history book Dongdu Shilüe. He also published 4 volumes of poetry which are no longer extant.

== Biography ==
Wang Cheng's ancestral home was Mei Prefecture, but since his father Wang Shang (王賞) and grandfather Wang Huai (王淮) were both officials, it's unlikely Wang Cheng was born there. His father Wang Shang worked in the editorial office for the Veritable Records in 1142–1143 and had access to a lot of government information, which was an important source for Wang Cheng's Dongdu Shilüe. In 1178, historian Hong Mai submitted a memorial to Emperor Xiaozong in which he recommended Dongdu Shilüe as highly valuable for his compilation of the National History of Four Emperors (四朝國史). Emperor Xiaozong then granted Wang Cheng an office in Long Prefecture as a Gentleman for Discussion (承議郎).
