= Dongdu Shilüe =

- Author: Wang Cheng
- Language: Classical Chinese
- Subject: history of the Song dynasty
- Publication date: 1186
- Publication place: Song dynasty

Dongdu Shilüe
- Traditional Chinese: 東都事略
- Simplified Chinese: 东都事略
Transcriptions
Standard Mandarin
- Hanyu Pinyin: Dōngdū Shìlüè
- Wade–Giles: Tung-tu shih-lüeh

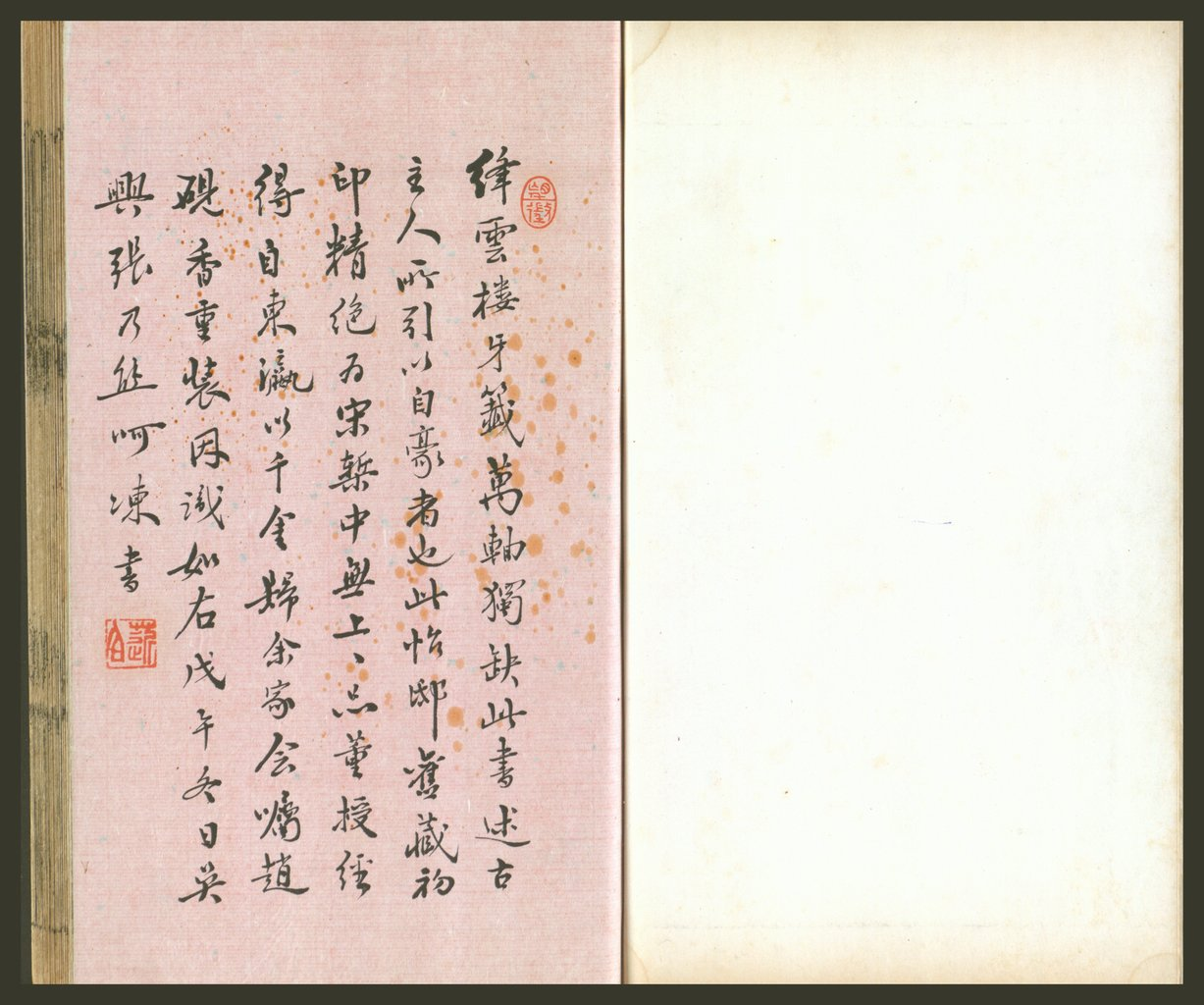
A scan of a Dongdu ShiLue page

Dongdu Shilüe ("Summary of Events in the Eastern Capital") is an 1186 Chinese book chronicling the Northern Song dynasty (960–1126) history, written by Wang Cheng, a Southern Song official in the historiographic compilation bureau. It was so titled because Song's "Eastern Capital" Kaifeng had fallen to the Jin dynasty since the Jingkang incident in 1127.

Much of the information appears to be compiled by Wang Cheng's father Wang Shang (王賞), who worked in the editorial office for the Veritable Records during 1142–43.

== Contents ==
The book contains 130 chapters (卷):

- Chapters 1–12: annals of emperors (帝紀), one chapter each for every Northern Song emperor (from Emperor Taizu of Song to Emperor Qinzong)
- Chapters 13–17: biographies of imperial relatives (世家)
- Chapters 18–122: biographies (列傳), including the empresses
- Chapters 123–130: supplementary monographs (附錄) about foreign countries: 2 chapters each for Liao dynasty, Jin dynasty, and Western Xia, and 1 chapter each for Tibet (Gusiluo regime) and Đại Việt (Ngô dynasty, Đinh dynasty, Early Lê dynasty, and Lý dynasty)
