= Huang-Song Shichao Gangyao =

1213 historical book by Li Zhi

The Huang-Song Shichao Gangyao (Chinese: 皇宋十朝綱要; lit. 'Outline of the Ten Reigns of the Great Song') is a Chinese historical book written by Li Zhi (李𡌴; 1161–1238) in 1213, which outlines the history of the Song dynasty from 960 to 1162. This book is highly rated by most modern scholars of the Song dynasty.

== Contents ==
- Ch. 1: Emperor Taizu of Song
- Ch. 2: Emperor Taizong of Song
- Ch. 3: Emperor Zhenzong of Song
- Ch. 4–6: Emperor Renzong of Song
- Ch. 7: Emperor Yingzong of Song
- Ch. 8–10: Emperor Shenzong of Song
- Ch. 11–14: Emperor Zhezong of Song
- Ch. 15–18: Emperor Huizong of Song
- Ch. 19: Emperor Qinzong of Song
- Ch. 20–25: Emperor Gaozong of Song

For each emperor, the author begins with a brief account of the emperor's titles, family members, and important ministers, as well as the imperial examination graduates and changes to geographical names during his reign. This is followed by a chronological account of important political events during his reign.
