= Jacey Eckhart =

American born military life journalist

Jacey Eckhart is a military life consultant based in Washington, DC. She is a nationally syndicated military columnist and author of several publications.

== Biography ==
Eckhart wrote over 400 newspaper columns for The Virginian-Pilot, in Norfolk, Virginia, using her knowledge and experience with military life. She wrote the book The Homefront Club: the Hardheaded Woman's Guide to Raising a Military Family to help spouses going through the different aspects of the life they have found themselves married into.

She has also voiced the CD These Boots: A Spouse's Guide to Stepping Up and Standing Tall during Deployment. She continues to write a column for Operation Homefront, on their website. She continues to speak at different engagements, across the country, inspiring military spouses. She is a member of the National Speakers Association and the American Society for Training and Development.

Eckhart was selected as one of the most influential military spouses in the country by Military Spouse magazine.

== Works ==
- Jacey Eckhart (2005). The Homefront Club: The Hardheaded Woman's Guide To Raising A Military Family. Naval Institute Press. ISBN 978-1591142287.
