= Li Fang (Song dynasty) =

Chinese Song dynasty scholar and official (925-996)

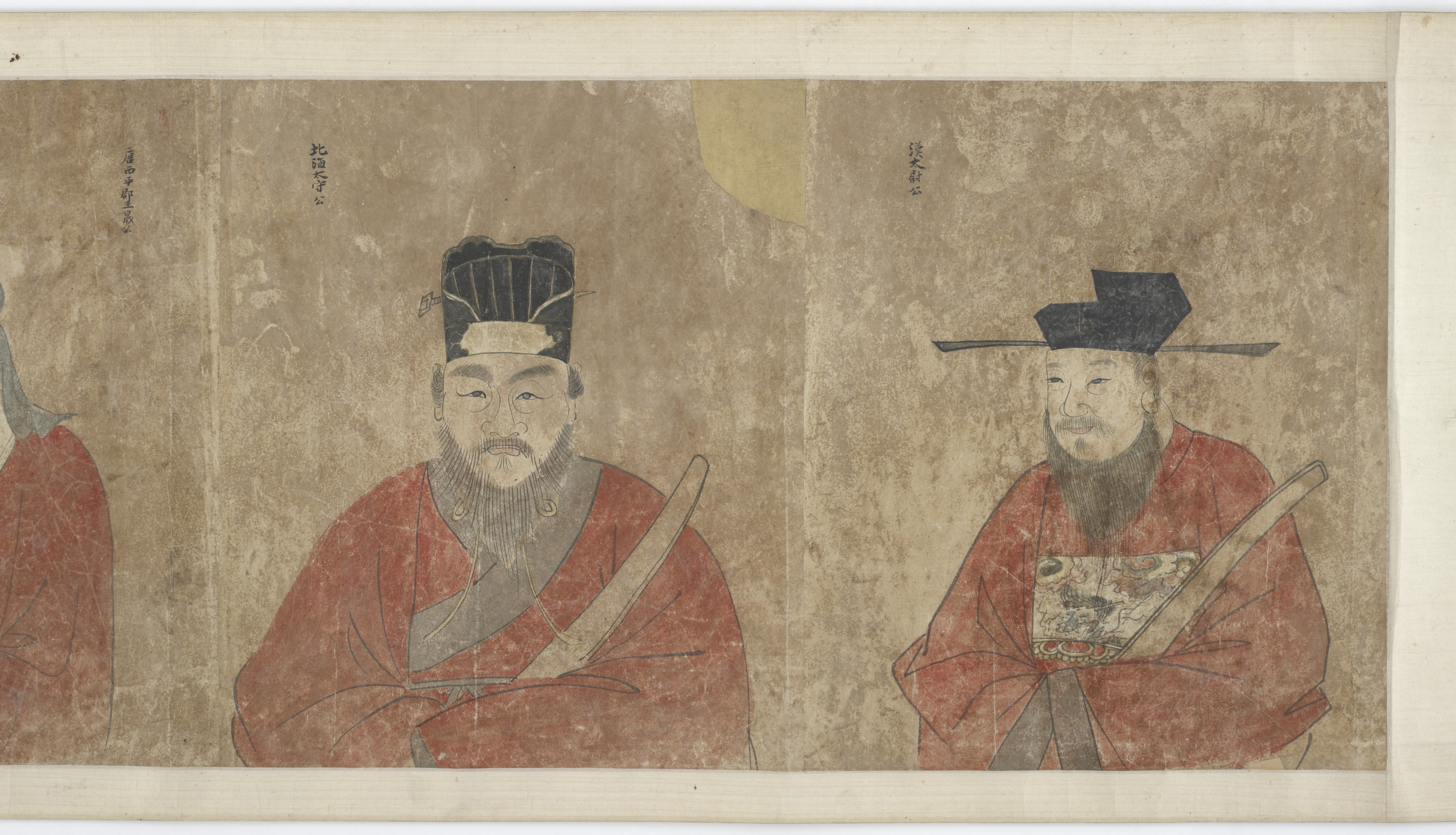
- Spouse: Fu Shi
- Children: Li Zongne, Li Zonge, Li Zongliang, Li Zonghui
- Parents: Li Chao (father); Xie Shi (mother)

Li Fang
- Chinese: 李昉
Transcriptions
Standard Mandarin
- Hanyu Pinyin: Lǐ Fǎng
- Wade–Giles: Li Fang

Courtesy name
- Chinese: 明远
- Literal meaning: Bright-&-Distant
Transcriptions
Standard Mandarin
- Hanyu Pinyin: Míngyuǎn
- Wade–Giles: Ming-yüan

Li Fang (AD 925–996), courtesy name Mingyuan, was a Chinese scholar and bureaucrat of the Song Dynasty, who served as an editor for three of the Four Great Books of Song. He was born in what is now Hengshui, Hebei, and once served the Later Han and Later Zhou.
