= The General's Garden =

Chinese military treatise

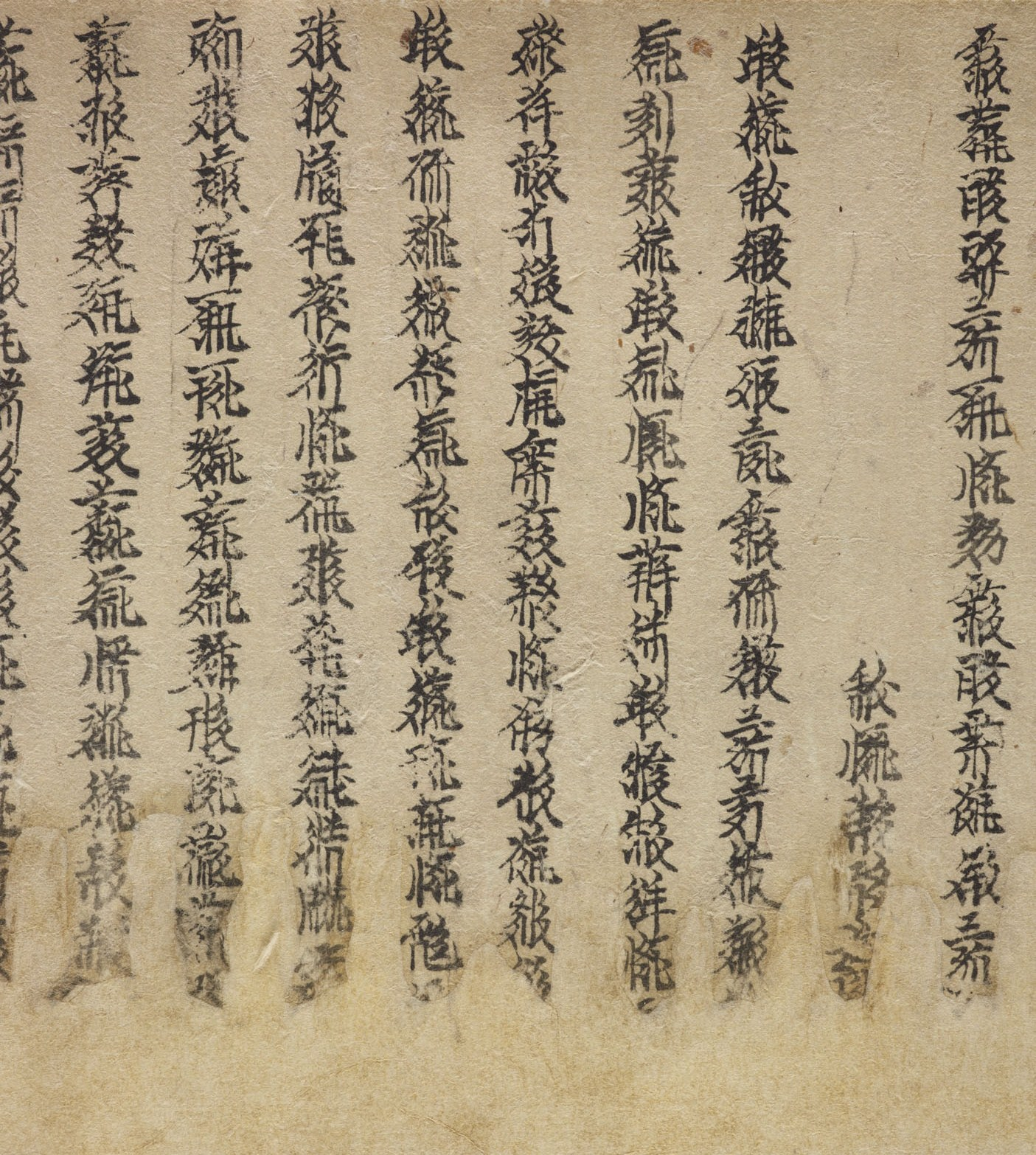
Section of the 12th century Tangut translation of the General's Garden (British Library Or.12380/1840).

The General's Garden (Chinese: 將苑; pinyin: Jiàng Yuàn), also known as the Book of the Heart (Chinese: 心書; pinyin: Xīn Shū) or the New Book (Chinese: 新書; pinyin: Xīn Shū), is an ancient Chinese military treatise attributed to the famous Three Kingdoms period military strategist Zhuge Liang (181–234).

== History ==
Although the authorship of the book is attributed to Zhuge Liang, the book is not recorded prior to the Song dynasty (960–1279), and it is generally considered to be a forgery written during the Northern Song period (960–1127). No Song dynasty editions survive, and the earliest surviving editions date to the Ming dynasty (1368–1644). Editions dating to 1517, 1564 and 1637 are known, of which the 1637 edition has a colophon dated 1485. The text was republished several times during the Qing dynasty (1644–1911). A scholarly edition of the text was edited by Zhang Shu (Chinese: 张澍; pinyin: Zhāng Shù) (1781–1847), and a punctuated version of Zhang Shu's edition was published in China in 1960.

The Ming editions of the text comprise fifty sections, but the last four sections, relating to the "barbarians" of the north (Beidi), south (Nanman), east (Dongyi) and west (Xirong), are omitted from most Qing dynasty editions. This omission is thought to have been made in order to avoid offending the Manchu rulers of the Qing dynasty.

== Tangut translation ==
Although the earliest surviving editions of the General's Garden only date back to the Ming dynasty, a unique manuscript of a translation of the text into the Tangut language was collected from the abandoned fortress city of Khara-Khoto by Aurel Stein in 1914, and is currently held at the British Library in London. This translation was probably made during the second half of the 12th century or the early 13th century, and thus predates the earliest extant Chinese editions by some 200 years.

The Tangut translation differs from the Chinese version in two important respects. Firstly, the Tangut text is divided into thirty-seven sections, omitting more than ten sections compared with the Chinese text, which comprises fifty sections. It is not certain whether this difference is due to the Song dynasty source for the translation having fewer sections than the later version of the text, or whether the Tangut translator deliberately omitted sections that were not considered relevant to the situation of the Western Xia. The other major difference is the treatment of the final four sections of the text, relating to the "barbarians" of the four directions, which is reduced to a single section describing only the barbarians of the north, called the "Lords of the Steppes" in the Tangut translation. This probably reflects the different geopolitical situation of the Western Xia state compared with the Chinese state.

== See also ==
- List of Chinese military texts
