= Zeng Gongliang =

Chinese politician

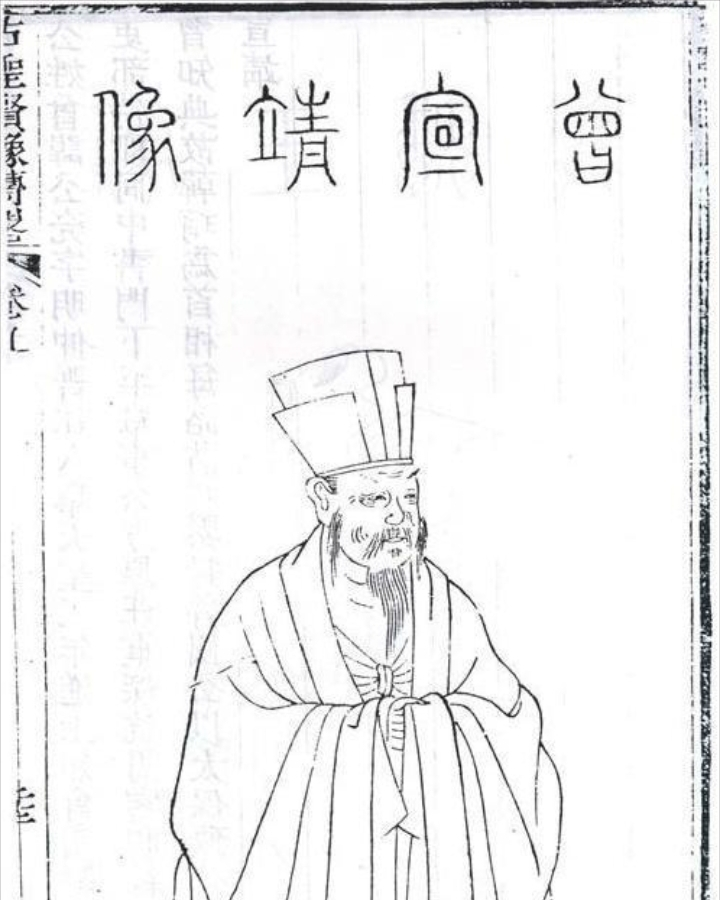

Zeng Gongliang (曾公亮, Tseng Kung-Liang; Pe̍h-ōe-jī: Chan Kong-liāng; 998–1078) was a Chinese scholar of the Song dynasty, who helped write the Wujing Zongyao.
