= Wuzi =

Book by Wu Qi

- Traditional Chinese: 吳子
- Simplified Chinese: 吴子
- Literal meaning: Master Wu
Transcriptions
Standard Mandarin
- Hanyu Pinyin: Wúzǐ
- Wade–Giles: Wu^{2}-tzŭ^{3}
- IPA: [ú.tsì]
Middle Chinese
- Middle Chinese: /ŋuo t͡sɨ^{X}/
Old Chinese
- Zhengzhang: /*ŋʷaː ʔslɯʔ/

The Wuzi is a classic Chinese work on military strategy attributed to Wu Qi. It is considered one of China's Seven Military Classics.

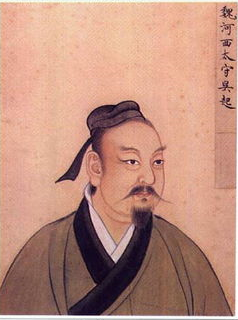
Portrait of Wu Qi

Pages from a Ming dynasty printed edition of Wuzi

It is said there were two books on the art of war by Wu Qi, but one was lost, hence leaving the Wuzi as the only existing book carrying Wu Qi's military thoughts. The oldest extant published Wuzi edition that survives dates to the Song dynasty (960–1279). Because of the lack of surviving copies, there is no consensus among modern scholars concerning the latest date of the Wuzi's final composition, but the core of the work is nominally assumed to have been composed around Wu Qi's lifetime (440–381 BC), in the mid-Warring States period. Historical references indicate that the Wuzi was very famous and popular in both the Warring States period and in the Han dynasty. In addition to strategic/tactical studies and the philosophy of war, the Wuzi pays significant attention to the logistical achievement of war preparedness.

The philosophical content of the work mainly consists of a synthesis between Confucianism and Legalism. The work attempts to resolve a humanistic (Confucian) concern for moral values and benevolent government with an administrative (Legalist) need for strict, predictable rewards and punishments. The attempted synthesis between Confucian and Legalist values is common to other military treatises dated more conclusively to the Warring States period.

== Military theory ==
The present text of the Wuzi consists of six sections, each focusing on a critical aspect of military affairs: Planning for the State; Evaluating the Enemy; Controlling the Army; the Tao of the General; Responding to Change; and, Stimulating the Officers. Although each chapter is less concentrated than the traditional topic headings would suggest, they depict the subject matter and general scope of the book as a whole.

As a young man, Wu Qi spent a formative three years as a student of Confucianism. After gaining several years of administrative experience, he came to believe that, in order for benevolence and righteousness to survive in his time, military strength and preparation were necessary. Without a strong military to defend the just, he believed that Confucian virtues would disappear, and evil would dominate the world. Because of his emphasis on the importance of the military for safeguarding civil rights and liberty, the author of the Wuzi states that commanders must be selected carefully, ideally from those possessing courage and who excelled in military arts, but who also possessed good civil administration skills, and who displayed Confucian virtues, particularly those of wisdom and self-control.

Because armies in the Warring States were heavily dependent on the horse, both for transportation and for the power of the chariot, the Wuzi places a greater importance and focus on raising and maintaining a force of cavalry more than on maintaining infantry in its discussions of logistics. Because of the shift away from warfare fought among nobility, towards the mass mobilization of civilian armies, the Wuzi stresses the importance of gaining the strong support and loyalty of the common people. Because of its focus on the importance of civil administration as a necessary aid to military strength, the Wuzi stresses the implementation of Confucian policies designed to improve the material welfare of the people, gain their emotional support, and support their moral virtues.

Harmony and organization are equally important to each other: without harmony, an organization will not be cohesive; but, without organization, harmony will not be effective in achieving collective goals. There are three steps to achieving a disciplined, effective fighting force: proper organization; extensive training; and, thorough motivation. It is only after the creation of a disciplined, cohesive army that achieving victory becomes a matter of tactics and strategy. Much of the Wuzi discusses the means to achieve such a force.

Regarding the Legalist theories of achieving desired action through the proper exercise of reward and punishment, the Wuzi states that rewards and punishments are, by themselves, insufficient: excessive reward may cause individuals to pursue profit and glory at the expense of the group, while excessive punishment can lower morale, in the worst cases forcing men to flee service rather than face the consequences of failure. In addition to reward and punishment, the general should inculcate (essentially pseudo-Confucian) values into his soldiers: men fighting for what they believe is a moral cause will prefer death to living ignominiously, improving the chances of success for both the individual soldier and the army as a whole. It is only with the combination of both moral focus and effective rewards and punishments that the army will become a disciplined, spirited, strongly motivated force.

The Wuzi advises generals to adopt different tactics and strategy based on their assessment of battlefield situations. Factors affecting appropriate tactics and strategy include: the relative terrain and weather of the engagement; the national character of the combatants; the enemy commander's personal history and characteristics; and, the relative morale, discipline, fatigue, number, and general quality of both friendly and enemy forces. In gathering this information, and in preventing the enemy from gaining it, espionage and deception are paramount.

== Authorship ==
Because of the lack of archaeological evidence, there is no consensus among modern scholars concerning the date that The Wuzi was composed, and/or last modified. A work known as Wuzi was one of the most widely referenced books on military strategy among the records that existed in the Warring States period. (Notable contemporary records mentioning the Wuzi are the Spring and Autumn Annals and the Han Feizi.) Sima Qian, in his Shiji, equates the popularity of the Wuzi, in both the Warring States and the Han dynasty, with that of Sun Tzu's Art of War. There is evidence that, in the Warring States, two different texts titled "Wuzi" existed, but (at least) one of them has been lost. The fact that large portions of the text seem to have been either lost or deliberately excised from surviving editions makes the dating of the work more challenging. There is evidence both supporting the theory that much of the present text was authored in the mid-Warring States, and that it was modified after this date.

The most systematic study of the Wuzi's date of composition and authorship, based on historical references and the book's content, concludes that the core of the work was likely authored by Wu Qi himself, but was likely subject to serious losses of content, revisions, and accretions after his lifetime. This theory assumes that Wu Qi's disciples initially continued amending the text, but cannot account for some content that seems to have been inserted as late as the Han dynasty (possibly in an effort to "update" the work). The following five points summarize this study's conclusions regarding the Wuzi's date of composition.

=== Historical references ===
The writings of Wu Qi were known to be in wide circulation by the late Warring States period. The assertion of the book's early popularity is based on the comment, from the Han Feizi, that "Within the borders everyone speaks about warfare, and everywhere households secretly store away the books of Sun and Wu." The Shiji corroborates this information. The Wuzi continued to be studied both by famous Han dynasty figures, and by those in the Three Kingdoms period. The record of continuous attention supports the view that was continuously transmitted from the Warring States until at least the Three Kingdoms period.

=== Shared passages between contemporary works ===
The Wuzi shares both concepts and whole passages with other works dated more conclusively to the Warring States period. (The texts with which the Wuzi shares the greatest resemblance are the Wei Liaozi, Sun Bin's Art of War, and the Six Secret Teachings.) The close similarities that the Wuzi shares with other works from the Warring States period suggest that the Wuzi predates these other works, largely because Sun Bin's Art of War had been lost for two thousand years, so passages from Sun Bin's work could not have been lifted to forge the Wuzi (just prior to the Tang dynasty, as was claimed in later Chinese history.)

=== Perspective / occupation of writer ===
Wu Qi was both a civil and military leader, and excelled in both occupations. This dual role was common until the early Warring States period, but disappeared in later Chinese history. The fact that the Wuzi was written from the perspective of an official with both civil and martial responsibilities supports the theory that it dates from the early Warring States.

=== Archaeological support ===
Qing scholastic criticism discounted the possible authenticity of the text based on its mention of military practices then considered anachronous to the Warring States period. The list of items (then) considered anachronous includes: playing pipes in camp; the inclusion of terms not otherwise known to have been invented until after the Warring States; and, the appearance of certain astrological banners used by different units. Because recent archeological discoveries have confirmed that all of these "anachronous" practices existed by the Warring States, this Qing-era evidence for the Wuzi's forgery is not valid.

=== Remaining criticisms ===
Remaining criticisms which the defenders of the Wuzi's authenticity cannot account for center on the book's description of cavalry as a major, important branch of the military. Because the use of cavalry (presumably) did not become important until the (very) late-Warring States period, the text's emphasis on cavalry implies that present editions must have been edited after Wu Qi's death (unless cavalry became important in central China much earlier than presently believed). Unless evidence is found that cavalry became important in China before c. 300 BC (the date modern scholars generally assume Cavalry became important), then either parts of the Wuzi, or the entire text, must be attributed either to the late Warring States or the early Han dynasty.

Modern scholars conclude that the most satisfying conclusion, accounting for the above facts, is that the text was substantially created by "Wu Qi himself, but that in the course of transmission and revision, later Warring States strategists (and probably Han students)... added passages on cavalry and otherwise emended some of the terminology." By being a work which was the product of a famous historical figure, but amended by future generations of strategists, the Wuzi's composition is very similar to most of the other Seven Military Classics.

== See also ==
- The Art of War
- Wu Qi
- Seven Military Classics
- Warring States period
- Han dynasty
- Sun Bin's Art of War
