= Wu Qi =

Chinese general (440–381 BC)

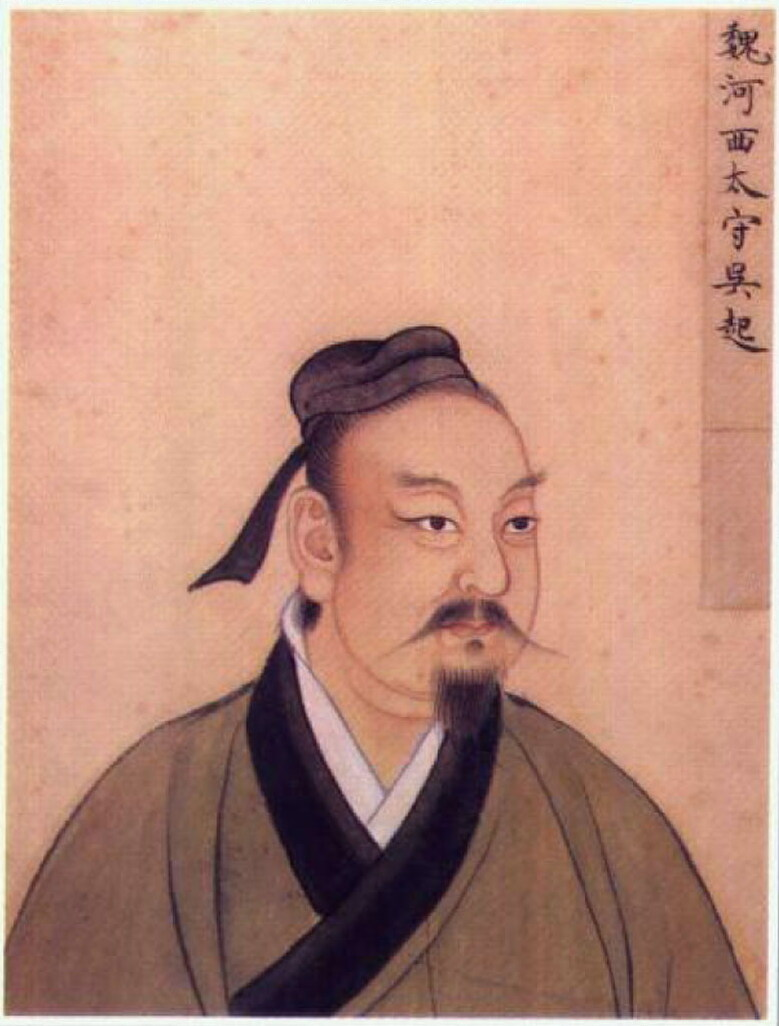
Portrait of Wu Qi, dated to the Ming Dynasty.

Wu Qi (simplified Chinese: 吴起; traditional Chinese: 吳起; pinyin: Wú Qǐ; Wade–Giles: Wu Ch'i, 440–381 BC) was a Warring States period Chinese military general and Prime Minister of the Chu state.

== Biography ==
Wu Qi was born in the state of Wey (卫). He first sought military office in the state of Lu. To soothe any doubts the Duke of Wei at the time had, he would kill his wife, who was from Wei. Later, some officials would slander him with false statements about him; in response, he had them killed or flee to Wey (衛) (not to be confused with Wei), where he would offer services to the Marquis. He was appointed as Protector of the West River.

Wu Qi would then leave the position. He would be appointed by King Dao of Chu in 384 BC as Prime Minister of the State of Chu. He would lead to the reorganization and modernization of the state administration, which would earn him many enemies. Wu Qi was executed in 381 BC.

== Wei Liaozi ==
According to the Wei Liaozi, a treatise on military matters dating from the late 4th or early 3rd century BC, the general Wu Qi was once offered a sword by his subordinates on the eve of battle. However Wu Qi refused to accept the weapon on the basis that banners and drums, the tools to lead and command, were the only instruments a general required. In his words, "to command the troops and direct their blades, this is the role of a commander. To wield a single sword is not his role."

The point here is to highlight the idea that the general was the brain of the army, whereas the soldiers were to behave as the limbs. Heroic individual actions were disincentivized in preference to complete obedience and perfect coordination as a unit, a concept which the Wei Liaozi elucidates upon in another parable concerning Wu Qi: Prior to the beginning of a battle, one of Wu's soldiers broke from his ranks in his enthusiasm and charged the enemy line, slaying two men, and trotted back to his former position along with their heads as trophies. Wu immediately ordered the man to be put to death. When his officers protested that he was a fine warrior, Wu Qi answered, "He is indeed a fine warrior, but he disobeyed my orders." As with Sun Tzu and his Art of War, Wu Qi emphasized discipline and obedience before bravery as the most important traits in soldiery.

== Popular culture ==
He and Sun Zi are often mentioned in the same sentence (Sun-Wu, 孙吴) as great military strategists of similar if not equal importance.

His military treatise, the Wuzi, is included as one of the Seven Military Classics. It is said there were two books on the art of war by Wu Qi, but one was lost, hence leaving the Wuzi as the only existing book carrying Wu Qi's military thoughts.

Wu Qi is one of the 32 historical figures who appear as special characters in the video game series Romance of the Three Kingdoms (video game) by Koei.

== See also ==
- Wuqi County
