= Questions and Replies between Tang Taizong and Li Weigong =

Fictional dialogue between Emperor Taizong and Li Jing

- Traditional Chinese: 唐太宗李衛公問對
- Simplified Chinese: 唐太宗李卫公问对
- Literal meaning: Taizong of Tang [and] Li, Duke of Wey; questions [and] replies
Transcriptions
Standard Mandarin
- Hanyu Pinyin: Táng Tàizōng Lǐ Wèigōng wèn duì

Pages from a printed copy of the text collected by the Shanghai Library

Taizong of Tang, 7th-century emperor

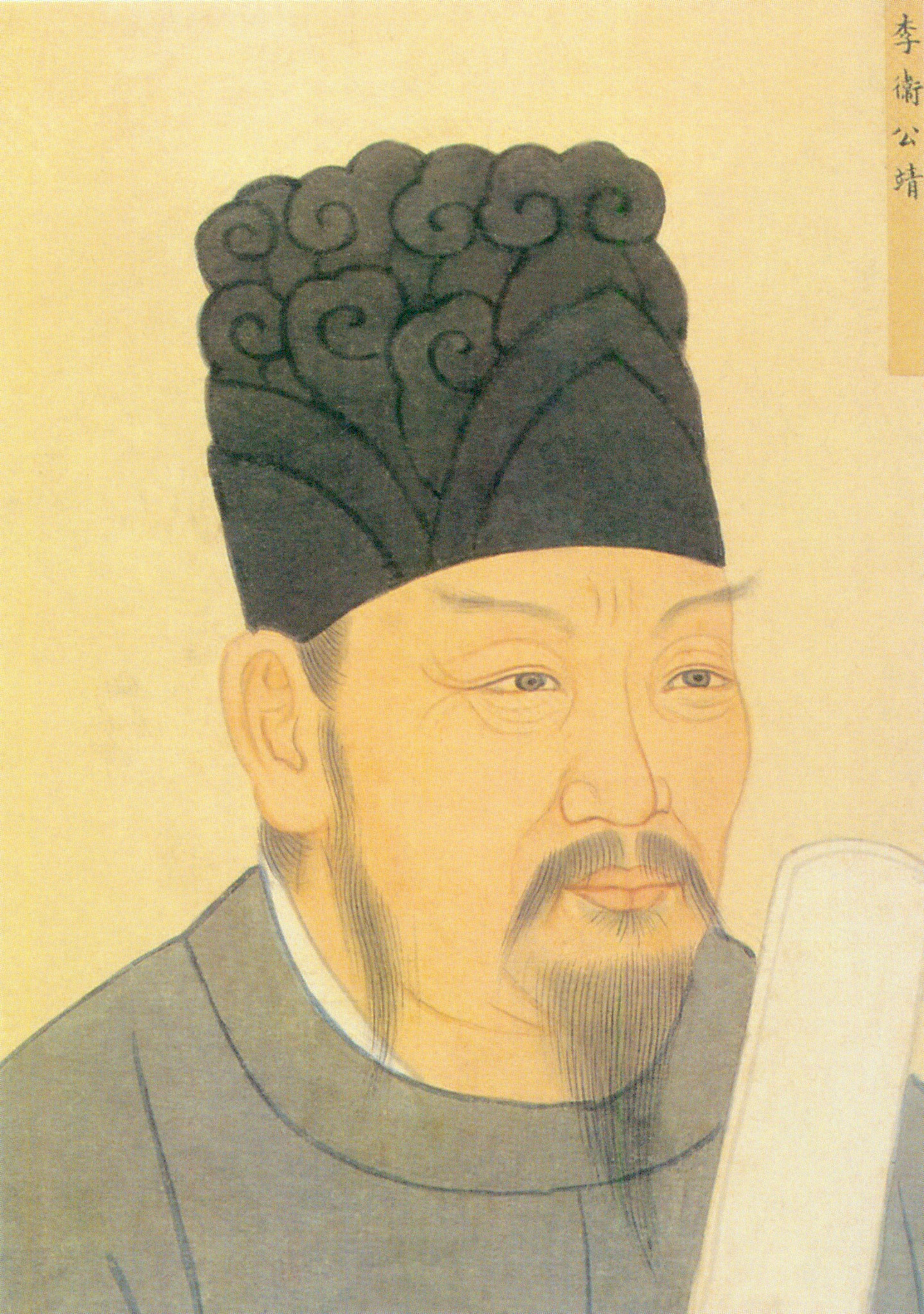
Li Jing, 7th-century general; known posthumously as Duke (gōng) of Wei

Questions and Replies between Emperor Taizong of Tang and Li Weigong (Chinese: 唐太宗李衛公問對) is a fictional dialogue between Emperor Taizong (AD 599–649) of the Tang dynasty and Li Jing (571–649 AD), a prominent Tang general. It discusses matters of military strategy, and is considered to be one of the Seven Military Classics of China.

== Content ==
The content of Questions and Replies differs strongly from the other six Military Classics. The armies that existed by the time of the Tang dynasty consisted of infantry, crossbowmen, and cavalry. Chariots had long since ceased to have any military application, and weapons were exclusively made from iron and steel. Large numbers of local, cohesive units provided a great degree of flexibility to large-scale deployments. Professional units were supplemented by disciplined and well-armed conscript forces. Weapons and unit sub-types were highly specialized. The recognition of the military value of speed and mobility was widespread, with flanking and other indirect maneuvers preferred over direct, frontal engagements.

The social and technological realities from which Questions and Replies was written were very different from the other six Military Classics. Rather than claiming to originate its own strategy, Questions and Replies frames itself as a survey of earlier, more widely recognized works, discussing their theories and contradictions according to the writer's own military experience. Because Li Jing was a historically successful general, the tactics and strategies discussed in Questions and Replies must be considered the theoretical product of actions tested and employed in battles critical to the establishment of the Tang dynasty, if it is indeed wholly or even partly the product of Li Jing's thoughts.

== History and authenticity ==
The historical evidence for Questions and Replies' authorship is unclear, but the available evidence largely refutes the tradition attributing it directly to Li Jing. Based on its earliest surviving bibliographical references, most modern historians consider Questions and Replies to be the product of either the late Tang (618–907 AD) or early Song (960–1279 AD) dynasties. Unlike other military classics, the history of Questions and Replies has not benefitted from any significant archaeological discoveries, so the date of its composition can only be inferred by surviving historical records concerning the treatise. There is no consensus among scholars regarding the precise date of its composition.

=== Evidence of Forgery ===
Most available data points to a composition date in the Northern Song dynasty (960–1127). Bibliographies from the Tang and Song dynasties contain references to seven other works attributed to Li Jing, but no reference to Questions and Replies. A major work (the "Dong Tian"), completed in the eighth century AD, quotes Li Jing extensively, but never once mentions "Questions and Replies". Because of the lack of earlier reference to Questions and Replies, and because of references from some Northern Songs' scholars claiming to have seen drafts of Questions and Replies by a contemporary military scholar named "Yuan Yi", many scholars believed that Questions and Replies was forged by Yuan Yi in the early Song dynasty. If Questions and Replies was created by Yuan Yi, it is not clear if the military theories found in Questions and Replies are actually the opinions of Li Jing, taken from other sources and compiled by Yuan Yi to form the present text, or if they are Yuan Yi's original thoughts, using the veneer of Li Jing's speech in order to promote the acceptance of his theories.

=== Evidence of Authenticity ===
There is some evidence discrediting the theory that Yuan Yi forged the text. Previous to the compilation of the Seven Military Classics, the Song Emperor Shenzong (r. 1068–1085) ordered the study and exegesis of a "Li Jing Bing Fa" ("Li Jing's Military Methods"). Assuming that this Li Jing Bing Fa was an edition of Questions and Replies, the existence of the book precedes the supposed date of Yuan Yi's forgery by ten years. Skepticism that every living general and military scholar could have been deceived by a very recent forgery also fails to support the theory that Questions and Replies was forged by Yuan Yi.

=== Conclusion ===
Regardless of its author and date of authorship, modern military historians recognize the theoretical advances it represents over the other six Military Classics, and recognize that it must be the creation of an advanced and experienced military strategist. The available evidence seems to indicate that it most likely achieved its present form around the time of the Song Emperor Shenzong's reign, possibly at his mandate. If it is a forgery, scholars have been unable to identify the source or sources that the present edition of Questions and Replies was drawn from.

== See also ==
- Emperor Taizong of Tang
- Li Jing
- Tang dynasty
- Song dynasty
- Emperor Shenzong
- The Seven Military Classics
