= Seven Military Classics =

Canon of military treatises from ancient China

The Seven Military Classics (traditional Chinese: 武經七書; simplified Chinese: 武经七书; pinyin: Wǔjīngqīshū; Wade–Giles: Wu ching ch'i shu) were seven important military texts of ancient China, which also included Sun-tzu's The Art of War. The texts were canonized under this name during the 11th century AD, and from the time of the Song dynasty, were included in most military leishu. Emperor Shenzong, the sixth emperor of the Song dynasty, determined which texts would be included in this anthology in 1080. For imperial officers, either some or all of the works were required reading to merit promotion, like the requirement for all bureaucrats to learn and know the work of Confucius. The Art of War was translated into Tangut with commentary.

== List ==
According to Ralph D. Sawyer and Mei-chün Sawyer, who created one of the latest translations, the Seven Military Classics include the following texts:

- Jiang Ziya (Taigong)'s Six Secret Teachings
- The Methods of the Sima (also known as Sima Rangju Art of War)
- Sun Tzu's The Art of War
- Wu Qi's Wuzi
- Wei Liaozi
- Three Strategies of Huang Shigong
- Questions and Replies between Tang Taizong and Li Weigong

There are no other known variations of the Seven Military Classics anthology with alternating members but the constituent works themselves have had many multiple versions, especially The Art of War, which has had at least several dozen different translations to English in the 20th century alone.

Despite prominence of military texts in the Yi Zhou shu, none of the anthology chapters were regarded as classics.

== Influence ==
There were many anthologies with different notations and analyses by scholars throughout the centuries leading up to the present versions in Western publishing. The Kangxi Emperor of the Qing dynasty commented on the seven military classics, stating, "I have read all of the seven books, among them there are some materials that are not necessarily right and there are superstitious stuff can be used by bad people."

Members of the Chinese Communist Party also studied the texts during the Chinese Civil War as well as many European and American military minds.

The Art of War was studied by warring Japanese clans during internal civil wars such as the Genpei War, the Sengoku Jidai, and the Boshin War in Japan.

Chinese military works like Su Shu, San Liu, Six Secret Teachings and Art of War were translated into Manchu. Manchus used Manchu translations of the Chinese novel Romance of the Three Kingdoms to learn military strategy.
