= Sun Tzu =

Chinese general (544–496 BC)

- 孫子
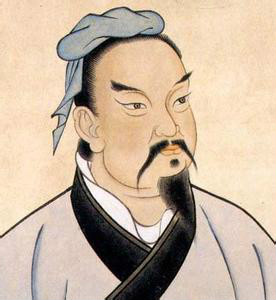
- Qing-era representation of Sun Tzu
- Born: Sun Wu; 544 BC (traditional); Qi
- Died: 496 BC (traditional; aged 47–48); Gusu, Wu State
- Occupations: Military general, strategist, philosopher, writer
- Writing career
- Pen name: Sun Tzu
- Language: Chinese
- Period: Spring and Autumn
- Subject: Military strategy
- Notable work: The Art of War

Chinese name
- Traditional Chinese: 孫子
- Simplified Chinese: 孙子
- Wade–Giles: Sun^{1} Tzu^{3}
- Hanyu Pinyin: Sūnzǐ
- Literal meaning: "Master Sun"
Transcriptions
Standard Mandarin
- Hanyu Pinyin: Sūnzǐ
- Bopomofo: ㄙㄨㄣ ㄗˇ
- Gwoyeu Romatzyh: Suentzyy
- Wade–Giles: Sun^{1} Tzu^{3}
- Tongyong Pinyin: Sun-zǐh
- Yale Romanization: Swūndž
- MPS2: Suēntž
- IPA: [swə́n.tsɹ̩̀]
Wu
- Suzhounese: Sen^{1}-tsy^{3}
Yue: Cantonese
- Yale Romanization: Syūnjí
- Jyutping: syun1 zi2
- IPA: [syn˥ tsi˧˥]
Southern Min
- Hokkien POJ: Sun-chú
- Tâi-lô: Sun-tsú
Middle Chinese
- Middle Chinese: suən t͡sɨ^{X}
Old Chinese
- Baxter–Sagart (2014): *[s]ˤu[n] tsəʔ

Sun Wu
- Traditional Chinese: 孫武
- Simplified Chinese: 孙武
- Wade–Giles: Sun^{1} Wu^{3}
- Hanyu Pinyin: Sūn Wǔ
Transcriptions
Standard Mandarin
- Hanyu Pinyin: Sūn Wǔ
- Bopomofo: ㄙㄨㄣ ㄨˇ
- Gwoyeu Romatzyh: Suen Wuu
- Wade–Giles: Sun^{1} Wu^{3}
- Tongyong Pinyin: Sun Wǔ
- Yale Romanization: Swūn Wǔ
- MPS2: Suēn Wǔ
- IPA: [swə́n ù]
Middle Chinese
- Middle Chinese: suən mɨo^{X}
Old Chinese
- Baxter–Sagart (2014): *[s]ˤu[n] m(r)aʔ

Changqing
- Traditional Chinese: 長卿
- Simplified Chinese: 长卿
- Wade–Giles: Ch'ang^{2}-chʻing^{1}
- Hanyu Pinyin: Chángqīng
Transcriptions
Standard Mandarin
- Hanyu Pinyin: Chángqīng
- Bopomofo: ㄔㄤˊ ㄑㄧㄥ
- Gwoyeu Romatzyh: Charngching
- Wade–Giles: Ch'ang^{2}-chʻing^{1}
- Tongyong Pinyin: Cháng-cing
- Yale Romanization: Chángchīng
- MPS2: Chángchīng
- IPA: [ʈʂʰǎŋ.tɕʰíŋ]
Middle Chinese
- Middle Chinese: ɖɨɐŋ kʰˠiæŋ
Old Chinese
- Baxter–Sagart (2014): *Cə-[N]-traŋ C.qʰraŋ

Vietnamese name
- Vietnamese: Tôn Vũ; Tôn Tử
- Hán-Nôm: 孫武; 孫子

Korean name
- Hangul: 손무; 손자
- Hanja: 孫武; 孫子
Transcriptions
- Revised Romanization: Sonmu; Sonja

Japanese name
- Kanji: 孫武; 孫子
- Hiragana: そんぶ; そんし
- Katakana: ソンブ; ソンシ
Transcriptions
- Revised Hepburn: Sonbu; Sonshi
- Kunrei-shiki: Sonbu; Sonsi

Sun Tzu (/ˌsʊnˈsuː/; traditional Chinese: 孫子; simplified Chinese: 孙子; pinyin: Sūnzǐ) was a Chinese military general, strategist, philosopher, and writer who lived during the Eastern Zhou period (771–256 BC). Sun Tzu is traditionally credited as the author of The Art of War, a Classical Chinese text on military strategy from the Warring States period, though the earliest parts of the work probably date to at least a century after him.

The Han dynasty historian Sima Qian and other traditional Chinese historians placed him as a minister to King Helü of Wu and dated his lifetime to 544–496 BC. The name Sun Tzu—by which he is more popularly known—is an honorific which means "Master Sun". His birth name was said to be Sun Wu (traditional Chinese: 孫武; simplified Chinese: 孙武) and he is posthumously known by his courtesy name Changqing (Chinese: 長卿). Traditional accounts state that the general's descendant Sun Bin wrote a treatise on military tactics, also titled The Art of War. Since both Sun Wu and Sun Bin were referred to as "Sun Tzu" in classical Chinese texts, some historians thought them identical, prior to the rediscovery of Sun Bin's treatise in 1972.

== Life ==
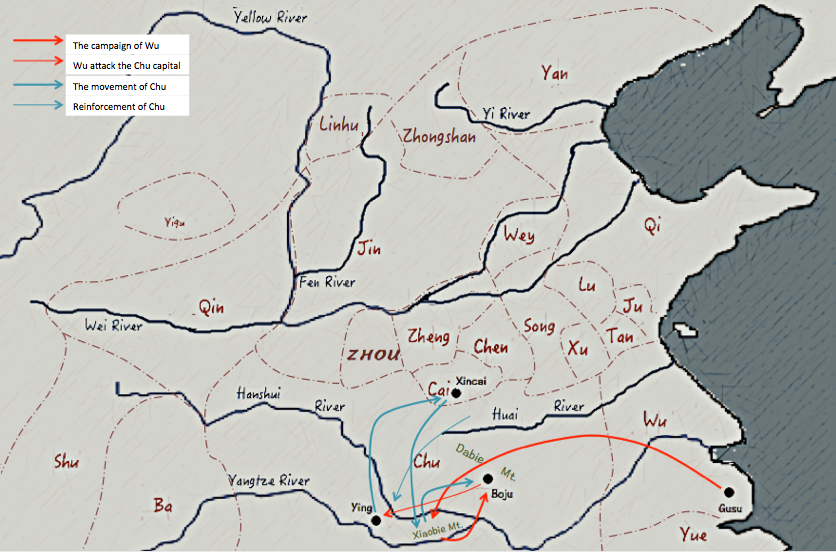
Situation during the Battle of Boju, which Sima Qian credits Sun Tzu with having participated in.

The earliest account of Sun Tzu's life is a short biography in Shiji (Records of the Grand Historian) written around 97 BC by Sima Qian. It states that Sun Tzu was born in Qi - now in modern Shandong - near the end of the Spring and Autumn period (776–471 BC), and had the courtesy name of "Wu." Mair considers the biography to be "essentially fictional". Sun Tzu is also mentioned in later Tang dynasty-period documents. Yuanhe Xingzuan (Compilation of Surnames from the Primal Accord Reign Period) written in 812 AD by Lin Bao says that Sun Tzu's descendants lived in Le'an from the Han dynasty but provides no evidence; there were no pre-Han places or governmental units called "Le'an" and Mair considers it "impossible to bridge the gap of well over a thousand years" between the Spring and Autumn period and the Tang period records. It is also unclear where Le'an is in modern China; the Le'an genealogy in the New Book of Tang has been associated with the Shandong counties of Boxing and Huimin; there is insufficient evidence to support either.

The Shiji biography consists of an account of how King Helü of Wu, having heard of Sun Wu's Art of War, summoned him to the palace and asked him to demonstrate his ability to train soldiers by training the king's harem of 180 concubines into soldiers. (Note: According to another version, there were three hundred.)

Sun Tzu was said to have divided them into two companies, appointing the two concubines most favored by the king as the company commanders, and proceeded to give them orders, which they ignored, instead breaking out into laughter. Over the king's protestations, Sun Tzu then had the two concubines executed, at which the rest of the "soldiers" began to behave at once, and the king appointed Sun Wu as a general. He went on to lead the state of Wu to victory against the much larger state of Chu during the Battle of Boju in 506 BC. Later accounts also associate Sun Tzu with Wu Zixu, who was credited with the authorship of the Wuzi, another ancient Chinese military text. Zixu was said to have been a refugee from Chu, and he introduced Sun Wu to King Helu.

Beginning in the 12th century (during the Song dynasty), several Chinese scholars began to doubt the historical existence of Sun Tzu. During the Song dynasty, Ye Shi (1150–1223) noticed that the Zuo Zhuan, which mentions most of the notable figures from the Spring and Autumn period, does not mention Sun Tzu at all despite the fact that Sima Qian had claimed in the Records of the Grand Historian that Sun Tzu had proved on the battlefield that his theories were effective at the Battle of Boju. The Zuo Zhuan, which was written centuries earlier than the Records of the Grand Historian and provides a much more detailed account of the Battle of Boju, does not mention Sun Tzu at all.

The name "Sun Wu" (孫武) does not appear in any text prior to the Records of the Grand Historian, and may have been an invented descriptive cognomen meaning "the fugitive warrior" – the surname "Sun" can be glossed as the related term "fugitive" (xùn 遜), while "Wu" is the ancient Chinese virtue of "martial, valiant" (wǔ 武), or a Jianghuai dialectal synonym of 士; shì "knight", which corresponds to Sunzi's role as the hero's doppelgänger in the story of Wu Zixu.

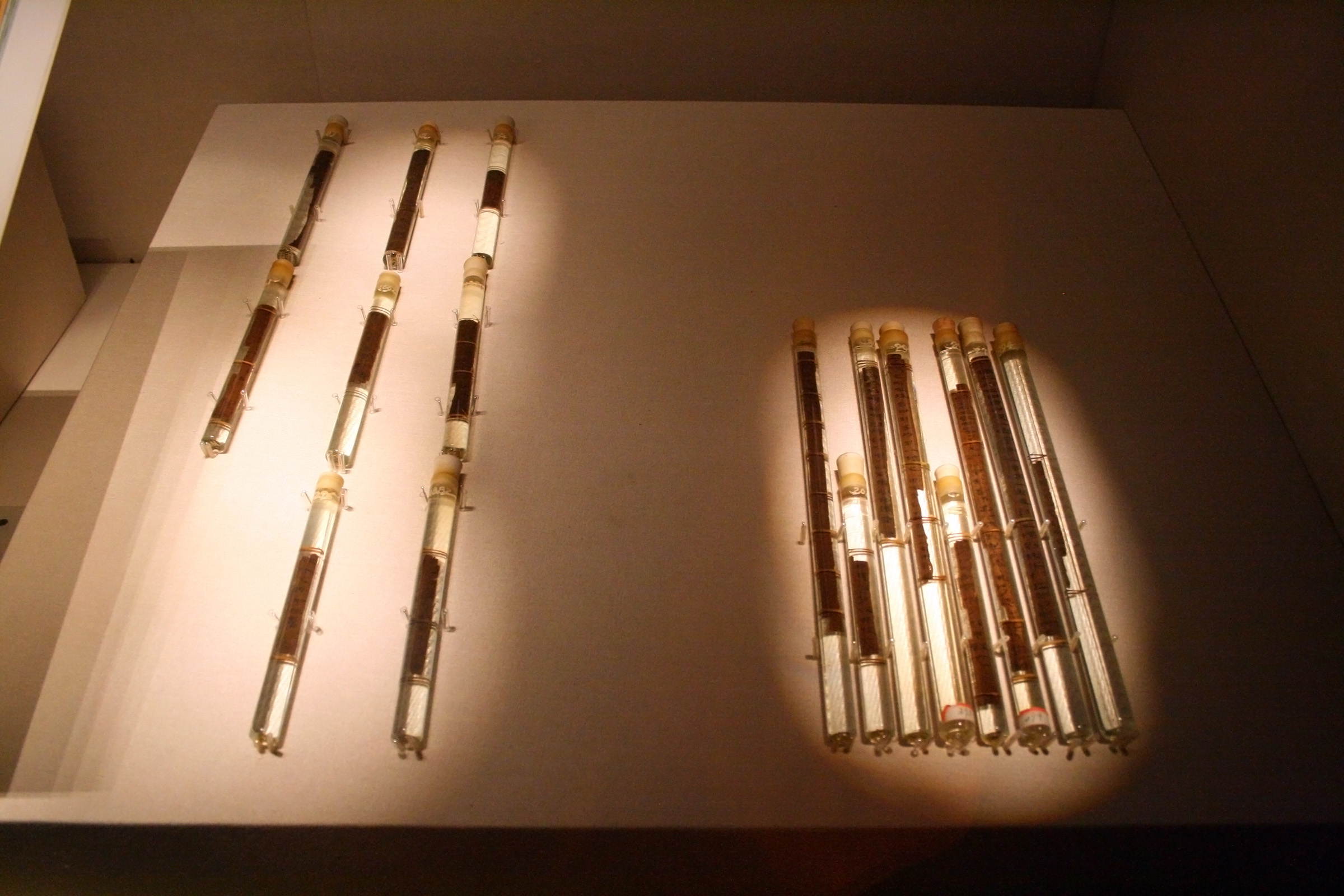
The Yinqueshan Han Slips unearthed in 1972 include Sun Tzu's Art of War, collection of Shandong Museum

Furthermore, the earliest parts of The Art of War, the work traditionally credited to Sun Tzu, probably dates to at least a century after him. Anachronisms in The Art of War include terms, technology (such as anachronistic crossbows), philosophical ideas, events, and military techniques that should not have been available to Sun Wu. Additionally, there are no records of professional generals during the Spring and Autumn period; these are only extant from the Warring States period, so there is doubt as to Sun Tzu's rank and generalship. This caused much confusion as to when The Art of War was actually written; since the 12th century, most scholars from the Song and Qing dynasty along with modern Chinese, Japanese and Western scholars follow Ye Shi in assigning the text to the beginning of the Warring States period. This later dating has been bolstered by the discovery of the text on bamboo slips accidentally unearthed by construction workers at Yinque Shan in Shandong in 1972, which had been sealed between 134 and 118 BC. The content of the earlier text is about one-third of the chapters of the modern The Art of War, and their texts match very closely.

Another text discovered in the same collection was Sun Bin's Military Methods, a previously lost work that had been attributed to one of Sun Wu's descendants by Han dynasty bibliographies. Due to its close relationship with the Art of War, Military Methods provides important context on the body of military thought in Chinese late antiquity. In the early 20th century, the Chinese writer and reformer Liang Qichao had theorized that the text of the Art of War was actually written in the 4th century BC by this purported descendant of Sun Tzu. Although this hypothesis is no longer tenable, the Sun Bin text's material overlaps with much of the "Sun Tzu" text, and the two may be "a single, continuously developing intellectual tradition united under the Sun name". Unlike Sun Wu, Sun Bin appears to have been an actual person who was a genuine authority on military matters and may have been the inspiration for the creation of the historical figure "Sun Tzu" through a form of euhemerism. This discovery also demonstrated that much of the historical confusion about anecdotes attributed to Sun Tzu could have been due to the fact that there were two authors that could have been referred to as "Master Sun."

== The Art of War ==
The environment that was fostered was marked by the Warring States period (475-221 BC). The Warring States period was marked by military conflicts and conquests, as well as political instability. This would then foster the development of philosophical and strategic texts like The Art of War.

The Art of War, traditionally ascribed to Sun Tzu, is a Classical Chinese text dating from the Warring States period. The work is composed of 13 chapters, each of which is devoted to a different set of skills or arts related to warfare and how they apply to military strategy and tactics. The book further outlines theories of battle, but it also advocates diplomacy and the cultivation of relationships with other nations as essential to the health of a state.

In addition, Taoist rhetoric is a component incorporated into the Art of War. According to Steven C. Combs in "Sun-zi and the Art of War: The Rhetoric of Parsimony", warfare is "used as a metaphor for rhetoric, and that both are philosophically based arts." Combs writes: "Warfare is analogous to persuasion, as a battle for hearts and minds." Combs compares Taoist and Aristotelian rhetoric, notably for the differences in persuasion. Taoist rhetoric in The Art of War is described as "peaceful and passive, favoring silence over speech". Frugal behavior, which is emphasized extensively in The Art of War as avoiding confrontation and being spiritual in nature, shapes basic principles in Taoism.

== Legacy ==
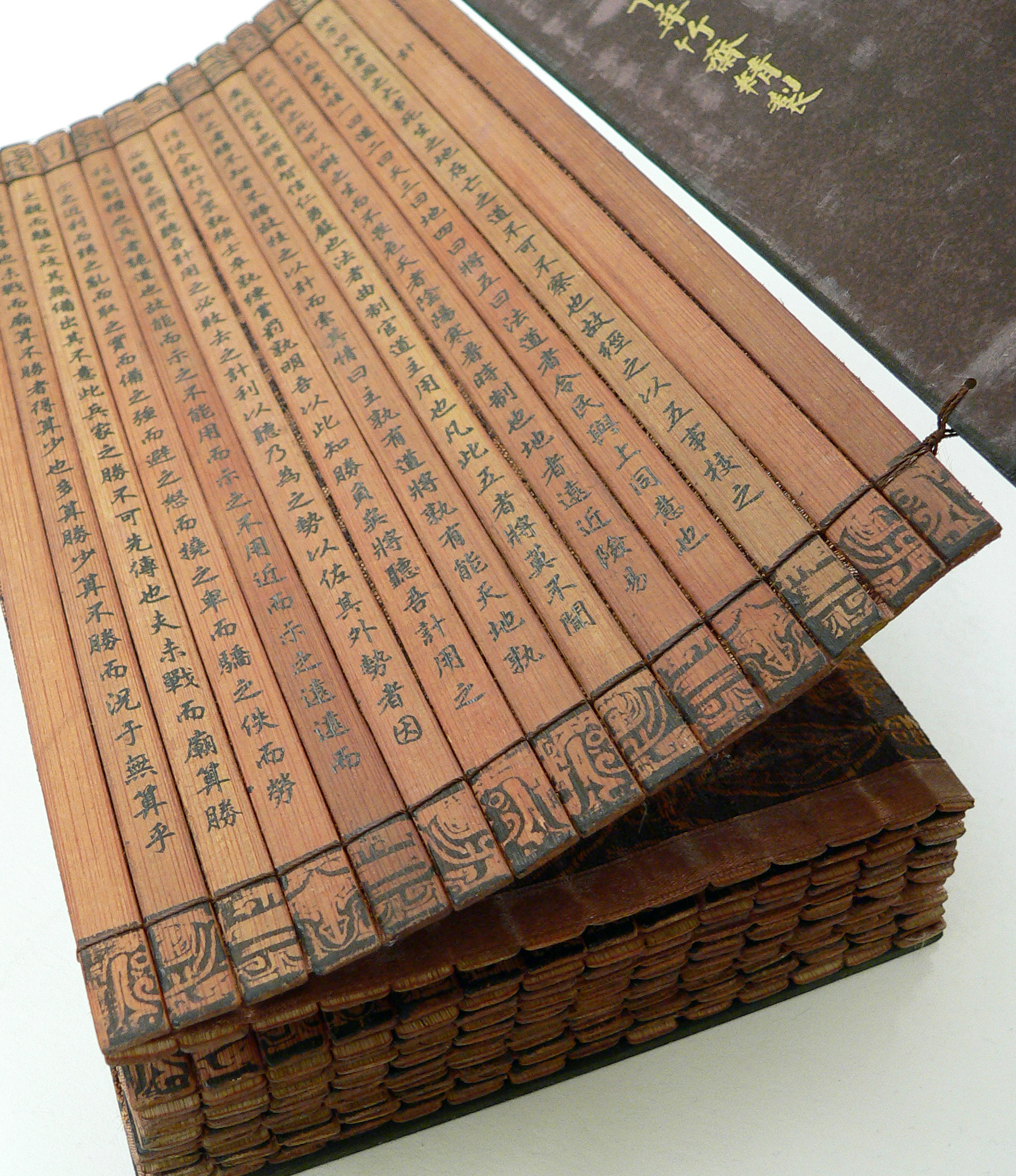
A copy of The Art of War written on bamboo

Sun Tzu's Art of War has influenced many notable figures and is accepted as a masterpiece on strategy. It has been frequently cited and referred to by generals and theorists since it was first published, translated, and distributed internationally.

The Art of War was one of the most widely read military treatises in the subsequent Warring States period, a time of constant war among seven ancient Chinese states—Zhao, Qi, Qin, Chu, Han, Wei, and Yan—who fought to control the vast expanse of fertile territory in Eastern China. For almost 1,500 years, it was the lead text in an anthology that was formalized as the Seven Military Classics by Emperor Shenzong of Song in 1080. The Art of War remains the most influential strategy text in East Asian warfare.

The Art of War appears throughout the bibliographical catalogs of the Chinese dynastic histories, but listings of its divisions and size varied widely. The strategist and warlord Cao Cao in the early 3rd century of the Common Era authored the earliest known commentary to the Art of War. Cao's preface makes clear that he edited the text and removed certain passages, but the extent of his changes was unclear historically. In the 12th century, Ji Tianbao compiled a collection of commentaries on The Art of War which included Cao Cao's commentary along with several later ones that are frequently cited, including Meng Shi (502–557), Li Quan (c. 750), Jia Lin (c. late 8th c.), Du You (735–812), Du Mu (803–852), Chen Hao (c. Tang dynasty), Mei Yaochen (1002 - 1060), Wang Xi (c. 1082), He Yanxi (c. late 11th c.), and Zhang Yu (c. Southern Song dynasty). Although most of these later commentaries have little value for philology or historical analysis of the original text, they attest the continued interest in the text throughout Chinese history.

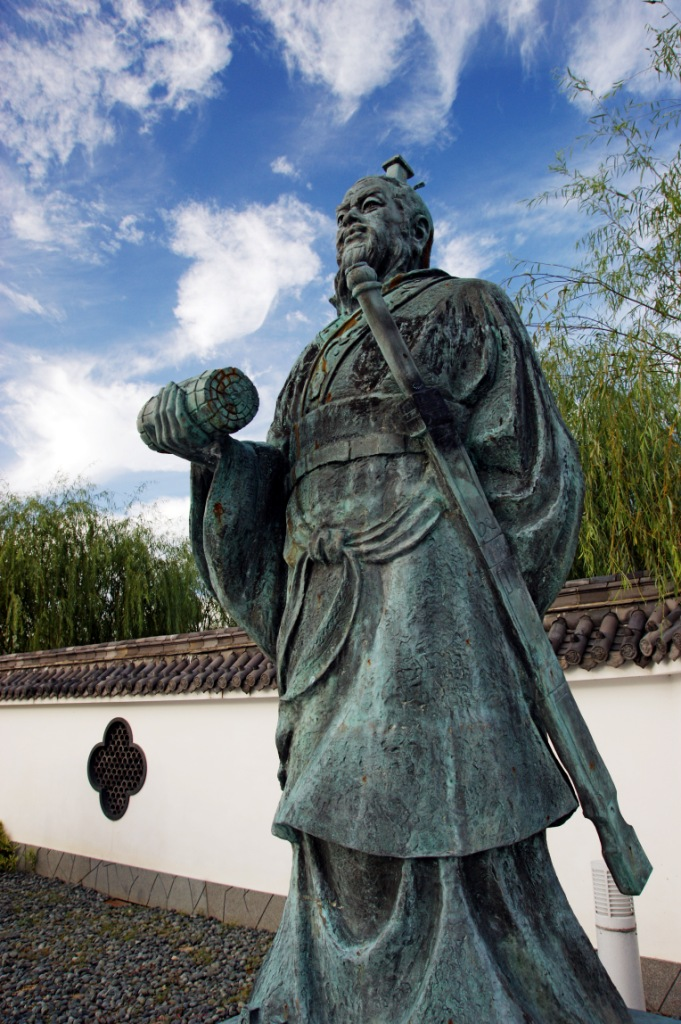
Statue of Sun Tzu in Yurihama, Tottori, in Japan

The Art of War was introduced into Nara Japan in the year 760 of the Common Era, and the book quickly became popular among Japanese generals. Through its later influence on the Sengoku period "Great Unifiers" of Japan, Oda Nobunaga, Toyotomi Hideyoshi, and Tokugawa Ieyasu, it significantly affected the unification of Japan in the early modern era. After the Meiji Restoration, the book remained popular among the Imperial Japanese armed forces. Admiral Tōgō Heihachirō, who led Japan's forces to victory in the Russo-Japanese War, was an avid reader of Sun Tzu.

The book was translated into French and published in 1772 by the French priest Jesuit Jean Joseph Marie Amiot; it was re-published in 1782. A partial translation into English was attempted by British officer Everard Ferguson Calthrop in 1905 under the title The Book of War. The first annotated English translation was completed and published by Lionel Giles in 1910.

In the twentieth century, military and political leaders such as the Chinese communist revolutionary Mao Zedong and Vietnamese general Võ Nguyên Giáp are cited along with American military generals Douglas MacArthur and Norman Schwarzkopf Jr. as having drawn inspiration from the book. Mao Zedong partially credited his 1949 victory over Chiang Kai-shek and the Kuomintang to The Art of War. The work strongly influenced writings about warfare in Mao's Little Red Book, which further influenced communist insurgencies around the world. Ho Chi Minh translated the work for his Vietnamese officers to study. His general Võ Nguyên Giáp was likewise an avid student and practitioner of Sun Tzu's ideas.

In Sun Tzu and the Art of Modern Warfare, Mark McNeilly writes that a modern interpretation of Sun and his importance throughout Chinese history is critical in understanding China's push to become a superpower in the twenty-first century. Modern Chinese scholars explicitly rely on historical strategy and The Art of War in developing their theories, seeing a direct relationship between their modern struggles and those of China in Sun Tzu's time. Sun Tzu's teachings and are used regularly in developing the strategies of the Chinese state and its leaders.

Some admirers of Sun Tzu's work claim that it has relevance in competitive endeavors across the modern world beyond military strategy and warfare, including espionage, culture, governance, business, and sports.

Sun Tzu has been mentioned often in popular American culture. For example, in the 1987 film Wall Street, the protagonist Gordon Gekko frequently cites passages from The Art of War as guiding principles for his aggressive trading techniques.

== See also ==
- Sun Bin
- Sun Jian
- Sima Rangju
- Confucius
- Qi–Lu culture
- Hundred Schools of Thought

== Notes ==
=== Sources ===
- Gawlikowski, Krzysztof; Loewe, Michael (1993). "Sun tzu ping fa 孫子兵法". In Loewe, Michael (ed.). Early Chinese Texts: A Bibliographical Guide. Berkeley: Society for the Study of Early China; Institute of East Asian Studies, University of California, Berkeley. pp. 446–455. ISBN 978-1-55729-043-4.
- Lewis, Mark Edward (1999). "Warring States Political History". In Loewe, Michael; Shaughnessy, Edward (eds.). The Cambridge History of Ancient China. Cambridge: Cambridge University Press. pp. 587–650. ISBN 978-0-521-47030-8.
- Mair, Victor H. (2007). The Art of War: Sun Zi's Military Methods. New York: Columbia University Press. ISBN 978-0-231-13382-1.
- Mair, Victor H. (February 2008). "Soldierly Methods: Vade Mecum for an Iconoclastic Translation of Sun Zi bingfa" (PDF). Sino-Platonic Papers (178).
- McNeilly, Mark R. (2001), Sun Tzu and the Art of Modern Warfare, Oxford University Press, ISBN 978-0-19-513340-0.
- Smith, Kidder (1999). "The Military Texts: The Sunzi". In de Bary, Wm. Theodore (ed.). Sources of Chinese Tradition: From Earliest Times to 1600, Volume 1 (2nd ed.). New York: Columbia University Press. pp. 213–224. ISBN 978-0-231-10938-3.
- Tung, R. L. (2001), "Strategic Management Thought in East Asia", in Warner, Malcolm (ed.), Comparative Management:Critical Perspectives on Business and Management, vol. 3, Routledge.
