= Six Secret Teachings =

Ancient Chinese treatise on military and political strategy

- Traditional Chinese: 六韜
- Simplified Chinese: 六韬
- Literal meaning: Six Secrets
Transcriptions
Standard Mandarin
- Hanyu Pinyin: Liù Tāo
- IPA: [ljôʊ.tʰáʊ]
Middle Chinese
- Middle Chinese: /lɨuk̚ tʰɑu/
Old Chinese
- Zhengzhang: /*k.ruk l̥ʰuː/

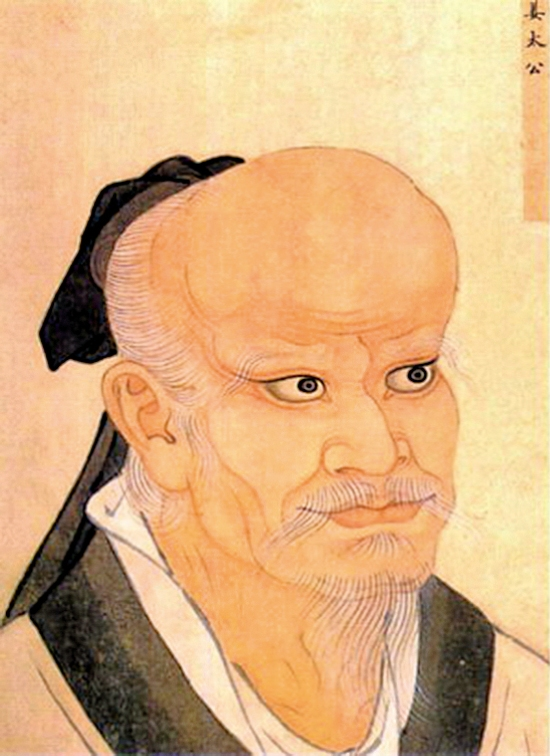
Portrait of Jiang Ziya in the Sancai Tuhui

The Six Secret Teachings (Chinese: 六韜), is a treatise on civil and military strategy traditionally attributed to Lü Shang (a.k.a. Jiang Ziya), a top general of King Wen of Zhou, founder of the Zhou dynasty, at around the eleventh century BC. Modern historians nominally date its final composition to the Warring States period (c. 475–221 BC), but some scholars believe that it preserves at least vestiges of ancient Qi political and military thought. Because it is written from the perspective of a statesman attempting to overthrow the ruling Shang dynasty, it is the only one of the Seven Military Classics explicitly written from a revolutionary perspective.

== Chapter Summary ==
Pages from a Qing dynasty printed edition of the Six Secret Teachings

1. The Civil Strategy: The Civil Strategy provides the narrative of how Jiang Ziya came to dictate the Six Secret Teachings to King Wen, and elaborates on how the state must be organized in order to provide a logistical base for any future military expansion. "Moral, effective government is the basis for survival and the foundation for warfare. The state must thrive economically while limiting expenditures, foster appropriate values and behaviour among the populace, implement rewards and punishments, employ the worthy, and refrain from disturbing and harming the people." This strategy teaches commanders never to delight in small advantages, or that is all they will achieve. It teaches that the greatest gains result from benevolence and helping others achieve their aspirations for a better world.
2. The Military Strategy: The Military Strategy continues the previous section's discussion of civil affairs, analyzes the current state of Zhou, and assesses the prospects of successfully overthrowing the Shang. "Attracting the disaffected weakens the enemy and strengthens the state; employing subterfuge and psychological techniques allows manipulation of the enemy and hastens its demise. The ruler must visibly cultivate his Virtue (德) and embrace government policies that will allow the state to compete for the minds and hearts of the people; the state will thus gain victory without engaging in battle." This strategy teaches commanders to achieve victory via benevolence and wit, preferably without actually fighting. It teaches commanders to outwit opponents through diplomacy and manipulation.
3. The Dragon Strategy: The Dragon Strategy primarily discusses military organization, the necessary characteristics of military officers, and how to evaluate and select for these qualities. It discusses how to establish a system of rewards and punishments for the purpose of establishing and maintaining a general's awesomeness and authority, and discusses the methods necessary to foster allegiance and unity in one's soldiers. The Dragon Strategy's secondary topics include: military communication and the need for secrecy; basic tactical principles (emphasizing flexibility and unorthodoxy); common errors of command and how to avoid them; various cues to interpret the enemy's situation; and, a discussion of common military skills and equipment. This strategy explores the subtle and complex aspects of critical situations without losing control to advisors or becoming confused. It emphasizes that the government depends on a centralized and orderly overview which must be well informed in order to function effectively.
4. The Tiger Strategy: The Tiger Strategy discusses military equipment, tactical principles, and essential issues of command. Most of the section provides "tactics for extricating oneself from adverse battlefield situations. The solutions generally emphasize speed, maneuverability, unified action, decisive commitment, the employment of misdirection, the establishment of ambushes, and the appropriate use of different types of forces." It emphasizes that a commander must guard against laxity and act in accord with ever-changing conditions. A commander must observe and utilize the effects and interactions of variables such as weather, terrain, and human psychology in order to achieve success.
5. The Leopard Strategy: "The Leopard Secret Teaching emphasizes tactical solutions for particularly difficult types of terrain, such as forests, mountains, ravines and defiles, lakes and rivers, deep valleys, and other constricted locations. It also contains discussions of methods to contain rampaging invaders, confront superior forces, deploy effectively, and act explosively." This section teaches commanders how to know their strengths, and how to direct those strengths against the weaknesses of their enemy.
6. The Dog Strategy: The Dog Strategy discusses a number of diverse topics, miscellaneous to the other sections. The most important sections "expound on detailed principles for appropriately employing the three component forces – chariots, infantry, and cavalry – in a wide variety of concrete tactical situations," and discusses the comparative battlefield effectiveness of these three forces. It discusses a variety of "deficiencies and weaknesses in the enemy that can and should be exploited immediately with a determined attack." It discusses several other, general issues: "the identification and selection of highly motivated, physically talented individuals for elite infantry units and for the cavalry and chariots; and methods for training the soldiers." This strategy teaches never to attack an enemy when his morale is high, and to time a concentrated attack when the moment is right.

== See also ==
- Pre-modern special forces
