= Sima Rangju =

Chinese general during the Spring and Autumn period

Sima Rangju (Chinese: 司馬穰苴) or Tian Rangju (Chinese: 田穰苴) (dates of birth and death unknown) was a famous Chinese military general during the Spring and Autumn period, often seen as the spiritual successor of Jiang Ziya. He served in the State of Qi, defending it from the states of Jin and Yan, and went as high in the army as Da Sima, the Minister of War. As a result, he is also sometimes called Sima Rangju . He was later dismissed by Duke Jing of Qi, who apparently listened to hypocrites, falsely accusing Rangju. He was depressed and fell ill, resulting in his death. Little is known about his life due to the lack of historical records, but his thoughts and ideas passed on. His works were later composed into a book called The Methods of the Sima. He was highly praised by Sima Qian, a famous Chinese historian.

== Life ==
Yan Ying, the Prime Minister of Duke Jing of Qi, recommended Rangju to the duke and he became a general. He was ordered to restore territory lost to the states of Jin and Yan. In order to build his prestige within the army, he suggested to the Duke to send someone to oversee his actions. The Duke sent Zhuang Gu (庄贾) as the overseer. Zhuang Gu was always arrogant, and he was late attending a parade. Rangju followed the regulations and ordered that Zhuang Gu be executed. When a messenger sent by Zhuang Gu retrieved a document that gave Zhuang Gu the command of the army, Rangju said: "When the general is commanding an army, he can disobey orders from the King." He then asked a law officer: "What punishment does he deserve for galloping in the army camp? " The answer was "execution". Rangju then executed the messenger for galloping freely inside the army camp, also killing his horse and destroying his cart.

Rangju enforced the laws with fairness and his prestige increased rapidly within the army. He defeated the armies of Jin and Yan, restoring lost land. He was promoted to Da Sima, the Minister of War. The Tian Clan which he belonged to also became more powerful. Other Qi clans including Bao (鲍), Gao (高) and Guo (国) saw him as a threat and made false allegations against Rangju in front of the Duke. In the end, the Duke dismissed Rangju. Rangju died soon afterward. The next leader of the Tian clan Tian Qi (田乞) therefore despised those three families. The son of Tian Qi, called Tian Chang (田常), later destroyed the three families.

Tian Chang's great grandson King Wei of Qi organised the works of Rangju and it was known as The Precepts of War, also known as The Methods of the Sima.

== See also ==
- The Methods of the Sima
- Seven Military Classics
- The Art of War
