= Sun Bin's Art of War =

Ancient Chinese classic work on military strategy

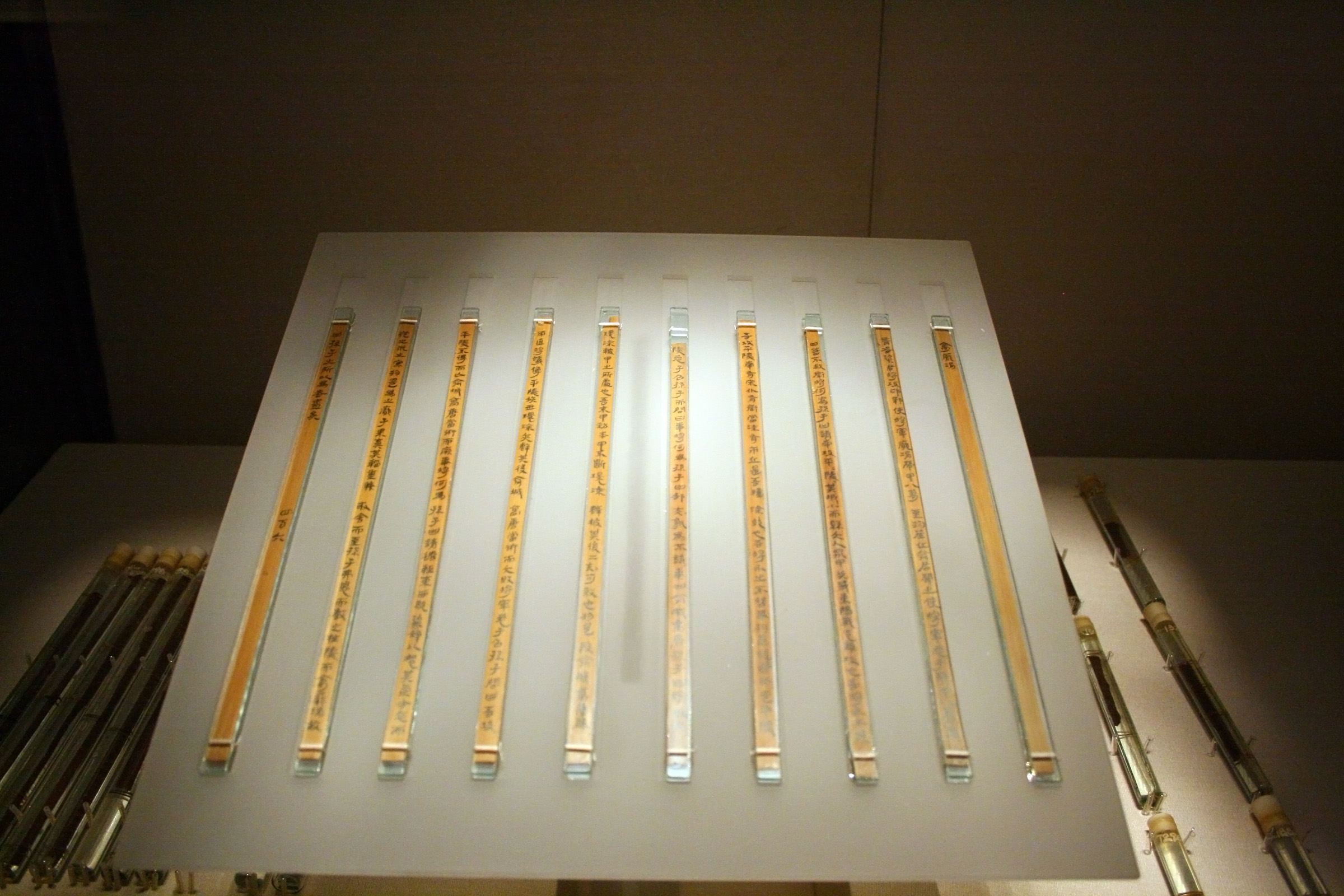
- Inscribed bamboo-slips of Sun Bin's Art of War, unearthed in Yinque Mountain, Linyi, Shandong in 1972
- Traditional Chinese: 孫臏兵法
- Simplified Chinese: 孙膑兵法
Transcriptions
Standard Mandarin
- Hanyu Pinyin: Sūn Bìn Bīngfǎ
Southern Min
- Hokkien POJ: Sun-pīn-peng-hoat

Sun Bin's Art of War is a Chinese treatise on military strategy that dates back to the Warring States period, an era of political instability and warfare in ancient China. It is credited to Sun Bin, who was believed to be a descendant of the famous military strategist Sun Tzu. Sun Bin served as a military advisor in the Qi state during this period and is said to have authored this piece on military tactics.

Historical records from the Han dynasty suggest that the original text of Sun Bin's Art of War comprised 89 chapters, accompanied by four volumes of illustrations. Unfortunately, the original work was lost by the end of the Eastern Han dynasty.

While Sun Bin's Art of War and Sun Tzu's The Art of War share a similar name, they are distinct works by different authors.

== Rediscovery ==
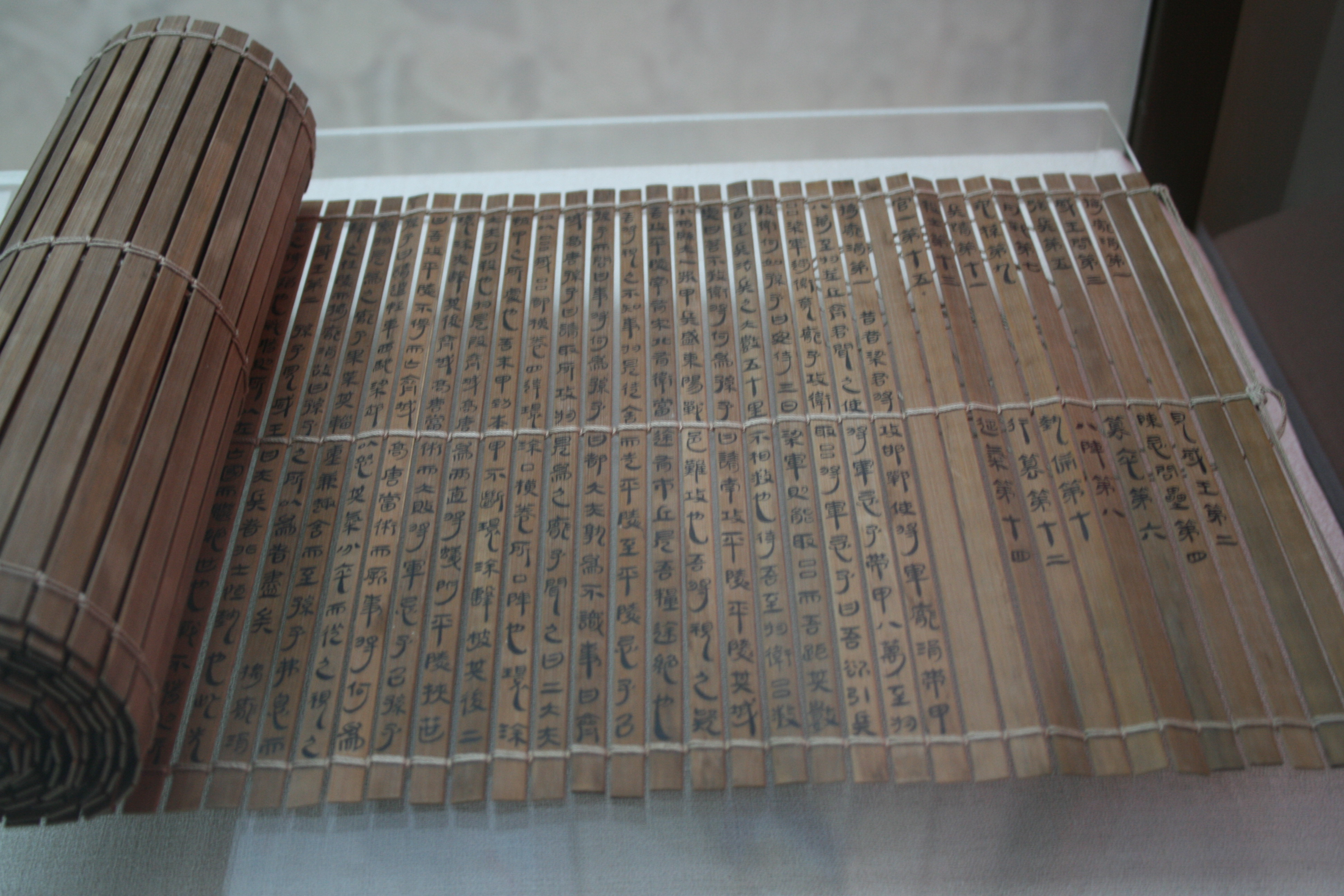
A Han dynasty (202 BC - 220 AD) copy of Sun Bing's Art of War (in a scroll of wooden strips), from a tomb of Shandong province, now in the Military Museum

In April 1972, bamboo parchments of both Sun Tzu's and Sun Bin's works were unearthed in the Yinque Hills (Linyi city, Shandong province). Due to natural deterioration, some of the parchments were damaged and difficult to read. After initial collection and studies by experts, the Cultural Relic Press published a new edition of Sun Bin's Art of War, which was divided into two volumes, each containing 15 chapters, with a total of 11,000 words.

After a decade of textual research and study, the Cultural Relic Press made a major adjustment to the book: the second volume was no longer considered to be Sun Bin's writings; the first volume was edited, and one chapter detailing five types of training was added. The current edition of Sun Bin's Art of War contains 16 chapters, with a total of 4891 words.

== Contents ==
=== Chapter 1: Capturing Pang Juan ===
Describes the four stratagems employed in the Battle of Guiling:

1. A southward march at the initial stage of the war, to avoid a decisive battle with Pang Juan.
2. Launching a false attack and feigning retreat and defeat in Pingling, which reinforced Pang Juan's determination to attack Handan.
3. Direct advance on Kaifeng (capital city of the Wei state) to force Pang Juan to turn back to rescue Wei.
4. Ambush at Guiling to destroy the enemy in one move.

=== Chapter 2: Meeting King Wei ===
Sun Bin discusses warfare with King Wei of Qi and states: "Only victory in war can bring about authority and prosperity". Sun believes that the historically progressive unification accomplished in the war had been an important means of facilitating the submission of feudal lords. To start a war, one must have "a storage of materials, a just cause for war" and "be well-prepared before launching an attack". Sun also pointed out that "[w]armongers will inevitably lose, and those who expect to make a fortune out of war will also suffer defeat and disgrace".

=== Chapter 3: King Wei asks for advice ===
Sun Bin advises King Wei and Tian Ji, engaging them in a comprehensive discussion on his thoughts about strategy and tactics. The chapter focuses on resolute attacks on weakly defended key enemy positions and on the military philosophy of using Tao and flexible principles to attain victory.

=== Chapter 4: Tian Ji asks how to construct a defense ===
Set in the Battle of Maling, Sun Bin and Tian Ji discuss the problems of battlefield positions in field operations. The combination of terrain, weapons and the types of soldiers is emphasized.

=== Chapter 5: Selection of the best soldiers ===
Comments on the basic principles of building and training an army, and on the factors of field command that will determine victory or defeat. On the topic of building an army, Sun Bin focuses on the employment of the best soldiers in terms of field command. He stresses 'five factors that will lead to constant victory':

1. The commander who has won the sovereign's trust and has independent command will win.
2. The one who knows the art of war will win.
3. The one who gets uniform support from his soldiers will win.
4. The one whose subordinates work in concert with each other will win.
5. The one who is good at analyzing and utilizing terrain will win.

There are also five corollaries that will lead to constant defeat:

1. The one whose command is constrained by the sovereign will be defeated.
2. The one who does not know the art of war will be defeated.
3. The one who does not have the support of his soldiers will be defeated.
4. The one whose subordinates do not work in harmony will be defeated.
5. The one who does not know how to use spies will be defeated.

=== Chapter 7: Eight formations ===
Discusses the methods of a commander and the principles of battle formation.

It emphasizes that a commander must "be well versed in both meteorology and geography. He also must get the support of his people at home, while understanding the actual situation of his enemy. In a direct battle, he knows well the basic points of the eight formations. If one is sure of victory, he will fight; if unsure, he should not fight." Sun Bin also emphasizes "that in laying a formation, the army can be divided into three divisions. In each, the best soldiers should be placed as a vanguard, and every team should be followed with a sustainable reserve."

He emphasizes "dividing the army into three teams" and "engaging one team in battle in while leaving the other two strictly in defense."

Sun Bin says that an army must take an advantageous geographical position to attack an enemy in a less defensible position. "When land is flat, there should be more armed chariots; when the terrain is difficult, more cavalry should be sent: and when narrow and blocked, there should be more archers sent."

=== Chapter 14: Organization of military posts ===
Chapter 14 is similar to the military rules and regulations of the later ages. It may be divided into three parts:

1. Regulations for army organization and command, emphasizing that all types of organizations, units, and systems must completely and appropriately meet the requirements for battle.
2. Regulations for military operations under different enemy situations, different terrain, and different climates. Its focus is to emphasize flexibility in command and in the employment of soldiers, and on the need to make decisions according to the situation.
3. Specific rules on marching, camping, patrolling, guarding, war preparations, and logistics.
