= Wei Liaozi =

One of the Seven Military Classics of ancient China

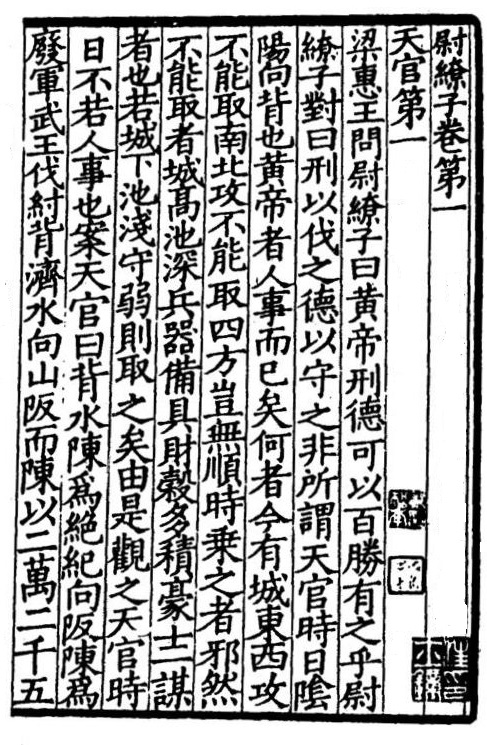
- First page of the Wei Liaozi, from a 3rd-century-BC edition
- Traditional Chinese: 尉繚子
- Simplified Chinese: 尉缭子
- Literal meaning: Master Wei Liao
Transcriptions
Standard Mandarin
- Hanyu Pinyin: Wèi Liáo zǐ
- IPA: [wêɪ ljǎʊ tsì]
Middle Chinese
- Middle Chinese: /ʔʉi^{H} leu t͡sɨ^{X}/
Old Chinese
- Zhengzhang: /*quds rewʔ ʔslɯʔ/

The Wei Liaozi (Chinese: 尉繚子) is a text on military strategy, one of the Seven Military Classics of ancient China. It was written during the Warring States period.

== History and authorship ==
The work is purportedly named after Wei Liao, who is said to have either been a student of Lord Shang or an important advisor during the Qin dynasty. However, there is little evidence to support either view. The only textual reference to Wei Liao outside of the Wei Liaozi is in the Records of the Grand Historian (Shiji), where he is cast as an advisor to Qin Shi Huang, the youthful king of the state of Qin.

Since the Wei Liaozi contains almost no actual strategy, it is thought that Wei Liao was a theoretician. Questions of authorship are further clouded by the fact that two different works of the same name appear to have been known during the Han dynasty. The work assumed its present form around the end of the fourth century BC. A new version of the Wei Liaozi was discovered in 1972 at a Han dynasty tomb in Linyi. It is more philosophical in tone than the received text, but differs significantly in only a few places.

== Content ==
The Wei Liaozi frequently advocates both a civil and military approach to affairs. According to the text, agriculture and people are the two greatest resources of the state, and both should be nurtured and provided for. Although the Wei Liaozi does not specifically mention Confucianism, the text advocates a government based on humanistic values, in line with that school of thought. The ruler should be the paragon of virtue in the state. However, heterodoxy and other values not conducive to the state should be punished using draconian measures.
