= Pacificism =

Ethical opposition to violence or war

Pacificism is the general term for ethical opposition to violence or war unless force is deemed necessary. Together with pacifism, it is born from the Western tradition or attitude that calls for peace. The latter involves the unconditional refusal to support violence, or absolute pacifism; pacificism views the prevention of violence as its duty but recognizes the controlled use of force to achieve such objective. According to Martin Ceadel, pacifism and pacificism are driven by a certain political position or ideology such as liberalism, socialism or feminism. Ceadel has categorized pacificism among positions about war and peace, ordering it among the other categories:

- Militarism (violence normalized)
- Crusading (interventionism; violence used as a tool)
- Defensivism (violence prevention)
- Pacificism (violence prevention and abolition)
- Pacifism (violence rejection)

== Development ==
Pacificism ranges between total pacifism, which usually states that killing, violence, or war is unconditionally wrong in all cases, and defensivism, which accepts all defensive acts as morally just. Pacificism states that war may ever be considered only as a firm "last resort" and condemns both aggression and militarism. In the 1940s, the two terms were not conceptually distinguished, and pacificism was considered merely an archaic spelling.

The term pacificism was first used in 1910 by William James. The distinct theory was later developed by A. J. P. Taylor in The Trouble-Makers (1957), and was subsequently defined by Ceadel in his 1987 book, Thinking About Peace and War. It was also discussed in detail in Richard Norman's book, Ethics, Killing and War. The concept came to mean "the advocacy of a peaceful policy." The largest national peace association in history, the British League of Nations Union, was pacificist rather than pacifist in orientation. Historically, the majority of peace activists have been pacificists rather than strict pacifists.

== See also ==
- Antimilitarism
- Anti-war movement
- Conflict resolution
- Conscientious objector
- Détente
- Nonkilling
- Nonviolence
- Nonviolent resistance
- Peace movement
- Self-defence in international law
- Turning the other cheek
- Violence begets violence
- War resister
