= Pacifism =

Philosophy opposing war or violence

A peace sign, which is widely associated with pacifism.

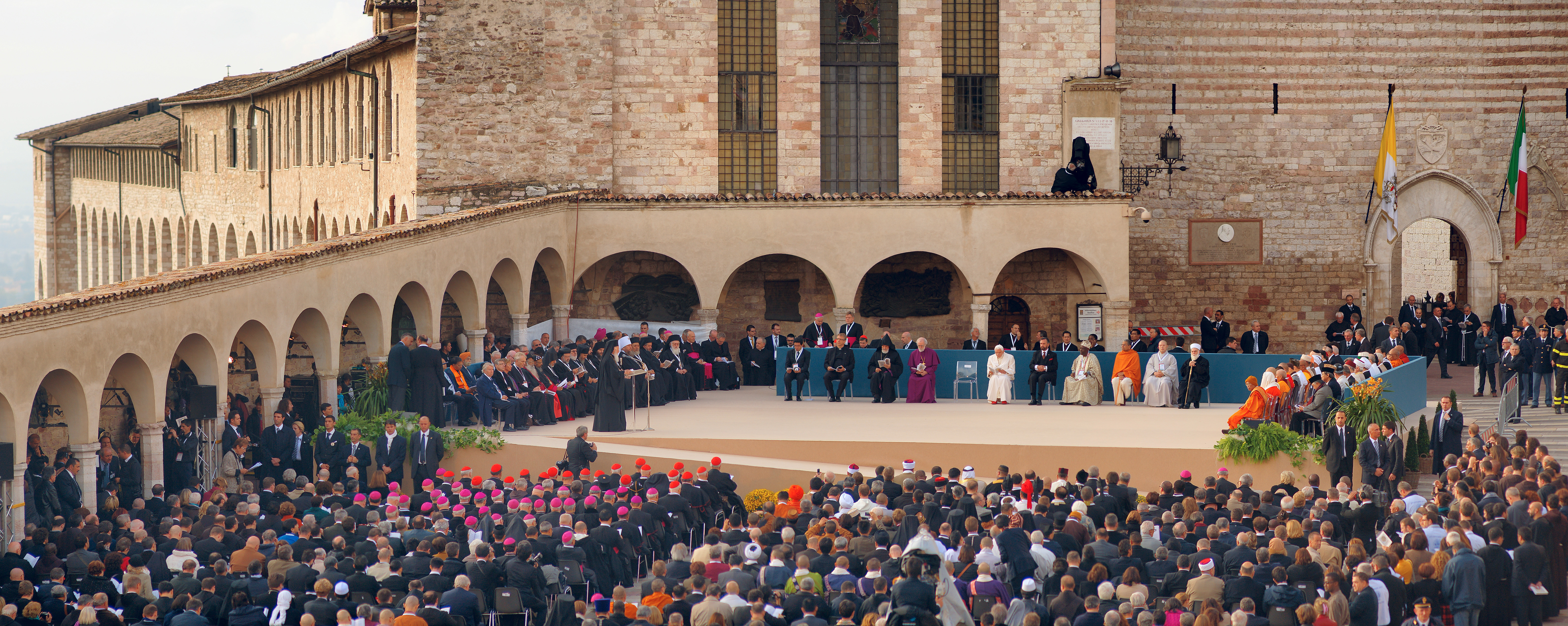
World Day of Prayer for Peace in Assisi, 2011

Pacifism is the opposition to war or violence. The word pacifism was coined by the French peace campaigner Émile Arnaud and adopted by other peace activists at the tenth Universal Peace Congress in Glasgow in 1901. A related term is ahimsa (to do no harm), which is a core philosophy in Hinduism, Buddhism, and Jainism. While modern connotations are recent, having been explicated since the 19th century, ancient references abound.

In modern times, interest was revived by Leo Tolstoy in his late works, particularly in The Kingdom of God Is Within You. Mahatma Gandhi propounded the practice of steadfast nonviolent opposition which he called "satyagraha", instrumental in its role in the Indian independence movement. Its effectiveness served as inspiration to Martin Luther King Jr., James Lawson, James Bevel, Thích Nhất Hạnh, and many others in the civil rights movement.

== Definition ==
Pacifism covers a spectrum of views, including the belief that international disputes can and should be peacefully resolved, calls for the abolition of the institutions of the military and war (institutional pacifism), opposition to any organization of society through governmental force (anarchist or libertarian pacifism), rejection of the use of physical violence to obtain political, economic or social goals, the obliteration of force, and opposition to violence under any circumstance, even defence of self and others. Historians of pacifism Peter Brock and Thomas Paul Socknat define pacifism "in the sense generally accepted in English-speaking areas" as "an unconditional rejection of all forms of warfare". Philosopher Jenny Teichman defines the main form of pacifism as "anti-warism", the rejection of all forms of warfare. Teichman's beliefs have been summarized by Brian Orend as "A pacifist rejects war and believes there are no moral grounds which can justify resorting to war. War, for the pacifist, is always wrong." In a sense the philosophy is based on the idea that the ends do not justify the means. The word pacific denotes conciliatory.

=== Moral considerations ===
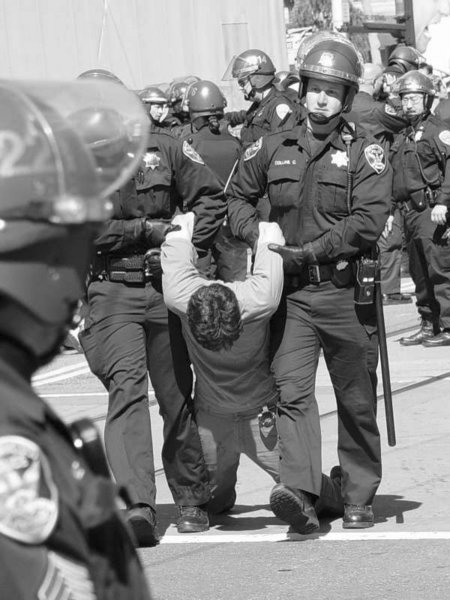
Anti-war activist arrested in San Francisco during the March 2003 protests against the war in Iraq

Pacifism may be based on moral principles (a deontological view) or pragmatism (a consequentialist view). Principled pacifism holds that at some point along the spectrum from war to interpersonal physical violence, such violence becomes morally wrong. Pragmatic pacifism holds that the costs of war and interpersonal violence are so substantial that better ways of resolving disputes must be found.

=== Nonviolence ===
Some pacifists follow principles of nonviolence, believing that nonviolent action is morally superior and/or most effective. Some however, support physical violence for emergency defence of self or others. Others support destruction of property in such emergencies or for conducting symbolic acts of resistance like pouring red paint to represent blood on the outside of military recruiting offices or entering air force bases and hammering on military aircraft.

Not all nonviolent resistance (sometimes also called civil resistance) is based on a fundamental rejection of all violence in all circumstances. Many leaders and participants in such movements, while recognizing the importance of using non-violent methods in particular circumstances, have not been absolute pacifists. Sometimes, as with the civil rights movement's march from Selma to Montgomery in 1965, they have called for armed protection. The interconnections between civil resistance and factors of force are numerous and complex.

== Types ==
=== Absolute pacifism ===
An absolute pacifist is described by the BBC as one who believes that human life is so valuable, that a human should never be killed and war should never be conducted, even in self-defence (except for non-violence type). The principle is described as difficult to abide by consistently, due to violence not being available as a tool to aid a person who is being harmed or killed. It is further claimed that such a pacifist could logically argue that violence leads to more undesirable results than non-violence.

=== Conditional pacifism ===
Tapping into just war theory, conditional pacifism represents a spectrum of positions departing from positions of absolute pacifism. One such conditional pacifism is the common pacificism, which may allow defense but is not advocating a default defensivism or even interventionism.

== Police actions and national liberation ==
Although all pacifists are opposed to war between nation states, there have been occasions where pacifists have supported military conflict in the case of civil war or revolution. For instance, during the American Civil War, both the American Peace Society and some former members of the Non-Resistance Society supported the Union's military campaign, arguing they were carrying out a "police action" against the Confederacy, whose act of Secession they regarded as criminal. Following the outbreak of the Spanish Civil War, French pacifist René Gérin urged support for the Spanish Republic. Gérin argued that the Spanish Nationalists were "comparable to an individual enemy" and the Republic's war effort was equivalent to the action of a domestic police force suppressing crime.

In the 1960s, some pacifists associated with the New Left supported wars of national liberation and supported groups such as the Viet Cong and the Algerian FLN, arguing peaceful attempts to liberate such nations were no longer viable, and war was thus the only option.

== History ==
=== Early traditions ===
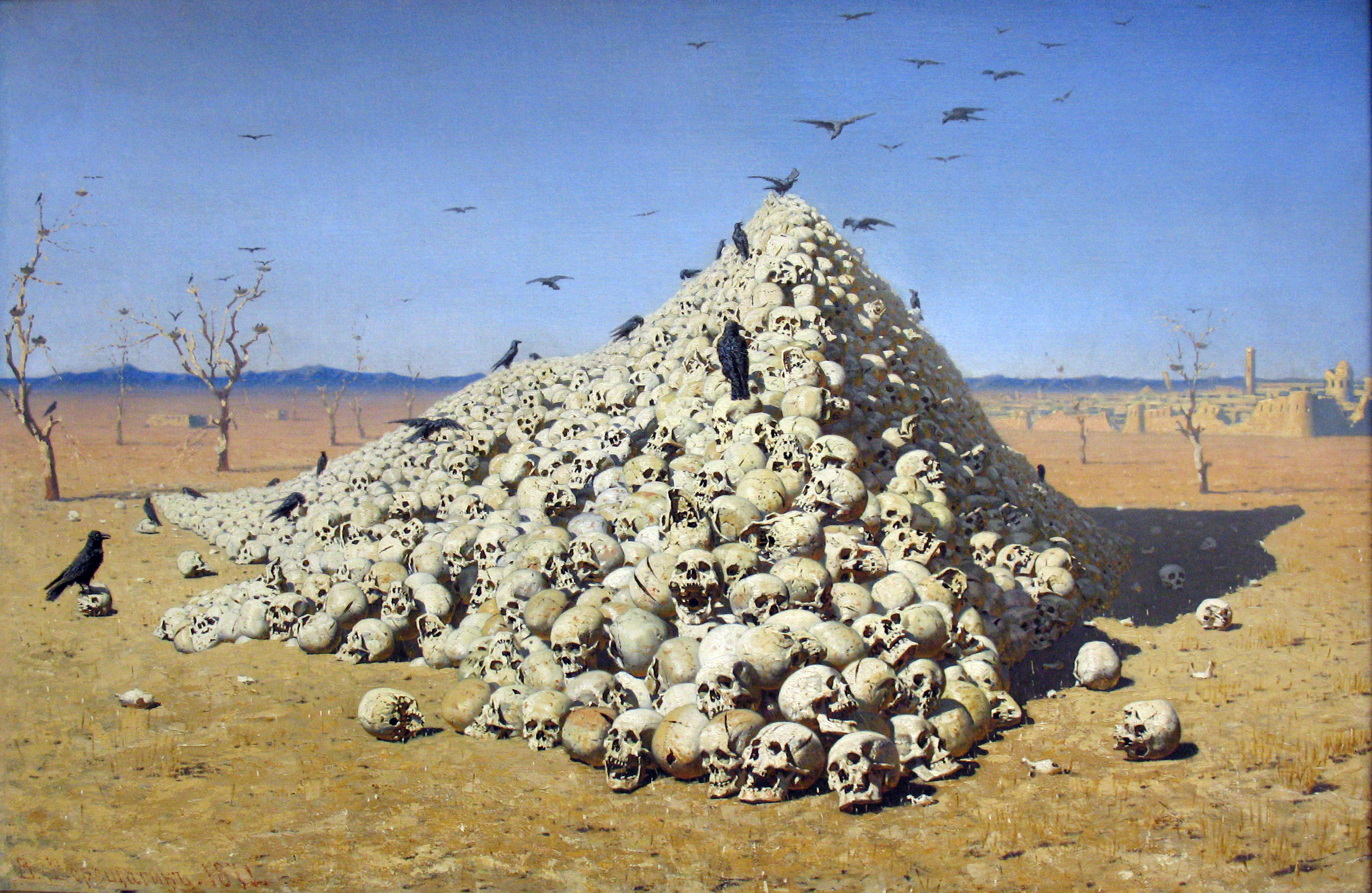
Vereshchagin's painting The Apotheosis of War (1871) came to be admired as one of the earliest artistic expressions of pacifism.

During the Warring States period in China, the pacifist Mohist School opposed aggressive war between the feudal states, using their famed defensive strategies to defend smaller states from invasion from larger states, hoping to dissuade feudal lords from costly warfare. The Seven Military Classics of ancient China view warfare negatively, and as a last resort. For example, the Three Strategies of Huang Shigong says: "As for the military, it is not an auspicious instrument; it is the way of heaven to despise it", and the Wei Liaozi writes: "As for the military, it is an inauspicious instrument; as for conflict and contention, it runs counter to virtue". The Taoist scripture "Classic of Great Peace (Taiping jing)" foretells "the coming Age of Great Peace (Taiping)". The Taiping Jing advocates "a world full of peace".

The Lemba religion of southern French Congo, along with its symbolic herb, is named for pacifism: "lemba, lemba" (peace, peace), describes the action of the plant lemba-lemba (Brillantaisia patula T. Anders). Likewise in Cabinda, "Lemba is the spirit of peace, as its name indicates."

In Ancient Greece, pacifism seems not to have existed except as a broad moral guideline against violence between individuals. Aristophanes, in his play Lysistrata, creates the scenario of an Athenian woman's anti-war sex strike during the Peloponnesian War of 431–404 BCE, and the play has gained an international reputation for its anti-war message. Nevertheless, it is both fictional and comical, and its message seems to stem from frustration with the existing conflict (then in its twentieth year) rather than from a philosophical position against violence or war. Equally fictional is the nonviolent protest of Hegetorides of Thasos. Euripides also expressed strong anti-war ideas in his work, especially The Trojan Women. In Plato's Republic Socrates makes the pacifistic argument that a just person would not harm anyone. In Plato's earlier work Crito Socrates asserts that it is not moral to return evil with further evil, an original moral conception, according to Gregory Vlastos, that undermines all justifications for war and violence.

Several Roman writers rejected the militarism of Roman society and gave voice to anti-war sentiments, including Propertius, Tibullus and Ovid. The Stoic Seneca the Younger criticised warfare in his book Naturales quaestiones (c. 65 CE). Maximilian of Tebessa was a Christian conscientious objector, killed for refusing to be conscripted.

=== Christianity ===
Throughout history many have understood Jesus of Nazareth to have been a pacifist, drawing on his Sermon on the Mount. In the sermon Jesus stated that one should "not resist an evildoer" and promoted his turn the other cheek philosophy. "If anyone strikes you on the right cheek, turn the other also; and if anyone wants to sue you and take your coat, give your cloak as well... Love your enemies, do good to those who hate you, bless those who curse you, pray for those who abuse you." When one of his apostles drew a sword to defend Jesus, Jesus told him, "Put your sword back into its place. For all who take the sword will perish by the sword" (Matthew 26:52).

There are those, however, who deny that Jesus was a pacifist and state that Jesus never said not to fight, citing examples from the New Testament. One such instance portrays an angry Jesus driving dishonest market traders from the temple. A frequently quoted passage is Luke 22:36: "He said to them, 'But now, the one who has a purse must take it, and likewise a bag. And the one who has no sword must sell his cloak and buy one.'" Pacifists have typically explained that verse as Jesus fulfilling prophecy, since in the next verse, Jesus continues to say: "It is written: 'And he was numbered with the transgressors'; and I tell you that this must be fulfilled in me. Yes, what is written about me is reaching its fulfillment." Others have interpreted the non-pacifist statements in the New Testament to be related to self-defense or to be metaphorical and state that on no occasion did Jesus shed blood or urge others to shed blood.

=== Middle Ages ===
In the Medieval era, a similar form of Christian pacifism found within the Gospel of St. Matthew reemerged in the writings of St. Francis of Assisi in 1221. In his denunciation of the religious violence which characterized the Fifth Crusade, Francis drew upon his own disillusionment as a soldier in Pope Innocent III's crusade to observe, "Blessed are the peacemakers, for they shall be called children of God (Mt.5.9). They are truly peacemakers who are able to preserve their peace of mind and heart for love of our Lord Jesus Christ, despite all they suffer in this world." According to St. Bonaventure, Francis maintained that this form of universal pacifism requires humanity to transcend a limited "theoretical" or "abstract" understanding of it as a concept, by practicing "peace through word and through the example of one's own life." In this sense, Christian pacifism for St. Francis was yet another expression of a reverence for all living creatures of the natural world as outlined within his Canticle of the Sun.

=== Modern history ===
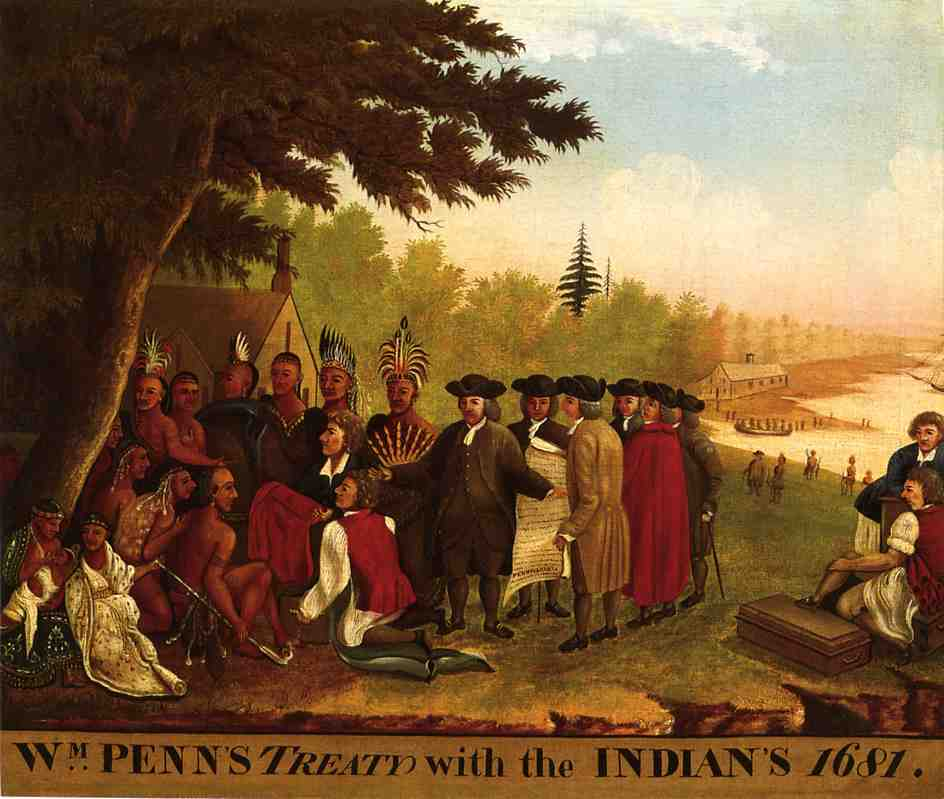
Penn's Treaty with the Lenape

Beginning in the 16th century, the Protestant Reformation gave rise to a variety of new Christian sects, including the historic peace churches. Foremost among them were the Religious Society of Friends (Quakers), Amish, Mennonites, Hutterites, and Church of the Brethren. The humanist writer Desiderius Erasmus was one of the most outspoken pacifists of the Renaissance, arguing strongly against warfare in his essays The Praise of Folly (1509) and The Complaint of Peace (1517).

The Quakers were prominent advocates of pacifism, who as early as 1660 had repudiated violence in all forms and adhered to a strictly pacifist interpretation of Christianity. Throughout the many 18th century wars in which Great Britain participated, the Quakers maintained a principled commitment not to serve in the army and militia or even to pay the alternative £10 fine. The English Quaker William Penn, who founded the Province of Pennsylvania, employed an anti-militarist public policy. Unlike residents of many of the colonies, Quakers chose to trade peacefully with the Native Americans, including for land. The colonial province was, for the 75 years from 1681 to 1756, essentially unarmed and experienced little or no warfare in that period.

From the 16th to the 18th centuries, a number of thinkers devised plans for an international organisation that would promote peace, and reduce or even eliminate the occurrence of war. These included the French politician Duc de Sully, the philosophers Émeric Crucé and the Abbe de Saint-Pierre, and the English Quakers William Penn and John Bellers.

The Moriori, of the Chatham Islands, practiced pacifism by order of their ancestor Nunuku-whenua. This enabled the Moriori to preserve what limited resources they had in their harsh climate, avoiding waste through warfare. In turn, this led to their almost complete annihilation in 1835 by invading Ngāti Mutunga and Ngāti Tama Māori from the Taranaki region of the North Island of New Zealand. The invading Māori killed, enslaved and cannibalised the Moriori. A Moriori survivor recalled: "[The Maori] commenced to kill us like sheep... [We] were terrified, fled to the bush, concealed ourselves in holes underground, and in any place to escape our enemies. It was of no avail; we were discovered and killed – men, women and children indiscriminately."

Pacifist ideals emerged from two strands of thought that coalesced at the end of the 18th century. One, rooted in the secular Enlightenment, promoted peace as the rational antidote to the world's ills, while the other was a part of the evangelical religious revival that had played an important part in the campaign for the abolition of slavery. Representatives of the former included Jean-Jacques Rousseau, in Extrait du Projet de Paix Perpetuelle de Monsieur l'Abbe Saint-Pierre (1756), Immanuel Kant, in his Thoughts on Perpetual Peace, and Jeremy Bentham who proposed the formation of a peace association in 1789. Representative of the latter, was William Wilberforce who thought that strict limits should be imposed on British involvement in the French Revolutionary Wars based on Christian ideals of peace and brotherhood. Bohemian Bernard Bolzano taught about the social waste of militarism and the needlessness of war. He urged a total reform of the educational, social, and economic systems that would direct the nation's interests toward peace rather than toward armed conflict between nations.

During the late nineteenth and early twentieth centuries, pacifism was not entirely frowned upon throughout Europe. It was considered a political stance against costly capitalist-imperialist wars, a notion particularly popular in the British Liberal Party of the twentieth century. However, during the eras of World War One and especially World War Two, public opinion on the ideology split. Those against the Second World War, some argued, were not fighting against unnecessary wars of imperialism but instead acquiescing to the fascists of Germany, Italy and Japan.

==== Peace movements ====
During the period of the Napoleonic Wars, although no formal peace movement was established until the end of hostilities, a significant peace movement animated by universalist ideals did emerge, due to the perception of Britain fighting in a reactionary role and the increasingly visible impact of the war on the welfare of the nation in the form of higher taxation levels and high casualty rates. Sixteen peace petitions to Parliament were signed by members of the public, anti-war and anti-Pitt demonstrations convened and peace literature was widely published and disseminated.

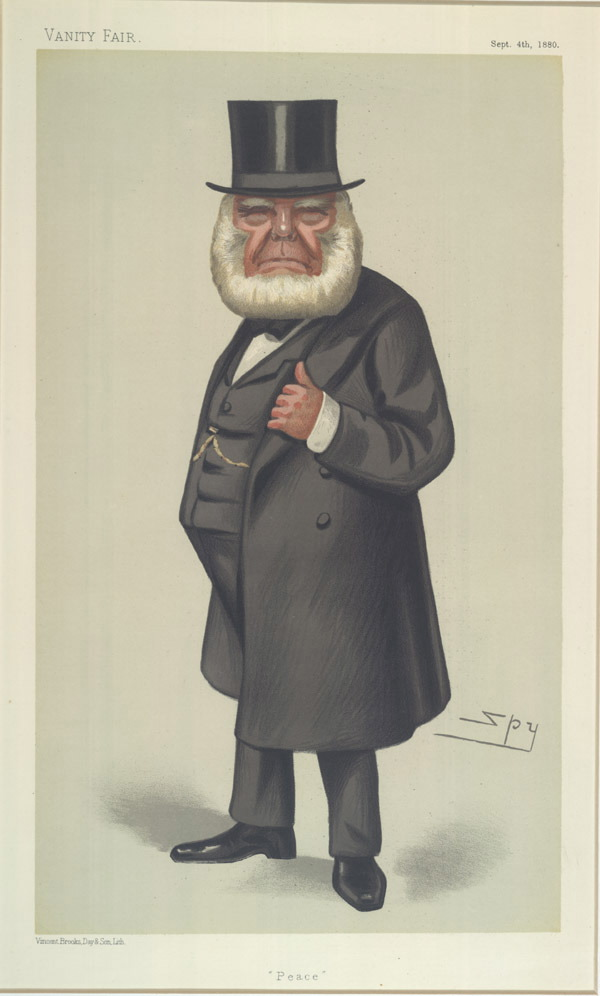
"Peace". Caricature of Henry Richard, a prominent advocate of pacifism in the mid-19th century

The first peace movements appeared in 1815–16. In the United States the first such movement was the New York Peace Society, founded in 1815 by the theologian David Low Dodge, and the Massachusetts Peace Society. It became an active organization, holding regular weekly meetings, and producing literature which was spread as far as Gibraltar and Malta, describing the horrors of war and advocating pacificism on Christian grounds. The London Peace Society (also known as the Society for the Promotion of Permanent and Universal Peace) was formed in 1816 to promote permanent and universal peace by the philanthropist William Allen. In the 1840s, British women formed "Olive Leaf Circles", groups of around 15 to 20 women, to discuss and promote pacifist ideas.

The peace movement began to grow in influence by the mid-nineteenth century. The London Peace Society, under the initiative of American consul Elihu Burritt and the reverend Henry Richard, convened the first International Peace Congress in London in 1843. The congress decided on two aims: the ideal of peaceable arbitration in the affairs of nations and the creation of an international institution to achieve that. Richard became the secretary of the Peace Society in 1850 on a full-time basis, a position which he would keep for the next 40 years, earning himself a reputation as the 'Apostle of Peace'. He helped secure one of the earliest victories for the peace movement by securing a commitment from the Great Powers in the Treaty of Paris (1856) at the end of the Crimean War, in favour of arbitration. On the European continent, wracked by social upheaval, the first peace congress was held in Brussels in 1848 followed by Paris a year later.

After experiencing a recession in support due to the resurgence of militarism during the American Civil War and Crimean War, the movement began to spread across Europe and began to infiltrate the new socialist movements. In 1870, Randal Cremer formed the Workman's Peace Association in London. Cremer, alongside the French economist Frédéric Passy was also the founding father of the first international organisation for the arbitration of conflicts in 1889, the Inter-Parliamentary Union. The National Peace Council was founded in after the 17th Universal Peace Congress in London (July August 1908).

An important thinker who contributed to pacifist ideology was Russian writer Leo Tolstoy. In one of his latter works, The Kingdom of God Is Within You, Tolstoy provides a detailed history, account and defense of pacifism. Tolstoy's work inspired a movement named after him advocating pacifism to arise in Russia and elsewhere. The book was a major early influence on Mahatma Gandhi, and the two engaged in regular correspondence while Gandhi was active in South Africa.

Bertha von Suttner, the first woman to be a Nobel Peace Prize laureate, became a leading figure in the peace movement with the publication of her novel, Die Waffen nieder! ("Lay Down Your Arms!") in 1889 and founded an Austrian pacifist organization in 1891.

==== Nonviolent resistance ====
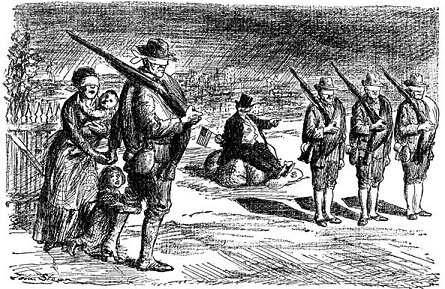
"Leading Citizens want War and declare War; Citizens Who are Led fight the War" 1910 cartoon

In colonial New Zealand, during the latter half of the 19th century European settlers used numerous tactics to confiscate land from the indigenous Māori, including warfare. In the 1870s and 1880s, Parihaka, then reported to be the largest Māori settlement in New Zealand, became the centre of a major campaign of non-violent resistance to land confiscations. One Māori leader, Te Whiti-o-Rongomai, quickly became the leading figure in the movement, stating in a speech that "Though some, in darkness of heart, seeing their land ravished, might wish to take arms and kill the aggressors, I say it must not be. Let not the Pakehas think to succeed by reason of their guns... I want not war". Te Whiti-o-Rongomai achieved renown for his non-violent tactics among the Māori, which proved more successful in preventing land confiscations than acts of violent resistance.

Mahatma Gandhi was a major political and spiritual leader of India, instrumental in the Indian independence movement. The Nobel prize winning great poet Rabindranath Tagore, who was also an Indian, gave him the honorific "Mahatma", usually translated "Great Soul". He was the pioneer of a brand of nonviolence (or ahimsa) which he called satyagraha – translated literally as "truth force". This was the resistance of tyranny through civil disobedience that was not only nonviolent but also sought to change the heart of the opponent. He contrasted this with duragraha, "resistant force", which sought only to change behaviour with stubborn protest. During his 30 years of work (1917–1947) for the independence of his country from British colonial rule, Gandhi led dozens of nonviolent campaigns, spent over seven years in prison, and staged several hunger strikes to pressure British authorities to comply with his demands or to stop inter-communal violence. His efforts helped lead India to independence in 1947, and inspired movements for civil rights and freedom worldwide.

==== World War I ====
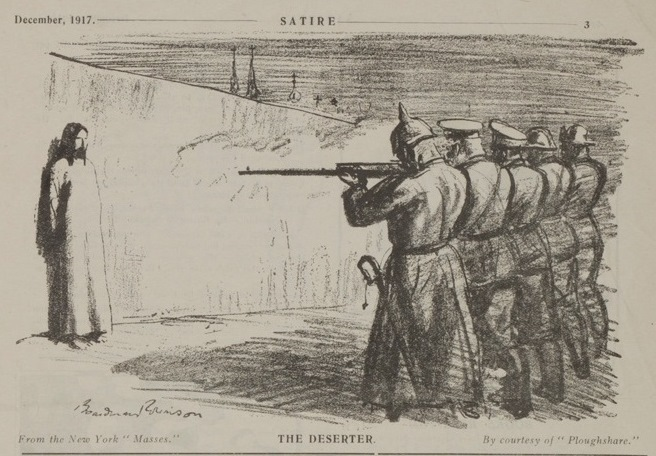
The Deserter (1916) by Boardman Robinson

Peace movements became active in the Western world after 1900, often focusing on treaties that would settle disputes through arbitration, and efforts to support the Hague conventions.

The sudden outbreak of the First World War in July 1914 dismayed the peace movement. Socialist parties in every industrial nation had committed themselves to antiwar policies, but when the war came, all of them, except in Russia and the United States, supported their own governments. There were highly publicized dissidents, some of whom were imprisoned for opposing draft laws, such as Eugene Debs in the U.S. In Britain, the prominent activist Stephen Henry Hobhouse was jailed for refusing military service, citing his convictions as a "socialist and a Christian". Many socialist groups and movements were antimilitarist, arguing that war by its nature was a type of governmental coercion of the working class for the benefit of capitalist elites. The French socialist pacifist leader Jean Jaurès was assassinated by a nationalist fanatic on 31 July 1914. The national parties in the Second International increasingly supported their respective nations in war, and the International was dissolved in 1916.

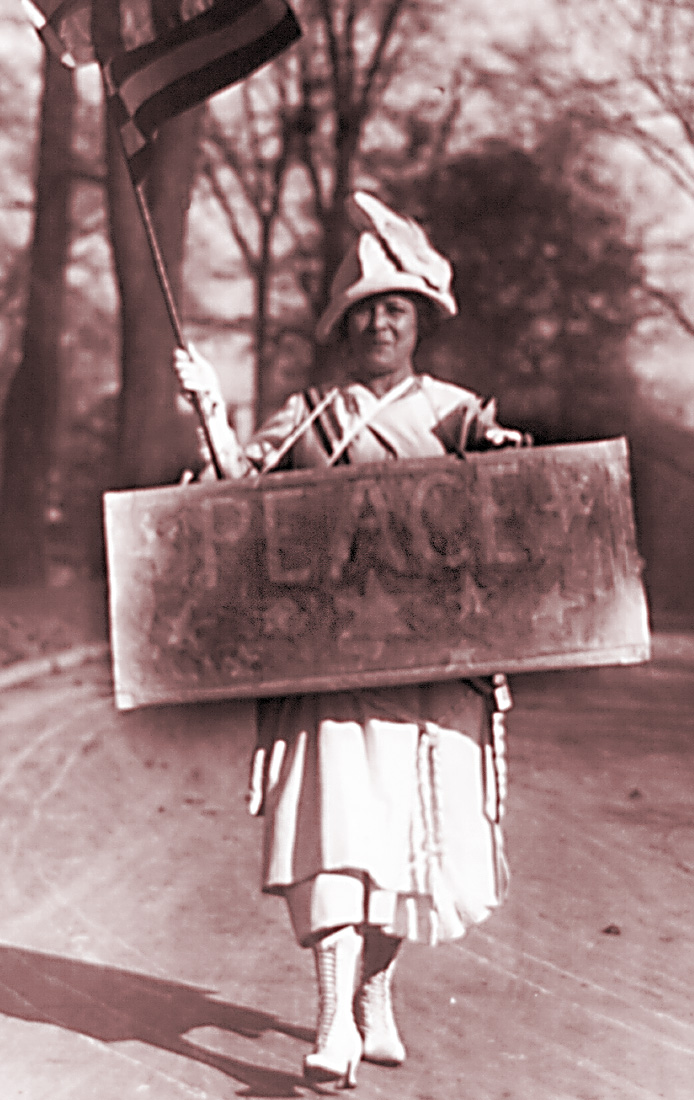
A World War I-era female peace protester

In 1915, the League of Nations Society was formed by British liberal leaders to promote a strong international organisation that could enforce the peaceful resolution of conflict. Later that year, the League to Enforce Peace was established in the U.S. to promote similar goals. Hamilton Holt published a 28 September 1914, editorial in his magazine the Independent called "The Way to Disarm: A Practical Proposal" that called for an international organization to agree upon the arbitration of disputes and to guarantee the territorial integrity of its members by maintaining military forces sufficient to defeat those of any non-member. The ensuing debate among prominent internationalists modified Holt's plan to align it more closely with proposals offered in Great Britain by Viscount James Bryce, a former British ambassador to the United States. These and other initiatives were pivotal in the change in attitudes that gave birth to the League of Nations after the war.

In addition to the traditional peace churches, some of the many groups that protested against the war were the Woman's Peace Party (which was organized in 1915 and led by noted reformer Jane Addams), the International Committee of Women for Permanent Peace (ICWPP) (also organized in 1915), the American Union Against Militarism, the Fellowship of Reconciliation and the American Friends Service Committee. Jeannette Rankin, the first woman elected to Congress, was another fierce advocate of pacifism, the only person to vote against American entrance into both wars.

==== Between the two World Wars ====
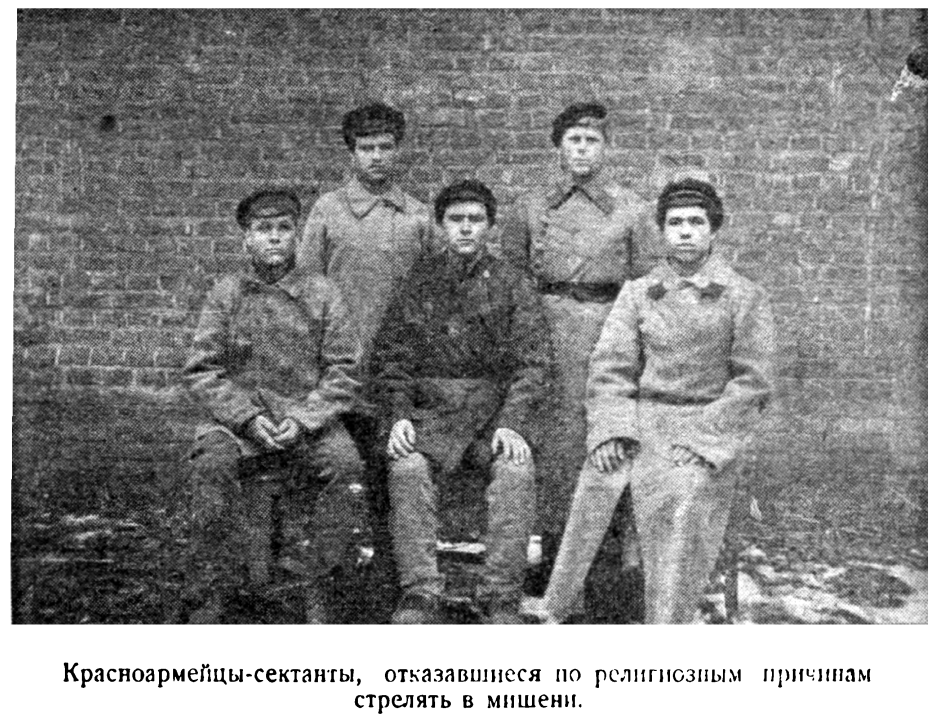
The soldiers of the Red Army in Russia, who on religious grounds refused to shoot at the target (evangelicals or Baptists). Between 1918 and 1929

After the immense loss of nearly ten million men to trench warfare, a sweeping change of attitude toward militarism crashed over Europe, particularly in nations such as Great Britain, where many questioned its involvement in the war. After World War I's official end in 1918, peace movements across the continent and the United States renewed, gradually gaining popularity among young Europeans who grew up in the shadow of Europe's trauma over the Great War. Organizations formed in this period included the War Resisters' International, the Women's International League for Peace and Freedom, the No More War Movement, the Service Civil International and the Peace Pledge Union (PPU). The League of Nations also convened several disarmament conferences in the interbellum period such as the Geneva Conference, though the support that pacifist policy and idealism received varied across European nations. These organizations and movements attracted tens of thousands of Europeans, spanning most professions including "scientists, artists, musicians, politicians, clerks, students, activists and thinkers."

===== Great Britain =====
Pacifism and revulsion with war were very popular sentiments in 1920s Britain. Novels and poems on the theme of the futility of war and the slaughter of the youth by old fools were published, including, Death of a Hero by Richard Aldington, Erich Remarque's translated All Quiet on the Western Front and Beverley Nichols's expose Cry Havoc. A debate at the University of Oxford in 1933 on the motion 'one must fight for King and country' captured the changed mood when the motion was resoundingly defeated. Dick Sheppard established the Peace Pledge Union in 1934, which totally renounced war and aggression. The idea of collective security was also popular; instead of outright pacifism, the public generally exhibited a determination to stand up to aggression, but preferably with the use of economic sanctions and multilateral negotiations. Many members of the Peace Pledge Union later joined the Bruderhof during its period of residence in the Cotswolds, where Englishmen and Germans, many of whom were Jewish, lived side by side despite local persecution.

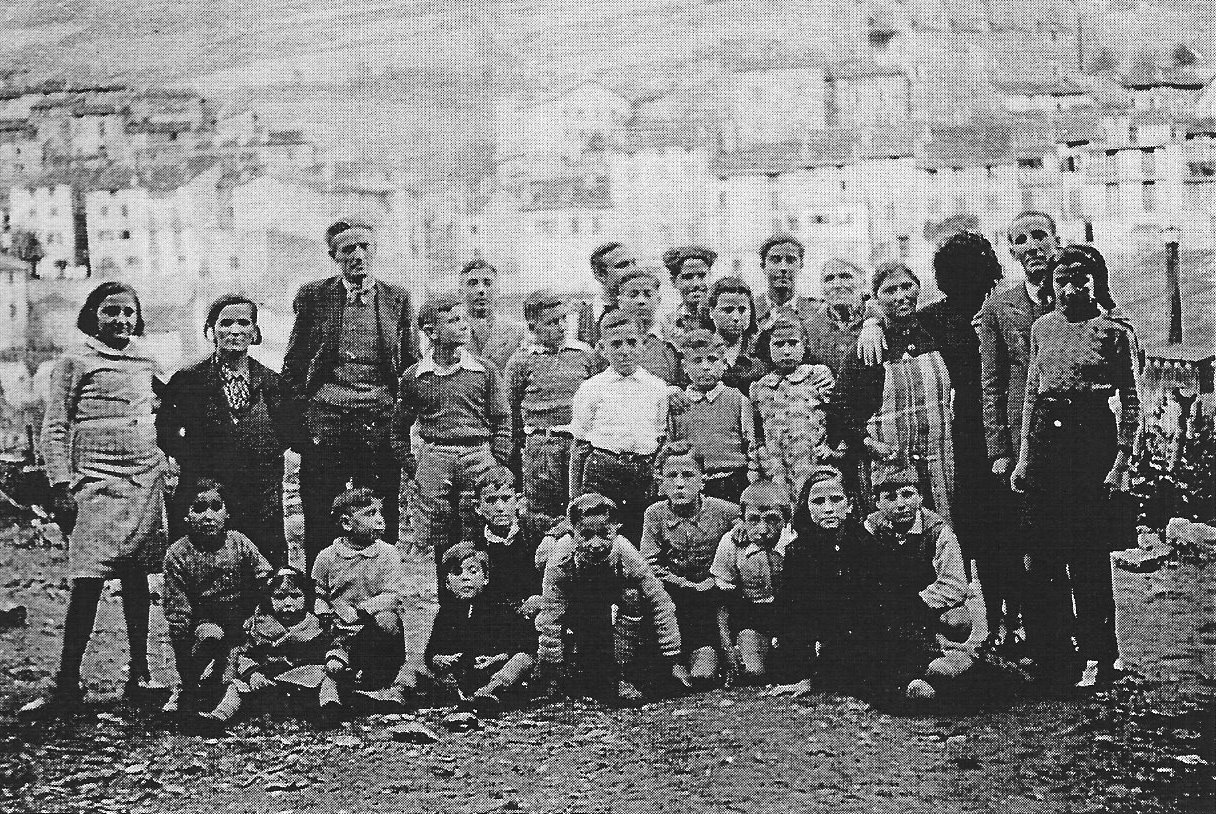
Refugees from the Spanish Civil War at the War Resisters' International children's refuge in the French Pyrenees

The British Labour Party had a strong pacifist wing in the early 1930s, and between 1931 and 1935 it was led by George Lansbury, a Christian pacifist who later chaired the No More War Movement and was president of the PPU. The 1933 annual conference resolved unanimously to "pledge itself to take no part in war". Researcher Richard Toye writes that "Labour's official position, however, although based on the aspiration towards a world socialist commonwealth and the outlawing of war, did not imply a renunciation of force under all circumstances, but rather support for the ill-defined concept of 'collective security' under the League of Nations. At the same time, on the party's left, Stafford Cripps's small but vocal Socialist League opposed the official policy, on the non-pacifist ground that the League of Nations was 'nothing but the tool of the satiated imperialist powers'."

Lansbury was eventually persuaded to resign as Labour leader by the non-pacifist wing of the party and was replaced by Clement Attlee. As the threat from Nazi Germany increased in the 1930s, the Labour Party abandoned its pacifist position and supported rearmament, largely as the result of the efforts of Ernest Bevin and Hugh Dalton, who by 1937 had also persuaded the party to oppose Neville Chamberlain's policy of appeasement.

The League of Nations attempted to play its role in ensuring world peace in the 1920s and 1930s. However, with the increasingly revisionist and aggressive behaviour of Nazi Germany, Fascist Italy and Imperial Japan, it ultimately failed to maintain such a world order. Economic sanctions were used against states that committed aggression, such as those against Italy when it invaded Abyssinia, but there was no will on the part of the principal League powers, Britain and France, to subordinate their interests to a multilateral process or to disarm at all themselves.

===== Spain =====
The Spanish Civil War proved a major test for international pacifism, and the work of pacifist organisations (such as War Resisters' International and the Fellowship of Reconciliation) and individuals (such as José Brocca and Amparo Poch) in that arena has until recently been ignored or forgotten by historians, overshadowed by the memory of the International Brigades and other militaristic interventions. Shortly after the war ended, Simone Weil, despite having volunteered for service on the republican side, went on to publish The Iliad or the Poem of Force, a work that has been described as a pacifist manifesto. In response to the threat of fascism, some pacifist thinkers, such as Richard B. Gregg, devised plans for a campaign of nonviolent resistance in the event of a fascist invasion or takeover.

===== Germany =====
As Germany dealt with the burdens of the Treaty of Versailles, a conflict arose in the 1930s between German Christianity and German nationalism. Many Germans found the terms of the treaty debilitating and humiliating, so German nationalism offered a way to regain the country's pride. German Christianity warned against the risks of entering a war similar to the previous one. As the German depression worsened and fascism began to rise in Germany, a greater tide of Germans began to sway toward Adolf Hitler's brand of nationalism that would come to crush pacifism.

==== World War II ====
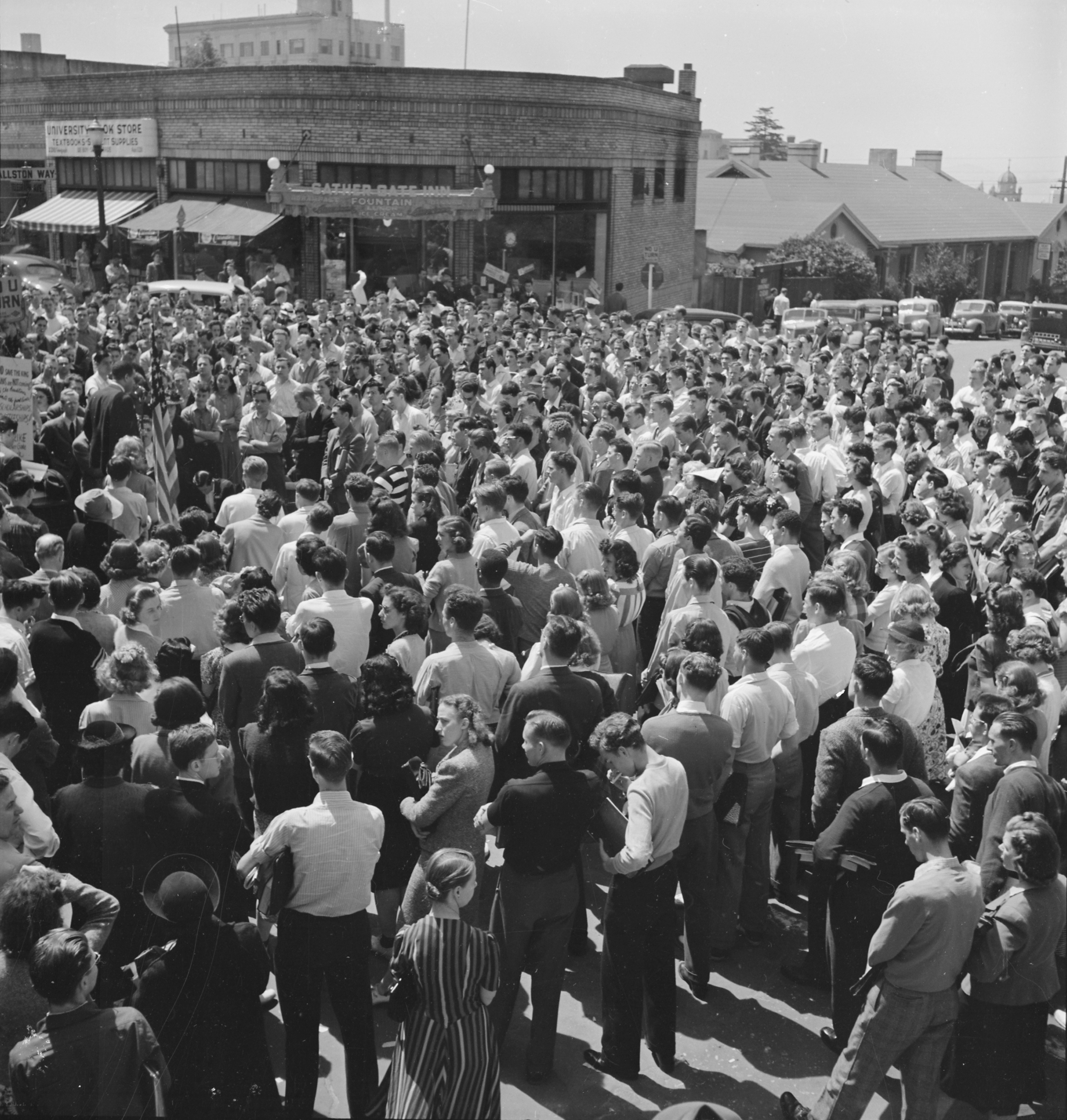
A peace strike rally at University of California, Berkeley, April 1940

With the start of World War II, pacifist and antiwar sentiment declined in nations affected by the war. Even the communist-controlled American Peace Mobilization reversed its antiwar activism once Germany invaded the Soviet Union in 1941. After the Japanese attack on Pearl Harbor, the non-interventionist America First Committee dropped its opposition to American involvement in the war and disbanded, but many smaller religious and socialist groups continued their opposition to war.

===== Great Britain =====
Bertrand Russell argued that the necessity of defeating Hitler and the Nazis was a unique circumstance in which war was not the worst of the possible evils; he called his position relative pacifism. Shortly before the outbreak of war, British writers such as E. M. Forster, Leonard Woolf, David Garnett and Storm Jameson all rejected their earlier pacifism and endorsed military action against Nazism. Similarly, Albert Einstein wrote: "I loathe all armies and any kind of violence; yet I'm firmly convinced that at present these hateful weapons offer the only effective protection." The British pacifists Reginald Sorensen and Cecil John Cadoux, while bitterly disappointed by the outbreak of war, nevertheless urged their fellow pacifists "not to obstruct the war effort."

Pacifists across Great Britain further struggled to uphold their anti-military values during the Blitz, a coordinated, long-term attack by the Luftwaffe on Great Britain. As the country was ravaged nightly by German bombing raids, pacifists had to seriously weigh the importance of their political and moral values against the desire to protect their nation.

===== France =====
France collapsed quickly after Germany invaded in 1940. Pacifism was not well organized. The government in the 1930s tried to save money by reducing support to the military, even as Hitler was rejecting the restraints France had tried to impose and boldly rebuilt a powerful offensive force. War anxiety and defeatism was rampant in 1940, not pacifism.

There was little pacifism under the pro-Nazi Vichy regime,. However two pacifists André and Magda Trocmé helped conceal hundreds of Jews fleeing the Nazis in the village of Le Chambon-sur-Lignon. After the war, the Trocmés were declared Righteous Among the Nations.

===== Germany =====
Pacifists in Nazi Germany were dealt with harshly, reducing the movement into almost nonexistence; those who continued to advocate for the end of the war and violence were often sent to labor camps; German pacifist Carl von Ossietzky and Olaf Kullmann, a Norwegian pacifist active during the Nazi occupation, were both imprisoned in concentration camps and died as a result of their mistreatment there. Austrian farmer Franz Jägerstätter was executed in 1943 for refusing to serve in the Wehrmacht.

German nationalism consumed even the most peaceful of Christians, who may have believed that Hitler was acting in the good faith of Germany or who may have been so suppressed by the Nazi regime that they were content to act as bystanders to the violence occurring around them. Dietrich Bonhoeffer, an anti-Nazi German pastor who later died in 1945 in the Flossenbürg concentration camp, once wrote in a letter to his grandmother: "The issue really is: Germanism or Christianity."

After the end of the war, it was discovered that "The Black Book" or Sonderfahndungsliste G.B., a list of Britons to be arrested in the event of a successful German invasion of Britain, included three active pacifists: Vera Brittain, Sybil Thorndike and Aldous Huxley (who had left the country).

===== Conscientious objectors =====
There were conscientious objectors and war tax resisters in both World War I and World War II. The United States government allowed sincere objectors to serve in noncombatant military roles. However, those draft resisters who refused any cooperation with the war effort often spent much of the wars in federal prisons. During World War II, pacifist leaders such as Dorothy Day and Ammon Hennacy of the Catholic Worker Movement urged young Americans not to enlist in military service.

During the two world wars, young men conscripted into the military, but who refused to take up arms, were called conscientious objectors. Though these men had to either answer their conscription or face prison time, their status as conscientious objectors permitted them to refuse to take part in battle using weapons, and the military was forced to find a different use for them. Often, these men were assigned various tasks close to battle such as medical duties, though some were assigned various civilian jobs including farming, forestry, hospital work and mining. Conscientious objectors were often viewed by soldiers as cowards and liars, and they were sometimes accused of shirking military duty out of fear rather than as the result of conscience. In Great Britain during World War II, the majority of the public did not approve of moral objection by soldiers but supported their right to abstain from direct combat. On the more extreme sides of public opinion were those who fully supported the objectors and those who believed they should be executed as traitors. The World War II objectors were often scorned as fascist sympathizers and traitors, though many of them cited the influence of World War I and their shell shocked fathers as major reasons for refusing to participate.

==== Later 20th century ====
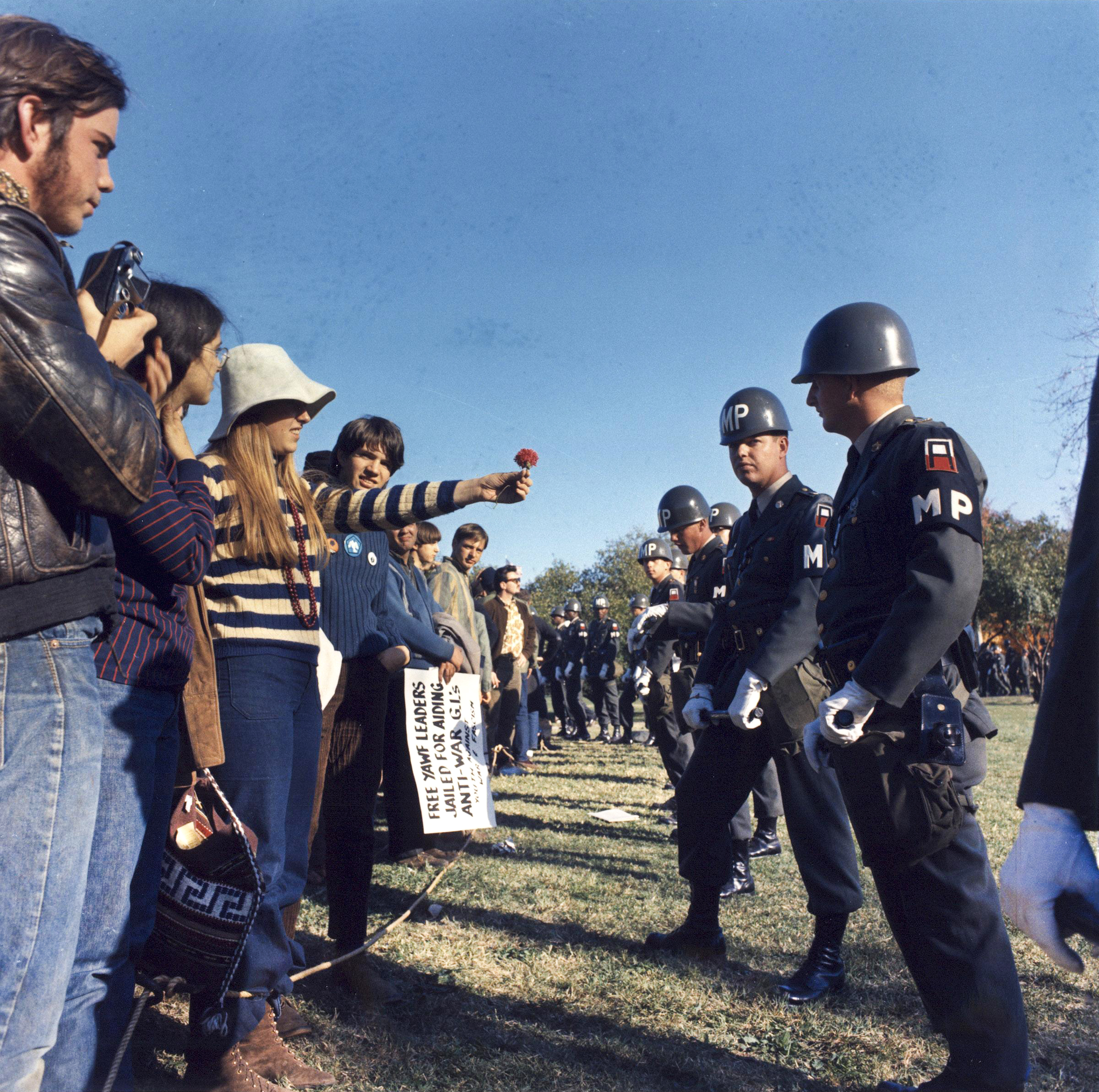
A demonstrator offers a flower to military police at an anti-Vietnam War protest, 1967.

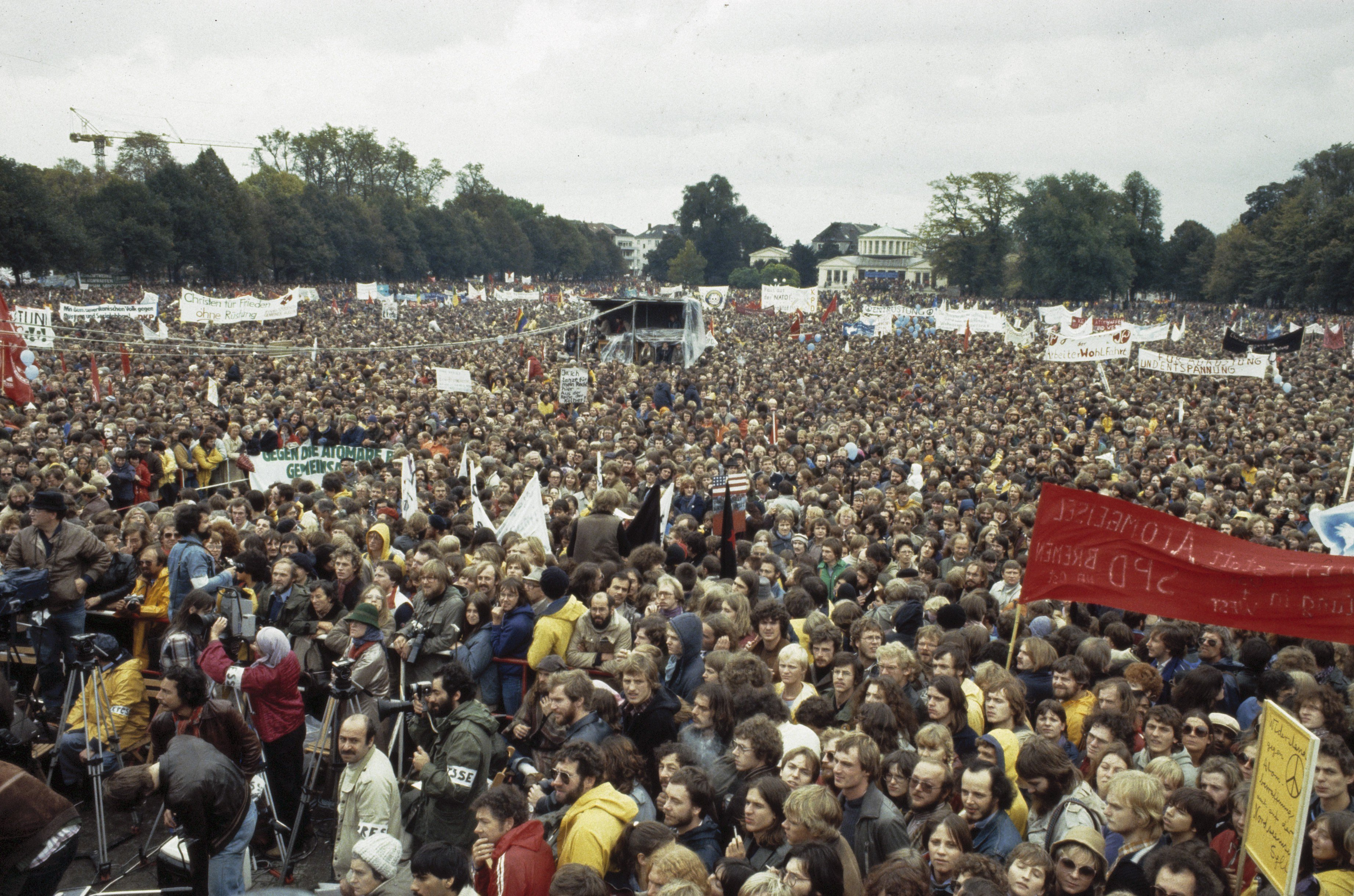
Protest against the deployment of Pershing II missiles in Europe, Bonn, West Germany, 1981

Baptist minister Martin Luther King Jr. led a civil rights movement in the U.S., employing Gandhian nonviolent resistance to repeal laws enforcing racial segregation and to work for integration of schools, businesses and government. In 1957, his wife Coretta Scott King, along with Albert Schweitzer, Benjamin Spock and others, formed the Committee for a Sane Nuclear Policy (now Peace Action) to resist the nuclear arms race. In 1958 British activists formed the Campaign for Nuclear Disarmament with Bertrand Russell as its president.

In the United States in the 1960s opponents of the Vietnam War began demonstrating locally especially on college campuses. On May 19, 1963, the New York Times reported: "Peace groups bud (and wither) with such frequency that even the experts can't keep track of them. They come in all shapes and sizes–professional groups... religious groups, demonstrators and nondemonstrators, sophisticated groups and peacenik amateurs."

Martin Luther King, in a famous April 4, 1967, speech at Riverside Church in New York City, publicly questioned the U.S. involvement in Vietnam for the first time.

===== Asia =====
Other examples from this period include the 1986 People Power Revolution in the Philippines led by Corazon Aquino. Worldwide attention focused on China where the 1989 Tiananmen Square protests, with the broadly publicized "Tank Man" incident as its indelible image.

===== Latin America =====
On 1 December 1948, President José Figueres Ferrer of Costa Rica abolished the Costa Rican military. In 1949, the abolition of the military was introduced in Article 12 of the Costa Rican constitution. The budget previously dedicated to the military is now dedicated to providing healthcare services and education.

===== Theorists =====
Several academic philosophers endeavored to demonstrate that the theoretical principles underlying secular pacifism could be successfully applied in order to resolve several unique forms of international conflict which emerged as the 20th century came to a close. Included in this group is Robert L. Holmes, who illustrates that four principles of "moral personalism" can be utilized within the context of both nuclear war and terrorism in order to promote an ethically viable outcome. He further argues that waging war in the modern era is unjustifiable when considered in its totality and that by transcending the particular perceptions of injustice in a conflict it is possible to be a "pragmatic pacifist".

==== Antiwar literature of the 20th century ====
- Edmund Blunden's Undertones of War (1928).
- Robert Graves's Good-Bye to All That (1929).
- Erich Marie Remarque's All Quiet on the Western Front (1929).
- Beverley Nichols's Cry Havoc! (1933).
- A.A. Milne's Peace with Honour (1934).
- Aldous Huxley's Ends and Means (1937).
- Robert L. Holmes', On War and Morality (1989).

== Religious attitudes ==
=== Baháʼí Faith ===
Bahá'u'lláh, the founder of the Baháʼí Faith abolished holy war and emphasized its abolition as a central teaching of his faith. However, the Baháʼí Faith does not have an absolute pacifistic position. For example, Baháʼís are advised to do social service instead of active army service, but when this is not possible because of obligations in certain countries, the Baháʼí law of loyalty to one's government is preferred and the individual should perform the army service. Shoghi Effendi, the head of the Baháʼí Faith in the first half of the 20th century, noted that in the Baháʼí view, absolute pacifists are anti-social and exalt the individual over society which could lead to anarchy; instead he noted that the Baháʼí conception of social life follows a moderate view where the individual is not suppressed or exalted.

On the level of society, Bahá'u'lláh promotes the principle of collective security, which does not abolish the use of force, but prescribes "a system in which Force is made the servant of Justice". The idea of collective security from the Bahá'í teachings states that if a government violates a fundamental norm of international law or provision of a future world constitution which Bahá'ís believe will be established by all nations, then the other governments should step in.

=== Buddhism ===
Ahimsa (do no harm), is a primary virtue in Buddhism (as well as other Indian religions such as Hinduism and Jainism). This leads to a misconception that Buddhism is a religion based solely on peace; however, like all religions, there is a long history of violence in various Buddhist traditions and many examples of prolonged violence in its 2,500-year existence. Like many religious scholars and believers of other religions, many Buddhists disavow any connection between their religion and the violence committed in its name or by its followers, and find various ways of dealing with problematic texts.

Notable pacifists or peace activists within Buddhist traditions include Thích Nhất Hạnh who advocated for peace in response to the Vietnam War, founded the Plum Village Tradition, and helped popularize engaged Buddhism, Robert Baker Aitken and Anne Hopkins Aitken who founded the Buddhist Peace Fellowship, Cheng Yen founder of the Tzu Chi Foundation, Bhikkhu Bodhi American Theravada Buddhist monk and founder of Buddhist Global Relief, Thai activist and author Sulak Sivaraksa, Cambodian activist Preah Maha Ghosananda. and Japanese activist and peace pagoda builder Nichidatsu Fujii.

=== Christianity ===
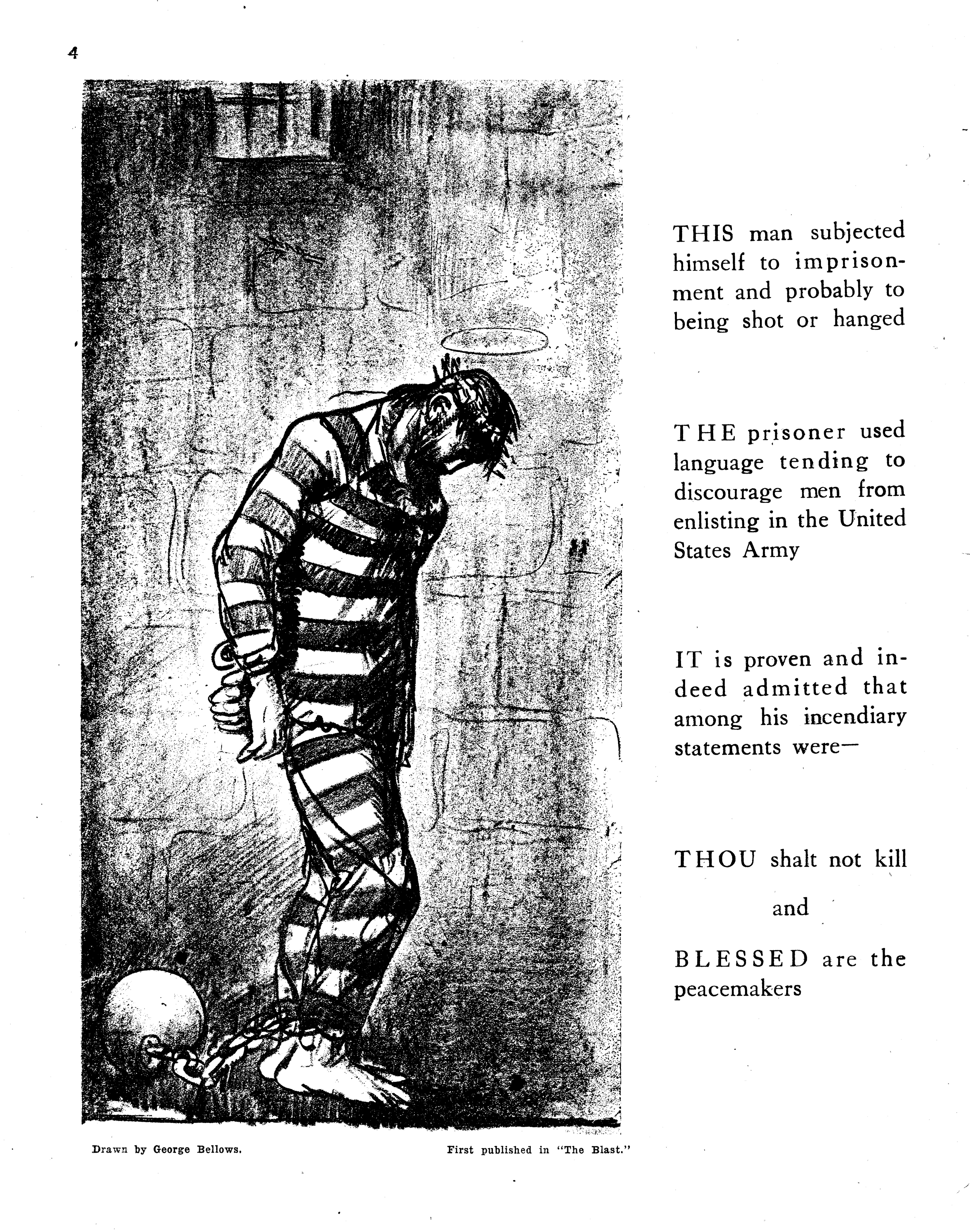
Blessed are the Peacemakers (1917) by George Bellows

==== Peace churches ====
Peace churches are Christian denominations explicitly advocating pacifism. The term "historic peace churches" refers specifically to three church traditions: the Church of the Brethren, the Mennonites (and other Anabaptists, such as the Amish, Hutterites and Apostolic Christian Church), as well as the Quakers (Religious Society of Friends). The historic peace churches have, from their origins as far back as the 16th century, always taken the position that Jesus was himself a pacifist who explicitly taught and practiced pacifism, and that his followers must do likewise. Pacifist churches vary on whether physical force can ever be justified in self-defense or protecting others, as many adhere strictly to nonresistance when confronted by violence. But all agree that violence on behalf of a country or a government is prohibited for Christians.

==== Holiness movement ====
The Emmanuel Association of Churches, Immanuel Missionary Church, Church of God (Guthrie, Oklahoma), First Bible Holiness Church, and Christ's Sanctified Holy Church are denominations in the holiness movement (which is largely Methodist with a minority from other backgrounds such as Quaker, Anabaptist and Restorationist) known for their opposition to war today; they are known as "holiness pacifists". The Emmanuel Association teaches:

We feel bound explicitly to avow our unshaken persuasion that War is utterly incompatible with the plain precepts of our divine Lord and Law-giver, and with the whole spirit of the Gospel; and that no plea of necessity or policy, however urgent or peculiar, can avail to release either individuals or nations for the paramount allegiance which they owe to Him who hath said, "Love your enemies." Therefore, we cannot participate in war (Rom. 12:19), war activities, or compulsory training.

==== Pentecostal churches ====
Jay Beaman's thesis states that 13 of 21, or 62% of American Pentecostal groups formed by 1917 show evidence of being pacifist sometime in their history. Furthermore, Jay Beaman has shown in his thesis that there has been a shift away from pacifism in the American Pentecostal churches to more a style of military support and chaplaincy. The major organisation for Pentecostal Christians who believe in pacifism is the PCPF, the Pentecostal Charismatic Peace Fellowship.

The United Pentecostal Church, the largest Apostolic/Oneness denomination, takes an official stand of conscientious objection: its Articles of Faith read, "We are constrained to declare against participating in combatant service in war, armed insurrection ... aiding or abetting in or the actual destruction of human life. We believe that we can be consistent in serving our Government in certain noncombatant capacities, but not in the bearing of arms."

==== Other denominations ====
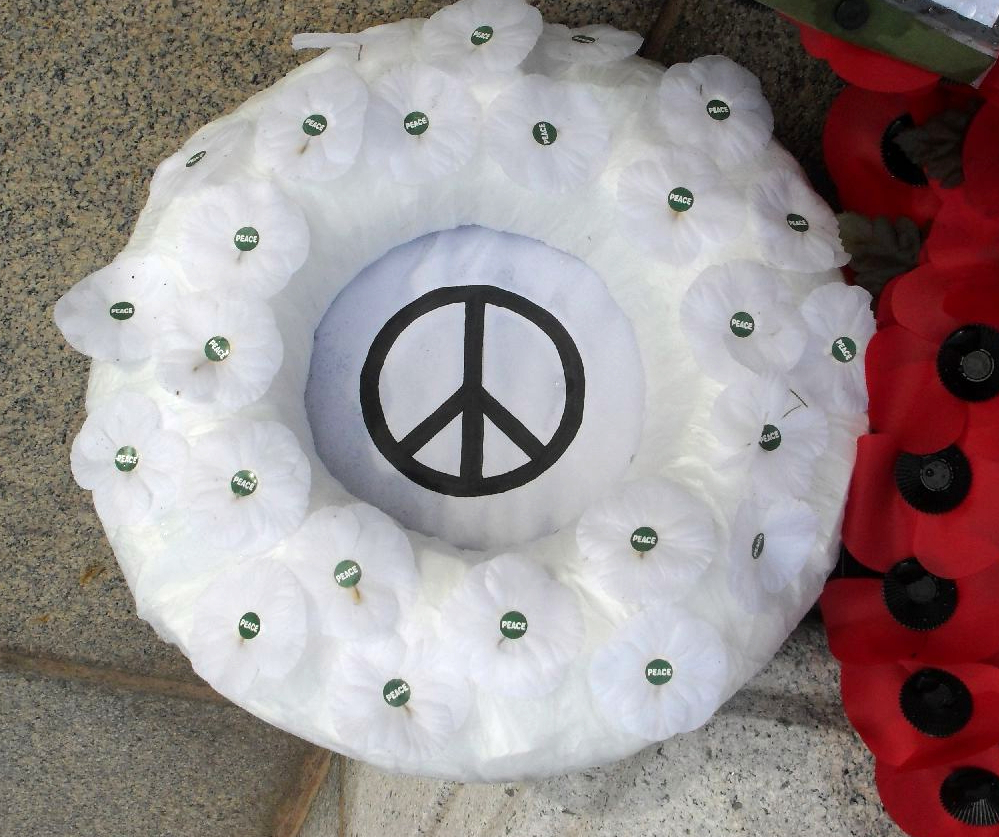
A Peace poppy wreath, made of Peace poppies, with a CND symbol inside at a British Remembrance Day event

The Peace Pledge Union is a pacifist organisation from which the Anglican Pacifist Fellowship (APF) later emerged within the Anglican Church. The APF succeeded in gaining ratification of the pacifist position at two successive Lambeth Conferences, but many Anglicans would not regard themselves as pacifists. South African Bishop Desmond Tutu is the most prominent Anglican pacifist. Rowan Williams led an almost united Anglican Church in Britain in opposition to the 2003 Iraq War. In Australia Peter Carnley similarly led a front of bishops opposed to the Government of Australia's involvement in the invasion of Iraq.

The Catholic Worker Movement is concerned with both social justice and pacifist issues, and voiced consistent opposition to the Spanish Civil War and World War II. Many of its early members were imprisoned for their opposition to conscription. Within the Roman Catholic Church, the Pax Christi organisation is the premier pacifist lobby group. It holds positions similar to APF, and the two organisations are known to work together on ecumenical projects. Within Roman Catholicism there has been a discernible move towards a more pacifist position through the twentieth and early twenty-first centuries. Popes Benedict XV, John XXIII and John Paul II were all vocal in their opposition to specific wars. By taking the name Benedict XVI, some suspected that Joseph Ratzinger would continue the strong emphasis upon nonviolent conflict resolution of his predecessor. However, the Roman Catholic Church officially maintains the legitimacy of Just War, which is rejected by some pacifists.

In the twentieth century, there was a notable trend among prominent Roman Catholics towards pacifism. Individuals such as Dorothy Day and Henri Nouwen stand out among them. The monk and mystic Thomas Merton was noted for his commitment to pacifism during the Vietnam War era. Murdered Salvadoran Bishop Óscar Romero was notable for using non-violent resistance tactics and wrote meditative sermons focusing on the power of prayer and peace. School of the Americas Watch was founded by Maryknoll Fr. Roy Bourgeois in 1990 and uses strictly pacifist principles to protest the training of Latin American military officers by United States Army officers at the School of the Americas in the state of Georgia.

The Southern Baptist Convention has stated in the Baptist Faith and Message, "It is the duty of Christians to seek peace with all men on principles of righteousness. In accordance with the spirit and teachings of Christ they should do all in their power to put an end to war."

The United Methodist Church explicitly supports conscientious objection by its members "as an ethically valid position" while simultaneously allowing for differences of opinion and belief for those who do not object to military service.

Members of the Rastafari Movement's Mansion Nyabinghi are specifically noted for having a large population of Pacifist members, though not all of them are.

=== Hinduism ===
Nonviolence, or ahimsa, is a central part of Hinduism and is one of the fundamental Yamas – self restraints needed to live a proper life. The concept of ahimsa grew gradually within Hinduism, one of the signs being the discouragement of ritual animal sacrifice. Many Hindus today have a vegetarian diet. The classical texts of Hinduism devote numerous chapters discussing what people who practice the virtue of Ahimsa, can and must do when they are faced with war, violent threat or need to sentence someone convicted of a crime. These discussions have led to theories of just war, theories of reasonable self-defence and theories of proportionate punishment. Arthashastra discusses, among other things, why and what constitutes proportionate response and punishment. The precepts of Ahimsa under Hinduism require that war must be avoided, with sincere and truthful dialogue. Force must be the last resort. If war becomes necessary, its cause must be just, its purpose virtuous, its objective to restrain the wicked, its aim peace, its method lawful. While the war is in progress, sincere dialogue for peace must continue.

=== Islam ===
Different Muslim movements through history had linked pacifism with Muslim theology. However, warfare has been integral part of Islamic history both for the defense and the spread of the faith since the time of Muhammad.

Peace is an important aspect of Islam, and Muslims are encouraged to strive for peace and to find peaceful solutions to all problems. However, most Muslims are not strict pacifists, as the teachings in the Qur'an and Hadith allow for wars to be fought if they are justified.

An example of non-violent civil disobedience was brought about by Egyptians against the British in the Egyptian Revolution of 1919.

==== Sufism ====
Prior to the Hijra travel, Muhammad struggled non-violently against his opposition in Mecca, providing a basis for Islamic pacifist schools of thought such as some Sufi orders.

In the 13th century, Salim Suwari, an Islamic scholar from West Africa, developed a philosophy known as the Suwarian tradition. Suwari focussed on the responsibilities of Muslims living in non-Muslim societies, and emphasised peaceful coexistence. The Suwarian tradition recognises the necessity of militant jihad as a last resort in self-defence; otherwise, it emphasises accommodationism and coexistence.

Khān Abdul Ghaffār Khān was a Pashtun independence activist against British colonial rule. He was a political and spiritual leader known for his nonviolent opposition, and a lifelong pacifist and devout Muslim. A close friend of Mahatma Gandhi, Bacha Khan was nicknamed the "Frontier Gandhi" in British India.

Bacha Khan founded the Khudai Khidmatgar ("Servants of God") movement in 1929, a nonviolent resistance organisation based on his ideology. It had widespread success across the Pashtun Frontier. The movement's campaign of civil disobedience was met with severe crackdowns by the colonial government (such as the Qissa Khwani Massacre and the Babrra Massacre), as well as from opposing groups in the Indian independence movement.

==== Ahmadiyya ====
According to the Ahmadiyya understanding of Islam, pacifism is a strong current, and jihad is one's personal inner struggle and should not be used violently for political motives. Violence is the last option only to be used to protect religion and one's own life in extreme situations of persecution. Mirza Ghulam Ahmad, the founder of the Ahmadiyya Muslim Community, said that in contrary to the current views, Islam does not allow the use of sword in religion, except in the case of defensive wars, wars waged to punish a tyrant, or those meant to uphold freedom.

Ahmadiyya claims its objective to be the peaceful propagation of Islam with special emphasis on spreading the true message of Islam by the pen. Ahmadis point out that as per prophecy, who they believe was the promised messiah, Mirza Ghulam Ahmad, rendered the concept of violent jihad unnecessary in modern times. They believe that the answer of hate should be given by love. Many Muslims consider Ahmadi Muslims as either kafirs or heretics, an animosity sometimes resulting in murder.

=== Jainism ===
Absolute Non-violence and compassion for all life is central to Jainism. Human life is valued as a unique, rare opportunity to reach enlightenment. Killing any person or living creature seen or unseen, no matter what crime may have committed, is considered unimaginably terrible. It is a religion that requires monks, from all its sects and traditions, to be lacto-vegetarianism. Most or all Jains are lacto-vegetarians. Some Indian regions, such as Gujarat, Madhya Pradesh have been strongly influenced by Jains and often the majority of the local Hindus of every denomination are also lacto-vegetarian.

=== Judaism ===
Although Judaism is not a pacifist religion, it does believe that peace is highly desirable. Most Jews will hope to limit or minimise conflict and violence but they accept that, given human nature and the situations which arise from time to time in the world, there will be occasions when violence and war may be justified. The Jewish Peace Fellowship is a New-York based nonprofit, nondenominational organization set up to provide a Jewish voice in the peace movement. The organization was founded in 1941 in order to support Jewish conscientious objectors who sought exemption from combatant military service. It is affiliated to the International Fellowship of Reconciliation. Neturei Karta, an anti-Zionist ultra-Orthodox Jewish group, state that "Jews are not allowed to dominate, kill, harm or demean another people and are not allowed to have anything to do with the Zionist enterprise, their political meddling and their wars." The Hebrew Bible has many examples of Jews being told to go and war against enemy lands or within the Israelite community as well as instances where God, as destroyer and protector, goes to war for non-participant Jews.

== Government and political movements ==
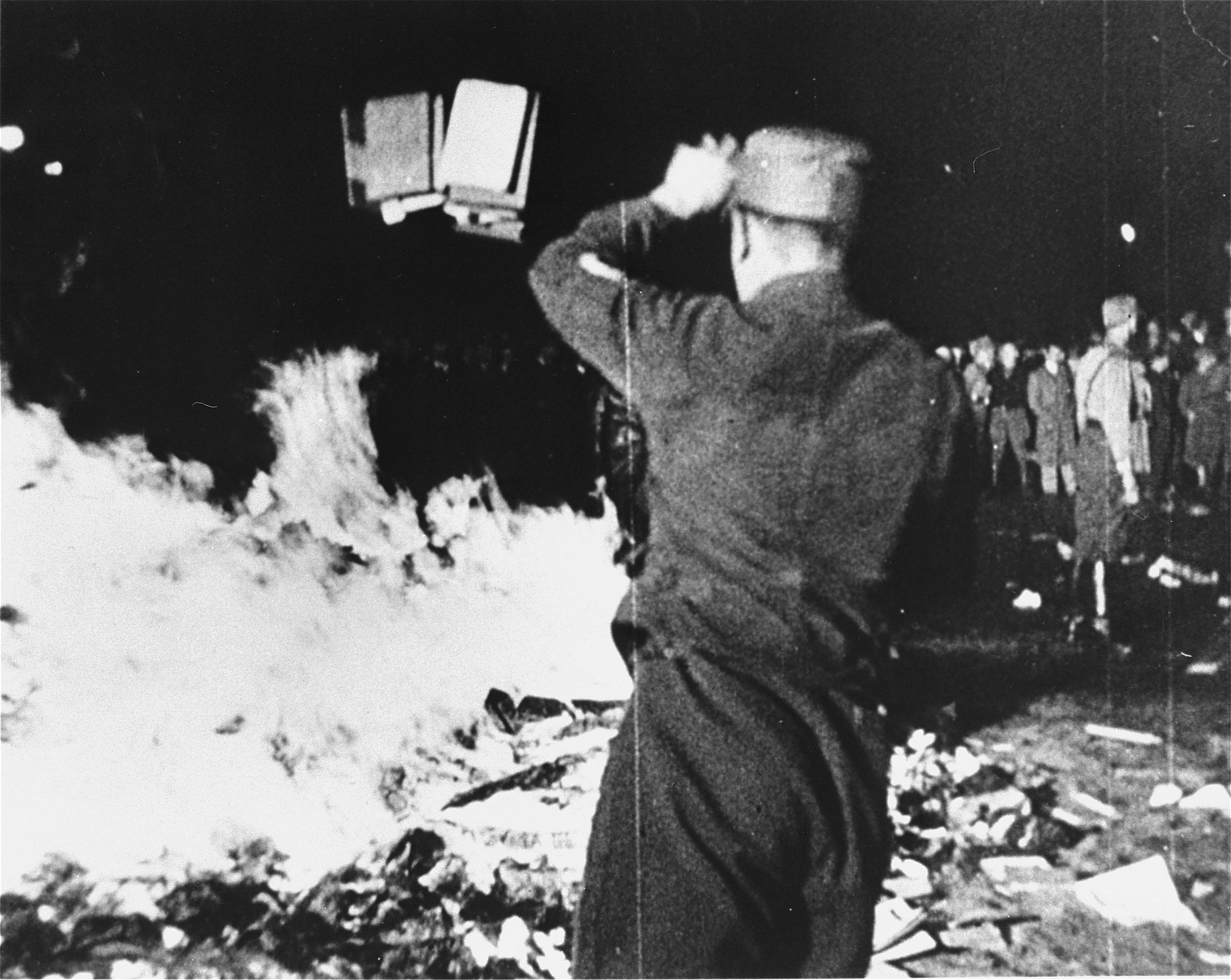
Remarque's anti-war novel All Quiet on the Western Front was banned and burned by war-glorifying Nazis.

While many governments have tolerated pacifist views and even accommodated pacifists' refusal to fight in wars, others at times have outlawed pacifist and anti-war activity. In 1918, The United States Congress passed the Sedition Act of 1918. During the periods between World Wars I and World War II, pacifist literature and public advocacy was banned in Italy under Benito Mussolini, Germany after the rise of Hitler, Spain under Francisco Franco, and the Soviet Union under Joseph Stalin. In these nations, pacifism was denounced as cowardice; indeed, Mussolini referred to pacifist writings as the "propaganda of cowardice".

Today, the United States requires that all young men register for selective service but does not allow them to be classified as conscientious objectors unless they are drafted in some future reinstatement of the draft, allowing them to be discharged or transferred to noncombatant status. Some European governments like Switzerland, Greece, Norway and Germany offer civilian service. However, even during periods of peace, many pacifists still refuse to register for or report for military duty, risking criminal charges.

Anti-war and "pacifist" political parties seeking to win elections may moderate their demands, calling for de-escalation or major arms reduction rather than the outright disarmament which is advocated by many pacifists. Green parties list "non-violence" and "decentralization" towards anarchist co-operatives or minimalist village government as two of their ten key values. However, in power, Greens often compromise. The German Greens in the cabinet of Social Democrat Gerhard Schröder supported an intervention by German troops in Afghanistan in 2001 if that they hosted the peace conference in Berlin. However, during the 2002 election Greens forced Schröder to swear that no German troops would invade Iraq.

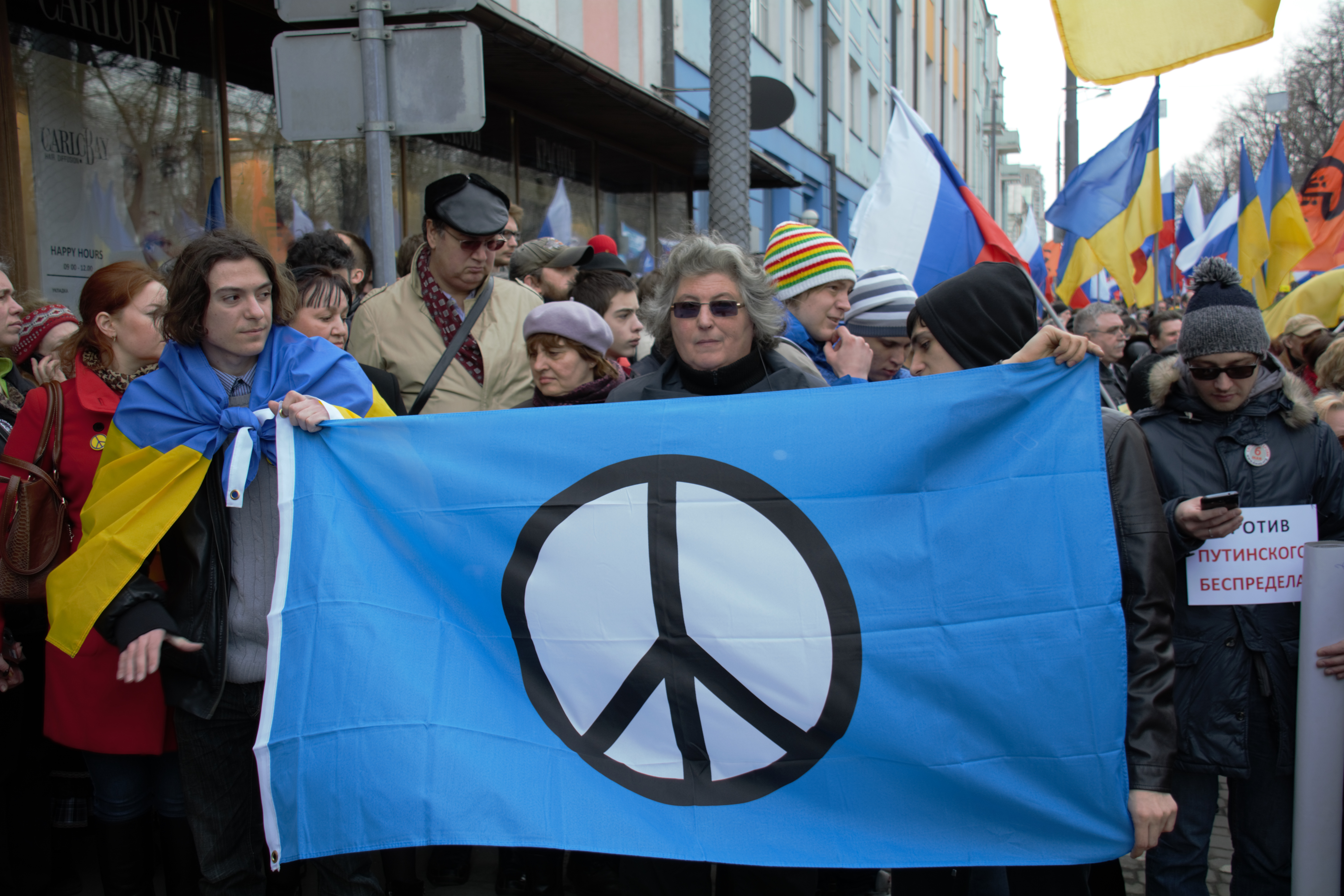
March of Peace, which took place in Moscow in March 2014

Some pacifists and multilateralists are in favor of international criminal law as means to prevent and control international aggression. The International Criminal Court has jurisdiction over war crimes, but the crime of aggression has yet to be clearly defined in international law.

The Italian Constitution enforces a mild pacifist character on the Italian Republic, as Article 11 states that "Italy repudiates war as an instrument offending the liberty of the peoples and as a means for settling international disputes". Similarly, Articles 24, 25 and 26 of the German Constitution (1949), Alinea 15 of the French Constitution (1946), Article 20 of the Danish Constitution (1953), Article 9 of the Japanese Constitution (1947) and several other mostly European constitutions correspond to the United Nations Charter by rejecting the institution of war in favour of collective security and peaceful cooperation.

=== Pacifism and abstention from political activity ===
However, some pacifists, such as the Christian anarchist Leo Tolstoy and autarchist Robert LeFevre, consider the state a form of warfare. In addition, for doctrinal reason that a manmade government is inferior to divine governance and law, many pacifist-identified religions/religious sects also refrain from political activity altogether, including the Anabaptists, Jehovah's Witnesses and Mandaeans. This means that such groups refuse to participate in government office or serve under an oath to a government.

=== Anarcho-pacifism ===
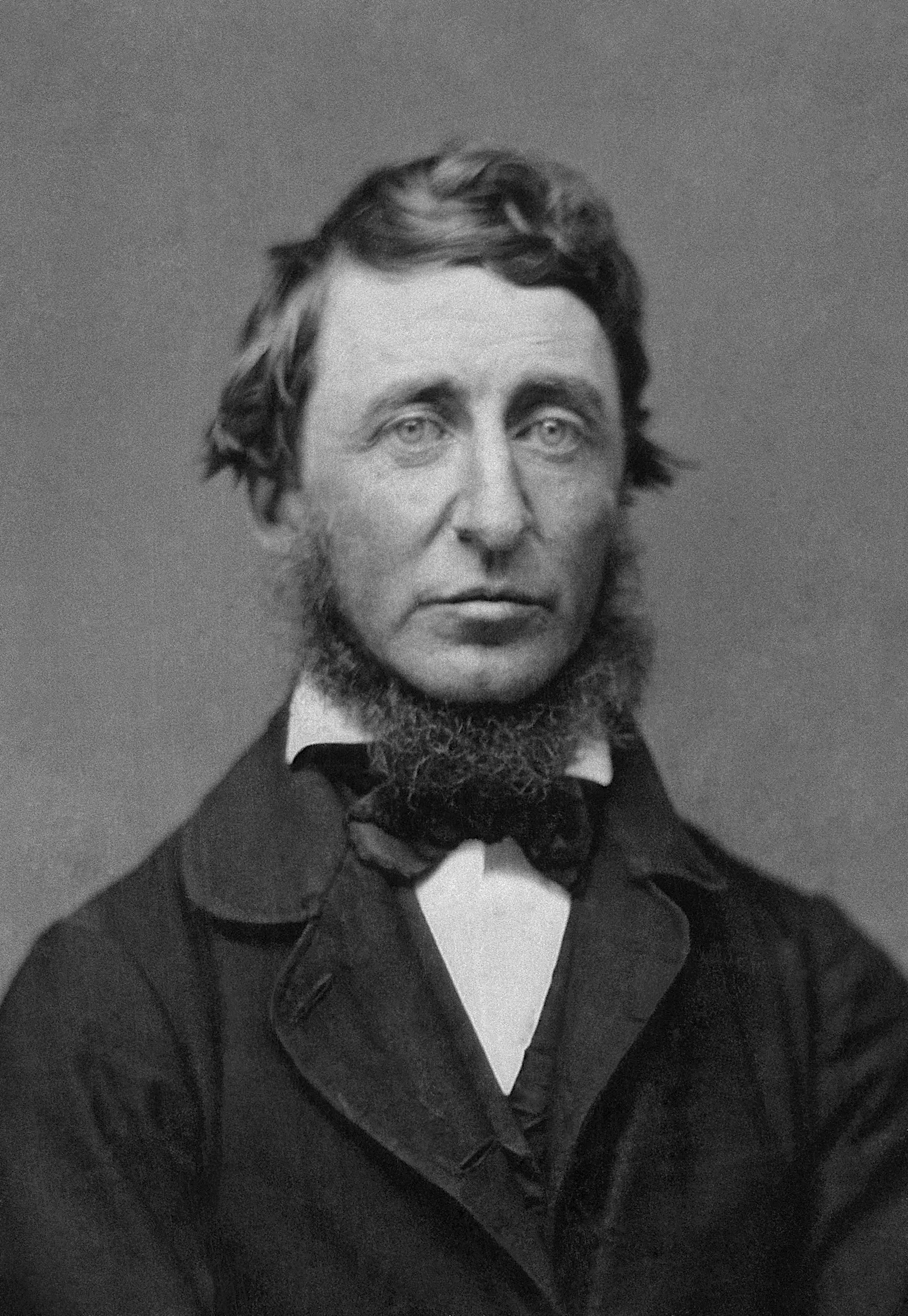
Henry David Thoreau, early proponent of anarcho-pacifism

Anarcho-pacifism is a form of anarchism which completely rejects the use of violence in any form for any purpose. The main precedent was Henry David Thoreau who through his work Civil Disobedience influenced the advocacy of both Leo Tolstoy and Mahatma Gandhi for nonviolent resistance. As a global movement, anarcho-pacifism emerged shortly before World War II in the Netherlands, Great Britain and the United States and was a strong presence in the subsequent campaigns for nuclear disarmament.

Violence has always been controversial in anarchism. While many anarchists during the 19th century embraced propaganda of the deed, Leo Tolstoy and other anarcho-pacifists directly opposed violence as a means for change. He argued that anarchism must by nature be nonviolent since it is, by definition, opposition to coercion and force and since the state is inherently violent, meaningful pacifism must likewise be anarchistic. His philosophy was cited as a major inspiration by Mahatma Gandhi, an Indian independence leader and pacifist who self-identified as an anarchist. Ferdinand Domela Nieuwenhuis was also instrumental in establishing the pacifist trend within the anarchist movement. In France, anti-militarism appeared strongly in individualist anarchist circles as Émile Armand founded "Ligue Antimilitariste" in 1902 with Albert Libertad and George Mathias Paraf-Javal.

=== Opposition to military taxation ===
Many pacifists who would be conscientious objectors to military service are also opposed to paying taxes to fund the military. In the United States, the National Campaign for a Peace Tax Fund works to pass a national law to allow conscientious objectors to redirect their tax money to be used only for non-military purposes.

== Criticism ==
Those who ‘abjure’ violence can only do so because others are committing violence on their behalf.

— Notes on Nationalism (George Orwell, 1945)

One common argument against pacifism is the possibility of using violence to prevent further acts of violence (and reduce the "net-sum" of violence). This argument hinges on consequentialism: an otherwise morally objectionable action can be justified if it results in a positive outcome. For example, either violent rebellion, or foreign nations sending in troops to end a dictator's violent oppression may save millions of lives, even if many thousands died in the war. Those pacifists who base their beliefs on deontological grounds would oppose such violent action. Others would oppose organized military responses but support individual and small group self-defense against specific attacks if initiated by the dictator's forces. Pacifists may argue that military action could be justified should it subsequently advance the general cause of peace.

Still more pacifists would argue that a nonviolent reaction may not save lives immediately but would in the long run. The acceptance of violence for any reason makes it easier to use in other situations. Learning and committing to pacifism helps to send a message that violence is, in fact, not the most effective way. It can also help people to think more creatively and find more effective ways to stop violence without more violence.

In light of the common criticism of pacifism as not offering a clear alternative policy, one approach to finding "more effective ways" has been the attempt to develop the idea of "defence by civil resistance", also called "social defence". This idea, which is not necessarily dependent on acceptance of pacifist beliefs, is based on relying on nonviolent resistance against possible threats, whether external (such as invasion) or internal (such as coup d'état).

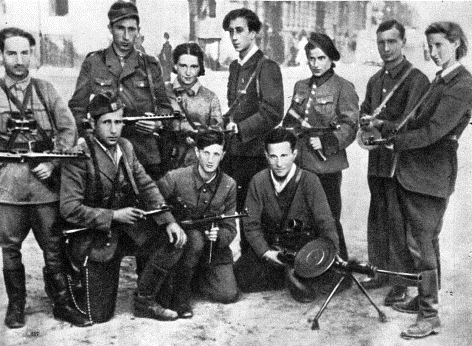
Jewish armed resistance against the Nazis during World War II

There have been some works on this topic, including by Adam Roberts and Gene Sharp. However, no country has adopted this approach as the sole basis of its defence. (For further information and sources see social defence.)

Axis aggression that precipitated World War II has been cited as an argument against pacifism. If these forces had not been challenged and defeated militarily, the argument goes, many more people would have died under their oppressive rule. Hitler told the British Foreign Secretary Lord Halifax in 1937 that the British should "shoot Gandhi, and if that does not suffice to reduce them to submission, shoot a dozen leading members of Congress; and if that does not suffice, shoot 200 and so on until order is established. You will see how quickly they will collapse as soon as you make it clear that you mean business."

Hitler noted in his Second Book: "... Later, the attempt to adapt the living space to increased population turned into unmotivated wars of conquest, which in their very lack of motivation contained the germ of the subsequent reaction. Pacifism is the answer to it. Pacifism has existed in the world ever since there have been wars whose meaning no longer lay in the conquest of territory for a Folk's sustenance. Since then it has been war's eternal companion. It will again disappear as soon as war ceases to be an instrument of booty hungry or power hungry individuals or nations, and as soon as it again becomes the ultimate weapon with which a Folk fights for its daily bread."

Hermann Göring described, during an interview at the Nuremberg Trials, how denouncing and outlawing pacifism was an important part of the Nazis' seizure of power: "The people can always be brought to the bidding of the leaders. That is easy. All you have to do is tell them they are being attacked and denounce the pacifists for lack of patriotism and exposing the country to danger. It works the same way in any country."

In his 1945 essay Notes on Nationalism, George Orwell characterised pacifism as a form of nationalism and claimed most pacifists "either belong to obscure religious sects or are simply humanitarians who object to the taking of life and prefer not to follow their thoughts beyond that point." Orwell also identified a small group of pacifist intellectuals "whose real though unadmitted motive appears to be hatred of western democracy and admiration of totalitarianism." He noted that the propaganda produced by British pacifists, though superficially condemning violence by all sides, focused their criticism entirely on Western nations and refrained from criticising violence by non-Western actors. Orwell further wrote:

Pacifist literature abounds with equivocal remarks which, if they mean anything, appear to mean that statesmen of the type of Hitler are preferable to those of the type of Churchill, and that violence is perhaps excusable if it is violent enough. After the fall of France, the French pacifists, faced by a real choice which their English colleagues have not had to make, mostly went over to the Nazis, and in England there appears to have been some small overlap of membership between the Peace Pledge Union and the Blackshirts. Pacifist writers have written in praise of Carlyle, one of the intellectual fathers of Fascism. All in all it is difficult not to feel that pacifism, as it appears among a section of the intelligentsia, is secretly inspired by an admiration for power and successful cruelty.

Some commentators on the most nonviolent forms of pacifism, including Jan Narveson, argue that such pacifism is a self-contradictory doctrine. Narveson claims that everyone has rights and corresponding responsibilities not to violate others' rights. Since pacifists give up their ability to protect themselves from violation of their right not to be harmed, then other people thus have no corresponding responsibility, thus creating a paradox of rights. Narveson said that "the prevention of infractions of that right is precisely what one has a right to when one has a right at all." Narveson then discusses how rational persuasion is a good but often inadequate method of discouraging an aggressor. He considers that everyone has the right to use any means necessary to prevent deprivation of their civil liberties, and force could be necessary. Peter Gelderloos criticizes the idea that nonviolence is the only way to fight for a better world. According to Gelderloos, pacifism as an ideology serves the interests of the state and is hopelessly caught up psychologically with the control schema of patriarchy and white supremacy. Anne Appelbaum has argued that advocating pacifism in response to the Russo-Ukrainian War overlooks the lessons of history, as surrendering territory and principles enables atrocities, and early military support for Ukraine might have deterred the invasion, revealing that misguided pacifism can sometimes lead to greater conflict.

== See also ==
- List of peace activists with their own Wikipedia article
- Antimilitarism
- Anti-war movement
- Aparigraha
- Catholic peace traditions
- Christian Peacemaker Teams
- Counter-recruitment
- Criticism of the war on terror
- Defencism
- Demilitarisation
- Die-in
- Hélder Câmara
- Non-aggression principle
- Nonkilling
- Opposition to the Iraq War
- Opposition to the U.S. involvement in the Vietnam War
- Pacifist Socialist Party
- Pacifism in the United States
- Peace and conflict studies
- Peace camp
- Peace education
- Peace journalism
- Protests against the Iraq War
- Rule according to higher law
- Soldiers are murderers
- Third Party Non-violent Intervention
