= Paradoxes of the Infinite =

Posthumous 1851 treatise by Bernard Bolzano on mathematical infinity

- Editor: František Přihonský
- Author: Bernard Bolzano
- Original title: 'Paradoxien des Unendlichen'
- Translator: Donald A. Steele (English translation, 1950)
- Language: German
- Subject: Infinity, foundations of mathematics, early set theory, philosophy of mathematics
- Publisher: C. H. Reclam
- Publication date: 1851
- Publication place: Kingdom of Saxony (published in Leipzig)

Paradoxes of the Infinite (German: Paradoxien des Unendlichen) is a posthumously published treatise by the Bohemian philosopher, theologian and mathematician Bernard Bolzano (1781–1848). Edited by his former student František Přihonský and published in Leipzig in 1851, the book surveys “paradoxes” connected with the infinite in mathematics, geometry, physics and metaphysics, with the aim of showing that such paradoxes are not genuine contradictions once the relevant concepts are made precise. The work is often discussed in the prehistory of set theory for its detailed defence of actual (completed) infinity and its analysis of one-to-one pairings between infinite “multitudes” and their parts, themes later central to Dedekind’s and Cantor’s work on infinite collections.

== Background and publication ==
According to Přihonský’s editor’s preface, Bolzano began writing the book in 1847 while staying with the editor in Liboch (near Mělník) and completed it in the summer of 1848, the final year of his life. After receiving the manuscript from Bolzano’s heirs, Přihonský prepared it for publication by correcting passages, improving legibility, and supplying a detailed synopsis of contents; he dated his preface from Bautzen (Budissin) on 10 July 1850 and chose Leipzig partly for wider distribution. The first edition appeared in 1851 with the Leipzig publisher C. H. Reclam.

== Overview and structure ==
The work is organised into 70 numbered sections. A synopsis supplied by the editor indicates the book’s main arc:

- §§1–19: competing conceptions of the infinite in mathematics and philosophy; the “objectivity” of the relevant concepts; and examples intended to motivate the existence of infinite multitudes (e.g., truths, numbers, quantities, and the divisibility of time and space).
- §§20–23: the “noteworthy relation” of pairing members of two infinite multitudes so that nothing remains unpaired (a one-to-one correspondence), and the resulting tension between equinumerosity and the part–whole intuition.
- §§24–37: “calculation with the infinite,” including discussion of the infinitely great and infinitely small, restrictions on the use of zero, and conditions under which infinite sums may be treated as equal.
- §§38–49: paradoxes tied to the continuum, and to time and space, including critical discussion of claims involving infinite magnitude or infinitesimal parts; examples include questions about infinite curvature and other “paradoxical relationships” of spatial extensions.
- §§50–70: paradoxes in physics and metaphysics, including arguments about individuation (e.g., denial that there are two “altogether equal” things) and related consequences for atomism and the structure of the physical world.

== Key themes ==
=== Actual infinity and the “harmlessness” of paradox ===
Bolzano’s stated project is to treat paradoxes surrounding infinity as apparent rather than real contradictions. In later historical discussion, this is often described as a systematic defence of actual infinity within mathematics, combined with an attempt to clarify which principles of finite reasoning fail (or require modification) in infinite contexts.

=== Collections, multitudes, and terminology ===
Bolzano distinguishes several kinds of “collections” in the opening portions of the treatise, separating the general idea of a collection (Inbegriff) from the special case of a multitude (Menge) in which the arrangement of parts is treated as irrelevant. Modern commentators often translate Menge as “multitude” to avoid importing later Cantorian assumptions into Bolzano’s framework.

=== One-to-one correspondence and the part–whole tension ===
A central portion of the book analyses the possibility of pairing elements of two infinite multitudes so that each element of either multitude occurs in exactly one pair (what later mathematics calls a bijection). Bolzano notes that such a pairing can hold even when one multitude is (in an intuitive part–whole sense) contained in the other, and he argues that—unlike the finite case—pairing alone is not always sufficient to conclude “equality in respect of plurality.” He therefore appeals to additional conditions (often glossed as “determining grounds” or a shared “way of being formed”) to justify claims of equality or ratio for infinite multitudes in specific cases.

This stance is frequently contrasted with later nineteenth-century set theory, in which Dedekind and Cantor elevated one-to-one correspondence to a primary criterion for comparing sizes of infinite collections.

=== Infinite quantities and infinite sums ===
In the sections dealing with “calculation with the infinite,” Bolzano rejects a number of informal uses of infinitesimals and infinite magnitudes (including treating division by zero as meaningful), and attempts to state constraints under which operations involving infinitely small or large quantities can be made consistent. Recent scholarship has re-examined these parts of the book, arguing that Bolzano’s mature views are best understood not as a precursor of Cantorian cardinal arithmetic but as a theory of infinite sums with its own algebraic structure.

== Reception and influence ==
Bolzano’s book was published posthumously and (by some accounts) had limited immediate impact on the subsequent development of mathematics. Nevertheless, later writers in the history of logic and set theory have highlighted its role as an early, sustained attempt to analyse infinite collections and the principles governing their comparison. In particular, Encyclopædia Britannica notes that Dedekind and Cantor made explicit use of one-to-one mappings as a tool for “measuring” sets, and that Dedekind formulated a definition of an infinite set in terms of correspondence with a proper part—an idea closely related to the correspondences treated in Paradoxien des Unendlichen.

The book has also attracted attention in mathematics education and philosophy of mathematics as a historically rich source of arguments and examples about infinity, especially where intuitive part–whole reasoning conflicts with correspondence-based comparison.

== Editions and translations ==
- Paradoxien des Unendlichen (Leipzig: C. H. Reclam, 1851), edited by František Přihonský.
- Paradoxes of the Infinite (London: Routledge & Kegan Paul, 1950), translated from the posthumous edition and furnished with a historical introduction by Donald A. Steele, S.J.
- Routledge reprint (Routledge Revivals, 2014).
- English translation included in: Steve Russ (ed.), The Mathematical Works of Bernard Bolzano (Oxford: Oxford University Press, 2004).

== See also ==
- Galileo's paradox
- Dedekind-infinite set
- Cardinality
- Actual infinity
