= Bernard Bolzano =

Bohemian polymath (1781–1848)

The Reverend Bernard Bolzano
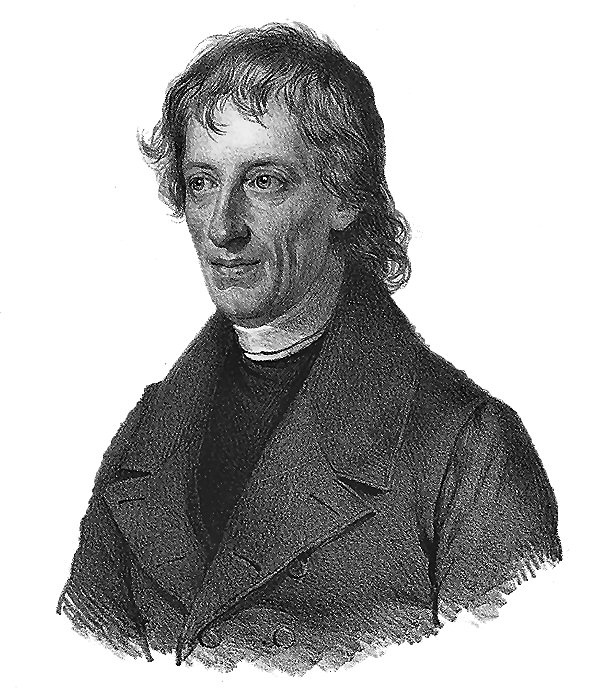
- Born: Bernardus Placidus Johann Nepomuk Bolzano; 5 October 1781; Prague, Bohemia, Holy Roman Empire
- Died: 18 December 1848 (aged 67); Prague, Bohemia, Austrian Empire

Education
- Education: University of Prague (PhD, 1804)
- Thesis: Betrachtungen über einige Gegenstände der Elementargeometrie (Considerations on Some Objects of Elementary Geometry) (1804)
- Academic advisor: Franz Josef Gerstner

Philosophical work
- Era: Modern philosophy: 19th-century philosophy
- Region: Western philosophy: Czech philosophy; German philosophy
- School: Logical realism Utilitarianism; Social liberalism
- Institutions: University of Prague (1805–1819)
- Notable students: Robert von Zimmermann
- Main interests: Logic, epistemology, theology
- Notable ideas: Logical realism Bolzano's theorem (the first purely analytic proof of the intermediate value theorem); Bolzano–Weierstrass theorem (ε, δ)-definition of limit Least-upper-bound property

Ecclesiastical career
- Religion: Christianity
- Church: Catholic Church
- Ordained: 1805

Bernard Bolzano (UK: /bɒlˈtsɑːnoʊ/, US: /boʊltˈsɑː-, boʊlˈzɑː-/; German: [bɔlˈtsaːno]; Italian: [bolˈtsaːno]; born Bernardus Placidus Johann Nepomuk Bolzano; 5 October 1781 – 18 December 1848) was a Bohemian mathematician, logician, philosopher, theologian and Catholic priest of Italian extraction, also known for his liberal views.

Bolzano wrote in German, his native language. For the most part, his work came to prominence posthumously.

== Family ==
Bolzano was the son of two pious Catholics. His father, Bernard Pompeius Bolzano, was an Italian who had moved to Prague, where he married Maria Cecilia Maurer who came from Prague's German-speaking family Maurer. Only two of their twelve children lived to adulthood.

== Career ==
When he was ten years old, Bolzano entered the Gymnasium of the Piarists in Prague, which he attended from 1791 to 1796.

Bolzano entered the University of Prague in 1796 and studied mathematics, philosophy and physics. Starting in 1800, he also began studying theology, becoming a Catholic priest in 1804. He was appointed to the new chair of philosophy of religion at Prague University in 1805. He proved to be a popular lecturer not only in religion but also in philosophy, and he was elected Dean of the Philosophical Faculty in 1818.

Bolzano alienated many faculty and church leaders with his teachings of the social waste of militarism and the needlessness of war. He urged a total reform of the educational, social and economic systems that would direct the nation's interests toward peace rather than toward armed conflict between nations. His political convictions, which he was inclined to share with others with some frequency, eventually proved to be too liberal for the Austrian authorities. On 24 December 1819, he was removed from his professorship (upon his refusal to recant his beliefs) and was exiled to the countryside and then devoted his energies to his writings on social, religious, philosophical, and mathematical matters.

Although forbidden to publish in mainstream journals as a condition of his exile, Bolzano continued to develop his ideas and publish them either on his own or in obscure Eastern European journals. In 1842 he moved back to Prague, where he died in 1848.

== Mathematical work ==
Bolzano made several original contributions to mathematics. His overall philosophical stance was that, contrary to much of the prevailing mathematics of the era, it was better not to introduce intuitive ideas such as time and motion into mathematics. To this end, he was one of the earliest mathematicians to begin instilling rigor into mathematical analysis with his three chief mathematical works Beyträge zu einer begründeteren Darstellung der Mathematik (1810), Der binomische Lehrsatz (1816) and Rein analytischer Beweis (1817). These works presented "...a sample of a new way of developing analysis", whose ultimate goal would not be realized until some fifty years later when they came to the attention of Karl Weierstrass.

To the foundations of mathematical analysis he contributed the introduction of a fully rigorous ε–δ definition of a mathematical limit. Bolzano was the first to recognize the greatest lower bound property of the real numbers. Like several others of his day, he was skeptical of the possibility of Gottfried Leibniz's infinitesimals, that had been the earliest putative foundation for differential calculus. Bolzano's notion of a limit was similar to the modern one: that a limit, rather than being a relation among infinitesimals, must instead be cast in terms of how the dependent variable approaches a definite quantity as the independent variable approaches some other definite quantity.

Bolzano also gave the first purely analytic proof of the fundamental theorem of algebra, which had originally been proven by Gauss from geometrical considerations. He also gave the first purely analytic proof of the intermediate value theorem (also known as Bolzano's theorem). Today he is mostly remembered for the Bolzano–Weierstrass theorem, which Karl Weierstrass developed independently and published years after Bolzano's first proof and which was initially called the Weierstrass theorem until Bolzano's earlier work was rediscovered.

== Philosophical work ==
Bolzano's posthumously published work Paradoxien des Unendlichen (The Paradoxes of the Infinite) (1851) was greatly admired by many of the eminent logicians who came after him, including Charles Sanders Peirce, Georg Cantor, and Richard Dedekind. Bolzano's main claim to fame, however, is his 1837 Wissenschaftslehre (Theory of Science), a work in four volumes that covered not only philosophy of science in the modern sense but also logic, epistemology and scientific pedagogy. The logical theory that Bolzano developed in this work has come to be acknowledged as ground-breaking. Other works are a four-volume Lehrbuch der Religionswissenschaft (Textbook of the Science of Religion) and the metaphysical work Athanasia, a defense of the immortality of the soul. Bolzano also did valuable work in mathematics, which remained virtually unknown until Otto Stolz rediscovered many of his lost journal articles and republished them in 1881.

=== Wissenschaftslehre (Theory of Science) ===
In his 1837 Wissenschaftslehre Bolzano attempted to provide logical foundations for all sciences, building on abstractions like part-relation, abstract objects, attributes, sentence-shapes, ideas and propositions in themselves, sums and sets, collections, substances, adherences, subjective ideas, judgments, and sentence-occurrences. These attempts were an extension of his earlier thoughts in the philosophy of mathematics, for example his 1810 Beiträge where he emphasized the distinction between the objective relationship between logical consequences and our subjective recognition of these connections. For Bolzano, it was not enough that we merely have confirmation of natural or mathematical truths, but rather it was the proper role of the sciences (both pure and applied) to seek out justification in terms of the fundamental truths that may or may not appear to be obvious to our intuitions.

==== Introduction to Wissenschaftslehre ====
Bolzano begins his work by explaining what he means by theory of science, and the relation between our knowledge, truths and sciences. Human knowledge, he states, is made of all truths (or true propositions) that men know or have known. However, this is a very small fraction of all the truths that exist, although still too much for one human being to comprehend. Therefore, our knowledge is divided into more accessible parts. Such a collection of truths is what Bolzano calls a science (Wissenschaft). Not all true propositions of a science have to be known to men; hence, this is how we can make discoveries in a science.

To better understand and comprehend the truths of a science, men have created textbooks (Lehrbuch), which of course contain only the true propositions of the science known to men. But how to know where to divide our knowledge, that is, which truths belong together? Bolzano explains that we will ultimately know this through some reflection, but that the resulting rules of how to divide our knowledge into sciences will be a science in itself. This science, that tells us which truths belong together and should be explained in a textbook, is the Theory of Science (Wissenschaftslehre).

==== Metaphysics ====
In the Wissenschaftslehre, Bolzano is mainly concerned with three realms:

(1) The realm of language, consisting in words and sentences.
(2) The realm of thought, consisting in subjective ideas and judgements.
(3) The realm of logic, consisting in objective ideas (or ideas in themselves) and propositions in themselves.

Bolzano devotes a great part of the Wissenschaftslehre to an explanation of these realms and their relations.

Two distinctions play a prominent role in his system. First, the distinction between parts and wholes. For instance, words are parts of sentences, subjective ideas are parts of judgments, objective ideas are parts of propositions in themselves. Second, all objects divide into those that exist, which means that they are causally connected and located in time and/or space, and those that do not exist. Bolzano's original claim is that the logical realm is populated by objects of the latter kind.

==== Satz an Sich (proposition in itself) ====
Satz an Sich is a basic notion in Bolzano's Wissenschaftslehre. It is introduced at the very beginning, in section 19. Bolzano first introduces the notions of proposition (spoken or written or thought or in itself) and idea (spoken or written or thought or in itself). "The grass is green" is a proposition (Satz): in this connection of words, something is said or asserted. "Grass", however, is only an idea (Vorstellung). Something is represented by it, but it does not assert anything. Bolzano's notion of proposition is fairly broad: "A rectangle is round" is a proposition — even though it is false by virtue of self-contradiction — because it is composed in an intelligible manner out of intelligible parts.

Bolzano does not give a complete definition of a Satz an Sich (i.e. proposition in itself) but he gives us just enough information to understand what he means by it. A proposition in itself (i) has no existence (that is: it has no position in time or place), (ii) is either true or false, independent of anyone knowing or thinking that it is true or false, and (iii) is what is 'grasped' by thinking beings. So a written sentence ('Socrates has wisdom') grasps a proposition in itself, namely the proposition [Socrates has wisdom]. The written sentence does have existence (it has a certain location at a certain time, say it is on your computer screen at this very moment) and expresses the proposition in itself which is in the realm of in itself (i.e. an sich). (Bolzano's use of the term an sich differs greatly from that of Kant; for Kant's use of the term see an sich.)

Every proposition in itself is composed out of ideas in themselves (for simplicity, we will use proposition to mean "proposition in itself" and idea to refer to an objective idea or idea in itself). Ideas are negatively defined as those parts of a proposition that are themselves not propositions. A proposition consists of at least three ideas, namely: a subject idea, a predicate idea and the copula (i.e. 'has', or another form of to have). (Though there are propositions which contain propositions, we won't take them into consideration right now.)

Bolzano identifies certain types of ideas. There are simple ideas that have no parts (as an example Bolzano uses [something]), but there are also complex ideas that consist of other ideas (Bolzano uses the example of [nothing], which consists of the ideas [not] and [something]). Complex ideas can have the same content (i.e. the same parts) without being the same — because their components are differently connected. The idea [A black pen with blue ink] is different from the idea [A blue pen with black ink] though the parts of both ideas are the same.

==== Ideas and objects ====
It is important to understand that an idea does not need to have an object. Bolzano uses object to denote something that is represented by an idea. An idea that has an object, represents that object. But an idea that does not have an object represents nothing. (Don't get confused here by terminology: an objectless idea is an idea without a representation.)

Consider, for further explanation, an example used by Bolzano. The idea [a round square], does not have an object, because the object that ought to be represented is self-contradictory. A different example is the idea [nothing] which certainly does not have an object. However, the proposition [the idea of a round square has complexity] has as its subject-idea [the idea of a round square]. This subject-idea does have an object, namely the idea [a round square]. But, that idea does not have an object.

Besides objectless ideas, there are ideas that have only one object, e.g. the idea [the first man on the moon] represents only one object. Bolzano calls these ideas 'singular ideas'. Obviously there are also ideas that have many objects (e.g. [the citizens of Amsterdam]) and even infinitely many objects (e.g. [a prime number]).

==== Sensation and simple ideas ====
Bolzano has a complex theory of how we are able to sense things. He explains sensation by means of the term intuition, in German called Anschauung. An intuition is a simple idea, it has only one object (Einzelvorstellung), but besides that, it is also unique (Bolzano needs this to explain sensation). Intuitions (Anschauungen) are objective ideas, they belong to the an sich realm, which means that they don't have existence. As said, Bolzano's argumentation for intuitions is by an explanation of sensation.

What happens when you sense a real existing object, for instance a rose, is this: the different aspects of the rose, like its scent and its color, cause in you a change. That change means that before and after sensing the rose, your mind is in a different state. So sensation is in fact a change in your mental state. How is this related to objects and ideas? Bolzano explains that this change, in your mind, is essentially a simple idea (Vorstellung), like, 'this smell' (of this particular rose). This idea represents; it has as its object the change. Besides being simple, this change must also be unique. This is because literally you can't have the same experience twice, nor can two people, who smell the same rose at the same time, have exactly the same experience of that smell (although they will be quite alike). So each single sensation causes a single (new) unique and simple idea with a particular change as its object. Now, this idea in your mind is a subjective idea, meaning that it is in you at a particular time. It has existence. But this subjective idea must correspond to, or has as a content, an objective idea. This is where Bolzano brings in intuitions (Anschauungen); they are the simple, unique and objective ideas that correspond to our subjective ideas of changes caused by sensation. So for each single possible sensation, there is a corresponding objective idea. Schematically the whole process is like this: whenever you smell a rose, its scent causes a change in you. This change is the object of your subjective idea of that particular smell. That subjective idea corresponds to the intuition or Anschauung.

==== Logic ====
According to Bolzano, all propositions are composed out of three (simple or complex) elements: a subject, a predicate and a copula. Instead of the more traditional copulative term 'is', Bolzano prefers 'has'. The reason for this is that 'has', unlike 'is', can connect a concrete term, such as 'Socrates', to an abstract term such as 'baldness'. "Socrates has baldness" is, according to Bolzano, preferable to "Socrates is bald" because the latter form is less basic: 'bald' is itself composed of the elements 'something', 'that', 'has' and 'baldness'. Bolzano also reduces existential propositions to this form: "Socrates exists" would simply become "Socrates has existence (Dasein)".

A major role in Bolzano's logical theory is played by the notion of variations: various logical relations are defined in terms of the changes in truth value that propositions incur when their non-logical parts are replaced by others. Logically analytical propositions, for instance, are those in which all the non-logical parts can be replaced without change of truth value. Two propositions are 'compatible' (verträglich) with respect to one of their component parts x if there is at least one term that can be inserted that would make both true. A proposition Q is 'deducible' (ableitbar) from a proposition P, with respect to certain of their non-logical parts, if any replacement of those parts that makes P true also makes Q true. If a proposition is deducible from another with respect to all its non-logical parts, it is said to be 'logically deducible'. Besides the relation of deducibility, Bolzano also has a stricter relation of 'grounding' (Abfolge). This is an asymmetric relation that obtains between true propositions, when one of the propositions is not only deducible from, but also explained by the other.

==== Truth ====
Bolzano distinguishes five meanings the words true and truth have in common usage, all of which Bolzano takes to be unproblematic. The meanings are listed in order of properness:

I. Abstract objective meaning: Truth signifies an attribute that may apply to a proposition, primarily to a proposition in itself, namely the attribute on the basis of which the proposition expresses something that in reality is as is expressed. Antonyms: falsity, falseness, falsehood.

II. Concrete objective meaning: (a) Truth signifies a proposition that has the attribute truth in the abstract objective meaning. Antonym: (a) falsehood.

III. Subjective meaning: (a) Truth signifies a correct judgment. Antonym: (a) mistake.

IV. Collective meaning: Truth signifies a body or multiplicity true propositions or judgments (e.g. the biblical truth).

V. Improper meaning: True signifies that some object is in reality what some denomination states it to be. (e.g. the true God). Antonyms: false, unreal, illusory.

Bolzano's primary concern is with the concrete objective meaning: with concrete objective truths or truths in themselves. All truths in themselves are a kind of propositions in themselves. They do not exist, i.e. they are not spatiotemporally located as thought and spoken propositions are. However, certain propositions have the attribute of being a truth in itself. Being a thought proposition is not a part of the concept of a truth in itself, notwithstanding the fact that, given God's omniscience, all truths in themselves are also thought truths. The concepts 'truth in itself' and 'thought truth' are interchangeable, as they apply to the same objects, but they are not identical.

Bolzano offers as the correct definition of (abstract objective) truth: a proposition is true if it expresses something that applies to its object. The correct definition of a (concrete objective) truth must thus be: a truth is a proposition that expresses something that applies to its object. This definition applies to truths in themselves, rather than to thought or known truths, as none of the concepts figuring in this definition are subordinate to a concept of something mental or known.

Bolzano proves in §§31–32 of his Wissenschaftslehre three things:

There is at least one truth in itself (concrete objective meaning):

1. There are no true propositions (assumption)
2. 1. is a proposition (obvious)
3. 1. is true (assumed) and false (because of 1.)
4. 1. is self-contradictory (because of 3.)
5. 1. is false (because of 4.)
6. There is at least one true proposition (because of 1. and 5.)

B. There is more than one truth in itself:

7. There is only one truth in itself, namely A is B (assumption)
8. A is B is a truth in itself (because of 7.)
9. There are no other truths in themselves apart from A is B (because of 7.)
10. 9. is a true proposition/ a truth in itself (because of 7.)
11. There are two truths in themselves (because of 8. and 10.)
12. There is more than one truth in itself (because of 11.)

C. There are infinitely many truths in themselves:

13. There are only n truths in themselves, namely A is B .... Y is Z (assumption)
14. A is B .... Y is Z are n truths in themselves (because of 13.)
15. There are no other truths apart from A is B .... Y is Z (because of 13.)
16. 15. is a true proposition/ a truth in itself (because of 13.)
17. There are n+1 truths in themselves (because of 14. and 16.)
18. Steps 1 to 5 can be repeated for n+1, which results in n+2 truths and so on endlessly (because n is a variable)
19. There are infinitely many truths in themselves (because of 18.)

==== Judgments and cognitions ====
A known truth has as its parts (Bestandteile) a truth in itself and a judgment (Bolzano, Wissenschaftslehre §26). A judgment is a thought which states a true proposition. In judging (at least when the matter of the judgment is a true proposition), the idea of an object is being connected in a certain way with the idea of a characteristic (§ 23). In true judgments, the relation between the idea of the object and the idea of the characteristic is an actual/existent relation (§28).

Every judgment has as its matter a proposition, which is either true or false. Every judgment exists, but not "für sich". Judgments, namely, in contrast with propositions in themselves, are dependent on subjective mental activity. Not every mental activity, though, has to be a judgment; recall that all judgments have as matter propositions, and hence all judgments need to be either true or false. Mere presentations or thoughts are examples of mental activities which do not necessarily need to be stated (behaupten), and so are not judgments (§ 34).

Judgments that have as its matter true propositions can be called cognitions (§36). Cognitions are also dependent on the subject, and so, opposed to truths in themselves, cognitions do permit degrees; a proposition can be more or less known, but it cannot be more or less true. Every cognition implies necessarily a judgment, but not every judgment is necessarily cognition, because there are also judgments that are not true. Bolzano maintains that there are no such things as false cognitions, only false judgments (§34).

== Philosophical legacy ==
Bolzano came to be surrounded by a circle of friends and pupils who spread his thoughts about (the so-called Bolzano Circle), but the effect of his thought on philosophy initially seemed destined to be slight.

Alois Höfler (1853–1922), a former student of Franz Brentano and Alexius Meinong, who subsequently become professor of pedagogy at the University of Vienna, created the "missing link between the Vienna Circle and the Bolzano tradition in Austria." Bolzano's work was rediscovered, however, by Edmund Husserl and Kazimierz Twardowski, both students of Brentano. Through them, Bolzano became a formative influence on both phenomenology and analytic philosophy.

== Writings ==
- Bolzano: Gesamtausgabe (Bolzano: Collected Works), critical edition edited by Eduard Winter, Jan Berg, Friedrich Kambartel, Bob van Rootselaar, Stuttgart: Fromman-Holzboog, 1969ff. (103 Volumes available, 28 Volumes in preparation).
- Wissenschaftslehre, 4 vols., 2nd rev. ed. by W. Schultz, Leipzig I–II 1929, III 1980, IV 1931; Critical Edition edited by Jan Berg: Bolzano's Gesamtausgabe, vols. 11–14 (1985–2000).
- Bernard Bolzano's Grundlegung der Logik. Ausgewählte Paragraphen aus der Wissenschaftslehre, Vols. 1 and 2, with supplementary text summaries, an introduction and indices, edited by F. Kambartel, Hamburg, 1963, 1978².
- Bolzano, Bernard (1810), Beyträge zu einer begründeteren Darstellung der Mathematik. Erste Lieferung (Contributions to a better grounded presentation of mathematics; Ewald 1996, pp. 174–224 and The Mathematical Works of Bernard Bolzano, 2004, pp. 83–137).
- Bolzano, Bernard (1817), Rein analytischer Beweis des Lehrsatzes, dass zwischen je zwey Werthen, die ein entgegengesetzes Resultat gewähren, wenigstens eine reele Wurzel der Gleichung liege, Wilhelm Engelmann (Purely analytic proof of the theorem that between any two values which give results of opposite sign, there lies at least one real root of the equation; Ewald 1996, pp. 225–48.
- Franz Prihonsky (1850), Der Neue Anti-Kant, Bautzen (an assessment of the Critique of Pure Reason by Bolzano, published posthumously by his friend F. Prihonsky).*Bolzano, Bernard (1851), Paradoxien des Unendlichen, C.H. Reclam (Paradoxes of the Infinite; Ewald 1996, pp. 249–92 (excerpt)).

Most of Bolzano's work remained in manuscript form, so it had a very small circulation and little influence on the development of the subject.

=== Translations and compilations ===
- Translations of Bolzano's Theory of Science (Full original title: Wissenschaftslehre. Versuch einer ausführlichen und größtentheils neuen Darstellung der Logik mit steter Rücksicht auf deren bisherige Bearbeiter. First edition published in 1837 in four volumes).
  - Theory of Science (selection edited and translated by Rolf George, Berkeley and Los Angeles: University of California Press, 1972).
  - Theory of Science (selection edited, with an introduction, by Jan Berg. Translated from the German by Burnham Terrell, Dordrecht and Boston: D. Reidel Publishing Company, 1973).
  - Theory of Science, first complete English translation in four volumes by Rolf George and Paul Rusnock, New York: Oxford University Press, 2014.
- Russ, S. B. (1980). "A translation of Bolzano's paper on the intermediate value theorem". Historia Mathematica. 7 (2): 156–185. doi:10.1016/0315-0860(80)90036-1. (Translation of Rein analytischer Beweis des Lehrsatzes, dass zwischen je zwey Werthen, die ein entgegengesetzes Resultat gewähren, wenigstens eine reelle Wurzel der Gleichung liege (Prague 1817))
- The Mathematical Works of Bernard Bolzano, translated and edited by Steve Russ, New York: Oxford University Press, 2004 (re-printed 2006).
- On the Mathematical Method and Correspondence with Exner, translated by Rolf George and Paul Rusnock, Amsterdam: Rodopi, 2004.
- Selected Writings on Ethics and Politics, translated by Rolf George and Paul Rusnock, Amsterdam: Rodopi, 2007.
- Bolzano's Philosophy of Grounding: Translations and Studies, edited by Stefan Roski and Benjamin Schnieder, Oxford, 2022. (Contains both selected translations of Bolzano and some academic papers and commentary.)

== See also ==
- List of Roman Catholic scientist-clerics

== Sources ==
- Boyer, Carl B. (1959), The History of the Calculus and Its Conceptual Development, New York: Dover Publications, MR 0124178.
- Boyer, Carl B.; Merzbach, Uta C. (1991), A History of Mathematics, New York: John Wiley & Sons, ISBN 978-0-471-54397-8.
- Ewald, William B., ed. (1996), From Kant to Hilbert: A Source Book in the Foundations of Mathematics, 2 volumes, Oxford University Press.
- Künne, Wolfgang (1998), "Bolzano, Bernard", Routledge Encyclopedia of Philosophy, vol. 1, London: Routledge, pp. 823–827.
- O'Connor, John J.; Robertson, Edmund F. (2005), "Bolzano", MacTutor History of Mathematics archive.
