= Milan Machovec =

Czech philosopher (1925–2003)

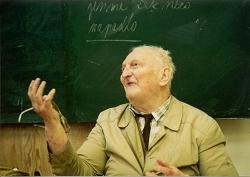
- Milan Machovec at Charles University in 1999
- Born: 23 August 1925; Prague, Czechoslovakia
- Died: 15 January 2003 (aged 77); Prague, Czech Republic
- Spouse: Markéta Hajná (m. 1953; died 1978)
- Children: Martin Machovec (b. 1956), Helena Machovcová (b. 1962)
- Relatives: Dušan Machovec (younger brother)
- Awards: Order of Tomáš Garrigue Masaryk, class III (2000)

Education
- Education: Charles University
- Academic advisor: Karel Svoboda

Philosophical work
- Era: 20th-century philosophy
- Region: Continental philosophy
- School: Humanism, Marxism, Christian atheism, Czechoslovak philosophy
- Notable students: Egon Bondy
- Main interests: Dialogue, humanity, ethics, history, society, theology, ecology, feminism
- Notable works: Jesus for Modern Man • The Meaning of Human Existence

Milan Machovec (23 August 1925 – 15 January 2003) was a Czech philosopher. He lectured at the Charles University in Prague in 1950–1970, in the first half of the Czechoslovak communist era. Machovec is best known for hosting Christian-Marxist dialogue among major Czech- and German-speaking thinkers in the 1960s. He was forced out of the university for his involvement in the Prague Spring of 1968 and became a dissident underground intellectual for the second half of the communist era.

In 1990, Machovec returned to his academic position for life and published his previously banned Jesus for Modern Man (Ježíš pro moderního člověka, original 1969, translated into English in 1976 as A Marxist Looks at Jesus). His other works similarly sought to popularize the legacy of landmark figures, such as Jan Hus (1953), Augustine (1967) or Tomáš Masaryk (1968). He expressed his own humanist philosophy in The Meaning of Human Existence (Smysl lidské existence, 1965/2002).

== Biography ==
Machovec had studied philosophy and classical philology at the Faculty of Arts of Charles University amidst the onset of the Czechoslovak communist era, becoming docent of the history of philosophy in 1953. Although a convinced socialist and scientific atheist, he retained his earlier passion for liberal democratic and Catholic worldviews, generally identifying with humanism. In the 1960s, he organized Christian-Marxist dialogue in Czech and German, visited by major Central European thinkers including Erich Fromm, Ernst Bloch or the theologian Karl Rahner. The planned publication of his major work on Jesus, however, was destroyed in 1969 after the Prague Spring, a national reform movement in which Machovec participated and whose suppression he protested internationally with an open letter.

In the ensuing normalization era, Machovec was expelled from the university and became a dissident. He organized underground "flat seminars" (in the dissenting intellectual network of "flat universities") and samizdat publications, with the continued support of foreign friends. After signing Charter 77, a civil rights movement championed by fellow ex-academic philosopher Jan Patočka, he was denied even his surrogate job as a church organist. His ex-wife Markéta Machovcová (née Hajná), mother to his two children, died of cancer in 1978.

In 1990 after the Velvet Revolution, Machovec's Jesus for Modern Man (Ježíš pro moderního člověka) was finally officially published in Czech (long since translations such as the 1972 German Jesus für Atheisten and 1976 English A Marxist Looks at Jesus). He simultaneously returned to his academic position and to official recognition, later highlighted by a 2000 Order of Tomáš Garrigue Masaryk award.

== Work ==
Milan Machovec wrote for a broad audience, mainly about the spiritual legacy of major historical figures, which beside Jesus (1969/1990) included Tacitus (1948), Jan Hus (1953), František Palacký (1961), Thomas Aquinas and neo-Thomism (1962), Josef Dobrovský (1964), Augustine (1967), Tomáš Masaryk (1968), and Achilles (2000). He sought to popularize philosophy, as engaging with the moral issues of modern society. He also drew on Aristotle and Kant. Machovec thematized his humanist philosophical anthropology in works on The Meaning of Human Existence (Smysl lidské existence, 1965/2002). Since the 1980s, he also addressed questions of ecology and feminism.

Beginning in the 1960s, he supported the philosophical work of his friend Egon Bondy, with his son Martin Machovec later becoming the editor of Bondy's vast opus.
