= Egon Bondy =

Czech poet, philosopher and writer (1930-2007)

- Egon Bondy, 2002
- Born: 20 January 1930; Prague
- Died: 9 April 2007 (aged 77); Bratislava
- Occupations: philosopher, writer, poet

Egon Bondy, born Zbyněk Fišer (20 January 1930 in Prague – 9 April 2007 in Bratislava), was a Czech writer, with prolific and distinctive output in poetry, prose and philosophy, one of the leading personalities of the Prague underground within Communist Czechoslovakia. From the 1950s down to the 1980s, his non-conformism made him a target of the totalitarian regime, but he himself also collaborated with the regime's secret police (StB) by informing on other dissidents in his circle.

The scope of Bondy's works is exceptionally broad: he published about thirty books of poetry, ranging from epic poems in early 1950s to meditative philosophical works in the 1980s. He also published about twenty novels, including Invalidní sourozenci, most of them dealing with the topic of crisis in an individual vis a vis society. Despite the deep, existential background of his work, the texts are fresh and entertaining. He himself most valued his philosophical works.

In the late 1940s, Zbyněk Fišer first took on the name Egon Bondy when preparing a 1949 anthology with his surrealist group whose authors all adopted Jewish pseudonyms. Bondy had been the name of a number of prominent Prague Jews (as well as the name of a character in Karel Čapek's classic War with the Newts). A radical Marxist, he was nevertheless dismayed by the Stalinist regime that set in after the 1948 coup in Czechoslovakia. From 1957 to 1961, he studied philosophy and psychology at Charles University in Prague. Thereafter he launched his serious intellectual work with the help of the philosopher Milan Machovec, who became his lifelong friend. He was also a close friend of another famous Prague writer, Bohumil Hrabal. From the 1960s, he was considered a key figure of the Prague underground, particularly once his texts were set to music by The Plastic People of the Universe in the 1970s. His works, suppressed by the 1970s and 1980s normalization regime, were circulated only as samizdat. After the Velvet Revolution, in the 1990s, Bondy moved from Prague to Bratislava.

Bondy was always interested in the study of Karl Marx and in the criticism of both contemporary capitalism and state socialism. At times he took interest in Trotskyism and Maoism for the same reasons. His philosophical work concerns ontological and related ethical problems. He attempts to show the relevance of ontology without any substance or grounding. Aside from Marxism and other non-essentialist currents of modern European philosophy, his notable sources for this line of thinking included Buddhist and Daoist philosophy. He was one of few original 20th century European philosophers to systematically study non-European philosophies, dedicating much of his multi-volume history of philosophy (which has been criticized by academic authors as giving a highly personal perspective) to Indian, Chinese and Islamicate philosophies. Milan Machovec praised his Consolation of Ontology (1968) as a landmark philosophical work, and his son Martin Machovec later became the editor of Bondy's works.

== See also ==
- List of Czech writers
