= Invalidní sourozenci =

1974 novel by Egon Bondy

Invalidní sourozenci (The Invalid Siblings) is a Czech science fiction novel by Egon Bondy. It was first published in 1974.
