= Defensivism =

Defensivism is a philosophical standpoint related in spirit to the non-aggression principle. It is a halfway point between other combat or violence based philosophies, such as just war and pacifism.

== Concept ==
Defensivism has a standpoint that only defensive actions are moral. One may move to aid someone in immediate danger or protect oneself from immediate harm. To a country, it holds that a military force may never leave its own borders except to move to the aid of someone else, and in such a situation, that it may protect from harm only if it is specifically invited to, with no aggressive action taken.

In principle, any form of pre-emptive strike, capture, revenge, or firing the first actual shot or throwing the first actual blow is against the defensivist standpoint. If an action must be halted to stop an aggressor from achieving a goal to harm, defensivism allows for actions that assist in removing an imminent threat such as searching an airline passenger for bombs, stopping an aggressor from detonating a bomb, and stopping an aggressor from harming an innocent person. Pre-emptive action must be taken only to mitigate an imminent threat, not to remove a potential threat.

Any form of combative action must cease once the opposition stops fighting, withdraws, surrenders, or ceases the aggressive action.

That does not apply if an aggressor remains an imminent threat upon retreat, as in the case of a gunman shooting a police officer and then fleeing into the public still armed. In such cases, the assailant's "retreat" from the first scene still poses an imminent threat to the public, which gives defenders the right to pursue the threat and to use force to defend the public from further danger by apprehending the assailant or using any force that is necessary to mitigate the danger.

Generally, defensivism allows the taking of life only if the life that would be taken actively threatens another person's life, including significant bodily harm.

In foreign policy, defensivism is equated with the policy of a free society, which stresses the social primacy of liberty.

=== Revolutionary defensivism ===
Vladimir Lenin proposed a version of defensivism, which he called "revolutionary defensivism" in which war is pursued only as a matter of necessity, not for the sake of conquest. The latter, in his view, is pursued for capitalist interest and annexation rather than democratic peace. There were Soviet thinkers who described a defensive war strategy that drew from the works of Alexander Svechin. They promoted a type of counteroffensive that does not inflict a decisive defeat on the enemy and is limited to one side's own territory. Some of the thinkers also favored defensive attrition warfare with limited war aims, as opposed to an objective of complete destruction.

== See also ==
- Self-defence in international law
- Resistance movement
