= Czech philosophy =

Philosophical ideas connected to Czech culture

Czech philosophy has often eschewed "pure" speculative philosophy, emerging rather in the course of intellectual debates in the fields of education (e.g. Jan Amos Komenský), art (e.g. Karel Teige), literature (e.g. Milan Kundera), and especially politics (e.g. Tomáš Garrigue Masaryk, Ivan Sviták, Václav Havel). A source drawing from literature, however, distinguished the Czech national philosophy from the speculative tradition of German thought, citing that it emerged from folk wisdom and peasant reasoning.

Masaryk is credited for introducing the epistemological problem into the modern Czech philosophy, which in turn influenced the discourse on symbol and symbolization. Czech philosophers have also played a central role in the development of phenomenology, whose German-speaking founder Edmund Husserl was born in the Czech lands. Czechs Jan Patočka and Václav Bělohradský would later make important contributions to phenomenological thought. Philosophy in Communist Czechoslovakia officially had to conform to Soviet-style Marxist-Leninist dialectical materialism, but this also produced some interesting moments such as the thought of Karel Kosík or the international Marxist-Christian dialogue led by Milan Machovec in the 1960s leading up to the Prague Spring.

Positivism became an important and dominant trend of modern Czech philosophy, eclipsing herbatianism, in what is explained as a collective "post-revolutionary" thinking characterized by an attempt to open a window to Europe in order to eliminate traces of philosophical provincialism.
