= Lu Zhen =

Personal details
- Born: 957 or January 958 Qiyang, Yong Prefecture, Wuping
- Died: October or November 1014 Song dynasty
- Children: Lu Lun (路綸); Wife of Di Fei (狄棐)
- Parent: Lu Xunmei (路洵美) (father)

Chinese name
- Chinese: 路振
Transcriptions
Standard Mandarin
- Hanyu Pinyin: Lù Zhèn
- Wade–Giles: Lu^{4} Chên^{4}

Lu Zifa
- Traditional Chinese: 路子發
- Simplified Chinese: 路子发
Transcriptions
Standard Mandarin
- Hanyu Pinyin: Lù Zǐfā
- Wade–Giles: Lu^{4} Tzu^{3}-fa^{1}

Lu Zhen (c.957–1014), courtesy name Zifa, was a Song dynasty scholar-official, historian, poet and diplomat. He was famous for his writings, including Jiu Guo Zhi, a history book on the Five Dynasties period.

== Biography ==
Lu Zhen was a great-grandson of the Tang dynasty grand councilor Lu Yan. In the early 940s, his father Lu Xunmei (路洵美) served as an aide to the Chu governor Ma Xigao (馬希杲) in Lian Prefecture (in modern Guangdong). Lu Zhen was born in 957 in Qiyang in Yong Prefecture (in modern Hunan), then ruled by the warlord Zhou Xingfeng; in 963 this domain would be incorporated into the Song dynasty territory. Before he was five Lu Zhen could already read Confucian Classics such as Classic of Filial Piety and Analects. When he was 11 his father died, leaving the family destitute, but his strict mother made sure he focused on his studies every day no matter the season.

In 992 Lu Zhen passed the imperial examination. However, Emperor Taizong felt the exam was too easy and did not adequately cover ancient philosophical classics, so he gave the graduates another test question: compose a fu on "Zhiyan Richu" (卮言日出; "Goblet Words Appear Daily"), an expression found in the Zhuangzi. Most of the hundreds of graduates could not remember the quote, but the studious Lu Zhen was the exception. His composition, which skillfully contained numerous classical references, was well-liked by the emperor. Lu Zhen's official career began as a case reviewer (評事) in the Court of Judicial Review (大理寺), Vice-Prefect (通判) of Bin Prefecture (in modern Shaanxi), and later Vice-Prefect of Xu Prefecture (in modern Jiangsu). He later returned to the capital Kaifeng to work in the Historiography Institute (史館) with a concurrent appointment of "Companion for the Heir Apparent" (太子中允).

In late 1000, he was serving as the Prefect of Bin Prefecture (in modern Shandong, a different prefecture than the one he stationed earlier), when the Khitan-ruled Liao dynasty invaded from the north. One day, the Liao forces arrived outside the city gate, and locals began to panic. Some began to cry, knowing that Lu Zhen had no military experience. Lu Zhen comforted the people, and told them he would focus on the city's defense and not actively engage the much stronger enemy. After a few days, the Liao army withdrew. Liu Zong (劉綜), the fiscal commissioner (轉運使) of Hebei Circuit, praised Lu Zhen in a report to Emperor Zhenzong.

After he was recalled to the capital, Lu Zhen served as a judge in the Court of Judicial review and an aide in the Court of Imperial Sacrifices (太常寺) before serving as Prefects first in Hezhong Prefecture (in modern Shanxi) and later in Deng Prefecture (in modern Henan). Some time between 1004 and 1007 he served as Pacifícation Commissioner (巡撫使) of Fujian Circuit. In 1009 he was sent to the Liao dynasty on a diplomatic mission; his experiences were recorded as "Cheng Yao Lu" (乘軺錄, "An Account of Riding the Carriage").

Lu Zhen was an alcoholic and died in late 1014 from an illness. During his later years he wrote the Jiu Guo Zhi, a history book on the Five Dynasties and Ten Kingdoms period, but he died before he could finish it. His son Lu Lun (路綸), who became a Master of Ceremonies (奉禮郎) in the Court of Imperial Sacrifices (太常寺) upon his death, added 2 chapters to the book.

== Poetry ==
The 18th-century collection Recorded Occasions of Song Poetry includes 3 poems by Lu Zhen:

- "A Gift to Wu Bin, Recorder of Anyi County, for His Retirement" (贈安邑簿伍彬歸隱)
- "Writing on the Wall of Master Huiquan" (題惠泉師壁)
- "Hacking Brambles" (伐棘篇)

== Notes and references ==
- Li Tao (1183). Xu Zizhi Tongjian Changbian (續資治通鑑長編) [Extended Continuation to Zizhi Tongjian] (in Chinese).
- Toqto'a; et al., eds. (1345). Song Shi (宋史) [History of Song] (in Chinese).
