= Binzhou (disambiguation) =

Binzhou (滨州) is a prefecture-level city in Shandong, China.

Binzhou may also refer to:

- Binzhou, Shaanxi (彬州市), county-level city in China
- Pennsylvania, United States (宾夕法尼亚州) which has a Chinese abbreviation called 宾州 (Pinyin: bīn zhōu, literally "Penn's State")

== Towns ==
- Binzhou, Heilongjiang (宾州镇), in Bin County
- Binzhou, Guangxi (宾州镇), in Binyang County

== Historical prefectures ==
- Bin Prefecture (Guangxi) (賓州), a prefecture between the 7th and 20th centuries in modern Guangxi
- Bin Prefecture (Shaanxi) (邠州), a prefecture between the 8th and 20th centuries in modern Shaanxi
- Bin Prefecture (Shandong) (濱州), a prefecture between the 10th and 20th centuries in modern Shandong

== See also ==
- Bin (disambiguation)
