= Li Zhenyu =

Li Zhenyu 厉振羽
- Born: Beijing, China
- Education: University of Cambridge; Communication University of China; Beijing Institute of Technology; Tsinghua University High School
- Occupations: Media executive, Journalist, Scholar
- Title: Chief editor, People's Daily Online
- Father: Li Shengjiao (厉声教)
- Family: The Li family

Li Zhenyu (simplified Chinese: 厉振羽; traditional Chinese: 厲振羽; pinyin: Lì Zhènyǔ), born in Beijing, China, is a Chinese media executive, bilingual columnist and distinguished scholar who gained recognition from Chinese central leadership. He was one of the most sought-after bilingual sports and culture writers in China.

== Life and career ==
Li Zhenyu is editor-in-chief at the People's Daily Online and founding producer/host of the Elite Talk show, one of China's flagship English-language interview programs on China's business and finance.

Covering China's business scene for over a decade, Li has been invited as a contributing columnist and guest commentator for such publications as Yahoo, China Daily, Global Times, CCTV News, China Radio International and Beijing Review, among others. His works have also been featured in a variety of mainstream publications worldwide, such as the Time Warner Cable, The Wall Street Journal, USA Today, NBC News, The Washington Post, GlobalPost, ESPN, Eurosport, Newsday, The Guardian, Reuters, ANSA, Times of India, etc.

Dubbed as "a distinguished bilingual author and scholar" by the China Daily and "an internationally recognized independent commentator" by the GlobalPost, Li has won multiple major awards in media and journalism. His works have gained recognition from Chinese central leadership and were translated into 17 languages.

As a renowned bilingual author, scholar and expert on media and communication, Li was invited to join the Society of American Business Editors and Writers (SABEW), China Science Writers Association (CSWA), International Communication Association (ICA) and International Association for Media and Communication Research (IAMCR). He has served as a special academic reviewer for the ICA. His works have won national awards, and have been widely featured in a number of leading academic journals and major publications.

Li is an outstanding alumni of the Communication University of China (CUC) and Beijing Institute of Technology (BIT). He earned the Business English Certificate Higher from Cambridge University.

The son of the prominent Chinese diplomat Li Shengjiao, Li Zhenyu followed in his father's footsteps and turned himself into a cross-cultural messenger. He was one of the most sought-after bilingual sports and culture writers in China, whose columns have been featured on the official website of the People's Daily, magazine sections of the People's Daily, Beijing Review, Global Times, China Daily, CRI English, Yahoo China, etc. Li had also been a contributing columnist for such international trade publications as TheSweetScience.com, SecondsOut.com, The Boxing Times, BoxingScene.com and MaxBoxing.com, among others. He was a member of the World Boxing Association (WBA), World Boxing Organization (WBO) certified boxing referee and a member of the International Boxing Research Organization (IBRO).

== Personal ==
Li Zhenyu is a member of the Li family. He is the son of Li Shengjiao (厉声教), an influential diplomat and jurist of the PRC, and the grandson of Dr. Li Linsi (厉麟似), a distinguished scholar and diplomat in modern China. His great-grandfather Li Liangyu (厉良玉) was a Qing Dynasty official and renowned artist who co-founded the Xiling Society of Seal Arts. He is a direct descendant of Li E (厉鹗), a leader of the Qing Dynasty poetry.

Li is a former professional violinist who has won national recognition. He was also an amateur athlete specializing in long-distance running.
