= Bin =

BIN or Bin may refer to:

== Abbreviations ==
- Badan Intelijen Negara, Indonesia's state intelligence agency
- Bank Identification Number
- Belgian Institute for Normalization
- Believe in Nothing
- Black Information Network, a radio network
- British India (FIFA country code: BIN), the portions of present-day India, Bangladesh, Pakistan, and Myanmar that were under British colonial rule
- Business identification number

== Physical containers ==
- Waste container
- Recycling bin
- Bulk box, a pallet-size box used for storage and shipping of bulk quantities
- Coal bin

== People ==
- Bin Uehara, a Japanese singer
- Bin Ukishima (浮嶋 敏; born 1967), Japanese footballer and manager
- Bianca Bin, a Brazilian actress
- BIN (Band), Japanese musical group
- Paulo Bin (born 1941), Brazilian footballer

== Places ==
- Bin (city), a settlement in Xia- and Shang-dynasty China
- Bin, Iran, a village in Mazandaran Province, Iran
- Bin County, Shaanxi in Xianyang, Shaanxi, China
- Bin County, Heilongjiang in Harbin, Heilongjiang, China

== Science and mathematics ==
- an interval (mathematics), a mesh, or another partition of a topological space, used in different applications fields:
  - Histogram bin
  - Data binning, a data pre-processing technique
  - Bin (computational geometry), space partitioning data structure to enable fast region queries and nearest neighbor search

== Other uses ==
- Sin bin, an informal name for a penalty box in sports
- In Arabic personal names, "son of", e.g. in "Hamad bin Khalid bin Hamad" (a variant of ibn)
- Bini language (ISO code: bin), a language of Edo State, Nigeria
- /bin, a folder in the Unix filesystem
- Bin, a location in a cellar where wine is stored; see glossary of wine terms
- .bin, a file extension for binary data

== See also ==
- Binn (disambiguation)
- Been (disambiguation)
- Binary (disambiguation)
- Money bin, a fictional structure of Scrooge McDuck
