= Satish Chander Dhawan Government College =

Indian educational institution

Satish Chandra Dhawan Government College, Ludhiana
- ਸਤੀਸ਼ ਚੰਦਰ ਧਵਨ ਸਰਕਾਰੀ ਕਾਲਜ, ਲੁਧਿਆਣਾ
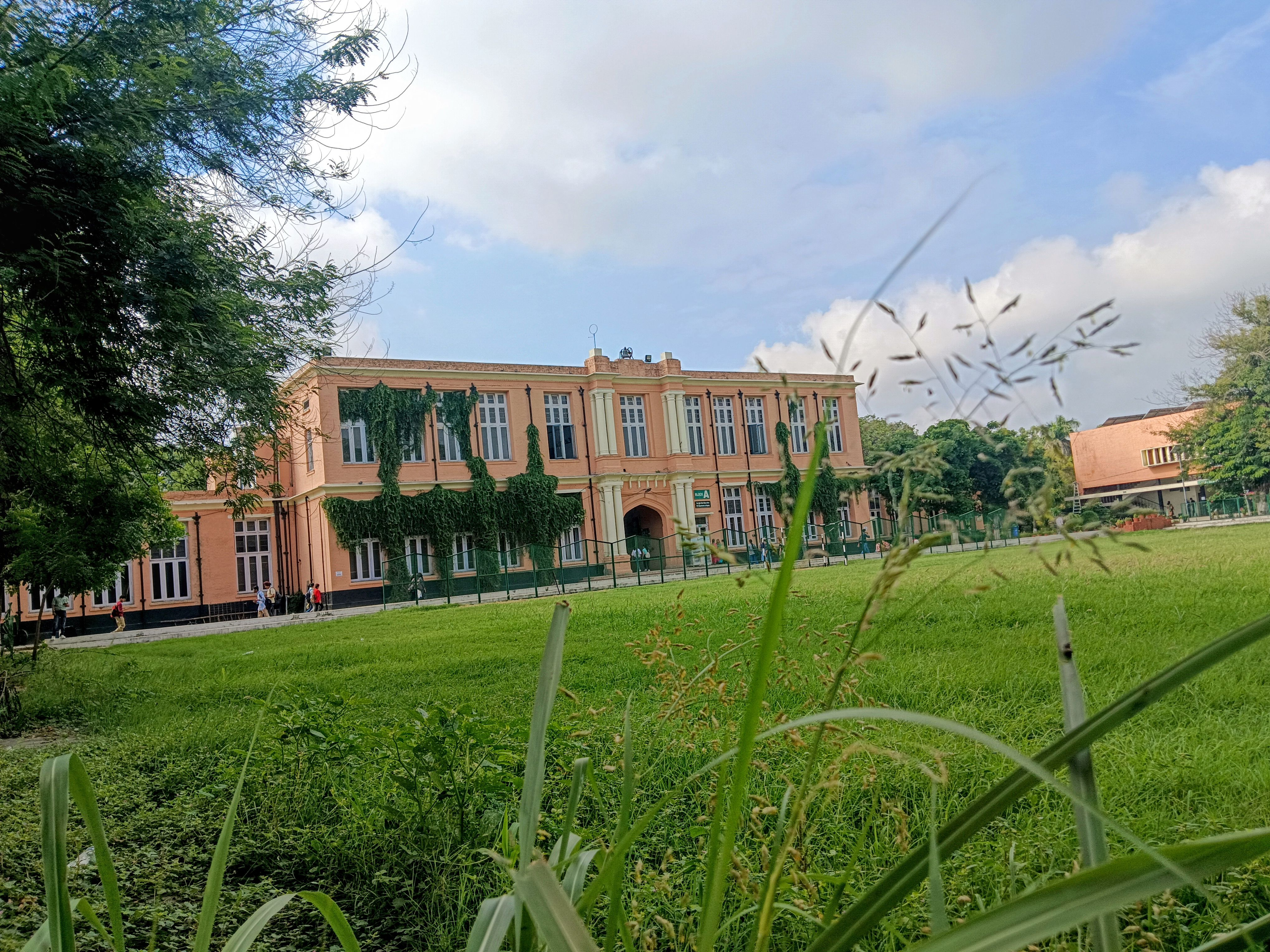
- Block A of College
- Other names: SCD College &Govt.College Boys
- Former names: Imperial College, Ludhiana
- Motto: ਸੱਚ ਬੋਲਣ ਦਾ ਜੇਰਾ ਕਰ
- Motto in English: Dare to be True
- Type: Public
- Established: 1920
- Accreditation: NAAC:A
- Affiliations: Panjab University, Chandigarh
- Location: Ludhiana, India
- Campus: 42 acre; Urban
- Website: https://scdgovtcollege.ac.in/

Satish Chander Dhawan Government College, commonly referred to as S.C.D. Government College, Ludhiana, formerly Imperial College, Ludhiana and Government College for Boys, Ludhiana, is an educational institution located in Ludhiana, Punjab, India. The college offers various courses in Humanities, Commerce and Science for graduation and post graduation level studies.

== History ==
S.C.D. Government College was established in 1920 as Imperial College. Early Classes were conducted in Barracks of World War I.

== Notable alumni ==
- Satish Chandra Dhawan, space scientist and Former Chairman of ISRO
- Sahir Ludhianvi, Famous urdu poet and film lyricists
- Keki N. Daruwalla, Indian poet and short story writer in English
- Narinder Nath Vohra, 12th Governor of Jammu and Kashmir
- Manohar Singh Gill (IAS), former Minister of Statistics and Programme Implementation, Minister of Youth and Sports Affairs & 11th Chief Election Commissioner of India
- Amit Singh Bakshi, two-time Asian Games medalist in track and field and Olympic gold medalist in field hockey
- Arshpreet Bhullar, basketball player
- Nehal Wadhera, Indian Cricketer
