= Li Shengjiao =

Chinese diplomat, jurist, and scholar (1935–2017)

- 厉声教
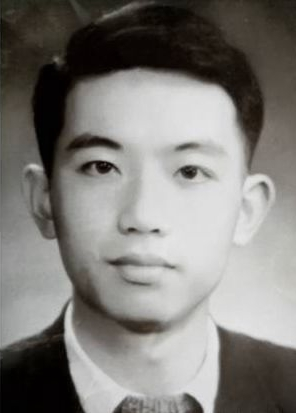
- Born: January 7, 1935; Nanjing, China
- Died: August 6, 2017 (aged 82); Beijing, China
- Education: Nanjing University; China Foreign Affairs University
- Occupations: Diplomat, jurist, educator
- Employer: Ministry of Foreign Affairs of the People's Republic of China
- Organization: Nanjing University
- Known for: Contribution to China's boundary and ocean affairs
- Title: Counselor of the Ministry of Foreign Affairs; Counselor of the Chinese Mission to the United Nations; Acting Chinese Ambassador to Barbados; First Deputy Consul General of China in Toronto; Honorary professor at Nanjing University
- Father: Dr. Li Linsi

Li Shengjiao (simplified Chinese: 厉声教; traditional Chinese: 厲聲教; pinyin: Lì Shēngjiào; January 7, 1935 – August 6, 2017) was a senior Chinese diplomat, jurist, educator, scholar, bilingual author, former Nanjing sports star and an expert on the I Ching. Being recognized as an authority on international law and U.S.-China relations, Li was known for his contribution to the International Law of the Sea and China's boundary and ocean affairs.

He was regarded as China's top expert on international maritime law and boundary demarcation issues and one of China's most distinguished diplomats. He was a leading authority on international law and China-US relations.

He has been hailed as "an outstanding diplomat, scholar, educator and litterateur who made extraordinary contributions in multiple fields" and "an envoy connecting Chinese and Western cultures".

Li died from an unspecified illness on August 6, 2017, in Beijing at the age of 82.

In 2018, Li was named a "pillar of the nation that passed away in 2017".

== Life and career ==
Li Shengjiao was born in 1935 in Nanjing, the then capital of China, in a distinguished family. His father Dr. Li Linsi was an educator and diplomat who enjoyed equal fame with Shanghai diplomat Wellington Koo, while his mother Tang Liling was a brilliant pianist who was considered by Italian pianist Mario Paci as "the brightest star of tomorrow".

His family moved to Shanghai when he was two years old in 1937. He grew up in Shanghai and made a name for himself in the city for his talent. With a great family tradition and remarkable natural talent, Li was able to write antithetical couplets at the age of 6 and compose poems at the age 8. When he reached his teenage years, he had been capable of writing beautifully both in English and Chinese while speaking with a pure British English.

Li read economic geology at Nanjing University in 1952. While in university, he finished his English-language autobiographical novella, "Shanghai Memories", and the English translation of the masterpieces of his ancestor Li E, a leader in poetry in the Qing Dynasty.

According to Wang Ying, Li's classmate at Nanjing University and an academician of the Chinese Academy of Sciences, Li was widely regarded as "a leader of tomorrow" and "the brightest star of Nanjing University".

Not only was Li considered a rare talent by Nanjing University professors, he also caught the attention of China's Ministry of Foreign Affairs. The ministry reserved a position for him even before his graduation. After he graduated with flying colors, the foreign ministry appointed a representative to invite him three times. He was then 21, the youngest in the ministry. Interestingly, he was a rare breed, who joined the foreign ministry without being either a Communist Party member or a Communist Youth League member.

Li began his diplomatic career in 1956 after graduating from Nanjing University. He was part of a team working on issues of territory, boundaries and demarcation at the foreign ministry, and later went on to study international law.

In 1960, his researches received high recognition from China's top leaders.

During the Cultural Revolution, Li was sent to rural areas to work with farmers on several occasions, and his father died miserably back then. However, throughout the turbulent times, no matter how hard life was, he always supported and sided with Premier Zhou and had a strong faith in the Party.

After China resumed its lawful seat in the UN in 1971, Li engaged in a series of major diplomatic activities and negotiations with the UN, including the 10-year-long United Nations Convention on the Law of the Sea from 1972 to 1982, which resulted in an international agreement that has had profound influence on global politics, economics and security. Li was a major contributor to the creation and implementation of the UNCLOS.

He also participated in a series of significant diplomatic events, including China's ping pong diplomacy, former US President Richard Nixon's historic visit to China in 1972 and the establishment of diplomatic relations between China and the US.

In 1973, he suggested to then Chinese premier Zhou Enlai that China should distinguish 12 nautical miles of territorial sea and a 200 nautical mile exclusive economic zone within the UN law.

As an expert in the foreign ministry, Li played a part in the investigation and study of some major issues on international situation and China's foreign policy and offered advisory opinions to the Central Committee in helping the nation's diplomatic decision-making.

After retiring from the diplomatic position, Li remained as a consultant to the foreign ministry and was invited as an honorary professor at China Foreign Affairs University and Nanjing University. He shifted his focus and dedicated his time to educating the next generation of diplomats and international law experts.

In his 40-plus years as a diplomat, Li served as Counselor of the Chinese Mission to the United Nations Conference on the Law of the Sea, Counselor of the Chinese Mission to the United Nations, Acting Chinese Ambassador to Barbados, First Deputy Consul General of China in Toronto and Counselor of the Ministry of Foreign Affairs of China, among other posts.

Li was widely recognized as an authority on international law, China's boundary and ocean affairs and U.S.-China relations, serving as Counselor of the Chinese Mission to the United Nations and Special Senior Fellow at China's Ministry of Foreign Affairs. He made a great contribution to the creation and implementation of the United Nations Convention on the Law of the Sea (UNCLOS). He was praised and received twice by Chinese Premier Zhou Enlai for his contribution.

An honorary professor at Nanjing University and China Foreign Affairs University, Li was a columnist for The Huffington Post, China Daily and other major publications, weighing in on international affairs, international business and U.S.-China ties.

In 2018 after his death, Li was named a "pillar of the nation that passed away in 2017" by Chinese authorities.

== Sports achievements ==
Li was an all-around sports star in his youth, excelling in soccer, basketball, the 100-meter sprint in track and field, and table tennis. As a regular member of the Nanjing municipal soccer team, the Nanjing municipal basketball team as well as a key player in the Nanjing University basketball team, Li represented the city of Nanjing in several national level matches during his college years at Nanjing University. He was the coach of the basketball team of China's Ministry of Foreign Affairs and the table tennis champion of China's Ministry of Foreign Affairs.

== Legacy ==
Since his death, Li Shengjiao has been regarded as a learned diplomat, a respected jurist, a patriot, and a man of integrity.

Academician of the Chinese Academy of Sciences Wang Ying called Li "an exceptionally outstanding diplomat as well as a prominent scholar". As a diplomat, Li won honors for his country and united the people. His death is a great loss to the nation, Wang said.

Li was described by Tang Wensheng, former English interpreter of Chinese Communist Party chairman Mao Zedong, as both an excellent diplomatic official and a professional expert who had a good command of the English language and solid expertise in foreign affairs.

Former Chinese Ambassador to France Wu Jianmin depicted Li as "a man of decency and high professional competence, and was career-minded."

Former Chinese Ambassador to Russia Wu Tao described Li's character as genuine and industrious, saying that "Li was a modest, self-disciplined gentleman, honest and diligent."

According to former Chinese Ambassador to Luxembourg Shi Yanhua, Li's work ethic and capabilities were respectable. Shi also said that Li "was very articulate and insightful, and had a good eye for detail."

Huang Huikang, an incumbent member of the International Law Commission of the United Nations, delivered his opinion about Li's contribution shortly after his death, saying that "Mr. Li contributed a lot to China's diplomatic cause as well as international law and treaty affairs. He will be remembered forever by people in the international law and treaty community all over the world."

Ouyang Yujing, Director General of the Chinese foreign ministry's Department of Boundary and Ocean Affairs, described Li as "one of the few pioneers in the profession, a doyen and senior expert of China's boundary and ocean affairs".

Li was celebrated by the Shanghai Daily as "an outstanding diplomat, scholar, educator and litterateur, who made extraordinary contributions in multiple fields".

Li's research results received high recognition from Chairman Mao, Premier Zhou and other top Chinese leaders. His research results have had profound influence. Li was an off-stage contributor to some of the most important events and decisions in contemporary China's diplomatic history, such as China's resumption of its lawful seat in the UN, the establishment of diplomatic ties between China and the US, China's signature of the UNCLOS, China's entry into the WTO and Beijing's bid for the 2008 Olympic Games.

Li's contribution also included confirming demarcation lines on the map of China, and resolving boundary disputes on both land and sea with its neighbours.

In a 40-year career he was also involved in China's border negotiations with Myanmar, India, North Korea and the Soviet Union. The negotiations for the UNCLOS, of which China was a signatory, took place between 1973 and 1982, and Li was an important member of the Chinese team.

== Personal ==
A direct descendant of the renowned Qing Dynasty poet and scholar Li E (厉鹗), Li Shengjiao is the son of Li Linsi (厉麟似), a distinguished scholar and diplomat in modern China.

Li, whose given name translates as "to educate with a stern voice", was born in January 1935 to an upper-class family. His mother Tang Liling (唐丽玲) was a renowned pianist and actress, while his father, Li Linsi, was a prominent educator, diplomat and linguist, and a pioneering figure in China-Europe cultural exchanges in the 1930s. His father also had the nickname "China's Mahatma Gandhi" and helped Jews to escape persecution and settle in Shanghai during the second world war.
