= M. S. Gill =

Indian bureaucrat and politician (1936–2023)

Manohar Singh Gill
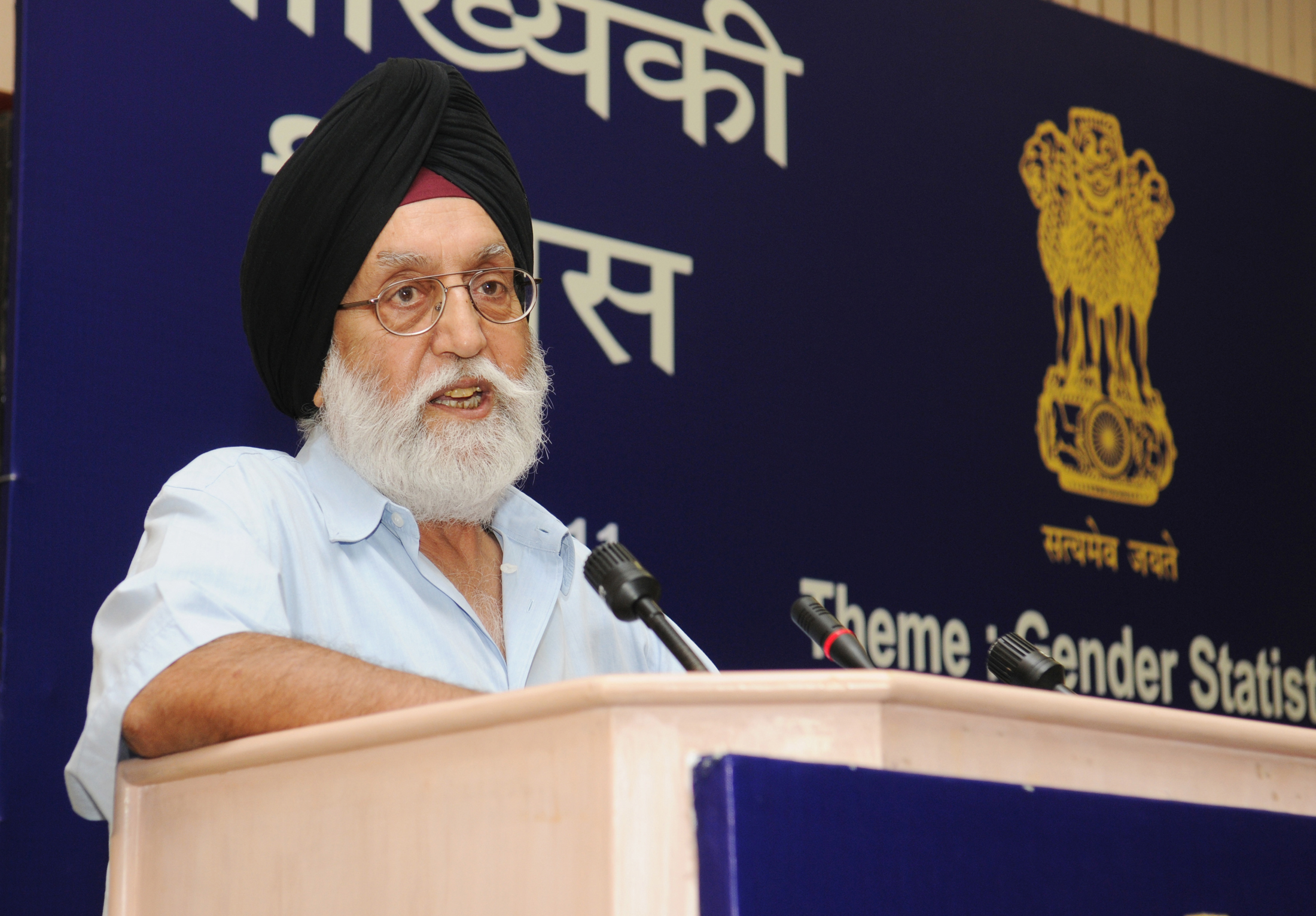
- Gill in 2011

Minister of Statistics and Programme Implementation of India
- In office 19 January 2011 – 12 July 2011
- President: Pratibha Patil
- Prime Minister: Manmohan Singh
- Preceded by: Shriprakash Jaiswal^{[a]}
- Succeeded by: Srikant Kumar Jena^{[a]}

Minister of Sports and Youth Affairs of India
- In office 28 May 2009 – 19 January 2011
- President: Pratibha Patil
- Prime Minister: Manmohan Singh
- Succeeded by: Ajay Maken^{[a]}
- In office 6 April 2008 – 22 May 2009^{[a]}
- Preceded by: Mani Shankar Aiyar

Member of Parliament, Rajya Sabha
- In office 10 April 2004 – 9 April 2016
- Succeeded by: Partap Singh Bajwa
- Constituency: Punjab

11th Chief Election Commissioner of India
- In office 12 December 1996 – 13 June 2001
- President: Shankar Dayal Sharma; K. R. Narayanan
- Prime Minister: H. D. Deve Gowda; I. K. Gujral; Atal Bihari Vajpayee
- Preceded by: T. N. Seshan
- Succeeded by: J. M. Lyngdoh

Personal details
- Born: Manohar Singh Gill; 14 June 1936 Punjab, British India
- Died: 15 October 2023 (aged 87) Delhi, India
- Party: Indian National Congress
- Spouse: Vinnie Gill (m. 1965)
- Children: 3
- Education: St George's College, Mussoorie (B.A.) (M.A.); S.C.D Government College, Ludhiana (PhD) Panjab University (Post-Graduate Diploma) Cambridge University
- Profession: Civil servant, retired IAS officer
- Awards: Padma Vibhushan (2000)
- a. as Minister of State (Independent Charge)

Manohar Singh Gill was an Indian Administrative Service officer from the 1958 batch of the Punjab cadre. He served as the Chief Election Commissioner of India (1996–2001), as the Union Minister of Youth Affairs and Sports (2008–2011) and as Minister of Statistics and Programme Implementation (2011). His tenure as Election commissioner saw the introduction and implementation of EVMs which saw their first extensive deployment in the 1998 general elections of India.

== Early life and education ==
Manohar Singh Gill was born on 14 June 1936 in Aladinpur village, Tarn Taran district, Punjab, British India. He attended St. George's College in Mussoorie from 1947 to 1953 and completed his B.A. in History and Political Science (With honours in English Literature) and an M.A. (Honours) in English Literature from S.C.D Government College, Ludhiana. He later earned a Doctorate in Development Studies from Panjab University. In 1967, he attended Queen's College, Cambridge University for a post-graduate diploma in Developmental Studies, and was subsequently invited back on a Nuffield Fellowship to research Punjab's agricultural cooperatives. This work became his doctoral thesis.

== Civil service career ==
In 1958, Manohar Singh Gill joined the Indian Administrative Services in Punjab cadre and served at various places in different capacities in undivided Punjab until 1966 when Punjab was trifurcated to carve out the separate states of Himachal Pradesh and Haryana. His early postings included sub-divisional magistrate in Mahendragarh, now in Haryana; Deputy Commissioner and Collector of the then Lahaul-Spiti district (1961–62), during the Sino-Indian War; and the District Collector of Ambala and Jalandhar (1965–67).

In 1968, he led the Indian contingent to the Mexico City Olympics. He subsequently served as Principal Secretary to the Chief Minister of Punjab (1977–80). From 1981 to 1985, he organised and led the Sokoto Agricultural Development Project in Nigeria, a World Bank-funded programme.

As Development Commissioner of Punjab (1985–88), Gill was a strong advocate for agricultural diversification, working to reduce the state's dependence on the wheat-paddy cycle. He supported the recommendations of the SS Johl Committee, which called for shifting area under rice and wheat to alternative crops including fruits, vegetables, pulses, oilseeds and sugarcane. He oversaw a major expansion of the cooperative sugar milling sector, with 11 working mills crushing 14,000 TCD at the start of his tenure, and four new mills of 2,500 TCD each commissioned with a target of approximately 32,000 TCD by 1990–91 and strengthened MILKFED, the state's dairy cooperative, which by 1988 had a turnover of Rs 80 crore, a milk plant in every district, and around 5,000 cooperative societies across the state. He was also instrumental in facilitating the entry of Pepsi Cola into Punjab in 1988 for a processed food and vegetable joint venture, with a target of processing 1,00,000 tonnes of fruit annually.

He was then appointed Secretary, Department of Chemicals, Petrochemicals and Pharmaceuticals, Government of India (1988–92) and subsequently served as Secretary, Ministry of Agriculture and Cooperatives, Government of India (1992–93).

Gill was appointed Election Commissioner of India in 1993 and served as the 11th Chief Election Commissioner of India from 12 December 1996 to 13 June 2001, succeeding T. N. Seshan. During his tenure, the Election Commission successfully conducted the general elections to the 12th Lok Sabha (1998) and 13th Lok Sabha (1999), the 11th Presidential and Vice-Presidential elections (1997), and assembly elections in more than 20 states. His principal achievement was the nationwide introduction of Electronic Voting Machines (EVMs) beginning in 1998. He also oversaw the digitisation of the electoral roll and computerisation of voter data, the mandatory integration of Electors Photo Identity Cards (EPICs) with the computerised electoral roll, the launch of the Election Commission website, and comprehensive electoral reform proposals covering revised election expense ceilings and measures to decriminalise elections. In 1999, he was awarded the Nishan-e-Khalsa at the tricentenary of the Khalsa. He was awarded the Padma Vibhushan and the Dadabhai Naoroji New Millennium International Award in 2000 for his services as Chief Election Commissioner.

== Political career ==
In April 2004, three years after his retirement from the election commission, he was elected to the Rajya Sabha from Punjab as a representative of the Indian National Congress. He was re-elected in 2010 and continued to serve as its member until the completion of his tenure on 9 April 2016. During his two terms, he served on parliamentary committees covering agriculture, external affairs, civil aviation, food and consumer affairs, urban development, chemicals and fertilisers, medical education, and security. He was President of the India–Poland Parliamentary Friendship Group from September 2007, and served on the Board of the Institute of Democracy and Electoral Assistance (IDEA) in Stockholm and the International Centre for Democratic Transition (ICDT) in Budapest. In a cabinet reshuffle held on 6 April 2008, he was inducted to the union council of ministers as Minister of State (Independent Charge) in the Ministry of Youth Affairs and Sports.

Following the Congress Party's victory in the 2009 Indian election, he was re-inducted into the council of ministers and held cabinet rank in the second term. He continued to serve as the minister of Youth Affairs and Sports. During his tenure as Sports Minister, he re-established formal national conferences of State Sports Ministers, the first being held on 9 July 2008, to align state and central sports policy. He launched the Panchayat Yuva Krida Aur Khel Abhiyan (PYKKA) scheme to provide basic sports facilities at the grassroots level throughout the country. He brought the Indian Olympic Association and National Sports Federations under the purview of the Right to Information Act, confirmed by the Delhi High Court on 7 January 2010. He introduced mandatory annual recognition procedures for National Sports Federations and required them to hold free, fair and transparent elections. The budgetary allocation of the Sports Authority of India was doubled from Rs. 160 crore in 2009–10 to Rs. 321 crore for 2010–11. It was during this tenure that India hosted the 2010 Commonwealth Games in New Delhi. The games, signed in 2003 had been mired in controversy and allegations of corruption against Suresh Kalmadi and other prior organisers. Gill was brought in at a later stage to try and resolve the various concerns and prepare the stadiums and other facilities in time for the games. Gill was then appointed as Minister of Statistics and Programme Implementation on 19 January 2011 and served until his resignation on 12 July 2011.

As a Member of Parliament, Gill extensively utilised his MPLAD funds on the development of educational institutions across Punjab, with an emphasis on girls education, particularly in the remote border districts. Among major universities that received grants from his MPLAD funds were Punjab Agricultural University, Ludhiana (for the extension of the Dr Amrita Pritam girls' hostel block), Guru Nanak Dev University, Amritsar (for the Asian Study Centre building which is now the School of Social Sciences), the Sahir Ludhianvi Library at Panjabi Bhawan, Ludhiana, SCD Government College, Ludhiana (for the building and expansion of the Amrita Shergill Girl's Hostel on its premises), Guru Angad Dev Veterinary and Animal Sciences University, Ludhiana (for their girls' hostel) and SGAD Government College, Tarn Taran.

He served as chief of the parliamentary committee for the development of Amritsar airport, successfully working to secure an Amritsar–Sharjah flight and contributing to the overall development of Sri Guru Ram Dass Jee International Airport. He campaigned for the installation of an 18-foot bronze statue of Bhagat Singh outside Parliament House, New Delhi, unveiled on 15 August 2008, and advocated for it to depict Bhagat Singh wearing a turban instead of a hat, a choice that generated public debate. He also arranged for statues of Punjab heroes to be placed across the state, including Flying Officer Nirmaljit Singh Sekhon, the only Indian Air Force recipient of the Param Vir Chakra.

== Mountaineering ==
Gill trained under Tenzing Norgay at the Himalayan Mountaineering Institute, Darjeeling in 1960, and climbed to approximately 20,000 feet in the Parbati Valley, Kullu. He served as President of the Indian Mountaineering Foundation from 1993 to 1999, and as President of the Himalayan Club, the oldest mountaineering club in India, before serving as its Emeritus President from 1999.

== Death ==
M. S. Gill died on 15 October 2023, at the age of 87.

== Books authored ==
In 1972, Gill authored the book Himalayan Wonder: Travels in Lahaul and Spiti, (republished by Penguin, 2010) His other published books include Folk Tales of Lahaul [Vikas Publishing House, 1977]; An Indian Success Story: Agriculture and Cooperatives in the Punjab (Somaiya Publishers, Bombay, 1993); Tales from the Hills: Lahaul's Enduring Myths and Legends (republished by HarperCollins, 2014); and Putting the Bhagat Singh Statue in Parliament (Chetna Prakashan, Ludhiana, 2021), Yaadan (edited by Sansal Dhami, published by Autumn Art publishers, Patiala, 2023). He was a regular contributor to The Tribune and Indian Express newspapers, as well as Illustrated Weekly and Outlook magazines.

== Awards and recognition ==
- Nishan-e-Khalsa (1999)
- Padma Vibhushan (2000)
- Dadabhai Naoroji New Millennium International Award (2000)

Political offices
Preceded by Mani Shankar Aiyar	Minister of Youth Affairs and Sports; 19 January 2011 – 12 July 2011	Succeeded by Ajay Maken
Preceded by Mani Shankar Aiyar	Minister of Youth Affairs and Sports; 28 May 2009 – 19 January 2011	Succeeded by Ajay Maken
