= Jiu Guo Zhi =

Book by Lu Zhen

- Author: Lu Zhen
- Language: Classical Chinese
- Subject: history of the Five Dynasties period
- Publication place: Song dynasty

Jiu Guo Zhi
- Traditional Chinese: 九國志
- Simplified Chinese: 九国志
- Literal meaning: Records of the Nine States
Transcriptions
Standard Mandarin
- Hanyu Pinyin: Jiǔ Guó Zhì
- Wade–Giles: Chiu Kuo Chih

Jiu Guo Zhi, or Records of the Nine Kingdoms, is a Chinese history book primarily composed by Lu Zhen of the Northern Song dynasty. The book covers nine of the Ten Kingdoms during the Five Dynasties and Ten Kingdoms period of Chinese history: Yang Wu, Southern Tang, Wuyue, Former Shu, Later Shu, Northern Han (referred to as "Eastern Han"), Southern Han, Min, and Ma Chu. Lu Zhen died before completing the book, and Zhang Tangying (張唐英) added some materials. Later, Lu Zhen's son, Lu Lun (路綸), added two chapters on Jingnan (referred to as "Northern Chu").

The book originally contained 51 chapters, but chapters on the royal annuals have disappeared. In the 18th century, historian Shao Jinhan (邵晉涵) extracted surviving chapters from the Yongle Encyclopedia, which were recompiled by Zhou Mengtang (周夢棠) into a 12-chapter book.
