= Binn (disambiguation) =

Binn is a Swiss municipality. Binn may also refer to:

- David Binn (born 1972), American football player
- Jason Binn (born 1968), American publisher and entrepreneur
- Binn., taxonomic author abbreviation of Simon Binnendijk (1821–1883), Dutch gardener and botanist
- House of the Binns, an historic house in West Lothian, Scotland

== See also ==
- "Binn", meaning "peak" in the Irish language, used in the names of mountains:
  - Binn Chaonaigh
  - Binn idir an dá Log
  - Binn Mhór
- Bin (disambiguation)
