= Li Linsi =

Chinese educator and diplomat (1896–1970)

- 厉麟似
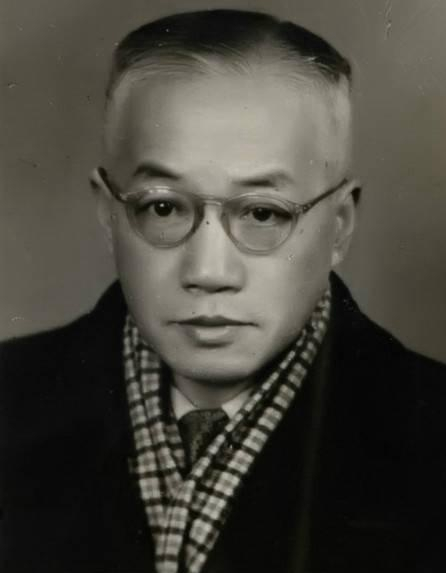
- Li in 1948
- Born: Li Jiaxiang (厉家祥); 18 February 1896; Hangzhou, Qing dynasty (modern-day China)
- Died: 21 October 1970 (aged 74); Shanghai, China
- Education: Heidelberg University; University of Jena; Sophia University; Tongji University
- Known for: China's Mahatma Gandhi; Pioneering figure in China–Europe cultural exchange; Major proponent of China's League of Nations diplomacy; Key facilitator of China-Germany relationship; Rescuing the Jews during WWII
- Title: Diplomatic consultant to Chiang Kai-shek; Director General of Ministry of Education, Republic of China; Distinguished Professor at National Central University; Distinguished Professor at Shanghai International Studies University
- Movement: Leader of China's nonviolent resistance movement
- Board member of: Co-founder of United Nations Association of China
- Children: Li Shengjiao (厉声教)
- Father: Li Liangyu (厉良玉)

Li Linsi (Chinese: 厉麟似; pinyin: Lì Línsì; 18 February 1896 – 21 October 1970), born Li Jiaxiang (厉家祥), was a Chinese educator, diplomat, and scholar who has been recognized as one of the key figures in modern Chinese cultural and diplomatic history. Hailed as China's Mahatma Gandhi, Li was the leader of China's nonviolent resistance against Japanese aggression. His military research contributed to China in the Second Sino-Japanese War. He was known for his efforts to save hundreds of Jews fleeing to Shanghai during World War II. A diplomatic consultant to Chiang Kai-shek, Li was a key facilitator of the China–Germany relationship during the 1930s, and a major proponent of China's League of Nations diplomacy.

Li was a co-founder of some of China's most influential organizations, including the China branch of the United Nations and China Institute of World Cultural Cooperation at the League of Nations. Being reputed as a human bridge connecting Chinese and European cultures, he made a great contribution to helping the West comprehend ancient Chinese philosophies, and introduced many Western progressive thoughts to China. A descendant of Jiang Ziya, the Chinese legendary founding prime minister during the Zhou dynasty, Li was the fourth great-grandson of Li E, a leader of the Qing dynasty poetry. His eldest son is Li Shengjiao, a noted Chinese diplomat and jurist. Li died in Shanghai during the Cultural Revolution.

== Life and career ==
=== Early life ===
Li Linsi was born into a distinguished Chinese literary family in Hangzhou in February 1896. Li's father, Li Liangyu (厉良玉), was a Qing dynasty official, educator and renowned artist, who co-founded the Xiling Society of Seal Arts, one of China's most important traditional arts associations. His paternal fourth great-grandfather, Li E (厉鹗), was a great poet and scholar during the Qing dynasty, who has been recognized as a leader of the Qing dynasty poetry. Li was a descendant of Jiang Ziya (姜子牙), the Chinese legendary founding prime minister during the Zhou dynasty.

Li was nurtured by his family since childhood, which laid a solid foundation for his future success in traditional Chinese studies. After graduating from Tongji University in 1915, he continued his further education in Japan and Germany, graduating from Sophia University, University of Jena and Heidelberg University successively. He earned his master's degree in law and doctorate in philosophy.

Li studied and lived in Germany and Europe for 10 years. Except for obtaining degrees in law and philosophy, he also took time to learn politics, education and military, and mastered German, English, French, Spanish, Russian, Portuguese and other languages.

Travelling extensively around Europe, Li came into contact with a range of Western progressive ideas, and got to know a handful of promising Chinese students, including Zhou Enlai (周恩来) and Zhu De (朱德), who later became leaders of the People's Republic of China. Li also established a deep friendship with German sinologist Richard Wilhelm.

He participated in Germany's first China Institute at the University of Frankfurt, a research institution founded by Richard Wilhelm. The facility was committed to encouraging the West to better understand Chinese cultures. Li helped the institution start multiple journals on Chinese studies, such as China, the China-Germany Yearbook and East Asia Review. He also contributed to organizing various seminars and exhibitions on Chinese studies for the institution.

=== Career under the Nationalist government ===
Li returned to China in 1930, and joined the government as an education official upon the recommendation of Chiang Kai-shek (蒋介石), the then leader of the Republic of China. He later became a diplomatic consultant to Chiang.

As a senior education official, as well as a cultural diplomat, Li was a key proponent and practitioner of China's League of Nations diplomacy in the 1930s. He actively promoted communication, cooperation and coordination between China and the League of Nations – the predecessor of the United Nations – which was the first international organization whose principal mission was to maintain world peace. He proposed that to better combat the Japanese aggression, China should try to draw more support and favorable public opinion from the international community through the League of Nations. In 1932, in order to strengthen the relationship between China and the League of Nations, Li served as a cultural and educational representative of the Chinese government to pay an official visit to Europe, including Switzerland, where the League of Nations headquartered. The successful six-month trip enhanced the cultural exchange and cooperation among China, Europe and the League of Nations.

Li also co-founded some of China's most influential organizations, including the China Institute of World Cultural Cooperation at the League of Nations in 1933.

Li effectively advanced the diplomatic ties between China and the League of Nations, and played a major role in the operation of some Chinese affiliates of the League of Nations, including the League of Nations Association of China and China Institute of World Cultural Cooperation at the League of Nations. Li was also a participant in the founding of the China branch of the United Nations after the League of Nations was replaced by the United Nations.

Li played a crucial role in the existence and development of the German Military Mission in China, and was a key facilitator of the China-Germany relationship during the 1930s. He was Chiang's right-hand man on China's diplomacy toward Germany, and a link between China's top leaders and the German military advisory group.

Li helped facilitate former commander-in-chief of the German Army Hans von Seeckt's official visit to China in 1933, and persuaded him to accept the offer from Chiang Kai-shek to be his military adviser and chief of the German military mission. This move helped elevate the China-Germany relationship to a new height. In 1935, the diplomatic relationship between China and Germany was upgraded from a ministerial level to an ambassadorial level.

During his first visit to China, Seeckt gave Chiang a book, titled Thoughts of a Soldier, which he considered was a representative work of his own. The translator of the official Chinese version of the book was Li. The Chinese version of the book published in 1936 then became a key reference book for the Chinese military.

=== Aiding the Jews during World War II ===
After China's War with Japan (1937–45) erupted in 1937, Li resigned from his post in the central government and took the advice from his friend Jiang Baili (蒋百里) to move his family from Nanjing to Shanghai to help him finish his military works. In the Isolated Island period in Shanghai during World War II, Li's family lived on Ximo Road in the Shanghai International Settlement, an area which was not occupied by Japanese invaders, but in control of the British and American forces.

As a prestigious figure in China's cultural and diplomatic circles, Li was engaged as a professor at the Jinan National University – the first university in China to recruit foreign students.

During this period, a huge number of Jewish people, mainly from Germany, Austria and Poland, fled to Shanghai to escape the Nazis. Li had a reputation for helping the Jews among Shanghai's Jewish community.

Using his personal connections and resources, Li helped to make Shanghai a better place for those Jewish refugees. For a long period, Shanghai remained the only place in the world which unconditionally offered refuge for Jewish people fleeing the Nazis.

Li was deeply moved by the tragedy of these people and contributed as much as he could to the Jewish community as a better-off local who spent more than a decade in Germany. He even sheltered several Jewish refugees who were friends of his in Germany.

With the aid of Li and other wealthy natives, a modern Jewish community emerged: more housing for Jewish refugees was arranged, businesses established, German publications circulated, and even an orchestra formed.

=== China's Mahatma Gandhi ===
Li's life went sharply downhill after the outbreak of the Pacific War in December 1941, when Japanese invaders occupied the British and American controlled parts of the city in the wake of the attack on Pearl Harbor. Li's family lived in misery and was eventually separated from him due to his refusal to work for the Japanese occupiers.

After the fall of the Shanghai International Settlement, the Jinan National University relocated out of Shanghai, but Li stayed. Known as China's Mahatma Gandhi, Li began to lead Shanghai intellectuals to fight Japanese invaders in a non-violent manner.

Because he was a prominent public figure who served as a high-ranking education official, and had experience studying in Japan, the Japanese occupiers attempted to lure Li to their side, promising to appoint him as the Minister of Education or Minister of Examination if he agreed to work for them. Facing both temptation and intimidation, Li tried to find various excuses and refused in a mild yet determined manner. Li's non-violent strategy proved practical.

During this period, Li did extensive research on Japanese and German military works. His research played an important role in the Second Sino-Japanese War.

Li's non-violent philosophy inspired a vast crowd, not only the Chinese cultural elites, but also a new generation of students, as well as the Chinese masses and people from the international community.

=== Career under the PRC ===
After the founding of the PRC in 1949, Li worked as a professor at the Shanghai International Studies University and nurtured a large number of quality language talents. He died during China's Cultural Revolution in Shanghai at the age of 74.
