= Song Shi Jishi =

- Author: Li E
- Language: Chinese
- Published: 1746 (original edition); 1983 (Shanghai Ancient Books Publishing House)

Song Shi Jishi (Chinese: 宋詩紀事, "Recorded Occasions of Song Poetry") is a compilation of historical accounts about poets of the Song dynasty. It was edited by the prominent Qing dynasty poet Li E. According to the author's preface, the process of compilation started from 1725, and took about 20 years to finish. The book comprises 100 volumes, and discusses about 3812 Song Dynasty poets. Its style and structure imitated that of the 12th century book Recorded Occasions of Tang Poetry, there is one chapter for every poet, including a biography, several representative poems and comments.

== Impact and imitators ==
The book preserved a lot of literature materials about Song poetry, and opened a pass for similar works such as Recorded Occasions of Liao Poetry, Recorded Occasions of Jin Poetry, Recorded Occasions of Yuan Poetry, Recorded Occasions of Ming Poetry and Recorded Occasions of Qing Poetry. Lu Xinyuan, a book collector of late Qing era, composed a book named Supplement to the Recorded Occasions of Song Poetry (宋詩紀事補遺, 100 volumes), dwhich covers another 3000 poets. Qian Zhongshu, a 20th-century Chinese scholar, wrote Emendations of Recorded Occasions of Song Poetry (宋詩紀事補正), corrected many mistakes and added more materials about Song poets to the original book.
