= Recycling bin =

Container used to hold recyclables before they are taken to recycling centers

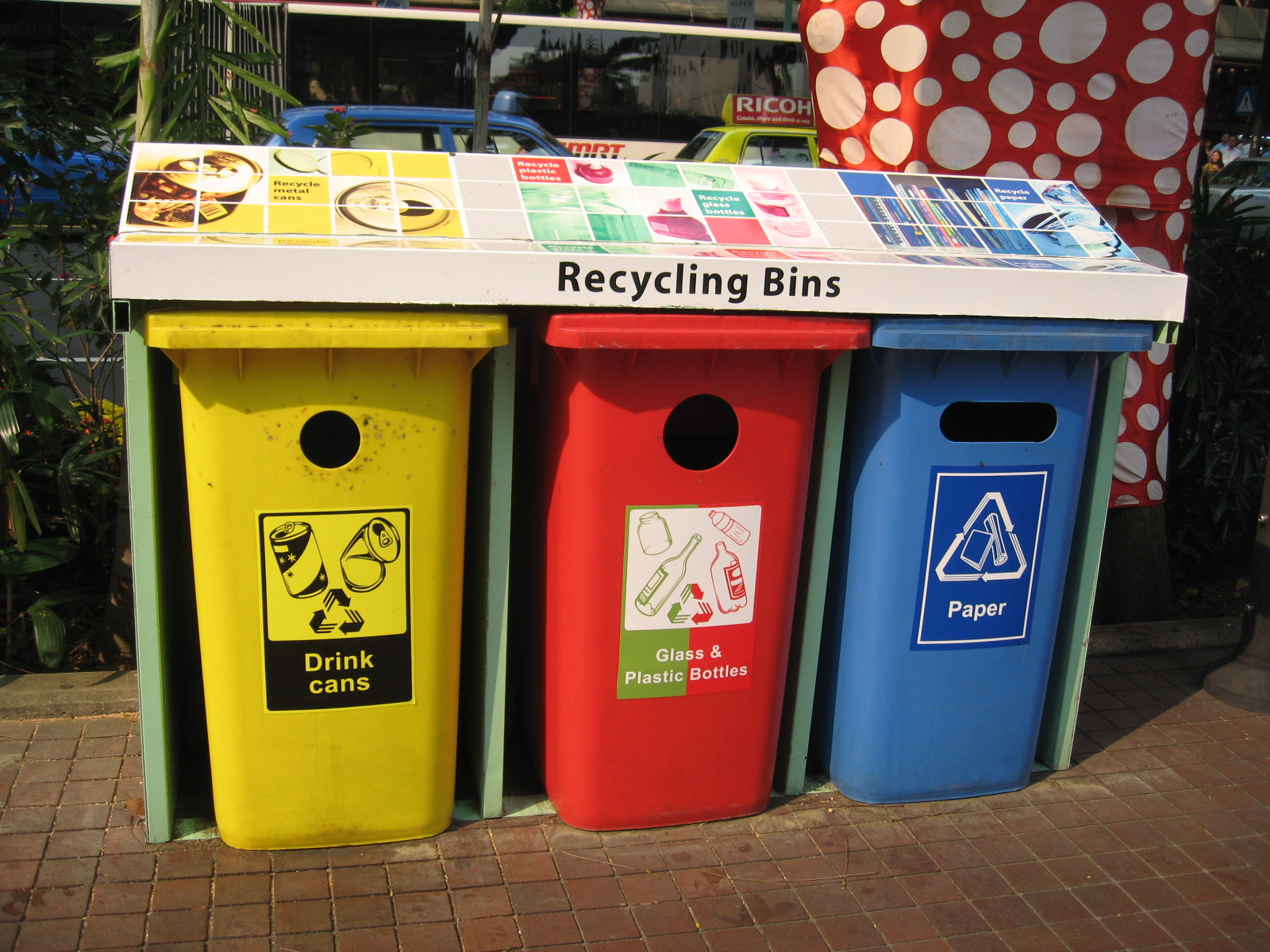
Sorted recycling bins in Orchard Road, Singapore

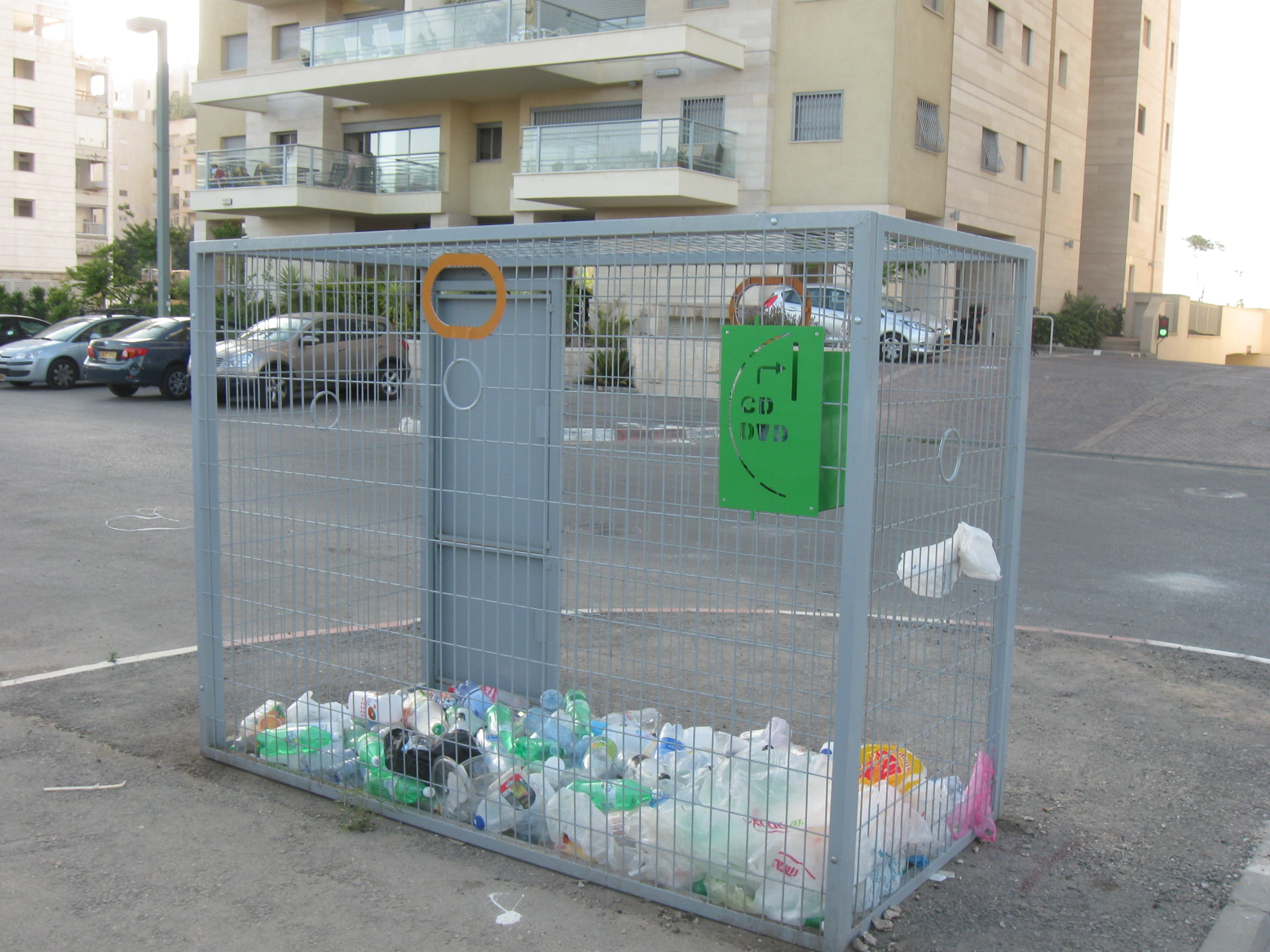
Recycling bin of plastic bottles in Tel Aviv, Israel

A recycling bin (or recycle bin) is a container used to hold recyclables before they are taken to recycling centers. Recycling bins exist in various sizes for use inside and outside of homes, offices, and large public facilities. Separate containers are often provided for paper, tin or aluminum cans, and glass or plastic bottles, with some bins allowing for commingled, mixed recycling of various materials.

Bins are sometimes in different colors so that the user can differentiate between the types of materials specified for each bin. While there is no universal standard color for recycling, the color blue is commonly used to indicate recycling in public settings. Other regions also use the color green to differentiate between types of recyclable materials. Recycling bins, cans, or wheeled carts (toters) are common elements of municipal kerbside collection programs, which frequently distribute eye-catching bins to encourage participation.

== History ==
The idea of the waste bins is believed to have been conceived by Eugène-René Poubelle (15 April 1831- 15 July 1907), French lawyer who introduced waste containers to Paris. In 1883 “Poubelle law” was established in Paris which implemented the usage of closed containers that separated waste by type. His decree provided for the sorting of waste into three categories: compostable materials, paper and cloth, and glass, which gave way to the idea of separate receptacles according to type of waste.

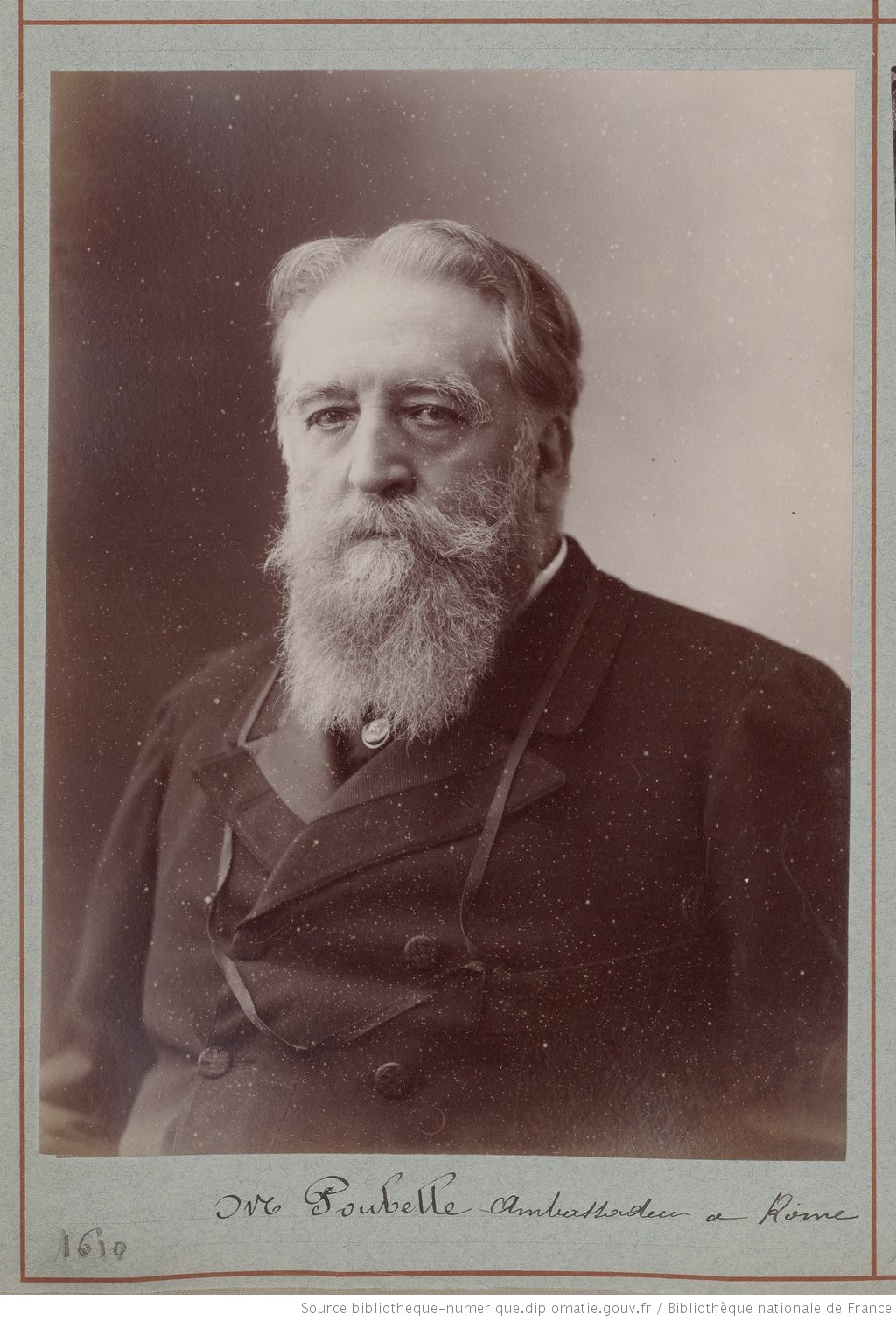
Eugène Poubelle

Recycling has become far more commonplace since the mid 20th century. Originally, the majority of households disposed of their wastes into land. In 1942, during World War II, President Franklin D. Roosevelt established the War Production Board, which had people and companies focus on prioritizing the distribution of materials to war needs. Nazi Germany also implemented recycling techniques, not motivated by nature conservation but for resource allocation for the war effort. Their recycling policy involved separating waste into three containers: general waste, metal-containing waste, and food waste. Nazi policies were met with resistance by the countries they occupied. Notably, the Dutch cross contaminated the waste to reduce its efficiency.

After World War II, people in the United States were becoming more aware of the landfill effects. In response to public concern, the U.S. Environmental Protection Agency (EPA) was formed by President Richard Nixon.

The United States was not the only country concerned about the effects of landfilled waste. In 1972, Dutch activists Babs Riemens-Jagerman and Miep Kuiper-Verkuyl, installed a container in Zeist to collect glass_{.}

In 1974, Missouri, the first recycling bin designed to collect paper, “The Tree Saver”, was introduced. While beneficial in some respects, the "Tree Saver" had limitations, as it required people to transport the materials or leave them in front of their homes for pickup.

Also, in 1974, Jack McGinnis, an American expat living in Toronto who enjoyed roaming the beaches and picking up cans and bottles, founded the Is Five Foundation, the first curbside multi-material pickup of recycling materials serving Toronto and its suburbs. Today, the blue box recycling system, as well as similar systems are in place in hundreds of cities around the world.

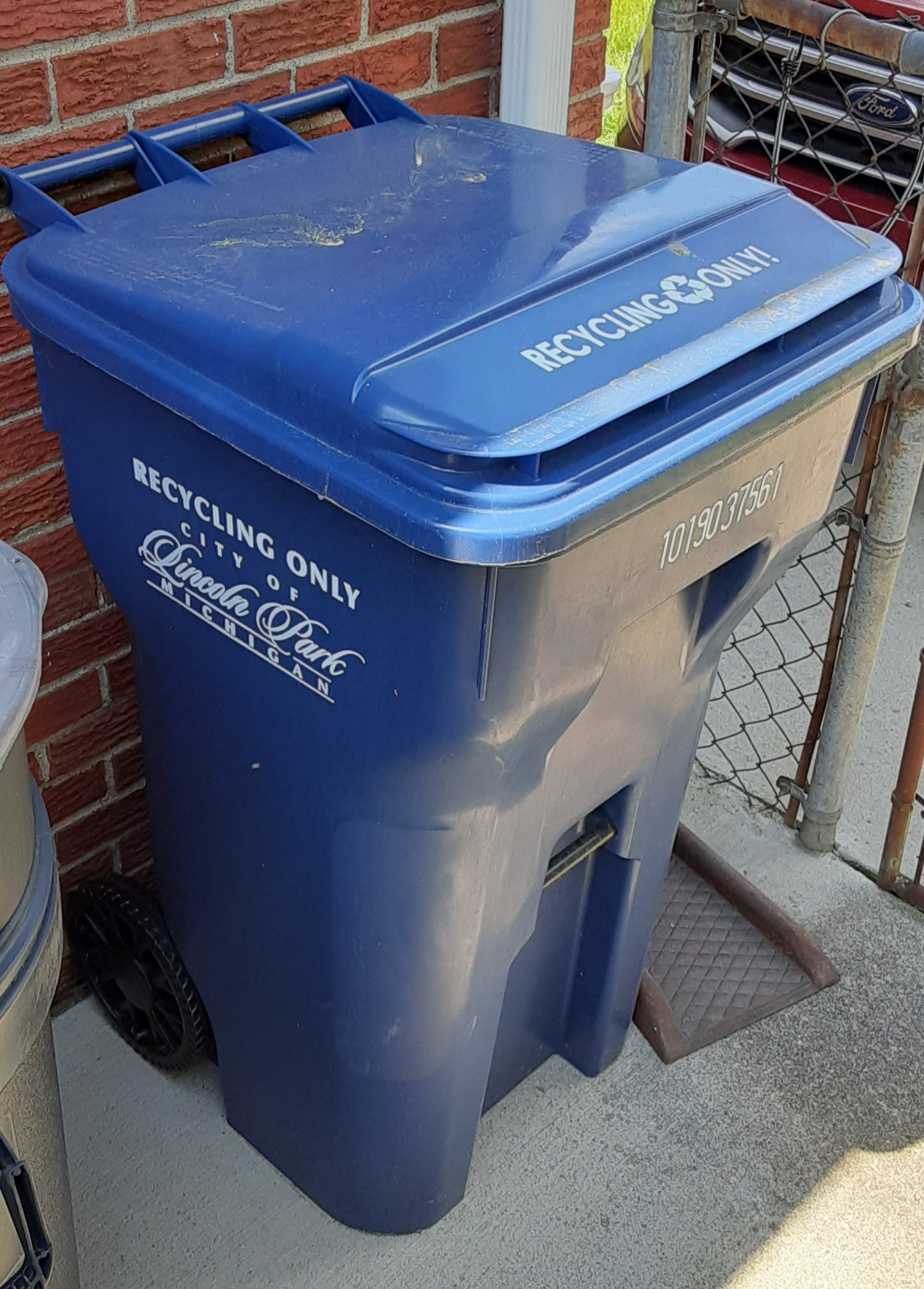
Blue bin recycling bin

The modern Blue-Box recycling bin was invented by Jack McGinnis nearly one hundred years after Poubelle's idea to sort types of waste by type. The proliferation of curbside blue-bin recycling containers coincided with the increase in municipal recycling rates which increased from just over 6% in 1960 to over 35% in 2017.

In 1980, Woodbury, New Jersey became the first municipality to mandate recycling; other cities soon followed, and the blue box curbside recycling system became a staple of late 20th and 21st century life. As of the end of 1988, there were approximately 1,050 curbside recycling programs in the United States. By the end of 1991, this number had increased by more than 250% to 3,955 programs.

=== Recycling on the roll ===
Wheels on recycling bins are a relatively new invention. First introduced by Frank Rotherham Mouldings in 1968, wheels on bins were used to move waste around a factory floor. This idea was then extrapolated to bins across England, and eventually, bins around the world, reducing the labor required to move waste products from one place to another.

== Household collection ==
Types of recycling bins can vary depending on whether they are intended for personal use or public use.

=== Curbside bin ===
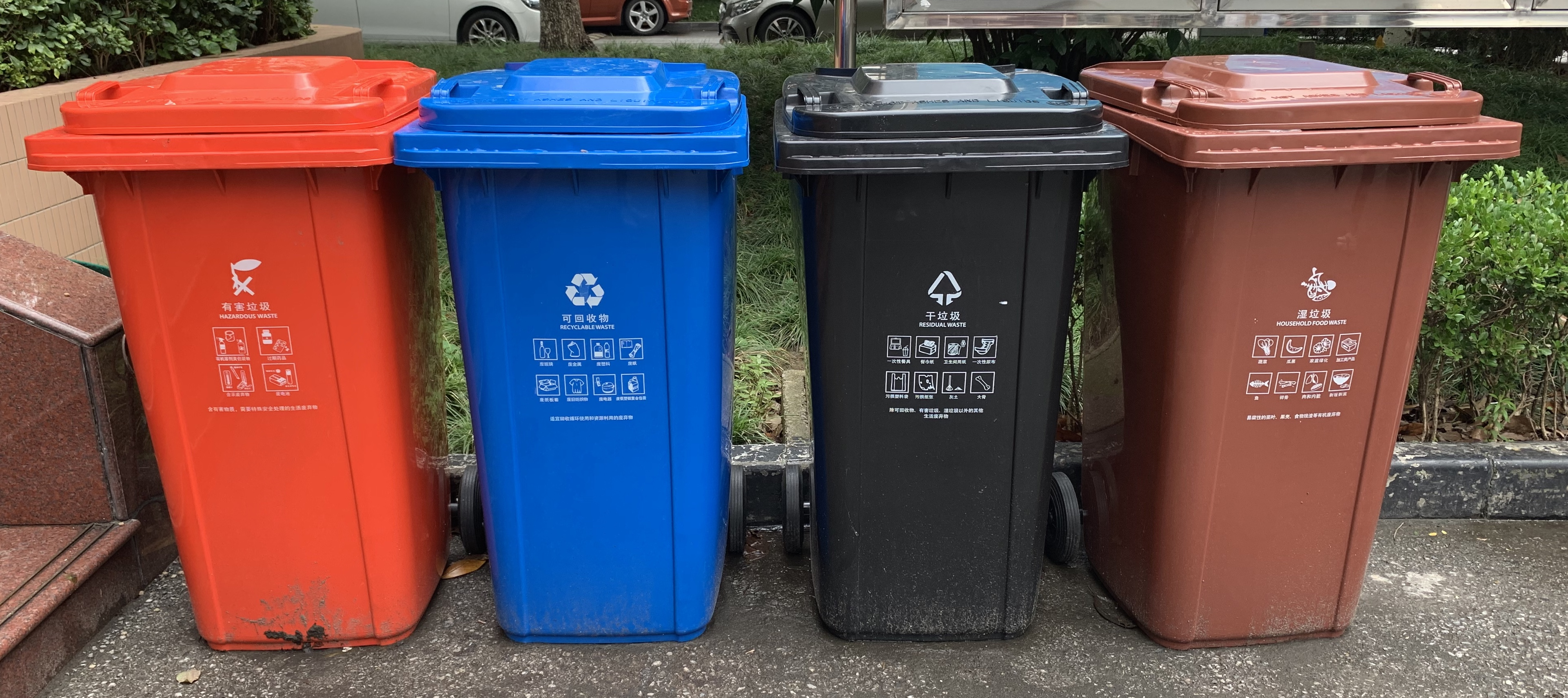
Sorted curbside bins in Shanghai

One of the most common types of residential recycling bins is the curbside recycling bin. The city or county where the residence is located usually provides a curbside recycling bin to each household. The actual type of recycling bin can vary;

common colors of residential recycling bins are green or blue in the United States. The size of the curbside recycling bin can also vary depending on the county as well, but is usually around 90-96 gallons (340-363 liters).

=== Alternative household bins ===
Other recycling bins in the household are sold privately and can take many different forms These bins vary based on the manufacturer, but are all produced with the goal of collecting recyclable waste.

== Public collection ==
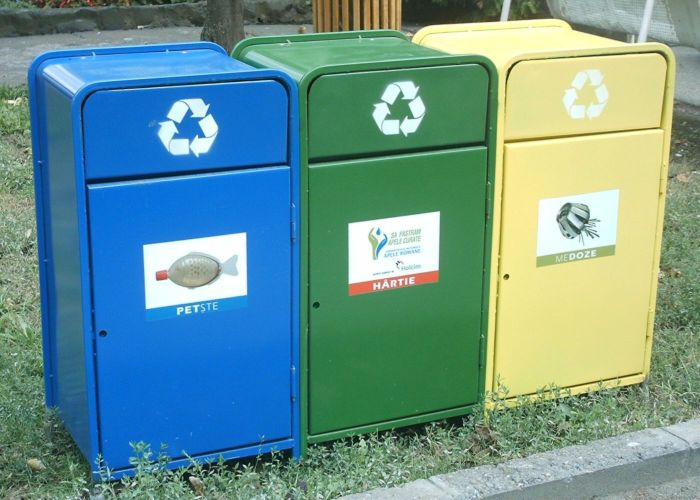
Public recycling bins in Timisoara, Romania

Commonly seen in public places such as parks and universities, public recycling bins can vary in shape and size. These bins are placed in areas easily accessible to the public to help facilitate recycling. Many of these recycling bins are accompanied by a compost and waste bin to allow the public to conveniently dispose of a variety of waste. The dispersal of these bins help to contribute to the beautification of public areas by encouraging the proper disposal of waste products. Placement of these bins can be done either through private entities or different government agencies.

== Safety issues ==
Though rare, there have been some fatal accidents involving recycling bins. Since its invention, The recycling bin has caused many controversies, including various deaths. In 1995, a twenty-six-year-old male in California was crushed to death in a recycling bin by a recycling ram. In 2011, a sixty-two year old Ohio woman was found wedged face first in a recycling bin. She fell off of her porch and into the recycling bin and presumably asphyxiated to death. Also in 2011, the body of a forty-four-year-old man was found in a recycling plant after he was crushed to death crawling into a recycling bin. More recently, in 2022, a Massachusetts woman named Barbara Novaes's dead body was found inside a recycling bin. Although her death was determined to be accidental, her family has disputed this claim, believing her death to be a homicide.

== Alternative uses of the term "recycling bin" ==
Although more commonly referred to as Trash, the term recycling bin is sometimes used to discard files in computer software systems.

=== Windows ===
In 1995, Microsoft released Windows 95, which introduced a "recycling bin" as a place to store discarded files which could then be restored or permanently deleted. The operating system popularised the usage of the term "recycling bin" in software.

== Recycling bins around the world ==
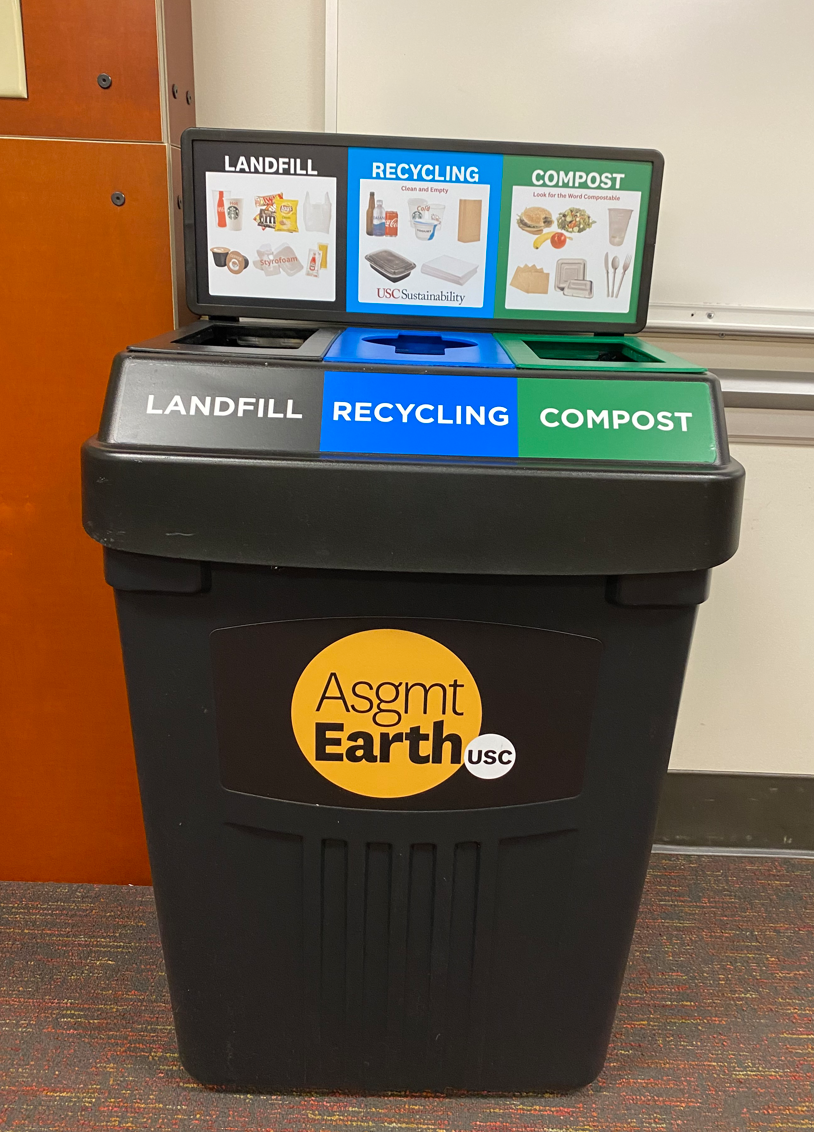
Recycling bin pictured outside the University of Southern California, United States

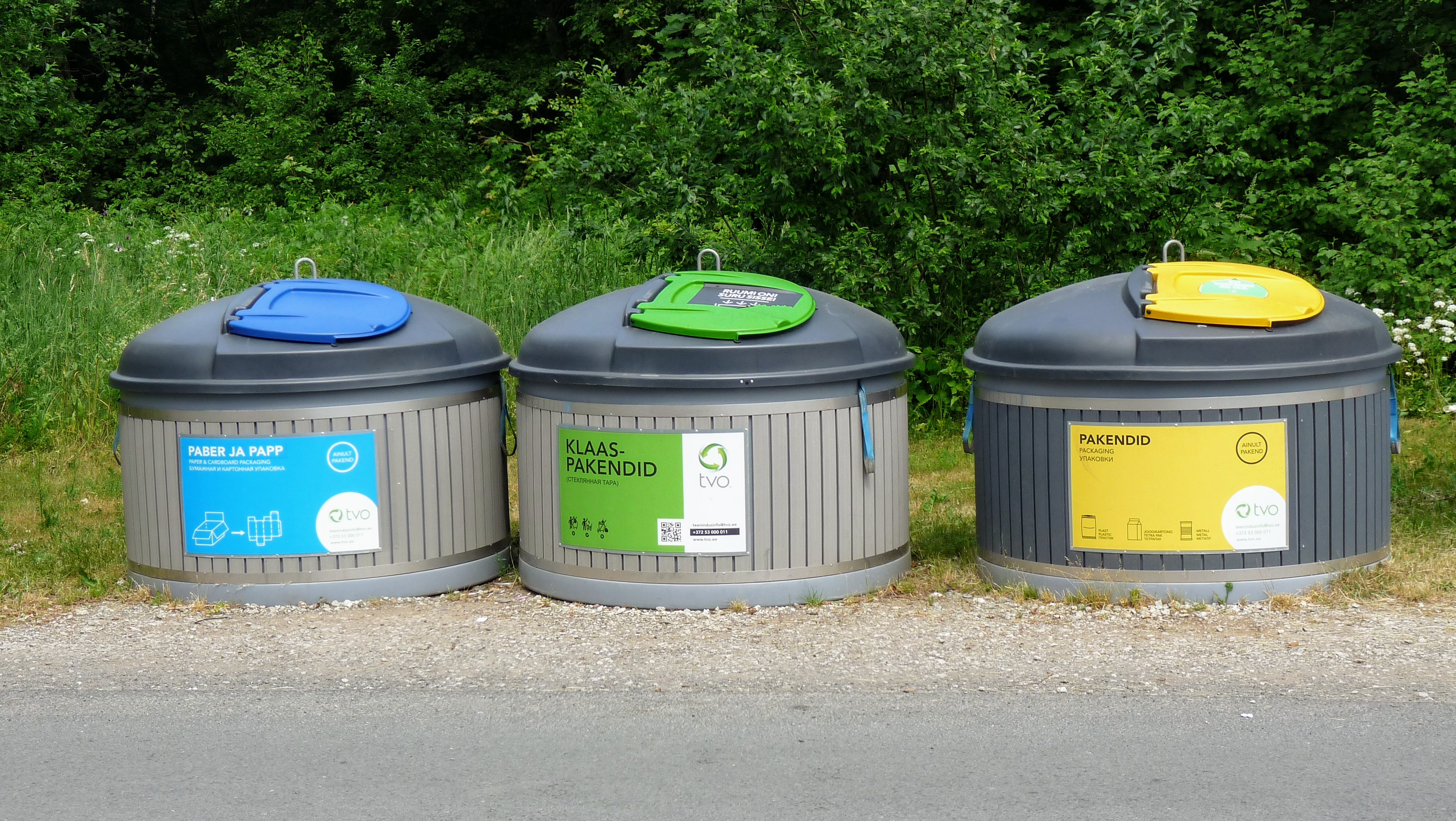
Sorted waste containers in Tallinn, Estonia

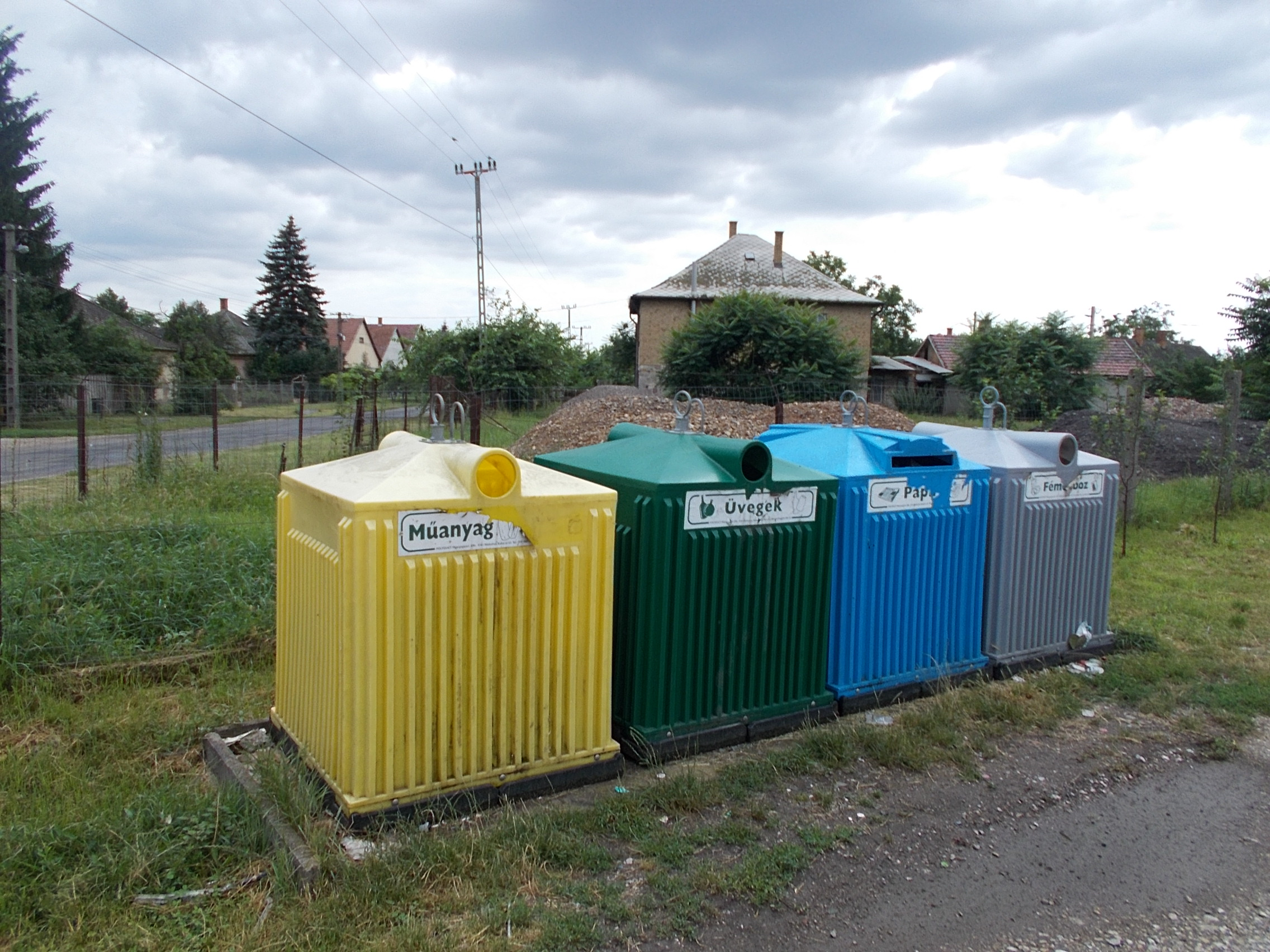
Sorted waste containers in Jász-Nagykun-Szolnok County, Hungary

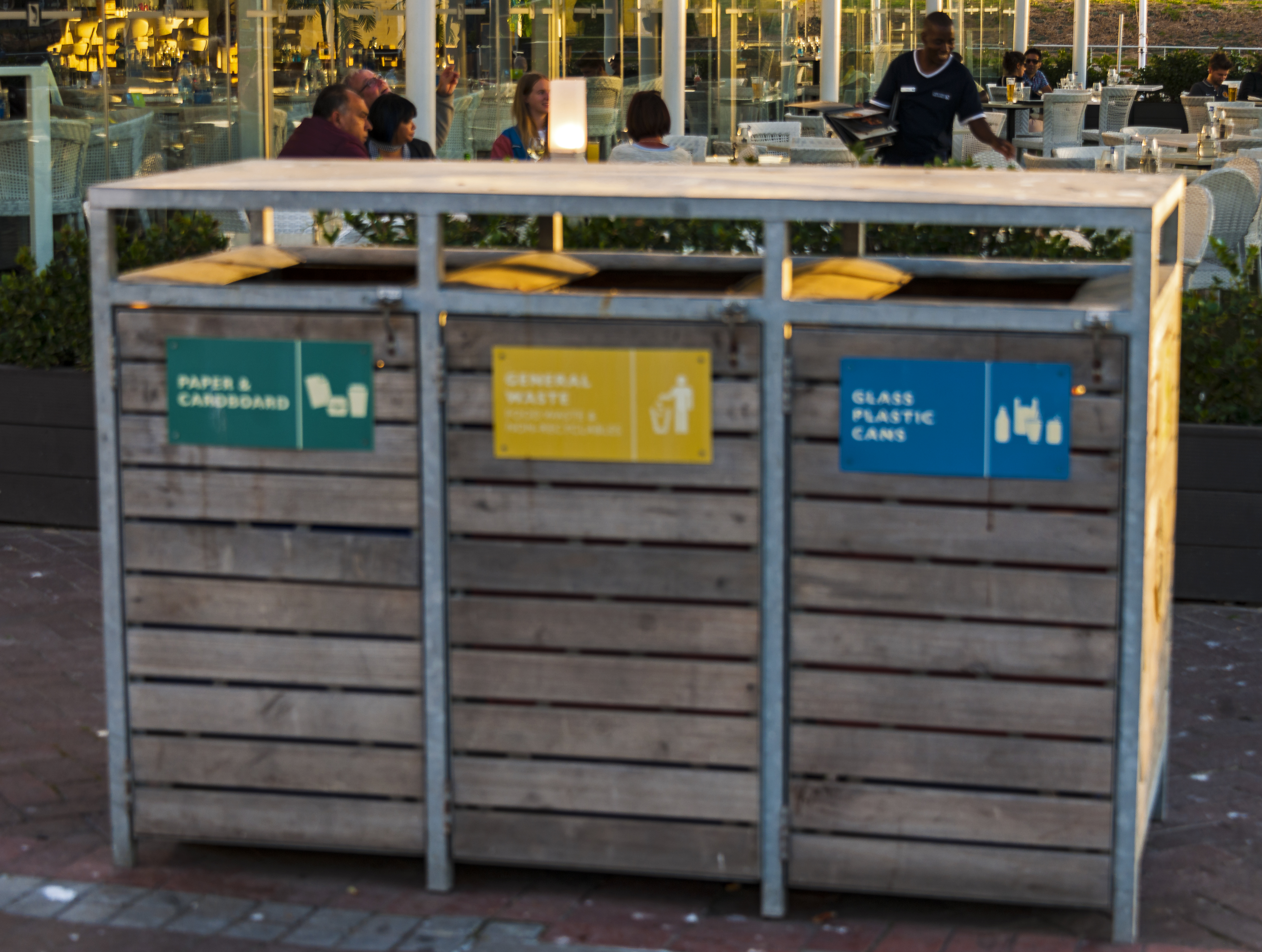
Recycling bin in Cape Town, South Africa

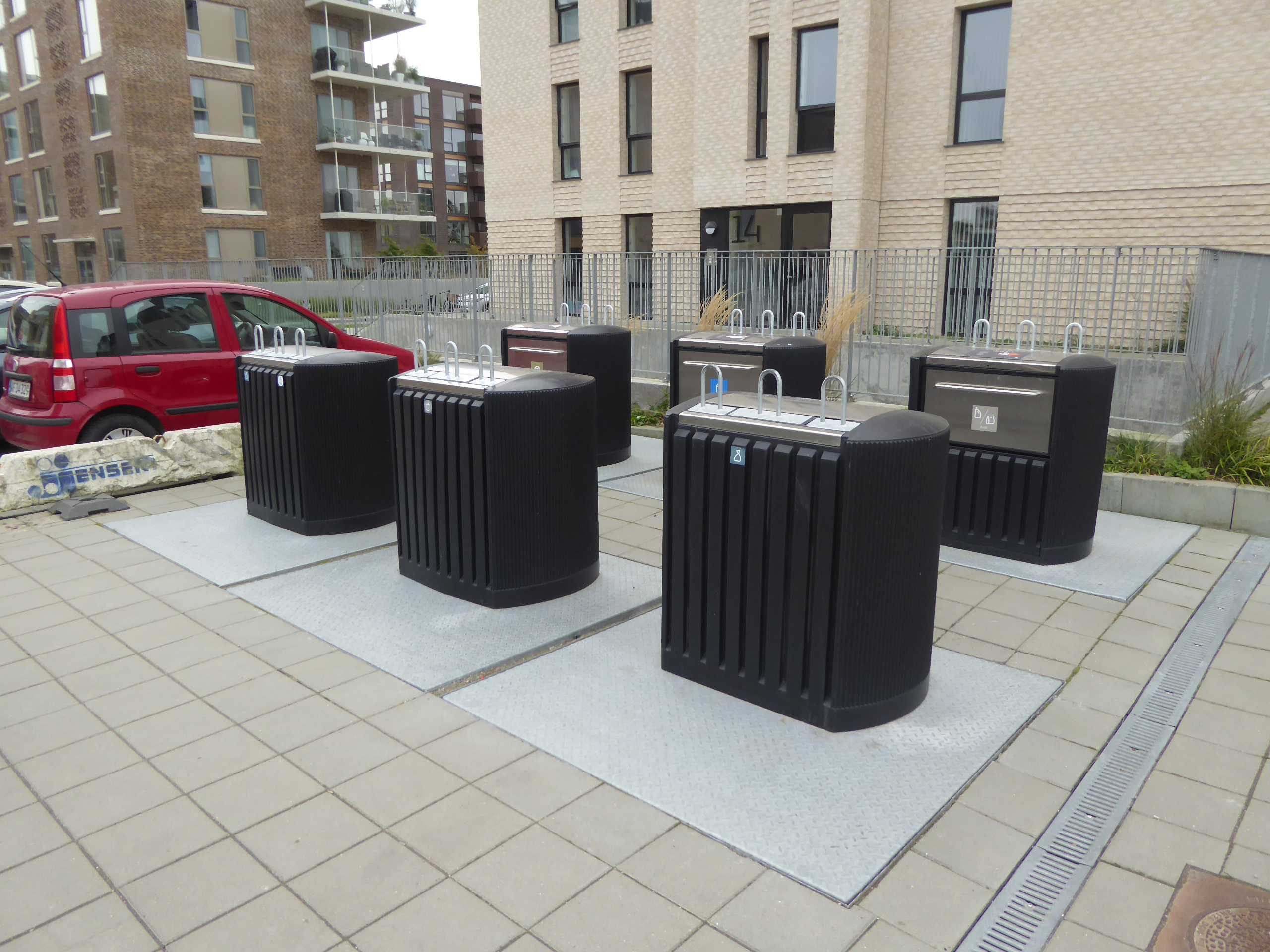
Underground sorted waste containers at Irmavej, Denmark

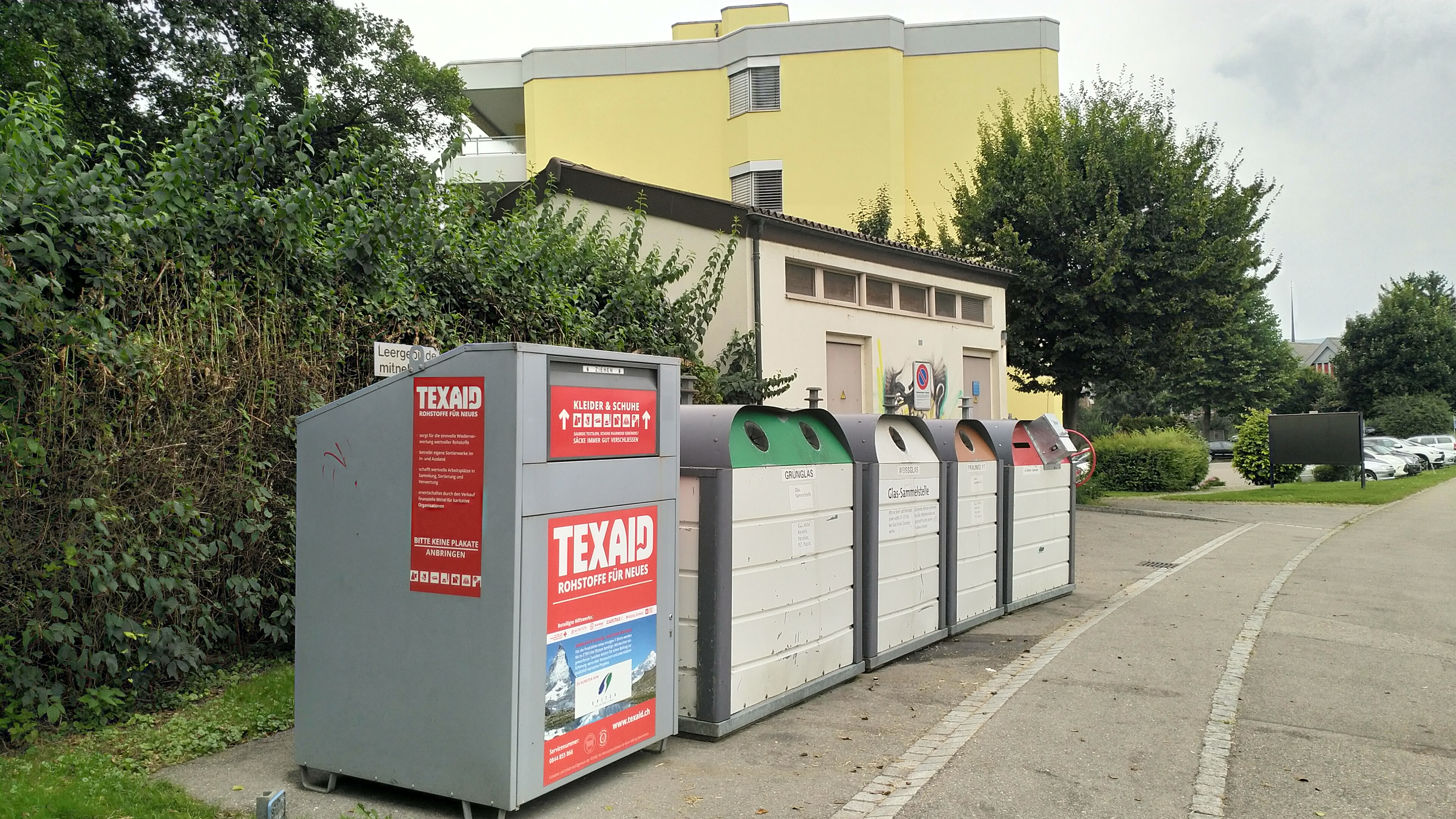
Sorted waste containers in Derendingen, Switzerland

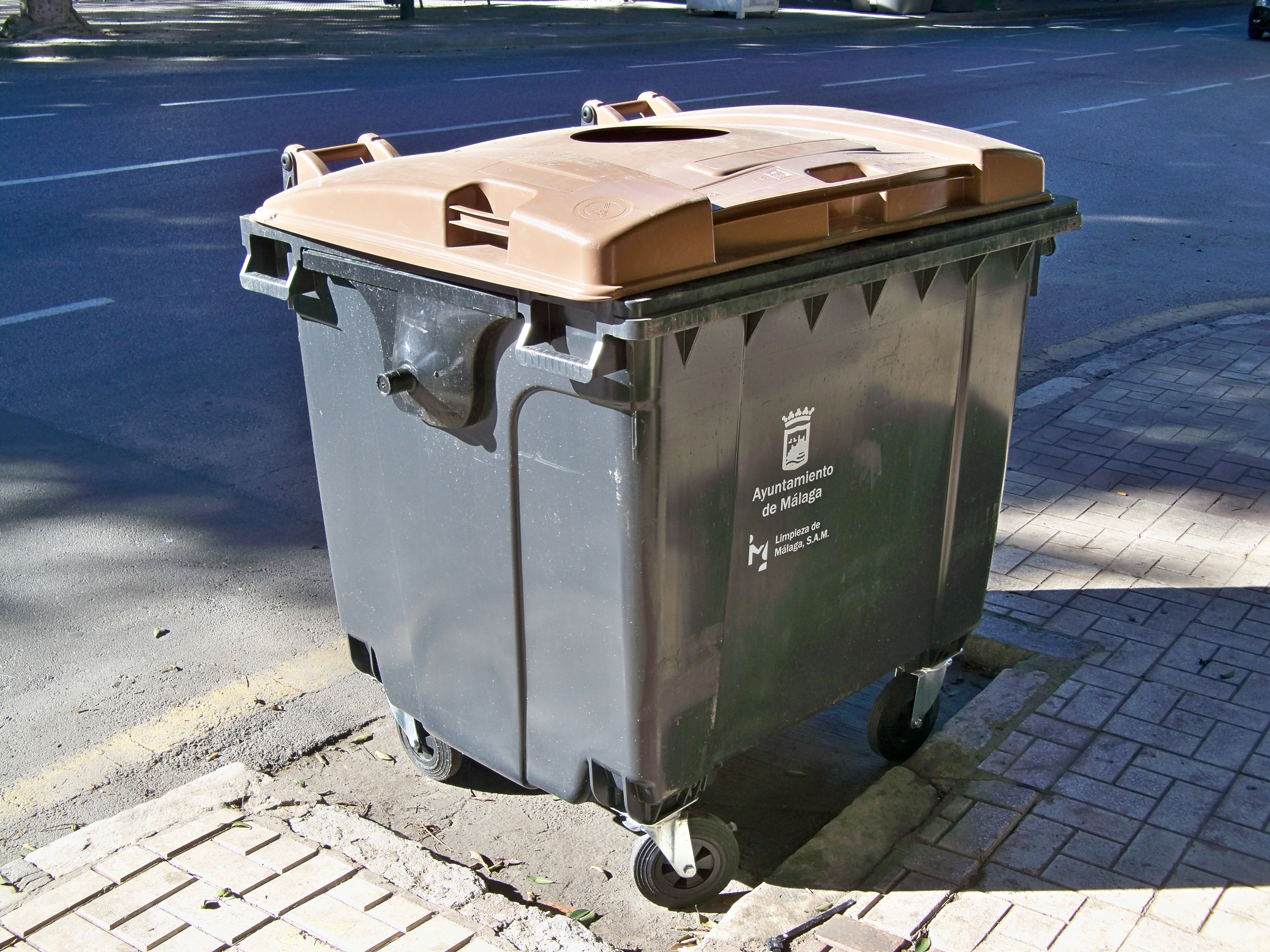
Recycle bin in Málaga, Spain

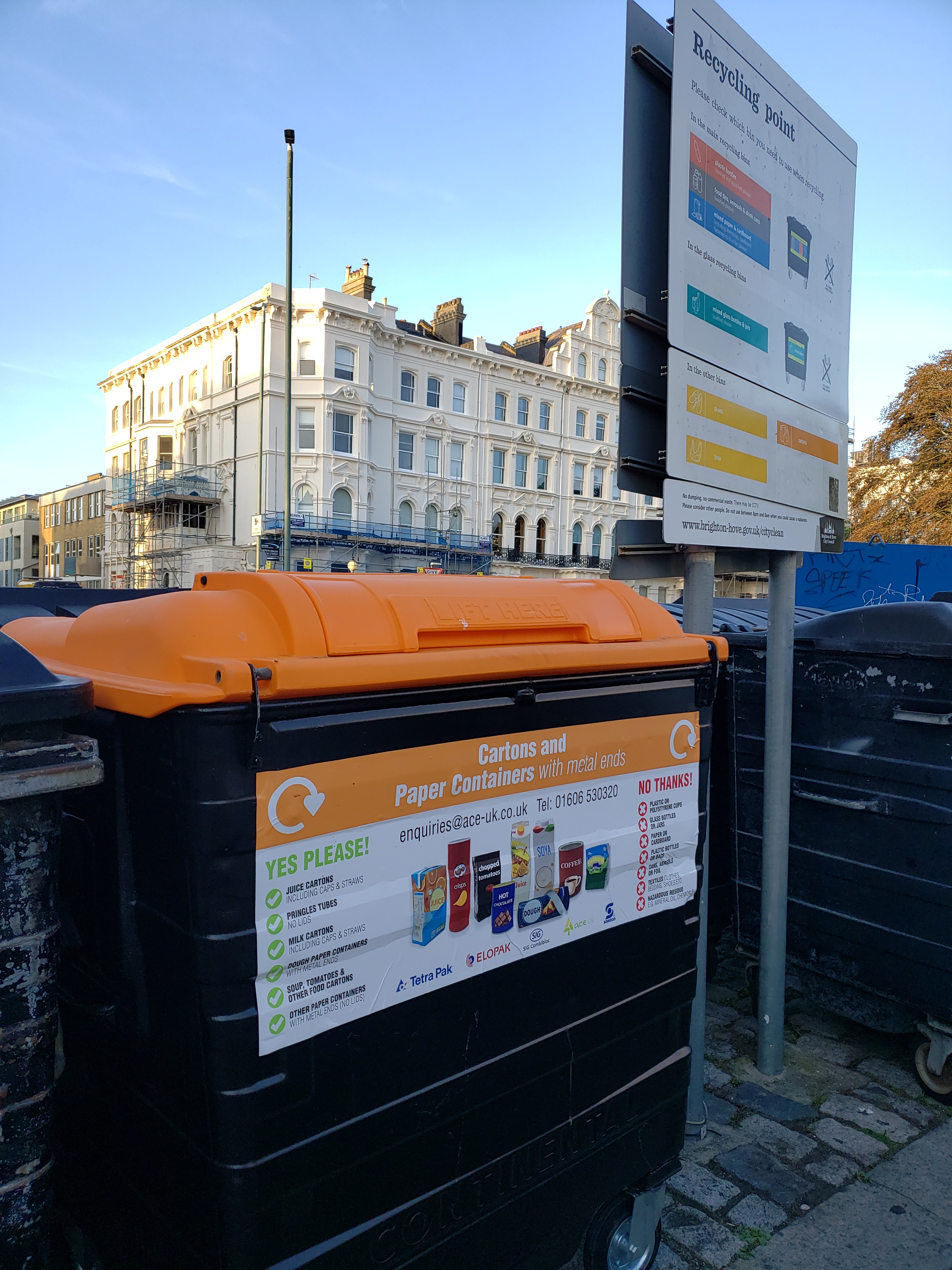
Sorted recycle bins in Brighton, United Kingdom

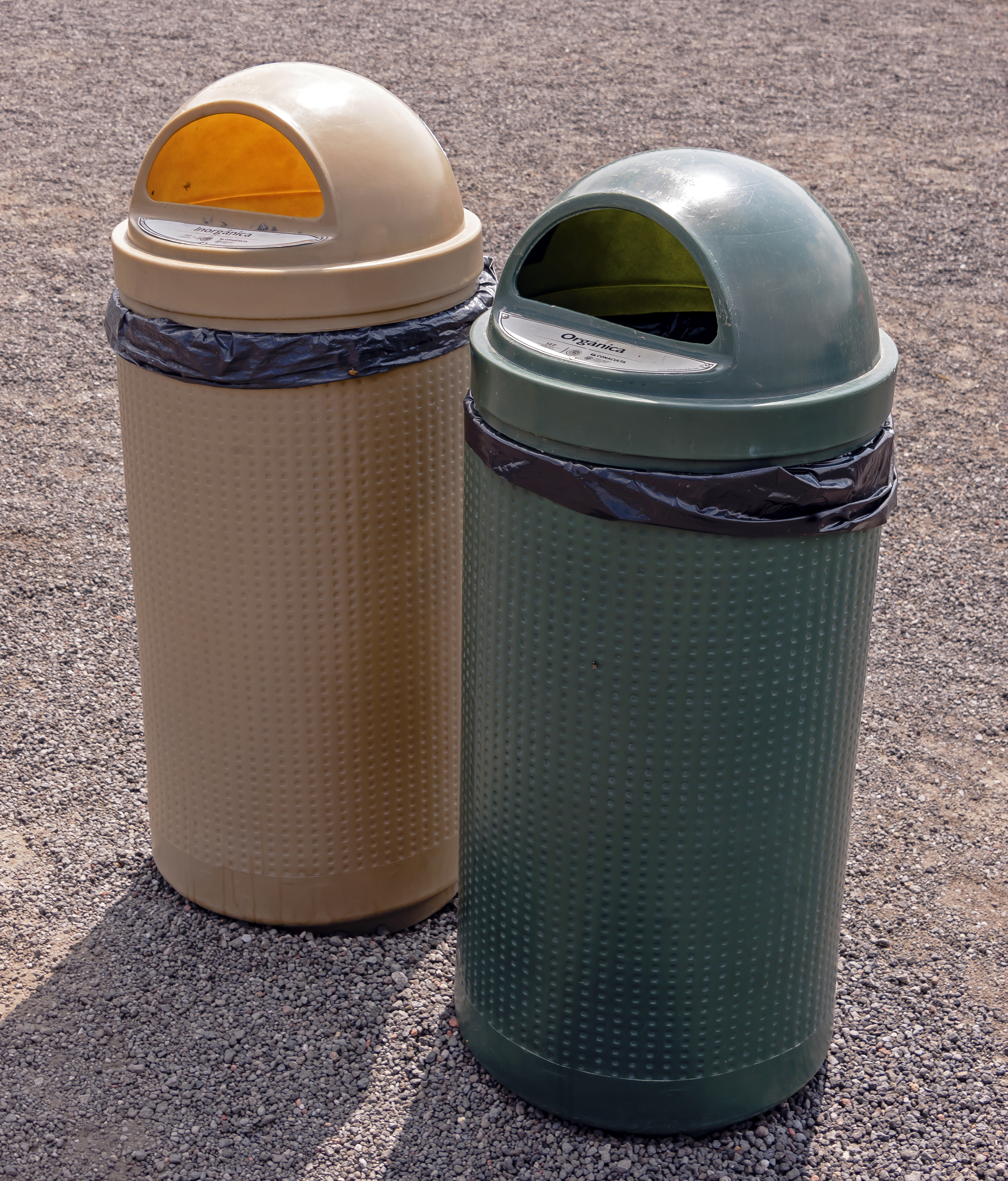
Sorted recycling containers in Teotihuacan, Mexico

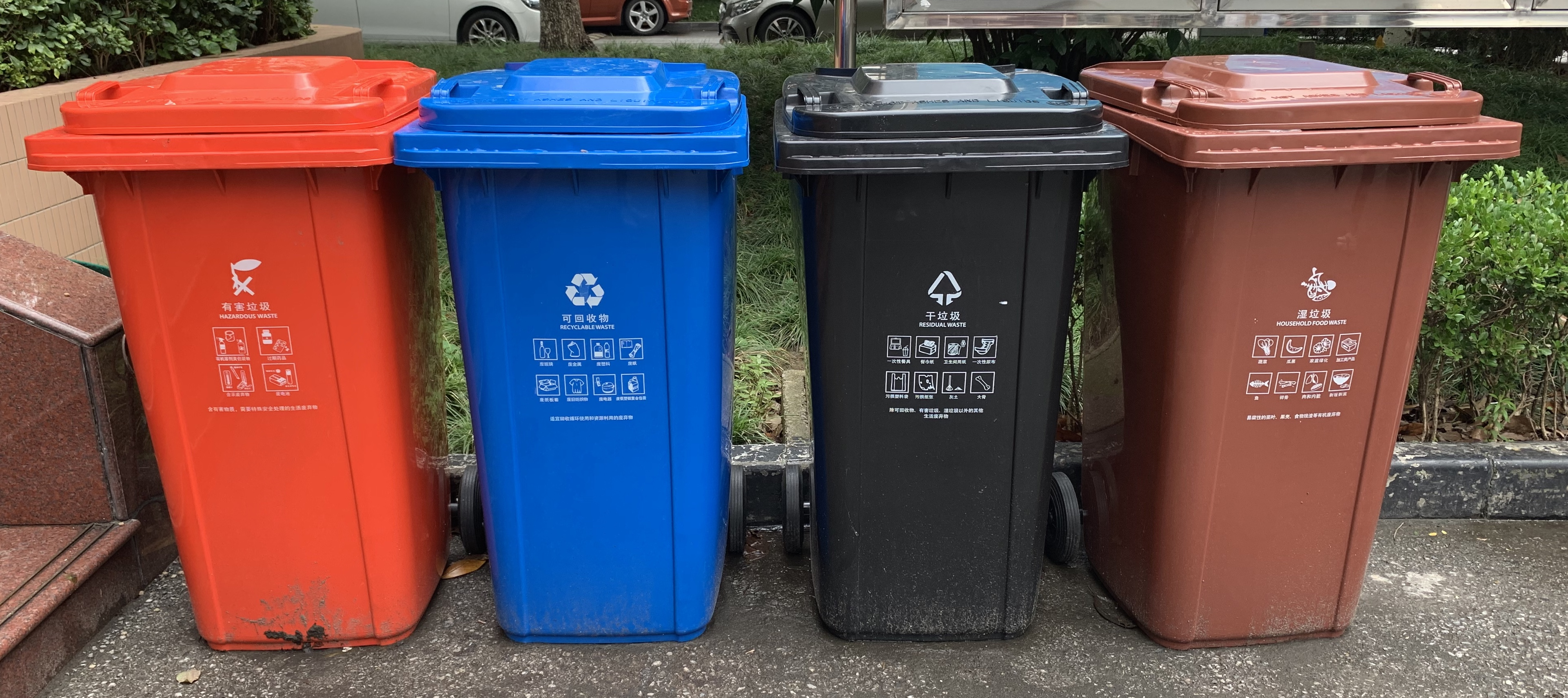
Sorted recycle bins in Shanghai, China

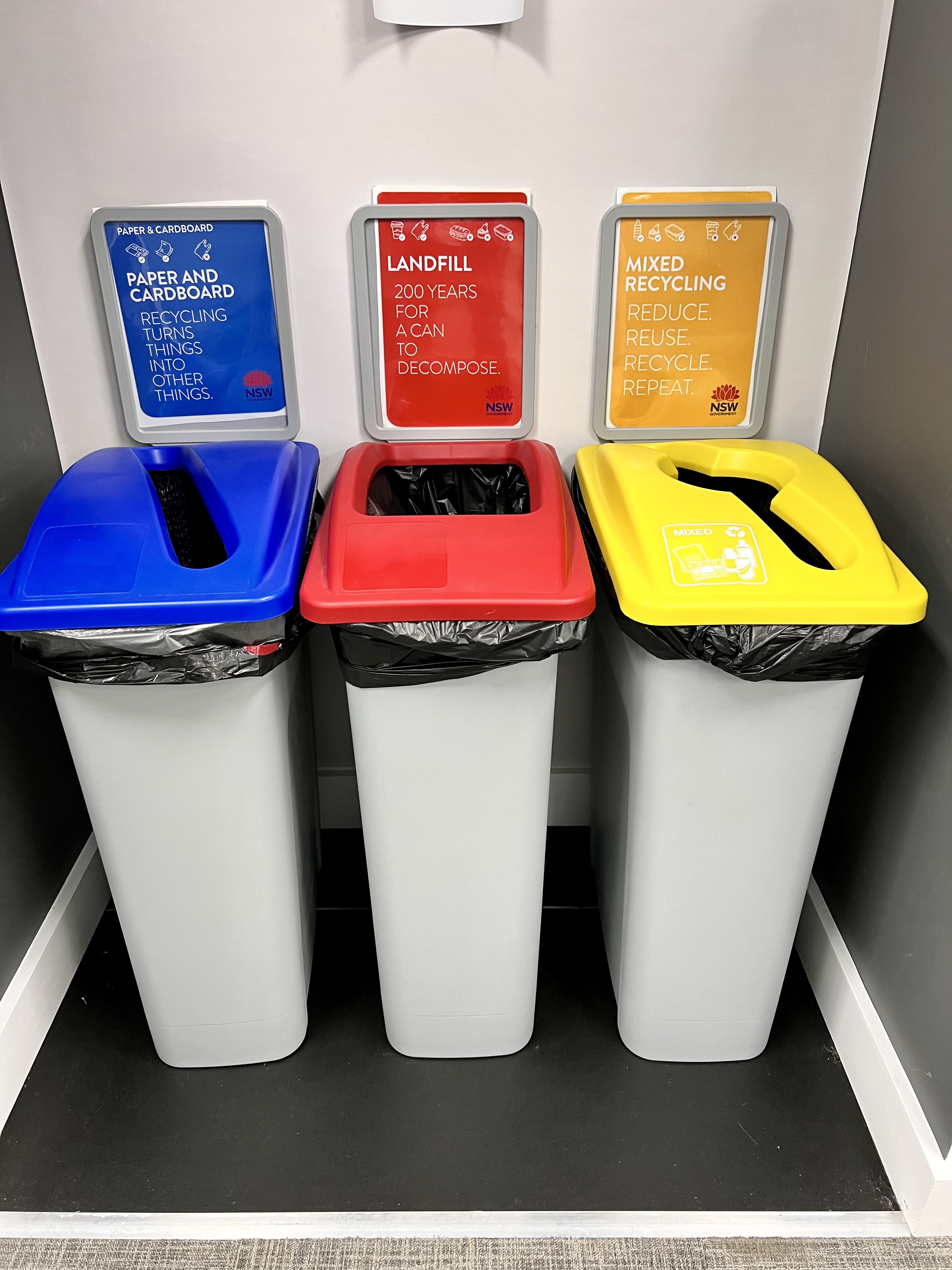
Sorted waste containers in Australia

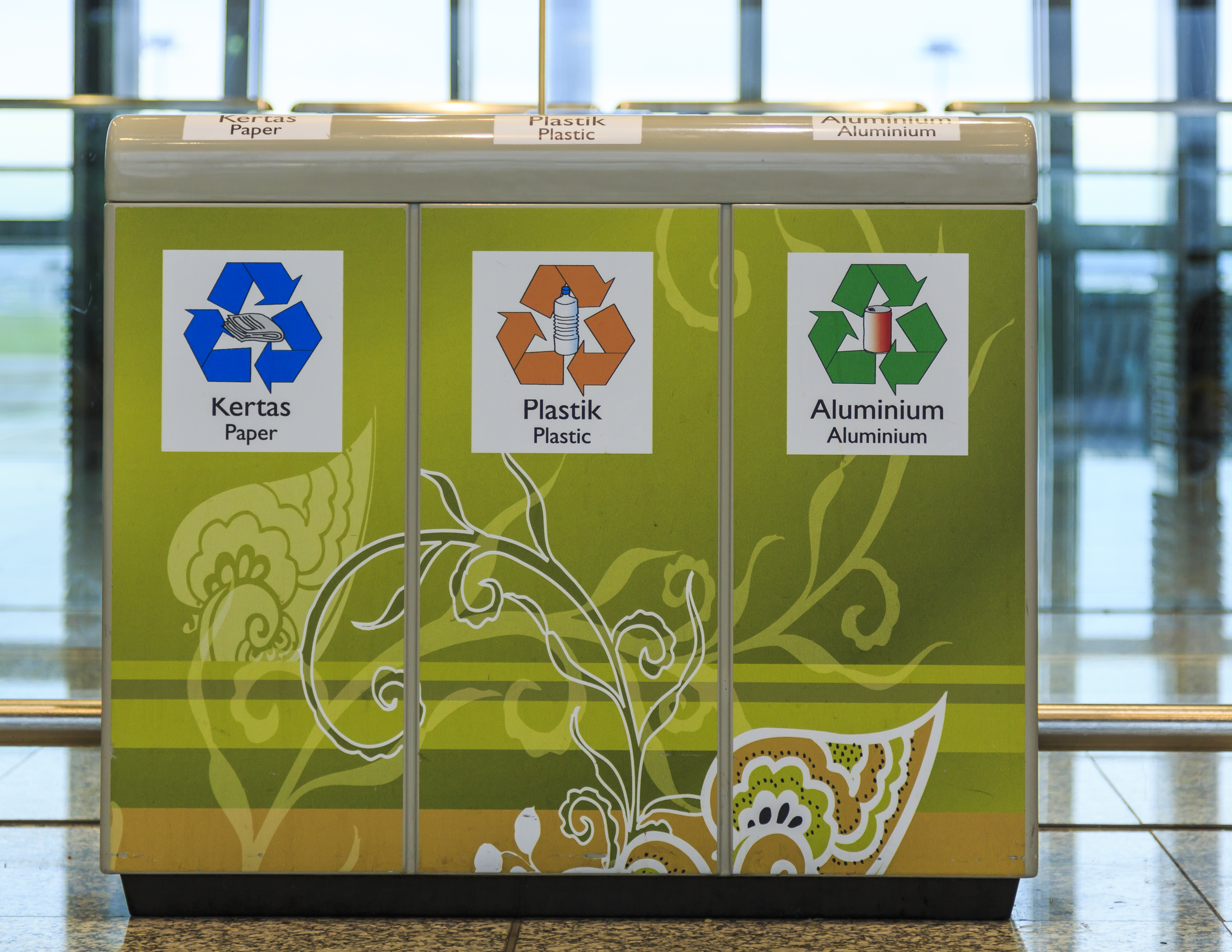
Sorted waste containers in Kuala Lumpur, Malaysia

== See also ==
- Litter
- Recycling
- Index of recycling topics
- E-Cycling (recycling of electronic components)
- Plastic recycling
- Sustainability
- Trash (computing)
- 2000s commodities boom
- Waste sorting
