= Bureau of Normalization =

The Bureau of Normalization (NBN; Dutch: Bureau voor Normalisatie; French: Bureau de normalisation) is the Belgian national organization for standardization and is the country's ISO member body.

Its name was changed in 2003 from Belgian Institute for Normalization.
