= Ministry of Statistics and Programme Implementation =

Government ministry of India

- Branch of Government of India

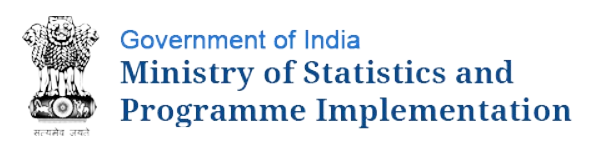
- Ministry of Statistics and Programme Implementation

Agency overview
- Jurisdiction: Government of India
- Annual budget: ₹4,859 crore (US$500 million) (2018–19 est.)
- Agency executive: Rao Inderjit Singh, Minister of State (Independent Charge)
- Child agencies: Department of Statistics; Department of Programme Implementation
- Website: new.mospi.gov.in

The Ministry of Statistics and Programme Implementation (MoSPI) is an executive ministry of the Government of India concerned with coverage and quality aspects of statistics released. The surveys conducted by the Ministry are based on scientific sampling methods.

== History ==
The Ministry of Statistics and Programme Implementation came into existence as an independent ministry on 15 October 1999 following the merger of the Department of Statistics and the Department of Programme Implementation.

== Organization ==
The Ministry has two departments:

- Department of Statistics
- Department of Programme Implementation.

The Department of Statistics consists of the:

1. National Statistical Office(NSO)
2. Computer Center

The Department of Programme Implementation has two divisions, namely:

1. Infrastructure Monitoring and Project Monitoring(IPMD)
2. Member of Parliament Local Area Development Scheme(MPLADS)

Besides these wings, there is the National Statistical Commission, an autonomous body which formed on 12 July 2006 under the recommendation of Rangarajan commission. It was created through a resolution of Government of India.

One autonomous Institute, viz., the Indian Statistical Institute declared as an Institute of National Importance by an act of Parliament.

The Ministry of Statistics and Programme Implementation attaches considerable importance to coverage and quality aspects of statistics released in the country. The statistics released are based on administrative sources, surveys and censuses conducted by the center and State Governments and non-official sources and studies.

The surveys conducted by the Ministry are based on scientific sampling methods. Field data are collected through dedicated field staff. In line with the emphasis on the quality of statistics released by the Ministry, the methodological issues concerning the compilation of national accounts are overseen Committees like Advisory Committee on National Accounts, Standing Committee on Industrial Statistics, Technical Advisory Committee on Price Indices. The Ministry compiles data sets based on current data, after applying standard statistical techniques and extensive scrutiny and supervision.

=== Verticals under the National Statistical Office (NSO) ===
- Central Statistics
- National Sample Survey
- Data Governance
- Administration

=== Central Statistics Vertical ===
- Economics Statistics Division (ESD)
- Social Statistics Division (SSD)
- National Accounts Division (NAD)
- Price Statistics Division (PSD)

=== National Sample Survey Vertical ===
- Household Survey Division (HSD)
- Enterprise Survey Division (EnSD)
- Field Operations Division (FOD)
- Coordination and Quality Control Division (C&QCD)

=== Data Governance Vertical ===
- Capacity Development Division
- Coordination and International Cooperation Division (CICD)
- Administrative Statistics & Policy Division (ASPD)
- Data Informatics & Innovation Division (DIID)
- State Unit

=== Administration Vertical ===
The Ministry functions as the Cadre Controlling Authority for Indian Statistical Service and Subordinate Statistical Service including matters like training, career and manpower planning; and acts as the nodal Ministry for the Indian Statistical Institute and ensures its functioning in accordance with the provisions of the Indian Statistical Institute Act, 1959 (57 of 1959).The administration vertical under the statistics wing has the following divisions:

- Subordinate Statistical Service (SSS)
- Research & Analysis Division (RAD)
- Media & Publicity Unit (MPU)
- Budget and Finance Division
- Administration Division
- National Statistical Commission Secretariat (NSCS)
- Indian Statistical Service Division
- Vigilance Division
- Indian Statistical Institute (ISI)

== Statistics Wing (NSO) responsibilities ==
The National Statistical Office (NSO) is mandated with the following responsibilities:

1. acts as the nodal agency for planned development of the statistical system in the country, lays down and maintains norms and standards in the field of statistics, involving concepts and definitions, methodology of data collection, processing of data and dissemination of results;
2. coordinates the statistical work in respect of the Ministries/Departments of the Government of India and State Statistical Bureaus (SSBs), advises the Ministries/Departments of the Government of India on statistical methodology and on statistical analysis of data;
3. prepares national accounts as well as publishes annual estimates of national product, government and private consumption expenditure, capital formation, savings, estimates of capital stock and consumption of fixed capital, as also the state level gross capital formation of supra-regional sectors and prepares comparable estimates of State Domestic Product (SDP) at current prices;
4. maintains liaison with international statistical organizations, such as, the United Nations Statistical Division (UNSD), the Economic and Social Commission for Asia and the Pacific (ESCAP), the Statistical Institute for Asia and the Pacific (SIAP), the International Monetary Fund (IMF), the Asian Development Bank (ADB), the Food and Agriculture Organizations (FAO), the International Labour Organizations (ILO), etc.
5. compiles and releases the Index of Industrial Production (IIP) every month in the form of ‘quick estimates’; conducts the Annual Survey of Industries (ASI); and provides statistical information to assess and evaluate the changes in the growth, composition and structure of the organized manufacturing sector;
6. organizes and conducts periodic all-India Economic Censuses and follow-up enterprise surveys, provides an in-house facility to process the data collected through various socio economic surveys and follow-up enterprise surveys of Economic Censuses;
7. conducts large scale all-India sample surveys for creating the database needed for studying the impact of specific problems for the benefit of different population groups in diverse socio economic areas, such as employment, consumer expenditure, housing conditions and environment, literacy levels, health, nutrition, family welfare, etc.;
8. examines the survey reports from the technical angle and evaluates the sampling design including survey feasibility studies in respect of surveys conducted by the National Sample Survey Organizations and other Central Ministries and Departments;
9. dissemination of statistical information on various aspects through a number of publications distributed to Government, semi-Government, or private data users/ agencies; and disseminates data, on request, to the United Nations agencies like the UNSD, the ESCAP, the ILO and other international agencies;
10. releases grants-in-aid to registered non-governmental organizations and research institutions of repute for undertaking special studies or surveys, printing of statistical reports, and financing seminars, workshops and conferences relating to different subject areas of official statistics;

== Programme Implementation Wing responsibilities ==
1. Monitoring of the Twenty Point Programme (TPP)
2. Monitoring the performance of the country's 11 key infrastructure sectors, viz., Power, Coal, Steel, Railways, Telecommunications, Ports, Fertilizers, Cement, Petroleum & Natural Gas, Roads and Civil Aviation (IPMD);
3. Monitoring of all Central Sector Projects costing Rs. 150 crore and above (IPMD); and
4. Monitoring the implementation of Members of Parliament Local Area Development Scheme (MPLADS).

== Plans ==
The Ministry is looking at allotting a 16-digit Business identification number to each business establishment. Apart from helping the government create and maintain a comprehensive database on businesses, the unique number will also simplify a business' dealings with various governmental agencies by reducing chances of duplicate entities, resolving identity issues and saving time when going for future registrations or licences.

== Cabinet Ministers ==
- Note: MoS, I/C – Minister of State (Independent Charge)

Portrait	Minister (Birth-Death) Constituency	Term of office			Political party	Ministry	Prime Minister
Portrait	Minister (Birth-Death) Constituency	From	To	Period	Political party	Ministry	Prime Minister
	Atal Bihari Vajpayee (1924–2018); MP for Lucknow (Prime Minister)	13 October 1999	1 September 2001	1 year, 323 days	Bharatiya Janata Party	Vajpayee III	Atal Bihari Vajpayee
	Jagmohan (1927–2021); MP for New Delhi	1 September 2001	18 November 2001	78 days	Bharatiya Janata Party	Vajpayee III	Atal Bihari Vajpayee
	Maneka Gandhi (born 1956); MP for Pilibhit (MoS, I/C)	18 November 2001	30 June 2002	224 days	Bharatiya Janata Party	Vajpayee III	Atal Bihari Vajpayee
	Atal Bihari Vajpayee (1924–2018); MP for Lucknow (Prime Minister)	1 July 2002	22 May 2004	1 year, 326 days	Bharatiya Janata Party	Vajpayee III	Atal Bihari Vajpayee
	Oscar Fernandes (1941–2021); Rajya Sabha MP for Karnataka (MoS, I/C)	23 May 2004	29 January 2006	1 year, 251 days	Indian National Congress	Manmohan I	Manmohan Singh
	G. K. Vasan (born 1964); Rajya Sabha MP for Tamil Nadu (MoS, I/C)	29 January 2006	22 May 2009	3 years, 113 days	Indian National Congress	Manmohan I	Manmohan Singh
	Sriprakash Jaiswal (born 1944); MP for Kanpur (MoS, I/C)	28 May 2009	19 January 2011	1 year, 236 days	Indian National Congress	Manmohan II	Manmohan Singh
	M. S. Gill (1936–2023); Rajya Sabha MP for Punjab	19 January 2011	12 July 2011	174 days	Indian National Congress	Manmohan II	Manmohan Singh
	Srikant Kumar Jena (born 1950); MP for Balasore (MoS, I/C)	12 July 2011	26 May 2014	2 years, 318 days	Indian National Congress	Manmohan II	Manmohan Singh
	Rao Inderjit Singh (born 1951); MP for Gurgaon (MoS, I/C)	27 May 2014	9 November 2014	166 days	Bharatiya Janata Party	Modi I	Narendra Modi
	(General); V. K. Singh (Retd.); PVSM AVSM YSM ADC (born 1950); MP for Ghaziabad (MoS, I/C)	9 November 2014	5 July 2016	1 year, 239 days	Bharatiya Janata Party	Modi I	Narendra Modi
	D. V. Sadananda Gowda (born 1953); MP for Bangalore North	5 July 2016	30 May 2019	2 years, 329 days	Bharatiya Janata Party	Modi I	Narendra Modi
	Rao Inderjit Singh (born 1951); MP for Gurgaon (MoS, I/C)	31 May 2019	9 June 2024	7 years, 70 days	Bharatiya Janata Party	Modi II	Narendra Modi
	Rao Inderjit Singh (born 1951); MP for Gurgaon (MoS, I/C)	10 June 2024	Incumbent	7 years, 70 days	Bharatiya Janata Party	Modi III	Narendra Modi

== Ministers of State ==
Portrait	Minister (Birth-Death) Constituency	Term of office			Political party	Ministry	Prime Minister
Portrait	Minister (Birth-Death) Constituency	From	To	Period	Political party	Ministry	Prime Minister
	Bangaru Laxman (1939–2014); Rajya Sabha MP for Gujarat	13 October 1999	22 November 1999	40 days	Bharatiya Janata Party	Vajpayee III	Atal Bihari Vajpayee
	Arun Shourie (born 1941); Rajya Sabha MP for Uttar Pradesh	22 November 1999	1 September 2001	1 year, 283 days	Bharatiya Janata Party	Vajpayee III	Atal Bihari Vajpayee
	Vijay Goel (born 1954); MP for Chandni Chowk	1 July 2002	29 January 2003	212 days	Bharatiya Janata Party	Vajpayee III	Atal Bihari Vajpayee
	Satyabrata Mookherjee (1932–2023); MP for Krishnanagar	29 January 2003	22 May 2004	1 year, 114 days	Bharatiya Janata Party	Vajpayee III	Atal Bihari Vajpayee
	Vijay Goel (born 1954); Rajya Sabha MP for Rajasthan	3 September 2017	30 May 2019	1 year, 269 days	Bharatiya Janata Party	Modi I	Narendra Modi
