= Business identification number =

Proposed corporate ID in India

Business identification number (BIN) is a proposed identification number to replace eighteen different registration numbers required to be obtained by a company to operate in India. Business identification number or BIN is a proposed identification number to replace eighteen different registration numbers required to be obtained by a company to operate in India. The Ministry of Statistics and Programme Implementation is looking at allotting a 16-digit number to each business establishment. Apart from helping the government create and maintain a comprehensive database on businesses, the unique number will also simplify a business's dealings with various governmental agencies by reducing chances of duplicate entities, resolving identity issues and saving time when going for future registrations or licences.
