= Bin Prefecture (Shaanxi) =

Historical administrative division in Shaanxi, China

Location of Bin Prefecture in Shaanxi Province, 1820

Binzhou or Bin Prefecture (邠州) was a zhou (prefecture) in imperial China centering around modern Bin County (彬县), Shaanxi, China. It existed from 725 to 1913.

== Geography ==
The administrative region of Bin Prefecture during the Tang dynasty is in Xianning, Shaanxi. It probably includes parts of modern:

- Bin County
- Changwu County
- Xunyi County
- Yongshou County

== See also ==
- Xinping Commandery
