= Bin Prefecture (Shandong) =

Prefecture in imperial China

Binzhou or Bin Prefecture (Chinese: 濱州) was a zhou (prefecture) in imperial China centering around modern Binzhou, Shandong, China. It existed from 956 to 1913.

The current prefecture-level city of Binzhou, established in 1982, retains its name.

== Geography ==
The administrative region of Bin Prefecture in the early Song dynasty is in modern northern Shandong. It probably includes parts of modern:

- Under the administration of Binzhou:
  - Binzhou
  - Boxing County
- Under the administration of Dongying:
  - Lijin County
