= Li E =

Chinese poet, essayist and scholar

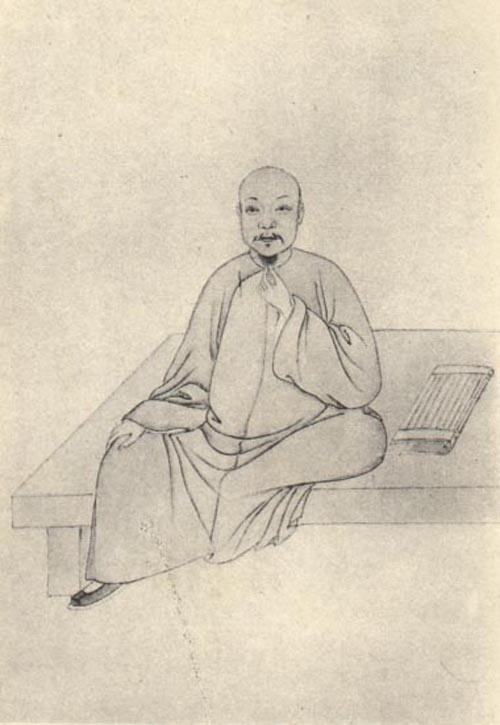
Portrait of Li E from Portraits and Biographies of Qing Dynasty Scholars

Li E (Chinese: 厲鶚; 1692–1752), courtesy name Taihong (太鴻), art name Fanxie (樊榭), was a Chinese poet, essayist, and scholar of the Qing dynasty. Known for his erudition and his poems of the "pure and spare" style, Li is recognized as one of the leaders of the Zhejiang School of poetry.

== Life ==
Born in a poor family in Qiantang (modern Hangzhou, Zhejiang), Li and his siblings were orphaned in early childhood. His elder brother sold tobacco while he studied and worked as a tutor. From 1714–1719, he taught the wealthy brothers Wang Hang (汪沆, Wāng Hàng, 1704–1784) and Wang Pu (汪浦). A poem by Wang Hang was later responsible for the naming of Yangzhou's Slender West Lake.

In 1720 Li passed the imperial examination for the juren degree. He was unable to advance his career in government, partly due to his temperament. Instead, he made a name for himself as the most erudite person with regard to Song dynasty poetry. He is widely considered a leader of the Zhejiang School of poetry (also known as Western Zhejiang School of Lyrics), which was started by Zha Shenxing and Zhu Yizun. From 1731–1734, he assisted with the compilation of the West Lake Records (《西湖志》, Xīhú Zhì).

Li E valued his interest in scholarship more than his worldly career. When he was passing through Tianjin on the way to capital Beijing for a government appointment, he was invited to stay with the wealthy scholar Zha Weiren. When he found out that Zha had been working on annotating 13th-century scholar Zhou Mi's Jue Miao Hao Ci (Best of the Best Lyrics), Li abandoned his appointment and decided to join forces with Zha. In 1749, they completed their work Jue Miao Hao Ci Jian (An Annotated Best of the Best Lyrics), which was printed the following year. Li E died two years later in 1752.

== Works ==
Besides Jue Miao Hao Ci Jian, Li's major works include Fanxie Shanfang Ji 樊榭山房集 (The Collection of Fanxie Mountain Studio, 20 volumes), and the monumental annotated anthology Song Shi Jishi (Recorded Occasions in Song Poetry), which comprises 100 volumes, with a preface written in 1746. Song Shi Jishi was modelled after Tang Shi Jishi (唐詩紀事), a valuable anthology of Tang dynasty poems compiled by Ji Yougong (計有功) in the twelfth century.

== Style ==
Like Zhu Yizun, Li E was an admirer of the qingkong (pure and spare) style of Song dynasty poets Jiang Kui and Zhang Yan. One of Li's famous lines, "雨洗秋濃人淡", comprises six Chinese characters that literally read: "rain/wash/autumn/lush/people/pale". It is translated by Shirleen S. Wong as "Autumn ablaze with colors after rain, but paler she looks". This "pure and spare" style attempts to create an impression of etherealness and delicateness, in contrast to the boastful expressions in the works of poets such as Su Shi and Xin Qiji.

A major proportion of Li E's poetic creations are landscape poems, often about his beloved hometown of Hangzhou. It is said that he had written at least one poem about every well known scenic spot in the city. For example, one of his poems about the Lingyin Temple reads: "Atop crowded peaks the moon shines; Amid jumbled leaves a stream flows. One lamp sets all motion to rest. The lone sound of a chime empties the Four Skies." Li's poetry is often imbued with an air of quiet beauty, but he is also known to have a penchant to use obscure allusions or words in his poems.
