= Manchu literature =

Literature written in the Manchu language

Manchu became a literary language after the creation of the Manchu script in 1599. Romance of the Three Kingdoms was translated by Dahai. Dahai translated Wanbao quanshu 萬寶全書.

Hong Taiji sponsored the translations of many Chinese language histories and classics in his newly declared Qing dynasty.

The majority of literary works in Manchu during the Qing dynasty consisted of officially sanctioned translations of Chinese Confucian classics and political works, and later translations of Chinese novels and texts on medicine, history, religion. There were few Manchu archetypal literary works.

The German sinologist Eric Hauer argued that the Manchu translations of Chinese classics and fiction were done by experts familiar with their original meaning and with how best to express it in Manchu. Because Manchu is easy to learn, these translations enable the student to use the Manchu versions of the classics to verify the meaning of the Chinese text, for instance, the Manchu translation of the Peiwen yunfu or the language of difficult Chinese novels, such as Jin Ping Mei. Most original material produced in Manchu were histories and documentary texts relating to military and foreign affairs on the northern frontiers which were handled by the Lifan Yuan, such as campaigns against the Dzungars.

Many Chinese medical texts were translated into Manchu under the Qianlong Emperor.

== List of works ==
=== Works translated into Manchu ===
==== Classics and histories ====
- History of Liao 遼史 ᡩᠠᡳᠯᡳᠶᠣᠣ
  ᡤᡠᡵᡠᠨ ‍‍ᡳ
  ᠰᡠᡩᡠᡵᡳ Wylie: Dailiyoo gurun i suduri, Möllendorff: Dailiyoo gurun i suduri.
- History of Jin 金史 ᠠᡳᠰᡳᠨ
  ᡤᡠᡵᡠᠨ ‍‍ᡳ
  ᠰᡠᡩᡠᡵᡳ Wylie: Aisin gurun i suduri, Möllendorff: Aisin gurun i suduri.
- History of Yuan 元史 ᠶᡠᠸᠠᠨ
  ᡤᡠᡵᡠᠨ ‍‍ᡳ
  ᠰᡠᡩᡠᡵᡳ Wylie: Yuwan gurun i suduri, Möllendorff: Yuwan gurun i suduri.
- Spring and Autumn Annals 春秋 ᠨᡳᠶᡝᠩᠨᡳᠶᡝᡵᡳ
  ᠪᠣᠯᠣᡵᡳ ‍‍ᡳ
  ᠪᡳᡨᡥᡝ Wylie: Niengniyeri polori i pitghe, Möllendorff: Niyengniyeri bolori i bithe.
- Four Books 四書 were translated in 1683 into Manchu as ᡥᠠᠨ ‍‍ᡳ
  ᠠᡵᠠᡥᠠ
  ᡳᠨᡝᠩᡤᡳᡩᠠᡵᡳ
  ᡤᡳᠶᠠᠩᠨᠠᡥᠠ
  ᠰᡟ
  ᡧᡠ Wylie: Han i araha inenggidari giyangnaha sze shu, Möllendorff: Han i araha Inenggidari giyangnaha sy šu, Translation: The Four books with the daily readings.
- General History of China 通鑒綱目 or 通鑑綱目 ᡨᡠᠩ
  ᡤᡳᠶᠠᠨ
  ᡬᠠᠩ
  ᠮᡠ Wylie: Tung giyan g'ang mu, Möllendorff: Tung giyan g'ang mu
- The Art of War 孫子兵法 ᠴᠣᠣᡥᠠᡳ
  ᠪᠠᡳᡨᠠ
  ᠪᡝ
  ᡤᡳᠰᡠᡵᡝᠩᡤᡝ Wylie: Tchauhai paita pe gisurengge, Möllendorff: Coohai baita be gisurengge, Discourse on the art of War
- Book of History 書經 was translated in 1760 as ᡥᠠᠨ
  ᡳ
  ᠠᡵᠠᡥᠠ
  ᡠᠪᠠᠯᡳᠶᠠᠮᠪᡠᡥᠠ
  ᡩᠠᠰᠠᠨ
  ᡳ
  ᠨᠣᠮᡠᠨ Wylie: Han i araha upaliyampuha dasan i nomun, Möllendorff: Han i araha ubaliyambuha dasan i nomun. 御製繙譯書經
- Book of Odes 詩經 ᡥᠠᠨ
  ᡳ
  ᠠᡵᠠᡥᠠ
  ᡠᠪᠠᠯᡳᠶᠠᠮᠪᡠᡥᠠ
  ᡳᡵᡤᡝᠪᡠᠨ
  ᡳ
  ᠨᠣᠮᡠᠨ Wylie: Han i araha upaliyampuha irgepun i nomun, Möllendorff: Han i araha ubaliyambuha irgebun i nomun.
- Three Character Classic 三字經 was translated in 1796 as ᠮᠠᠨᠵᡠ
  ᠨᡳᡴᠠᠨ
  ᡥᡝᡵᡤᡝᠨ
  ᡳ
  ᡴᠠᠮᠴᡳᠮᡝ
  ᠰᡠᡥᡝ
  ᠰᠠᠨ
  ᡯ
  ᡤᡳᠩ
  ᠪᡳᡨᡥᡝ Wylie: Manchu nikan ghergen i kamtsime sughe San tsz' ging pitghe, Möllendorff: Manju nikan hergen-i kamcime suhe San ze ging ni bithe, Translation: The three character classic, in Manchu and Chinese.

==== Military manuals ====
The first Manchu translations of Chinese works were the Liu-t'ao 六韜, Su-shu 素書, and San-lueh 三略- all Chinese military texts dedicated to the arts of war due to the Manchu interests in the topic, like Sun-Tzu's work The Art of War. The military related texts which were translated into Manchu from Chinese were translated by Dahai. Manchu translations of Chinese texts included the Ming penal code and military texts were performed by Dahai. These translations were requested of Dahai by Nurhaci. The military text Wu-tzu was translated into Manchu along with Sun-Tzu's work The Art of War. Chinese history, Chinese law, and Chinese military theory classical texts were translated into Manchu during the rule of Hong Taiji in Mukden with Manchus placing significance upon military and governance related Chinese texts. A Manchu translation was made of the military themed Chinese novel Romance of the Three Kingdoms. Chinese literature, military theory and legal texts were translated into Manchu by Dahai and Erdeni. The translations were ordered in 1629. The translation of the military texts San-lüeh, Su-shu, and the Ta Ming hui-tien (the Ming law) done by Dahai was ordered by Nurhaci. While it was mainly administrative and ethical guidance which made up most of San-lüeh and Su Shu, military science was indeed found in the Liu-t'ao and Chinese military manuals were eagerly translated by the Manchus and the Manchus were also attracted to the military content in Romance of the Three Kingdoms which is why it was translated. The Art of War was translated into Manchu as ᠴᠣᠣᡥᠠᡳ
ᠪᠠᡳᡨᠠ
ᠪᡝ
ᡤᡳᠰᡠᡵᡝᠩᡤᡝ Wylie: Tchauhai paita be gisurengge, Möllendorff: Coohai baita de gisurengge, Discourse on the art of War. Another later Manchu translation was made by Aisin Gioro Qiying.

==== Novels ====
- Jin Ping Mei 金瓶梅 ᡤᡳᠨ
  ᡦᡳᠩ
  ᠮᡝᡳ
  ᠪᡳᡨᡥᡝ Wylie: Gin p'ing mei pitghe, Möllendorff: Gin ping mei bithe
- The Carnal Prayer Mat 肉蒲團 ᡰᡝᠣ
  ᡦᡠ
  ᡨᡠᠸᠠᠨ
  ᡳ
  ᠪᡳᡨᡥᡝ Wylie: Jeo p'u tuwan i pitghe, Möllendorff: žeo pu tuwan i bithe
- Romance of the Three Kingdoms 三國演義 ᡳᠯᠠᠨ
  ᡤᡠᡵᡠᠨ
  ᡳ
  ᠪᡳᡨᡥᡝ Möllendorff: Ilan gurun-i bithe
- Water Margin 水滸傳 Möllendorff: Sui hū bithe
- Strange Stories from a Chinese Studio 聊齋誌異 Möllendorff: Sonjofi ubaliyambuha Liyoo jai jy i bithe

==== Plays ====
- Romance of the Western Chamber 西廂記 Möllendorff: Manju nikan Si siang ki

==== Bannerman tales ====
A notable genre is 'Bannerman tales' (子弟書, zidishu), a sung verse narrative genre that developed within the Manchu bannerman community in Beijing in the 18th century, flourished in the 19th century and continued to be practiced even during the Republican era. There is at least one example of a Manchu-Mandarin bilingual text, but the Manchu version has been argued to be a translation from the Chinese one. Some other texts contain Manchu expressions within the Mandarin text, but most were only in Mandarin and were based on classic works of Chinese fiction. The performers were sometimes professionals, but often amateur bannermen and members of the Manchu elite.

=== Original Manchu literature ===
A rare example of Manchu folklore recorded in a Manchu-language manuscript is the Tale of the Nisan Shaman. Some Qing emperors such as the Kangxi and Qianlong emperors composed poems in Manchu, such as Ode to Mukden. An official by the name of Tulišen (1667-1741) wrote Record of Foreign Regions (Manchu: Lakcaha jecen be takūraha babe ejehe bithe), a journal describing his journey to the Volga to meet Ayuki, khan of the Torguts. The most extensive original work in Manchu is Record of the Words of One Hundred and Twenty Old Men (Manchu: Emu tanggū orin sakda-i gisun sarkiyan) by Sungyun (1754-1835), a collection of 120 essays on numerous different subjects.

== Bibliography ==
- Crossley, Pamela Kyle and Evelyn S. Rawski (1993). "A Profile of the Manchu Language in Ch'ing History". Harvard Journal of Asiatic Studies. 53 (1): 63–102. doi:10.2307/2719468. JSTOR 2719468.
- Durrant, Stephen (Fall 1977). "Manchu Translations of Chou Dynasty Texts". Early China. 3. Society for the Study of Early China: 52–54. doi:10.1017/S0362502800006623. JSTOR 23351361. S2CID 191822020.
- Elliott, Mark (2013). "Why Study Manchu?". Manchu Studies Group.
- Hanson, Marta (2003). "The "Golden Mirror" in the Imperial Court of the Qianlong Emperor, 1739-1742". Early Science and Medicine. 8 (2): 111–147. doi:10.1163/157338203x00035. JSTOR 4130134. PMID 15043047.
- Hauer, Erich (1930). "Why the Sinologue Should Study Manchu" (PDF). Journal of the North China Branch of the Royal Asiatic Society. 61: 156–164.
- von Möllendorff, P. G. (1890). "Essay on Manchu Literature". Journal of the China Branch of the Royal Asiatic Society. 24–25: 1–45.
- Norman, Jerry (2003). "The Manchus and Their Language (Presidential Address)". Journal of the American Oriental Society. 123 (3): 483–491. doi:10.2307/3217747. JSTOR 3217747.
