= Xibe =

Xibe may refer to:

- Xibe people, a Tungusic ethnic group in western and northeastern China
- Xibe language, a Tungusic language spoken by the Xibe people
