= Kūwaja =

Kūwaja (Manchu: ᡴᡡᠸᠠᠵᠠ, romanized: Kūwaja; d. 1682) was a Qing military officer of the Irgen Gioro clan and the Manchu Bordered Red Banner. He was a grandson of G'ag'ai, one of the creators of the Manchu script, and a son of Bušan, a Deliberative Minister of the early Qing dynasty. Kūwaja rose to the highest position of Commander of the Bordered Red Banner Mongols (鑲紅旗蒙古都統).

== Biography ==
In 1645, Kūwaja inherited his father's hereditary rank of baitalabure hafan and was promoted by imperial favor to the hereditary rank of adaha hafan. In 1660, he was appointed jalan i janggin in the elite Bayara forces and concurrently served as a nirui janggin.

After the outbreak of the Revolt of the Three Feudatories in 1674, Kūwaja followed the General Hirgen, in campaigns against Geng Jingzhong. During the siege of Fuzhou, Jiangxi, he repeatedly defeated rebel forces, forcing them to abandon the foothold and flee. In 1675, he joined the campaign against Wu Sangui under the command of the Grand General and Prince Yolo. At Pingxiang, he repeatedly defeated the forces of Xia Guoxiang (夏國相), who had established defensive positions in the surrounding mountains. In 1678, Kūwaja was promoted to Commander of the Bayara (護軍統領). The following year, he was further promoted to Commander of the Bordered Red Banner Mongols and accompanied Prince Yolo in the attack on Wugang. During the campaign, he led troops in joint operations by both land and water, defeating rebel forces on multiple occasions. In 1680, he led his troops to Guangxi, where he assisted the Grand General and Prince Labu, in military affairs. He subsequently defeated the rebel commander Ma Chengyin, captured Wuning, Xiangzhou, and Liuzhou, and played an important role in the pacification of Guangxi. Later that year, he returned in triumph to Beijing. Kūwaja died in 1682. After his death, he was posthumously promoted the hereditary noble rank of First-Class Light Chariot Commandant.
