= Xibo =

Xibo may refer to:

- Xibo people, Tungusic people in Asia
- Xibo language, language of Xibo people
- King Wen of Zhou (1152 – 1056 BC), or Xibo (西伯, western leader), king of the Zhou dynasty
- Western Bo (Xibo; 西亳), early Shang capital, identified by some scholars with Yanshi Shang city

== See also ==
- Zibo
