= Dahai =

Manchu name
- Manchu script: ᡩᠠᡥᠠᡳ
- Möllendorff: dahai

Chinese name
- Chinese: 達海
Transcriptions
Standard Mandarin
- Hanyu Pinyin: dá hǎi

Dahai (1595–1632) was a Manchu scholar, translator, and official of the Giorca clan (覺爾察氏) from the Plain Blue Banner. Known for his mastery of Manchu, Mongolian, and Chinese, he was granted the scholar title Baksi by Hong Taiji. Building upon the script created by G'ag'ai and Erdeni, Dahai revised and standardized the Manchu writing system, and was later revered by the Manchus as the "Sage" of the Manchu script.

== Biography ==
Born into a family that had become a member of Nurhaci's banner forces, Dahai entered the Literary Office (文館) at the age of twenty. He drafted official correspondence with the Ming, Mongols, and Joseon, translated imperial edicts into Chinese, and rendered numerous Chinese works into Manchu, including the Collected Statutes of the Ming Dynasty and the Three Strategies of Huang Shigong.

After Hong Taiji succeeded Nurhaci, Dahai became one of the primary translators of the Literary Office. During the campaigns against the Ming between 1629 and 1631, he drafted diplomatic letters, translated imperial proclamations into Chinese to encourage surrender, and communicated with surrendered Ming commanders. In recognition of his service, he was awarded the title of Baksi in 1631.

In 1632, Hong Taiji ordered Dahai to improve the Manchu script, whose original form contained ambiguities inherited from the Mongolian alphabet. Dahai introduced dots and circles (圈點) to distinguish consonants and vowels and added new orthographic conventions that greatly improved the accuracy of writing Manchu. His revised system, later known as the Standard (or New) Manchu script, became the official written form of the language.

Dahai died of illness in 1632 at the age of thirty-eight while translating several major Chinese classics, including the Zizhi Tongjian, Mencius, Six Secret Teachings, and Romance of the Three Kingdoms, leaving these projects unfinished. He was posthumously honored with the title Wencheng (文成, "Cultured and Accomplished") in 1636, and in 1669 the Kangxi Emperor ordered a commemorative stele erected in recognition of his contributions. Due to his decisive role in perfecting the Manchu script, Dahai came to be honored among the Manchus as the "Sage" of their written language.
