= Wu Qian =

Wu Qian may refer to:

- Wu Qian (military officer) (born 1973), Chinese military officer
- Wu Qian (pianist) (born 1984), Chinese pianist
- Wu Qian (basketball, born 1986), Chinese basketball player
- Wu Qian (basketball, born 1994), Chinese basketball player
- Janice Wu (born 1992), Chinese actress

== See also ==
- Wuqian Commandery, see Commandery (China)
