= Ušan =

Ušan (Manchu: ᡠᡧᠠᠨ, romanized: Ušan; 1584–1644) was a Qing Dynasty military and political figure of the Irgen Gioro clan of the Manchu Bordered Red Banner. He was the eldest son of G'ag'ai, one of the creators of the Manchu script. During the Hong Taiji's era, he was appointed as one of the Sixteen Ministers (十六大臣) and later served as Right Vice Minister of Works.

== Biography ==
Ušan's father, G'ag'ai, was executed for his alleged involvement in the conspiracy of the former Hada ruler Menggebulu to assassinate Nurhaci. Ušan was sixteen years old at the time. In recognition of G'ag'ai's previous services, Nurhaci granted Ušan the hereditary position of nirui janggin.

In 1624, Mao Wenlong, commander of the Ming garrison at Dongjiang, sent troops across the Yalu River west of Uiju in Korea to cultivate military farms on nearby islands. Nurhaci ordered Ušan and the vice banner commander Lenggeri to lead 1,000 troops in a surprise attack. After capturing and interrogating a spy, they learned that Mao's forces harvested grain on the islands during the day and returned across the river to camp near Uiju at night. Taking advantage of the darkness, Ušan advanced along a remote route and launched a cavalry assault at dawn. The Ming forces were caught completely off guard and fled in disorder. Ušan's troops pursued them after landing on the island, killing large numbers and taking more than 500 heads. Many others drowned while attempting to escape. The Manchu army then burned all the grain stores on the island before withdrawing. Subsequently, Mao Wenlong sent 300 troops in an attempt at retaliation, but they were defeated by Ušan and Lenggeri. Three Ming officers were killed in action, and the previously looted supplies were recovered.

After the accession of Hong Taiji, Ušan was listed among the Sixteen Ministers and assisted the Bordered Red Banner prince in handling military and administrative affairs. In 1634, when Hong Taiji launched a campaign against the Ming dynasty, Ušan and Asan commanded the rear army. Following Hong Taiji's instructions, they set an ambush and defeated Ming forces. For this achievement, Ušan was awarded the hereditary rank of Adaha hafan Third-Class. In 1636, he again led troops by imperial order and inflicted a major defeat on Ming forces that had raided the imperial salt works. In 1638, Ušan was stripped of his hereditary rank after failing to report the theft of military provisions committed by subordinates of Vice Commander Ubahai. In the eighth month of the same year, he was appointed Right Vice Minister of the Ministry of Works. At that time, whenever envoys from the Mongol or the Warka tribes arrived, Ušan was routinely entrusted with overseeing the ceremonial receptions. He died of illness in 1644.

Ušan's younger brother, Bušan, was awarded the hereditary rank of Adaha hafan First-Class for his military achievements. Ušan's grandson, Walda, later served as Vice Banner Commander of Xi'an and Vice Minister of Justice in Mukden.
