= Qapqal News =

Xibe-language newspaper in Xinjiang, China

- Type: Semi-weekly newspaper
- Format: Broadsheet
- Editor-in-chief: Yiketan
- Staff writers: 25
- Founded: July 1946
- Language: Xibe
- Headquarters: Qapqal Xibe Autonomous County; Ili Kazakh Autonomous Prefecture; Xinjiang Uyghur Autonomous Region; People's Republic of China
- Circulation: 1,300

The Qapqal News (Xibe: ᠴᠠᠪᠴᠠᠯᠰᡝᠷᡣᡞᠨ, romanized: Cabcal Serkin Chinese: 察布查尔报; pinyin: Chábùchá'ěr Bào) is the world's only newspaper in the Xibe language, a Tungusic language spoken in Northwest China. It is one of roughly fifty minority-language newspapers in the Xinjiang autonomous region of China.

== History ==
The predecessor of the Qapqal News, the Sulfan Jilgan (Xibe: ᠰᡠᠯᡫᠠᠨᡪᡞᠯᡤᠠᠨ; Chinese: 苏尔凡吉尔干; pinyin: Sū'ěrfán Jí'ěrgàn; lit. 'Voice of Freedom'), was founded in July 1946 in Yining during the reign of the East Turkestan Republic. In 1954, it changed its name to Ice Banjin (Xibe: ᡞᠴᡝᠪᠠᠨᡪᡞᠨ; Chinese: 伊车班津; pinyin: Yīchē Bānjīn; lit. 'New Life News'). The paper moved its offices to its present location in the Qapqal Xibe Autonomous County in 1956. It was forced to stop publication in June 1966, during the Cultural Revolution, but was revived under its present name in October 1974, and has been in continuous operation since then.

== Circulation ==
From about 300 copies in the 1970s when it was revived, the circulation of the Qapqal News grew to about 1,300 by 2007. It now comes out twice a week. Of the subscribers, about 500 are government organisations, twenty are enthusiasts of the closely related Manchu language in places as varied as Shenyang, Beijing, Hubei, Guizhou, Sichuan, and a dozen other provinces, and the remainder are local Xibe people, mostly those in rural areas. It is sold at retail for ¥0.09, or at a full-year subscription price of ¥9. Their full-year revenue is thus only around ¥10,000; the county government gives them a subsidy to cover roughly ¥30,000 of annual paper and printing costs and ¥3,000 of salaries paid to reporters.

In 2017 the price is ¥0.9 at retail or ¥90 at a full-year subscription.

== Content ==
The newspaper's name is printed in four languages on its front page: Xibe, Chinese, Uyghur (چاپچال گېزىت, Chapchal Gëzit) and Kazakh (چاپچال گازەت, Çapçal Gazet). About 80% of its content consists of translated reports from China's official Xinhua News Agency and other wire services, with the remaining 20% written by the paper's own staff. Even the paper's own staff do not always write their articles in Xibe; sometimes, they write in Chinese, Uyghur or Kazakh and then translate it into Xibe later. The paper does not accept advertisements.

The Qapqal News plays an important role in Xibe language planning and standardisation. The editors are highly conscious of their role as the modern caretakers not just of their own language but of the Manchu language which few besides Xibe people can read and write anymore; Manchu proper is nearly extinct, with the last native speakers as of 2007 believed to be 18 octogenerian residents of the village of Sanjiazi near Qiqihar in Northern Heilongjiang. The problem is that the Xibe language exhibits increasing diglossia, with the old Manchu terminology in the standard written language being replaced by a large body of Standard Chinese loanwords in the spoken language; many younger readers lack familiarity with the older Manchu words. The editors of the Qapqal News thus worry that their desire to reach the widest audience possible conflicts with their role as a guardian of the standard language and of Manchu culture in general.

== Staff ==
The current editor-in-chief, Iktan (伊克坦, Yīkètǎn), is a graduate of the Minzu University of China; aside from Xibe, he also speaks Chinese, Uyghur, Kazakh and Russian. He began working for the Ice Banjin in 1958 and took over as editor-in-chief of the Qapqal News in 1985. The paper has a total staff of 25 people; however, all but two lack a formal journalism education background and 20 only have a middle-school or lower educational background.

== Equipment ==
From 1946 to 1954, the newspaper had to be written out by hand and mimeographed. In 1954, the paper was manually typeset using movable lead type, a practise which continued up until 2007. The editors had long hoped to move to digital typesetting and printing, but were delayed by lack of both software and hardware. Researcher Tungga Cingfu (佟加·庆夫, Tóngjiā Qìngfū) spent over ten years starting in 1994 to do research on the Xibe and Manchu languages and develop further fonts, input methods and related software, as well as write and submit standards documents, with the aid of a grant from the National Natural Science Foundation of China. Initial versions of the software were unsatisfactory because they only supported three typefaces and so the editors continue to wait for further development.

The government of the Ili Kazakh Autonomous Prefecture contributed ¥150,000 (US$24.000) in 2002 to upgrade the newspaper's printing facilities. A further governmental contribution of ¥800,000 (US$170.000) in 2007 enabled the newspaper to upgrade its aging equipment: new equipment they purchased included a hectography machine, a scanner, industrial staplers and paper cutting machines, a blade sharpener, three digital cameras, two digital video cameras, nine computers, two multifunction printers, a laser printer and two fax machines.
