= Huang Shigong =

Chinese personage and author of the Three Strategies

- An illustration of Huang Shigong
- Traditional Chinese: 黃石公
- Simplified Chinese: 黃石公
- Literal meaning: Yellow Rock Old Man
Transcriptions
Standard Mandarin
- Hanyu Pinyin: Huángshí Gōng

Huang Shigong (Chinese: 黃石公; lit. 'Yellow Rock Old Man') is a semi-mythological figure and Taoist hermit who lived between the Qin dynasty and Han dynasty. He gave Zhang Liang a treatise on military strategy called Huang Shigong San Lue (The Three Strategies of Huang Shigong) and the Lingqijing divination manual that allowed Zhang Liang to transform into an adept statesman and powerful war theorist.

== Legend ==
According to legend, Huang Shigong was an important minister of Qin Shi Huang's father, King Zhuangxiang of Qin, surnamed Wei, and named Che. After King Zhuangxiang died, it was Qin Shi Huang's turn to ascend to the throne and govern. However, he proved to be arbitrary and tyrannical, ignoring the advice of his loyal ministers. Wei Che, dismayed by the situation, chose to retire and left the court.

Upon learning of Wei Che's departure, Qin Shi Huang considered two factors. Firstly, despite his youth and recent ascension to the throne, he recognized the need for assistance in firmly establishing his rule. Secondly, Wei Che, a seasoned minister from the previous emperor's era, leaving might subject Qin Shi Huang to ridicule for being intolerant. Determined to retain Wei Che's support, Qin Shi Huang gathered trusted men and horses and chased him to the foot of Mount Li. There, he earnestly attempted to persuade Wei Che to return with kind words. Wei Che, however, remained resolute in his decision and refused to go back. Subsequently, Wei Che chose to live in seclusion in the Huanghua Cave at the base of Mount Huang in the northwest of Pizhou. Due to the unknown nature of his real name, people began referring to him as Huang Shigong.

=== Meeting Zhang Liang ===
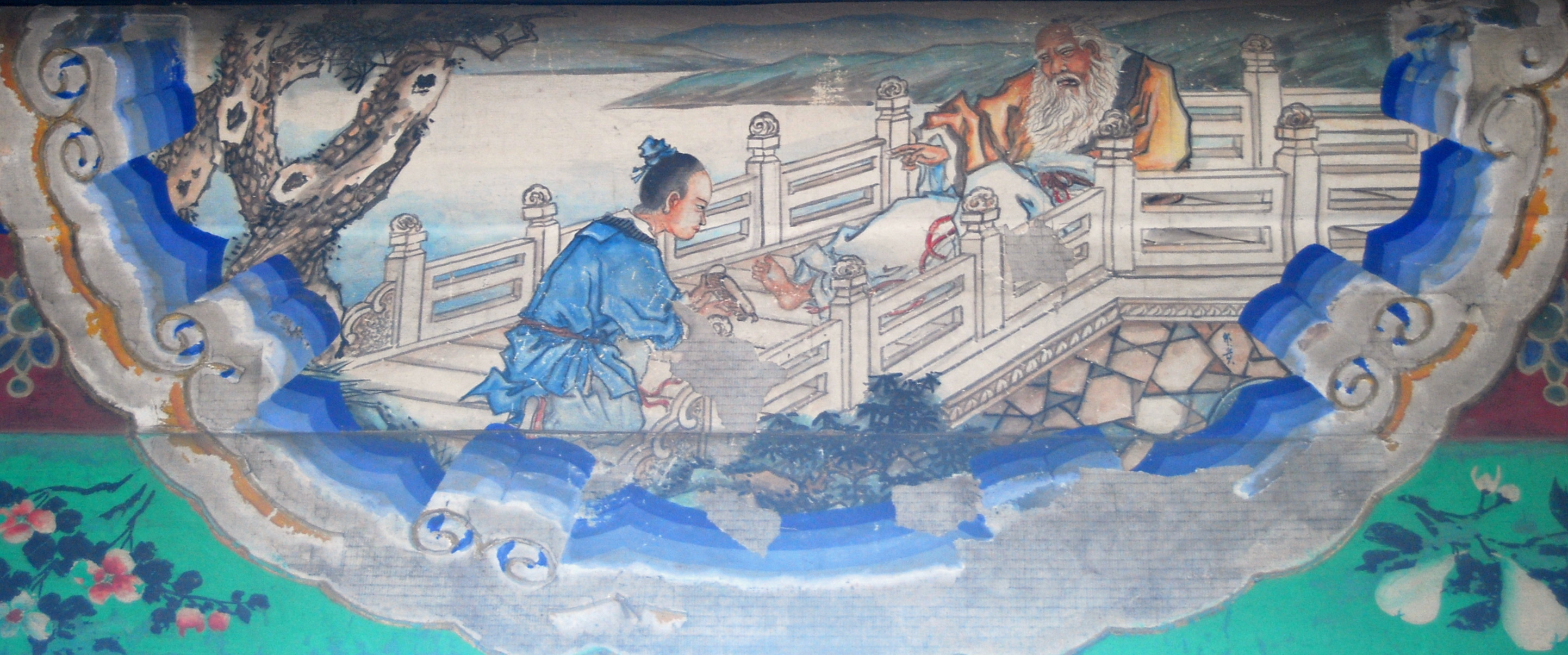
An illustration of Zhang Liang putting Huang Shigong's shoe back on at the Long Corridor of the Summer Palace, Beijing.

As a wanted man by the government, Zhang Liang travelled to Xiapi and stayed there for some time, using fake identities to evade the authorities. One day, Zhang Liang took a stroll at Yishui Bridge and met an old man there. The man walked towards Zhang Liang and chucked his shoe down the bridge on purpose, after which he yelled at Zhang, "Hey boy, go down and fetch me my shoe!" Zhang Liang was astonished and unhappy but obeyed silently. The old man then lifted his foot and ordered Zhang Liang to put on the shoe for him. Zhang Liang was furious, but he controlled his temper and meekly obliged. The man did not show any sign of gratitude and walked away laughing.

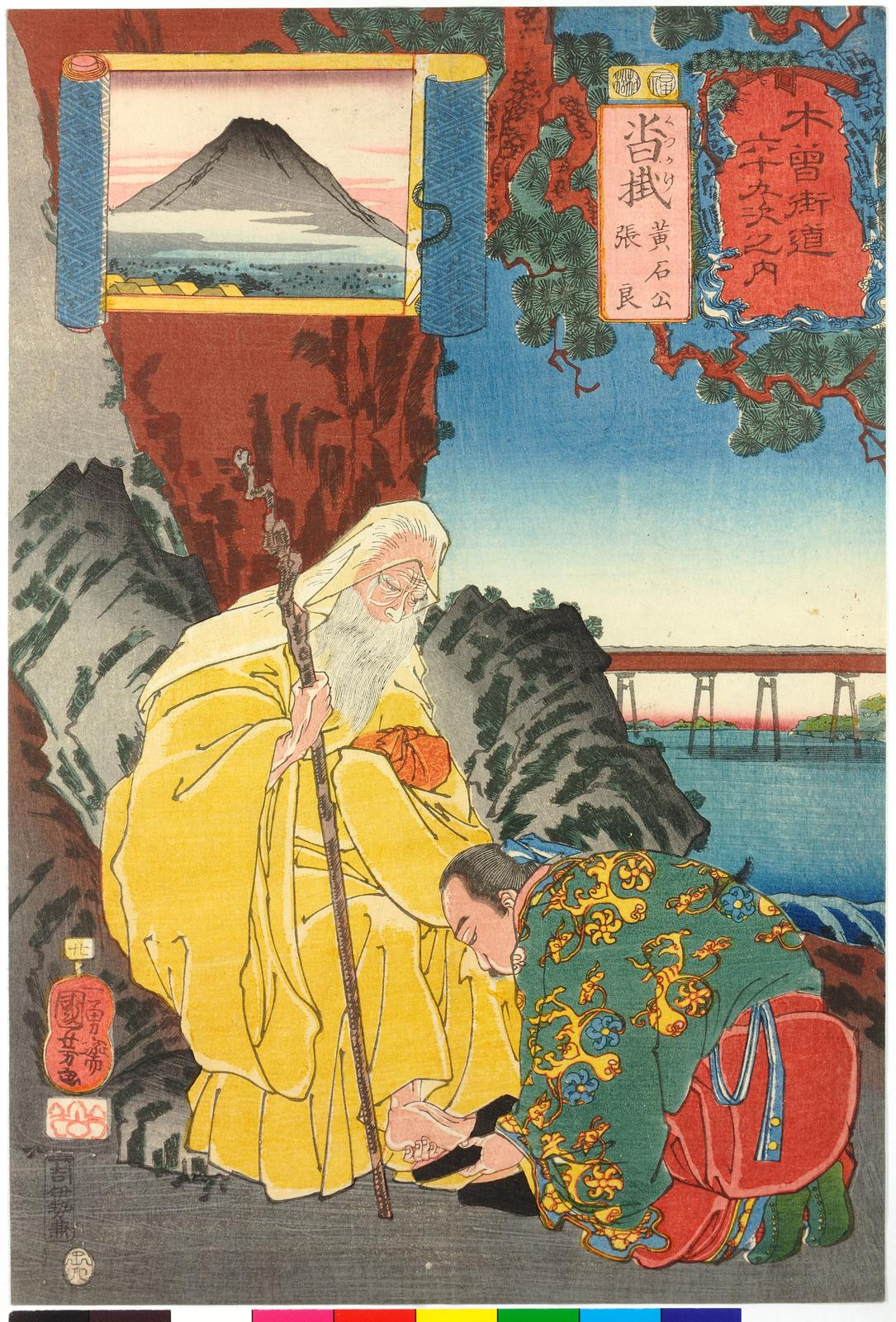
A Japan-style woodblock print of Zhang Liang returning the shoe to the hermit Huang Shigong by Utagawa Kuniyoshi at the British Museum.

The old man came back after walking a distance and praised Zhang Liang, "This child can be taught!" and asked Zhang Liang to meet him at the bridge again at dawn five days later. Zhang Liang was confused but agreed. Five days later, Zhang Liang rushed to the bridge at the stroke of dawn, but the old man was already waiting for him there. The old man chided him, "How can you be late for a meeting with an elderly man? Come back again five days later!" Zhang Liang tried his best to be punctual the second time, but the old man still arrived earlier than him, and he was scorned by the old man once more and told to return again five days later. The third time, Zhang Liang went to the bridge at midnight and waited until the old man appeared. This time, the old man was so impressed with Zhang Liang's fortitude and humility that he presented Zhang with a book, saying, "You can become the tutor of a ruler after reading this book. Within ten years, the world will become chaotic. You can then use your knowledge from this book to bring peace and prosperity to the empire. Meet me again 13 years later. I'm the yellow rock at the foot of Mount Gucheng."

The old man was Huang Shigong. The book was titled The Art of War by Taigong (太公兵法) and believed to be the Six Secret Teachings by Jiang Ziya, while some called it Three Strategies of Huang Shigong. In legend, Zhang Liang returned to the indicated site 13 years later and did see a yellow rock there. He built a shrine to worship the rock. After Zhang Liang's death, he was buried with the yellow stone. His descendants also pay homage to the yellow stone when visiting his grave during the Double Ninth Festival and the Winter Solstice.

According to the Collection of Lost Records of Immortals (仙传拾遗), after Zhang Liang helped Liu Bang establish the Han dynasty, he practiced self-cultivation using the book given to him by Huang Shigong. He refined his qi, stopped eating, and his body became light, ultimately ascending to heaven and becoming the Taixuan Tongzi (太玄童子) who often attended the Taishang Laojun.

=== In Journey to the West ===
In the 16th-century Chinese novel Journey to the West, there is a mention of his encounter with Zhang Liang. When Sun Wukong found himself in a heated argument with his master, Tang Sanzang, he decided to part ways and soar through the realms. Upon reaching the East Sea, he received an invitation from the Dragon King of the East Sea. Inside the palace, a painting titled "Three Entrances to the Bridge" caught his eye. He inquired about its meaning, prompting the Dragon King to tell a tale.

The Dragon King recounted, "At the end of the Qin dynasty, Zhang Liang encountered Huang Shigong on a bridge. To gauge his potential, Huang Shigong deliberately knocked off his shoe three times, each time falling beneath the bridge, testing Zhang Liang's patience. Though tempted to anger, Zhang Liang maintained respect for the elder. Impressed by his diligence, Huang Shigong secretly imparted a heavenly book to him under the cover of night. This knowledge later enabled Zhang Liang to assist Liu Bang in establishing the Han dynasty. After achieving peace, Zhang Liang relinquished his position, retreated to the mountains, embraced the Daoist path, and ultimately attained immortality."

Concluding the tale, the Dragon King advised Sun Wukong, stating, "The Great Sage, if you do not protect Tang Sanzang and heed his guidance, you will not attain enlightenment and will remain merely a demon. Return to your master." Moved by the story, Sun Wukong returned to Tang Sanzang's side.

== Worship ==
Huang Shigong is worshipped as a deity in Chinese folk religion and Taoism.

== In popular culture ==
- Huangshi Village, also known as Yellow Stone Village in Wulingyuan, Zhangjiajie, Hunan Province, was named after Huang Shigong.
- Zhang Liang's encounter with Huang Shigong had also become one of the classic Chinese folk tales about humility for later generations to learn from.
