= Lingqijing =

Chinese book of divination

Ling Qi Jing Classic of the Divine Chess

Chinese name
- Traditional Chinese: 靈棋經
- Simplified Chinese: 灵棋经
- Hanyu Pinyin: Língqíjīng
- Literal meaning: "Classic of the Divine Chess"
Transcriptions
Standard Mandarin
- Hanyu Pinyin: Língqíjīng
Yue: Cantonese
- Jyutping: Ling^{4} kei^{4} ging^{1}
Southern Min
- Hokkien POJ: ... (col.)... (lit.)

North Korean name
- Chosŏn'gŭl: 령기경
Transcriptions
- Revised Romanization: ryeonggigyeong

South Korean name
- Hangul: 영기경
Transcriptions
- Revised Romanization: yeonggigyeong

Japanese name
- Hiragana: れいききょう
- Kyūjitai: 靈棋經
- Shinjitai: 霊棋経

Lingqijing (or Ling Ch'i Ching; 靈棋經 lit. "Classic of the Divine Chess") is a Chinese book of divination. It is not known when, nor by whom, it was written, though a legend has spread that strategist Zhang Liang received the book from Huang Shigong (黃石公), a semi-mythological figure in Chinese history. The first commented edition of the work appeared in the Jin Dynasty.

As its name suggests, the work concerns "divining" with tokens, such as Chinese chess (xiangqi i.e.象棋) pieces (instead of with the more traditional turtle shells or yarrow stalks used in I Ching divination).

Twelve Xiangqi pieces (Note: As can be seen in entry "Xiangqi", none of the characters 下, 中, or 上 occur actually as characters on Xiangqi pieces. The pieces for Lingqijing look like Xiangqi pieces, except for bearing these special characters.) are used; each piece is a disc with a character on one side, and the other side unmarked. Four have the character for "up" (上, pronounced shang), four have the character for "middle" (中, zhong), and four have the character for "down" (下, xia), representing respectively the Three Realms: Heaven (天, tian), Humanity (人, ren), and Earth (地, di).

These pieces are cast onto a surface, and the text of the Lingqijing which contains the resulting combination tells what fortune the combination means.

The text of the Lingqijing has an entry for all 125 combinations (i.e., three kinds of pieces, times the five possibilities for each kind: one through four pieces landing face up, or none).

== See also ==
- I Ching - the most famous Chinese oracle, much more complex than the Lingqijing
- Taixuanjing - similar to the I Ching
- Xiangqi - the board game that is commonly called Chinese chess
- Qi Men Dun Jia - a divination/astrology
- Zhang Liang - a purported author of the Lingqijing
- Three Strategies of Huang Shigong - another work by another purported author/editor of the Lingqijing.
