= Bušan =

Qing military officer (fl. 17th century)

Bušan (Manchu: ᠪᡠᡧᠠᠨ, romanized: Bušan; d. 1645) was an early Qing statesman and military commander of the Irgen Gioro clan of the Manchu Bordered Red Banner. He was the third son of G'ag'ai, one of the creators of the Manchu script, and served as a Deliberative Minister (議政大臣) during the early Qing period.

== Biography ==
During the reign of Hong Taiji, Bušan was appointed jalan i janggin in the elite Bayara troops (護軍參領) and nirui janggin. Before long, he served as acting Commander of the Imperial Guards and was elevated to the rank of Deliberative Minister. In 1640, he defeated Ming cavalry forces from Xingshan near Jinzhou. The following year, he participated in the Battle of Songshan. When the Ming commander-in-chief Hong Chengchou advanced with an army of 130,000 men to relieve the besieged forces, Bušan personally led the Qing troops in fierce combat against the Ming reinforcements. After nightfall, the Ming army, having exhausted its provisions, began to retreat. Qing forces intercepted the withdrawal, and Bušan relentlessly pursued the retreating troops, killing and capturing a vast number of enemy soldiers. In 1643, he accompanied Prince Jirgalang in the capture of Qiantunwei (前屯衛) and Zhongqiansuo Fortress (中前所城). In 1644, he followed Imperial Regent Dorgon through Shanhai Pass into China proper. For his contributions to the campaign against Li Zicheng, he was awarded the hereditary position of niru ejen and the hereditary rank of baitalabure hafan. In 1645, while advancing into the south of Yangtze River with the Qing army, Bušan died of illness in the military garrison.

Bušan's eldest brother was Ušan, one of the Sixteen Ministers (十六大臣). His son was Kūwaja, who later served as a Banner Commander (都統).
