= Qapqal Xibe Autonomous County =

Qapqal County 察布查尔县 ᠴᠠᠪᠴᠠᠯᠰᡳᠶᠠᠨ چاپچال ناھىيىسى شاپشال اۋدانى
- Autonomous county
- Qapqal Xibe Autonomous County 察布查尔锡伯自治县 ᠴᠠᠪᠴᠠᠯᠰᡞᠪᡝᠪᡝᠶᡝᡩᠠᠰᠠᡢᡤᠠᠰᡞᠶᠠᠨ چاپچال شىبە ئاپتونوم ناھىيىسى شاپشال سىبە اۆتونوميالىق اۋدانى
- Clockwise from top: Weizhen Tower, Guandi Temple of Niru, Guandi Temple of Sunjaci Niru, Jingyuan Temple

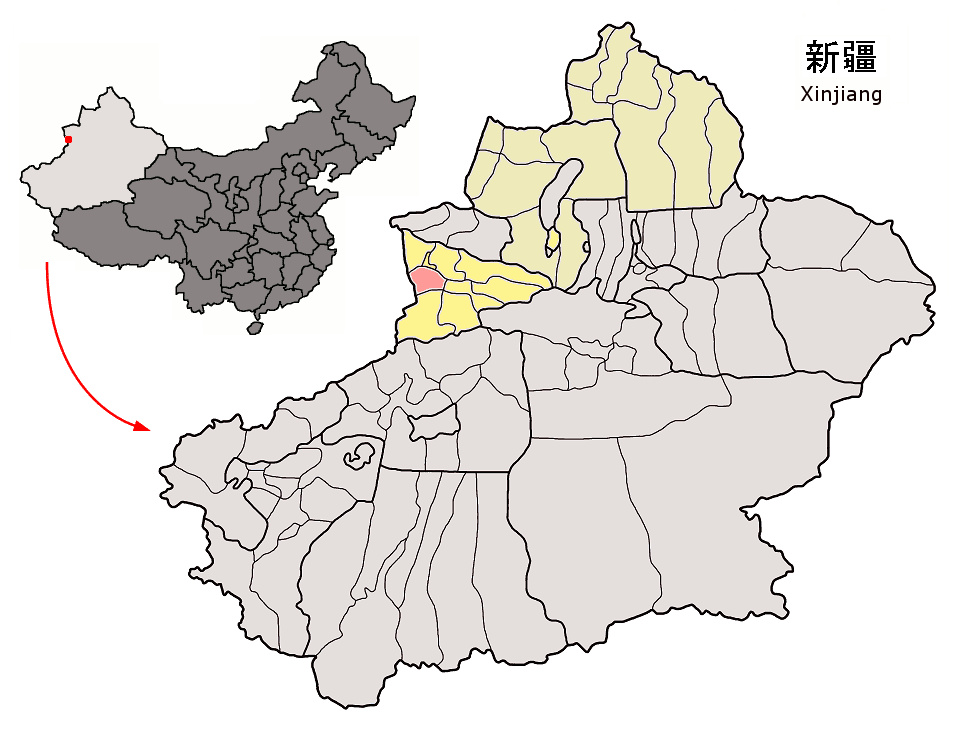
- Location of Qapqal Xibe Autonomous County (pink) in Ili Kazakh Autonomous Prefecture

- Location of the seat in Xinjiang Qapqal (Xinjiang) Qapqal (China)
- Coordinates (Qapqal County government): 43°50′27″N 81°09′05″E
- Country: China
- Autonomous region: Xinjiang
- Autonomous prefecture: Ili
- County seat: Cabcal Town

Area
  - Total: 4,469.36 km^{2} (1,725.63 sq mi)

Population (2020)
  - Total: 157,764
  - Density: 35.2990/km^{2} (91.4240/sq mi)
- Time zone: UTC+8 (CST (Note: Locals in Xinjiang frequently observe UTC+6 (Xinjiang Time), 2 hours behind Beijing.))
- Website: www.xjcbcr.gov.cn

Qapqal Xibe Autonomous County

Chinese name
- Simplified Chinese: 察布查尔锡伯自治县
- Traditional Chinese: 察布查爾錫伯自治縣
Transcriptions
Standard Mandarin
- Hanyu Pinyin: Chábùchá'ěr Xībó Zìzhìxiàn
- Wade–Giles: Chʻa^{2}-pu^{4}-chʻa^{2}-êrh^{3} Hsi^{1}-po^{2} Tzŭ^{4}-chih^{4}-hsien^{4}

Alternative Chinese name
- Simplified Chinese: 宁西县
- Traditional Chinese: 寧西縣
Transcriptions
Standard Mandarin
- Hanyu Pinyin: Níngxī Xiàn
- Wade–Giles: Ning^{2}-hsi^{1} Hsien^{4}

Uyghur name
- Uyghur: چاپچال شىبە ئاپتونوم ناھىيىسى
Transcriptions
- Latin Yëziqi: Chapchal Shibe Aptonom Nahiyisi

Kazakh name
- Kazakh: شاپشال سىبە اۆتونوميالىق اۋدانى; Шапшал сібе автономиялық ауданы Şapşal Sıbe avtonomialyq audany

Xibe name
- Xibe: ᠴᠠᠪᠴᠠᠯᠰᡞᠪᡝᠪᡝᠶᡝᡩᠠᠰᠠᡢᡤᠠᠰᡞᠶᠠᠨ; Cabcal Sibe beye dasangga siyan

Qapqal Xibe Autonomous County (Chinese: 察布查尔锡伯自治县; pinyin: Chábùchá'ěr Xībó Zìzhìxiàn; Xibe: ᠴᠠᠪᠴᠠᠯᠰᡞᠪᡝᠪᡝᠶᡝᡩᠠᠰᠠᡢᡤᠠᠰᡞᠶᠠᠨ, “Cabcal Sibe beye dasangga siyan”, also transliterated as Chapchal; Uyghur: چاپچال شىبە ئاپتونوم ناھىيىسى; Kazakh: شاپشال سىبە اۆتونوميالىق اۋدانى) in Ili Kazakh Autonomous Prefecture in northern Xinjiang. The only Xibe autonomous county of China, Qapqal borders Kazakhstan's Almaty Region to the west, has an area of 4,430 square kilometers and a population of 160,000 (2000).

== Etymology ==
Qapqal means "the granary" in the Xibe language.

== History ==
The Xibe, sent to garrison the area by the Qing dynasty, were divided into eight niru (companies); each niru established a settlement. The settlements are thus simply referred to as "First Niru" through "Eighth Niru", with the exception of the settlement established by the Sixth, which came to be known as Qapqal, thus giving the county its name.

== Subdivisions ==
Qapqal administered 7 towns, 5 townships, and 1 ethnic township.

Name	Simplified Chinese	Hanyu Pinyin	Xibe	Möllendorff transliteration	Uyghur (UEY)	Uyghur Latin (ULY)	Kazakh (Arabic script)	Kazakh (Cyrillic script)	Administrative division code
Towns
Cabcal Town	察布查尔镇	Chábùchá'ěr Zhèn	ᠴᠠᠪᠴᠠᠯ ᡪᡝᠨ	cabcal jen	چاپچال بازىرى	chapchal baziri	شاپشال قالاشىعى	Шапшал қалашығы	654022100
Aisin Šeri Town	爱新色里镇	Àixīnsèlǐ Zhèn	ᠠᡞᠰᡞᠨ ᡧᡝᠷᡞ ᡪᡝᠨ	aisin šeri jen	ئايشىن سىرى بازىرى	Ayshin siri baziri	ءايشىنى سىرى قالاشىعى	Әйшіні Сыры қалашығы	654022101
Sunjaci Niru Town (5th Niru)	孙扎齐牛录镇	Sūnzhāqíniúlù Zhèn	ᠰᡠᠨᡪᠠᠴᡞ ᠨᡞᠷᡠ ᡪᡝᠨ	sunjaci niru jen	سۇنجاچىنىرۇ بازىرى	sunjachiniru baziri	بەسسۇمىن قالاشىعى	Бессүмін қалашығы	654022102
Cohor Town	绰霍尔镇	Chuòhuò'ěr Zhèn	ᠴᠣᡥᠣᠷ ᡪᡝᠨ	cohor jen	چوقۇر بازىرى	choqur baziri	شوعىر قالاشىعى	Шоғыр қалашығы	654022103
Jahūstai Town	加尕斯台镇	Jiāgǎsītái Zhèn	ᡪᠠᡥᡡᠰᡨᠠᡞ ᡪᡝᠨ	jahūstai jen	جاغىستاي بازىرى	jaghistay baziri	جاعىستاي قالاشىعى	Жағыстай қалашығы	654022104
Amba Boro Town	琼博拉镇	Qióngbólā Zhèn	ᠠᠮᠪᠠ ᠪᠣᠷᠣ ᡪᡝᠨ	amba boro jen	چوڭ بۇغرا بازىرى	chong bughra baziri	ۇلكەن بۋرا قالاشىعى	Үлкен Бура қалашығы	654022105
Hainuk Town	海努克镇	Hǎinǔkè Zhèn	ᡥᠠᡞᠨᡠᡣ ᡪᡝᠨ	hainuk jen	قاينۇق بازىرى	qaynuq baziri	قاينۇق قالاشىعى	Қайнұқ қалашығы	654022106
Townships
Dūici Niru Township (4th Niru)	堆齐牛录乡	Duīqíniúlù Xiāng	ᡩᡡᡞᠴᡞ ᠨᡞᠷᡠ ᡤᡡᠰᠠ	dūici niru gūsa	دۇيچىنىرۇ يېزىسى	duychiniru yëzisi	‌ءتورتسۇمىن اۋىلى	Төртсүмін ауылы	654022200
Nadaci Niru Township (7th Niru)	纳达齐牛录乡	Nàdáqíniúlù Xiāng	ᠨᠠᡩᠠᠴᡞ ᠨᡞᠷᡠ ᡤᡡᠰᠠ	nadaci niru gūsa	ناداچىنىرۇ يېزىسى	nadachiniru yëzisi	سەگىزسۇمىن اۋىلى	Сегізсүмін ауылы	654022203
Jakūci Niru Township (8th Niru)	扎库齐牛录乡	Zhākùqíniúlù Xiāng	ᡪᠠᡣᡡᠴᡞ ᠨᡞᠷᡠ ᡤᡡᠰᠠ	jakūci niru gūsa	جاقۇچىنىرۇ يېزىسى	jaquchiniru yëzisi	جاقۇشنىرۇ اۋىلى	Жақұшнырұ ауылы	654022204
Kan Township	坎乡	Kǎn Xiāng	ᠺᠠᠨ ᡤᡡᠰᠠ	kʹan gūsa	كان يېزىسى	kan yëzisi	كان اۋىلى	Кән ауылы	654022206
Gohūnci Township	阔洪奇乡	Kuòhóngqí Xiāng	ᡤᠣᡥᡡᠨᠴᡞ ᡤᡡᠰᠠ	gohūnci gūsa	قوغۇنچى يېزىسى	qoghunchi yëzisi	قوعۇنچى اۋىلى	Қоғұнчы ауылы	654022207
Ethnic Townships
Miliangquan Hui Township	米粮泉回族乡	Mǐliángquán huízú xiāng	ᠮᡞ ᠯᡞᠶᠠᡢ ᠴᡞᠣᠸᠠᠨ ᡥᡡᡞᡥᡡᡞ ᡠᡴᠰᡠᡵᠠᡞ ᡤᡡᠰᠠ	mi liyaŋ ciowan hūihūi uksurai gūsa	مىلياڭچۈەن خۇيزۇ يېزىسى	qoghunchi yëzisi	مىلەڭچۇەن حۇيزۋ ۇلتتىق اۋىلى	Мілеңчүен хуйзу ұлттық ауылы	654022205

- 169th Regiment of the XPCC (Chinese: 兵团六十九团) (Uyghur: 69-تۇەن مەيدانى) (Kazakh: 69-تۋان الاڭىنداعى) (Xibe: 69 ᠴᡞᡨᠣᠸᠠᠨᠴᠠᡢ)
- Ambanbaq Breeding grounds (Chinese: 安班巴格良繁场) (Uyghur: ئامبانباغ نەسىللىك كۆپەيتىش مەيدانى) (Kazakh: امبانباق سورتتى تۇقىم جەتىلدىرۋ الاڭىنداعى) (Xibe: ᠠᠮᠪᠠᠨᠪᠠᡤᡝᠰᠠᡞ᠋ᠨᡠᠰᡝᡫᡠᠰᡝᠮᠪᡠᠷᡝᡫᠠᠯᡝᠨ)
- Dolat Port of Entry (Chinese: 都拉塔口岸) (Uyghur: دولات پورتى) (Kazakh: دۋلاتى وتكەلى)
- Ili Prefectural Forestry Field (Chinese: 伊犁州平原林场) (Uyghur: ئىلى ۋىلايەتلىك تۈزلەڭلىك ئورمانچىلىق مەيدانى) (Kazakh: ىلە ايماقتىق ورمان شارۋاشىلىعى الاڭىنداعى)
- Mountain Area Forest Farm (Chinese: 山区林场) (Uyghur: تاغ رايونى ئورمانچىلىق مەيدانى) (Kazakh: تاۋلى ولكەسى ورمان الاڭىنداعى) (Xibe: ᠠᠯᡞᠨᠪᠠᡞᠪᡠᡪᠠᠨᡥᡝᠷᡝ)

== Demographics ==
Demographics per niru (2000)
Number	Xibe name	Chinese name	% Xibe	% Han	% Other	Population	Number of villages	Source
1	Uju Niru	乌珠牛录乡	61.8	20.9	17.3			
2	Jai Niru	扎依牛录乡	72.2	15.5	12.3			
3	Ilaci Niru	依拉齐牛录乡	73.2	12.3	14.5			
4	Duici Niru	堆依齐牛录乡	32.9	28.4	38.7			
5	Sunjaci Niru	孙扎齐牛录镇	38.2	15	46.8	8033	4	
6	Ningguci Niru or Capcal	察布查尔镇	29	32	39			
7	Nadaci Niru	纳达齐牛录乡	41.6	32	24.6			
8	Jakûci Niru	扎库齐牛录乡	72.2	15.5	12.3	13,000	5	

== Climate ==
Climate data for Qapqal, elevation 603 m (1,978 ft), (1991–2020 normals, extremes 1991–present)
Month	Jan	Feb	Mar	Apr	May	Jun	Jul	Aug	Sep	Oct	Nov	Dec	Year
Record high °C (°F)	8.8 (47.8)	16.8 (62.2)	28.3 (82.9)	34.9 (94.8)	36.6 (97.9)	37.2 (99.0)	40.7 (105.3)	39.1 (102.4)	37.7 (99.9)	31.5 (88.7)	24.8 (76.6)	15.5 (59.9)	40.7 (105.3)
Mean daily maximum °C (°F)	−2.5 (27.5)	1.1 (34.0)	11.9 (53.4)	21.6 (70.9)	26.4 (79.5)	30.3 (86.5)	32.2 (90.0)	31.1 (88.0)	26.5 (79.7)	18.8 (65.8)	8.8 (47.8)	0.1 (32.2)	17.2 (62.9)
Daily mean °C (°F)	−9.2 (15.4)	−5.0 (23.0)	5.0 (41.0)	13.5 (56.3)	18.5 (65.3)	22.6 (72.7)	24.1 (75.4)	22.7 (72.9)	17.5 (63.5)	9.9 (49.8)	2.0 (35.6)	−5.6 (21.9)	9.7 (49.4)
Mean daily minimum °C (°F)	−14.5 (5.9)	−10.3 (13.5)	−0.7 (30.7)	6.6 (43.9)	11.6 (52.9)	15.9 (60.6)	17.4 (63.3)	15.6 (60.1)	10.1 (50.2)	3.4 (38.1)	−2.5 (27.5)	−10.0 (14.0)	3.6 (38.4)
Record low °C (°F)	−31.4 (−24.5)	−31.7 (−25.1)	−20.9 (−5.6)	−8.0 (17.6)	−1.3 (29.7)	5.5 (41.9)	8.8 (47.8)	4.5 (40.1)	−1.6 (29.1)	−8.4 (16.9)	−17.1 (1.2)	−33.2 (−27.8)	−33.2 (−27.8)
Average precipitation mm (inches)	18.2 (0.72)	17.7 (0.70)	14.5 (0.57)	23.7 (0.93)	23.3 (0.92)	22.5 (0.89)	24.3 (0.96)	17.3 (0.68)	11.8 (0.46)	19.3 (0.76)	26.5 (1.04)	22.2 (0.87)	241.3 (9.5)
Average precipitation days (≥ 0.1 mm)	7.6	6.8	6.1	7.5	7.6	8.4	7.9	5.5	4.8	5.4	7.0	8.2	82.8
Average snowy days	9.4	8.2	3.0	0.6	0.1	0	0	0	0	0.4	3.9	9.4	35
Average relative humidity (%)	80	79	69	57	54	56	58	59	60	69	78	82	67
Mean monthly sunshine hours	142.2	162.2	227.7	257.5	304.1	310.1	327.3	310.7	269.7	222.3	143.2	123.6	2,800.6
Percentage possible sunshine	49	54	61	63	66	67	71	73	74	67	50	45	62
Source: China Meteorological Administrationall-time extreme temperature

== Media ==
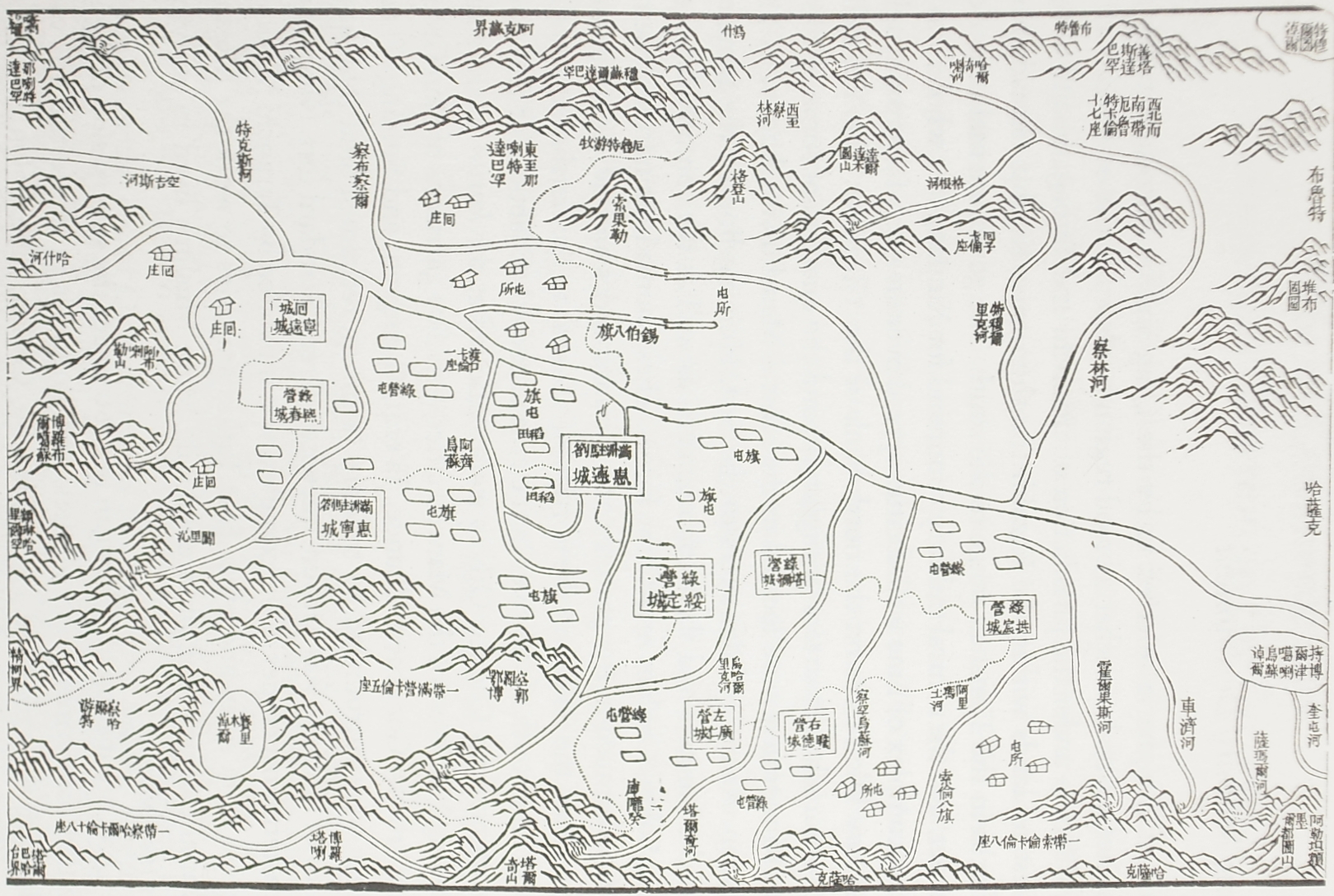
A ca. 1809 map of the Ili Region (the map is drawn "upside down": the south is on top) showing the Xibo Eight Banners (锡伯八旗) stationed across the Ili River from the Manchu Fort Huiyuan (惠远城), exactly where Qapqal Xibe Autonomous County is nowadays. There is a place - or perhaps a river - named "察布察儿" (Chabucha'er, Chinese: 察布查爾) in that area as well.

The county has one Xibe language newspaper, the Qapqal News. A television station broadcasts a few programmes in Xibe monthly, with the rest of all programmes being broadcast in Mandarin, Uyghur and Kazakh.
