= Erdeni =

Manchu name
- Manchu script: ᡝᡵᡩᡝ᠋ᠨᡳ
- Möllendorff: erdeni

Chinese name
- Chinese: 额尔德尼
Transcriptions
Standard Mandarin
- Hanyu Pinyin: é ěr dé ní

Erdeni Baksi (1592–1634) was a Manchu official, linguist, and scholar of the Plain Yellow Banner in the early Qing dynasty. Originally a member of the Nara clan, he was later granted the surname Hešeri by Hong Taiji. Because of his outstanding proficiency in Mongolian and Chinese, Nurhaci bestowed upon him the scholar title Baksi. Together with G'ag'ai, Erdeni is credited with creating the Old Manchu script, providing the Jurchen-Manchu people with a native writing system after the earlier Jurchen script had fallen out of use.

== Biography ==
Born in Duyengge, Erdeni joined Nurhaci's forces at a young age. He accompanied military expeditions against the Mongols, where his linguistic ability enabled him to issue proclamations and persuade enemy groups to surrender, earning him the Baksi title. In 1599, Nurhaci ordered Erdeni and G'ag'ai to create a writhing system for the Manchu language based on the Mongolian alphabet. After G'ag'ai was soon executed for the involvement of former Hada ruler Menggebulu's conspiracy against Nurhaci, Erdeni completed the project alone. The resulting script, later known as the Old Manchu script or script without dots and circles, became the official writing system of the Later Jin Khanate and was later revised by Dahai Baksi into the finalized standard Manchu script.

Erdeni also assisted on establishing the institutions of the Later Jin after its founding in 1616. During Nurhaci's 1618 campaign against the Ming, he participated in the defeat of the Ming commander Zhang Chengyin (張承胤) and was rewarded with the hereditary rank of Baron. In 1634, Erdeni was placed in charge of receiving more than 5,000 Chahar households that had submitted to the Qing. Later that year, however, he was executed for embezzling tribute pearls.

Despite his downfall, Hong Taiji praised him as "an outstanding man of his generation" granted him the Hešeri surname to become clansmen of Šose Baksi originated from Duyengge as well. In 1654, the Shunzhi Emperor granted Erdeni along with Dahai the posthumous name Wencheng (文成, "Cultured and Accomplished") in recognition of their foundational contributions to the creation of the Manchu script.
