= Wu Qian (basketball, born 1986) =

Chinese basketball player

Personal information
- Born: July 21, 1986 (age 40) Beijing, China
- Listed height: 6 ft 9 in (2.06 m)

Career information
- Playing career: 2002–2010
- Position: Center
- Number: 13

Career history
- 2002–2010: Bayi Rockets

Wu Qian (Chinese: 吴谦, born 21 July 1986) is a retired Chinese basketball player. He represented China at the 2007 FIBA Asia Championship. He is an ethnic Sibe.
