= Manchu alphabet =

Alphabet used to write the Manchu language

Manchu script ᠮᠠᠨᠵᡠ ᡥᡝᡵᡤᡝᠨ manju hergen
- 18th-century manuscript
- Script type: Alphabet
- Languages: Manchu; Xibe

Related scripts
- Parent systems: Egyptian hieroglyphs: Proto-Sinaitic alphabet; Phoenician alphabet; Aramaic alphabet; Syriac alphabet; Sogdian alphabet; Old Uyghur alphabet; Mongolian script; Manchu script
- Child systems: Dagur alphabet; Xibe alphabet

ISO 15924
- ISO 15924: Mong (145), Mongolian

Unicode
- Unicode alias: Mongolian

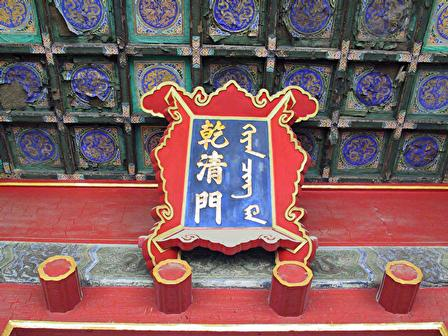
A bilingual sign in Chinese (left) and Manchu (right) in the Forbidden City

Manju hergen ("Manchu alphabet") in Manchu

The Manchu alphabet (Manchu: ᠮᠠᠨᠵᡠ ᡥᡝᡵᡤᡝᠨ, Möllendorff: manju hergen, Abkai: manju hergen) is the alphabet used to write the now critically endangered Manchu language. A similar script called Xibe script is used today by the Xibe people, whose language is considered either a dialect of Manchu or a closely related, mutually intelligible language. It is written vertically from top to bottom, with columns proceeding from left to right.

== History ==
=== Tongki fuka akū hergen ===
The Jurchens of a millennium ago became the ancestors of the Manchus when Nurhaci united the Jianzhou Jurchens (1593–1618) and his son subsequently renamed the consolidated tribes as the "Manchu". Throughout this period, the Jurchen language evolved into what we know as the Manchu language. The Jurchen script has no relation to the Manchu alphabet, as it was derived from the Khitan script, itself derived from Chinese characters. After the collapse of the Jin dynasty, the Jurchen script fell into disuse.

According to the Veritable Records (Manchu: ᠮᠠᠨᠵᡠ ᡳ ᠶᠠᡵᡤᡳᠶᠠᠨ ᡴᠣᠣᠯᡳ, romanized: manju i yargiyan kooli; Chinese: 滿洲實錄; pinyin: Mǎnzhōu Shílù), in 1599 the Jurchen leader Nurhaci decided to convert the Mongolian alphabet to make it suitable for the Manchu people. He decried the fact that while illiterate Han Chinese and Mongolians could understand their respective languages when read aloud, that was not the case for the Manchus, whose documents were recorded by Mongolian scribes. Overriding the objections of two advisors named Erdeni and G'ag'ai, he is credited with adapting the Mongolian script to Manchu. The resulting script was known as tongki fuka akū hergen (Manchu: ᡨ᠋ᠣᠩᡴᡳ ᡶ᠋ᡠᡴᠠ ᠠᡴᡡ ᡥᡝᡵᡤᡝᠨ) — the "script without dots and circles".

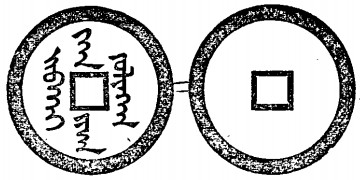
Coin of Nurhaci, reading Abkai fulingga han jiha, and written ᠠᠪᡴᠠᡳ ᡶ᠋ᠣᠯᡳᠩᡴᠠ ᡴᠠᠨ ᠵᡳᡴᠠ without diacritics (ᠠᠪᡴᠠᡳ ᡶ᠋ᡠᠯᡳᠩᡤᠠ ᡥᠠᠨ ᠵᡳᡥᠠ with later diacritics)

=== Tongki fuka sindaha hergen ===
In 1632, Dahai added diacritical marks to clear up a lot of the ambiguity present in the original Mongolian script; for instance, a leading k, g, and h are distinguished by the placement of no diacritical mark, a dot, and a circle, respectively. This revision created the standard script, known as tongki fuka sindaha hergen (Manchu: ᡨ᠋ᠣᠩᡴᡳ ᡶ᠋ᡠᡴᠠ ᠰᡳᠨ᠋ᡩ᠋ᠠᡥᠠ ᡥᡝᡵᡤᡝᠨ) — the "script with dots and circles". As a result, the Manchu alphabet contains little ambiguity. Recently discovered manuscripts from the 1620s make clear, however, that the addition of dots and circles to Manchu script began before their supposed introduction by Dahai.

Dahai also added the tulergi hergen ("foreign/outer letters"): ten graphemes to facilitate Manchu to be used to write Chinese, Sanskrit, and Tibetan loanwords. Previously, these non-Manchu sounds did not have corresponding letters in Manchu. Sounds that were transliterated included the aspirated sounds k' (Chinese pinyin: k, ᠺ), k (g, ᡬ), x (h, ᡭ); ts' (c, ᡮ); ts (ci, ᡮ᠊ᡟ); sy (si, ᠰ᠊ᡟ); dz (z, ᡯ); c'y (chi, ᡱᡟ); j'y (zhi, ᡷᡟ); and ž (r, ᡰ).

=== 19th century – present ===
By the middle of the nineteenth century, there were three styles of writing Manchu in use: standard script (ginggulere hergen), semi-cursive script (gidara hergen), and cursive script (lasihire hergen). Semicursive script had less spacing between the letters, and cursive script had rounded tails.

The Manchu alphabet was also used to write Chinese. The way in which this was done is explained in Manchu: a Textbook for Reading Documents, which has a comparative table of romanizations of Chinese syllables written in Manchu letters, Hànyǔ Pīnyīn and Wade–Giles. Using the Manchu script to transliterate Chinese words is a source of loanwords for the Xibe language. Several Chinese-Manchu dictionaries contain Chinese characters transliterated with Manchu script. The Manchu versions of the Thousand Character Classic and Dream of the Red Chamber are actually the Manchu transcription of all the Chinese characters.

In the Imperial Liao-Jin-Yuan Three Histories National Language Explanation (欽定遼金元三史國語解 Qinding Liao Jin Yuan sanshi guoyujie) commissioned by the Qianlong Emperor, the Manchu alphabet is used to write Evenki (Solon) words. In the Pentaglot Dictionary, also commissioned by the Qianlong Emperor, the Manchu alphabet is used to transcribe Tibetan and Chagatai (related to Uyghur) words.

== Alphabet ==
Characters				Transliteration	Notes
isolated	initial	medial	final	Transliteration	Notes
Vowels
ᠠ	ᠠ᠊	᠊ᠠ᠊	᠊ᠠ	a [a]	A second final form is used after b (᠊ᠪᠠ ba) and p (᠊ᡦᠠ pa).
ᡝ	ᡝ᠊	᠊ᡝ᠊	᠊ᡝ	e [ə]	A second final form is used after b (᠊ᠪᡝ be) and p (᠊ᡦᡝ pe).
ᡝ	ᡝ᠊	᠊ᡝ᠋᠊	᠊ᡝ᠋	e [ə]	The undotted medial form is used after k, g, h , d and t. The final form is used after t (᠊ᡨᡝ te). A second final form is used after k (᠊ᡴᡝ ka), g (᠊ᡤᡝ ga), and h (᠊ᡥᡝ ha).
ᡳ	ᡳ᠊	᠊ᡳ᠊	᠊ᡳ	i [i]	The second isolated form serves as genitive case marker. The second medial form is used after vowels.
ᡳ ⟨⟩	ᡳ᠊	᠊ᡳ᠌᠊	᠊ᡳ	i [i]	The second isolated form serves as genitive case marker. The second medial form is used after vowels.
ᠣ	ᠣ᠊	᠊ᠣ᠊	᠊ᠣ	o [ɔ]	The bow-less final form is used in single-syllable words only.
ᠣ	ᠣ᠊	᠊ᠣ᠊	᠊ᠣ᠋	o [ɔ]	The bow-less final form is used in single-syllable words only.
ᡠ	ᡠ᠊	᠊ᡠ᠊	᠊ᡠ	u [u]	The dotless medial form is used after k, g, h, d, t. The bow-less final form is used in single-syllable words only.
ᡠ	ᡠ᠊	᠊ᡠ᠋᠊	dotted ᠊ᠣ᠋	u [u]	The dotless medial form is used after k, g, h, d, t. The bow-less final form is used in single-syllable words only.
ᡡ	ᡡ᠊	᠊ᡡ᠊	᠊ᡡ	ū/uu/v [ʊ]	Denotes u after k [qʰ], g [q], h [χ].
ᡟ	ᡟ	᠊ᡟ᠊	᠊ᡟ	y/y/i' [ɨ]	Used in Chinese loanwords.
ᡳᠣᡳ	ᡳᠣᡳ᠊^{⟨?⟩}	᠊ᡳᠣᡳ᠊^{⟨?⟩}	᠊ᡳᠣᡳ	ioi [y]	Used in Chinese loanwords.
Consonants
ᠨ	ᠨ᠊	᠊ᠨ᠋᠊	᠊ᠨ	n [n]	The dotted form is used before vowels; undotted form before consonants. A dotted final form is used in some words of chinese origin.
ᠨ	ᠨ᠊	᠊ᠨ᠊	᠊ᠨ	n [n]	The dotted form is used before vowels; undotted form before consonants. A dotted final form is used in some words of chinese origin.
ᠩ	—	᠊ᠩ᠊	᠊ᠩ	ng [ŋ]	The medial form is used before consonants.
ᡴ	ᡴ᠊	᠊ᡴ᠊	᠊ᡴ	k [qʰ]	The undotted medial form is used before a, o, ū; dotted form before consonants.
ᡴ	ᡴ᠊	᠊ᡴ᠋᠊	᠊ᡴ	k [qʰ]	The undotted medial form is used before a, o, ū; dotted form before consonants.
ᡴ	ᢉ᠊	᠊ᡴ᠌᠊	᠊ᡴ᠋	k [kʰ]	Initial and medial forms are used before e, i, u.
ᡤ	ᡤ᠊	᠊ᡤ᠊	—	g [q]	Used before a, o, ū.
ᡤ	ᡤ᠋᠊	ᡤ᠋᠊	—	g [k]	Used before e, i, u.
ᡥ	ᡥ᠊	᠊ᡥ᠊	—	h [χ]	Used before a, o, ū.
ᡥ			—	h [x]	Used before e, i, u.
ᠪ	ᠪ᠊	᠊ᠪ᠊	᠊ᠪ	b [p]	
ᡦ	ᡦ᠊	᠊ᡦ᠊	—	p [pʰ]	
ᠰ	ᠰ᠊	᠊ᠰ᠊	᠊ᠰ	s [s], [ɕ] before [i]	
ᡧ	ᡧ᠊	᠊ᡧ᠊	—	š [ʃ], [ɕ] before [i]	
ᡨ	ᡨ᠋᠊	᠊ᡨ᠋᠊	—	t [tʰ]	Used before a, o, ū, i.
ᡨ	—	᠊ᡨ᠌᠊	᠊ᡨ	t [tʰ]	Medial form is used before consonants.
ᡨ	ᡨ᠌᠊	᠊ᡨ᠍᠊	—	t [tʰ]	Used before e, u.
ᡩ	ᡩ᠊	᠊ᡩ᠋᠊	—	d [t]	Used before a, o, ū, i.
ᡩ	ᡩ᠋᠊	᠊ᡩ᠊	—	d [t]	Used before e, u.
ᠯ	ᠯ᠊	᠊ᠯ᠊	᠊ᠯ	l [l]	Initial and final forms usually exist in foreign words.
ᠮ	ᠮ᠊	᠊ᠮ᠊	᠊ᠮ	m [m]	
ᠴ	ᠴ᠊	᠊ᠴ᠊	—	c/ch/č/q [t͡ʃʰ], [t͡ɕʰ] before [i]	
ᠵ	ᠵ᠊	᠊ᠵ᠊	—	j/zh/ž [t͡ʃ], [t͡ɕ] before [i]	
ᠶ	ᠶ᠊	᠊ᠶ᠋᠊ ⟨⟩	—	y [j]	
ᠷ	ᡵ᠊	᠊ᡵ᠊	᠊ᡵ	r [r]	Initial and final forms exist mostly in foreign words.
ᡶ	ᡶ‍	‍ᡶ‍	—	f [f]	First initial and medial forms are used before a, e; second initial and medial forms are used before i, o, u, ū.
ᡶ	ᡶ᠋‍	‍ᡶ᠋‍	—	f [f]	First initial and medial forms are used before a, e; second initial and medial forms are used before i, o, u, ū.
ᠸ	ᠸ᠊	᠊ᠸ᠊	—	v (w) [w], [v]-	
ᠺ	ᠺ᠊	᠊ᠺ᠊	—	k'/kk/k‘/k’ [kʰ]	Used for Chinese k [kʰ]. Used before a, o.
ᡬ	ᡬ᠊	᠊ᡬ᠊	—	g'/gg/ǵ/g’ [k]	Used for Chinese g [k]. Used before a, o.
ᡭ	ᡭ᠊	᠊ᡭ᠊	—	h'/hh/h́/h’ [x]	Used in Chinese h [x]. Used before a, o.
ᡮ	ᡮ᠊	᠊ᡮ᠊	—	ts'/c/ts‘/c [tsʰ]	Used in Chinese c [t͡sʰ].
ᡯ	ᡯ᠊	᠊ᡯ᠊	᠊ᡯ	dz/z/dz/z [t͡s]	Used in Chinese z [t͡s].
ᡰ	ᡰ᠊	᠊ᡰ᠊	—	ž/rr/ž/r’ [ʐ]	Used in Chinese r [ʐ].
ᡱ	ᡱ᠊	᠊ᡱ᠊	—	c'/ch/c‘/c’ [tʂʰ]	Used in Chinese ch [tʂʰ] and chi/c'y [tʂʰɨ]
ᡷ	ᡷ᠊	᠊ᡷ᠊		j/zh/j̊/j’ [tʂ]	Used in Chinese zh [tʂ] and zhi/j'y [tʂɨ]

== Method of teaching ==
Despite its alphabetic nature, the Manchu "alphabet" was traditionally taught as a syllabary to reflect its phonotactics. Manchu children were taught to memorize the shapes of all the syllables in the language separately as they learned to write and say right away "la, lo", etc., instead of saying "l, a — la"; "l, o — lo"; etc. As a result, the syllables contained in their syllabary do not contain all possible combinations that can be formed with their letters. They made, for instance, no such use of the consonants l, m, n and r as English; hence if the Manchu letters s, m, a, r and t were joined in that order, a Manchu would not pronounce them as "smart".

Today, it is still divided among experts on whether the Manchu script is alphabetic or syllabic. In China, it is considered syllabic, and Manchu is still taught in this manner, while in the West it is treated like an alphabet. The alphabetic approach is used mainly by foreigners who want to learn the language, as studying the Manchu script as a syllabary takes longer.

=== Twelve uju ===
The syllables in Manchu are divided into twelve categories called uju (literally "head") based on their syllabic codas (final phonemes). Here lists the names of the twelve uju in their traditional order:

a, ai, ar, an, ang, ak, as, at, ab, ao, al, am.

Each uju contains syllables ending in the coda of its name. Hence, Manchu only allows nine final consonants for its closed syllables, otherwise a syllable is open with a monophthong (a uju) or a diphthong (ai uju and ao uju).The syllables in an uju are further sorted and grouped into three or two according to their similarities in pronunciation and shape. For example, a uju arranges its 131 licit syllables in the following order:

a, e, i; o, u, ū; na, ne, ni; no, nu, nū;

ka, ga, ha; ko, go, ho; kū, gū, hū;

ba, be, bi; bo, bu, bū; pa, pe, pi; po, pu, pū;

sa, se, si; so, su, sū; ša, še, ši; šo, šu, šū;

ta, da; te, de; ti, di; to, do; tu, du;

la, le, li; lo, lu, lū; ma, me, mi; mo, mu, mū;

ca, ce, ci; co, cu, cū; ja, je, ji; jo, ju, jū; ya, ye; yo, yu, yū;

ke, ge, he; ki, gi, hi; ku, gu, hu; k'a, g'a, h'a; k'o, g'o, h'o;

ra, re, ri; ro, ru, rū;

fa, fe, fi; fo, fu, fū; wa, we;

ts'a, ts'e, ts; ts'o, ts'u; dza, dze, dzi, dzo, dzu;

ža, že, ži; žo, žu; sy, c'y, jy.

In general, while syllables in the same row resemble each other phonetically and visually, syllables in the same group (as the semicolons separate) bear greater similarities.

== Punctuation ==
The Manchu alphabet has two kinds of punctuation: two dots (᠉), analogous to a period; and one dot (᠈), analogous to a comma. However, with the exception of lists of nouns being reliably punctuated by single dots, punctuation in Manchu is inconsistent, and therefore not of much use as an aid to readability.

The equivalent of the question mark in Manchu script consists of some special particles, written at the end of the question.

== Unicode ==
The Manchu alphabet is included in the Unicode block for Mongolian.

Mongolian^{[1]}^{[2]}^{[3]} Official Unicode Consortium code chart (PDF)
	0	1	2	3	4	5	6	7	8	9	A	B	C	D	E	F
U+180x	᠀	᠁	᠂	᠃	᠄	᠅	᠆	᠇	᠈	᠉	᠊	FVS; 1	FVS; 2	FVS; 3	MVS	FVS; 4
U+181x	᠐	᠑	᠒	᠓	᠔	᠕	᠖	᠗	᠘	᠙						
U+182x	ᠠ	ᠡ	ᠢ	ᠣ	ᠤ	ᠥ	ᠦ	ᠧ	ᠨ	ᠩ	ᠪ	ᠫ	ᠬ	ᠭ	ᠮ	ᠯ
U+183x	ᠰ	ᠱ	ᠲ	ᠳ	ᠴ	ᠵ	ᠶ	ᠷ	ᠸ	ᠹ	ᠺ	ᠻ	ᠼ	ᠽ	ᠾ	ᠿ
U+184x	ᡀ	ᡁ	ᡂ	ᡃ	ᡄ	ᡅ	ᡆ	ᡇ	ᡈ	ᡉ	ᡊ	ᡋ	ᡌ	ᡍ	ᡎ	ᡏ
U+185x	ᡐ	ᡑ	ᡒ	ᡓ	ᡔ	ᡕ	ᡖ	ᡗ	ᡘ	ᡙ	ᡚ	ᡛ	ᡜ	ᡝ	ᡞ	ᡟ
U+186x	ᡠ	ᡡ	ᡢ	ᡣ	ᡤ	ᡥ	ᡦ	ᡧ	ᡨ	ᡩ	ᡪ	ᡫ	ᡬ	ᡭ	ᡮ	ᡯ
U+187x	ᡰ	ᡱ	ᡲ	ᡳ	ᡴ	ᡵ	ᡶ	ᡷ	ᡸ							
U+188x	ᢀ	ᢁ	ᢂ	ᢃ	ᢄ	ᢅ	ᢆ	ᢇ	ᢈ	ᢉ	ᢊ	ᢋ	ᢌ	ᢍ	ᢎ	ᢏ
U+189x	ᢐ	ᢑ	ᢒ	ᢓ	ᢔ	ᢕ	ᢖ	ᢗ	ᢘ	ᢙ	ᢚ	ᢛ	ᢜ	ᢝ	ᢞ	ᢟ
U+18Ax	ᢠ	ᢡ	ᢢ	ᢣ	ᢤ	ᢥ	ᢦ	ᢧ	ᢨ	ᢩ	ᢪ					
Notes 1.As of Unicode version 18.0 2.Grey areas indicate non-assigned code points 3.The Unicode presentation form of U+1824 MONGOLIAN LETTER U is U+1824 FVS1 ᠤ᠋ Second Isolate Form, to distinguish it from the visually identical U+1823 MONGOLIAN LETTER O. For the same reason, the Unicode presentation form of U+1826 MONGOLIAN LETTER UE is U+1826 FVS2 ᠦ᠌ Third Isolate Form. See document N4752R2.

== See also ==
- Mongolian script
- Transliterations of Manchu
- Clear Script

== Bibliography ==
- Daniels, Peter T.; Bright, William (1996). The World's Writing Systems. Oxford University Press. ISBN 978-0-19-507993-7.
- Gorelova, Liliya M. (2002). Manchu Grammar. Brill. ISBN 90-04-12307-5.
- Li, Gertraude Roth (2000). Manchu: A Textbook for Reading Documents. University of Hawaii Press. ISBN 0-8248-2206-4.
- Li, Gertraude Roth (2010). Manchu: A Textbook for Reading Documents (Second ed.). National Foreign Language Resource Center. ISBN 978-0-9800459-5-6.
- Saarela, Marten Soderblom (2020). The Early Modern Travels of Manchu: A Script and Its Study in East Asia and Europe. University of Pennsylvania Press. ISBN 978-0-8122-9693-8.
