= G'ag'ai =

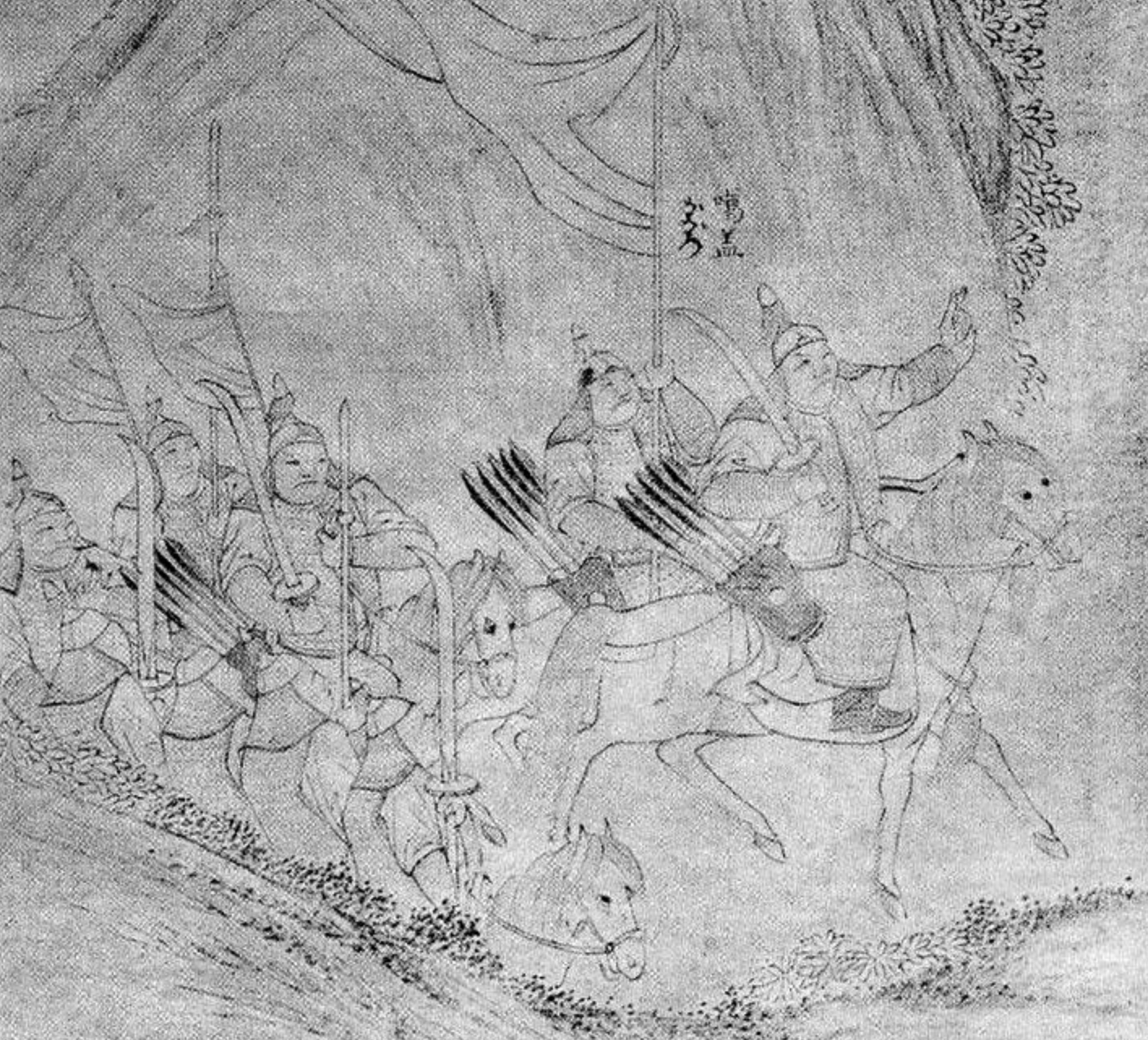
G'ag'ai leading troops in the Battle of Fodoho

G'ag'ai Jargūci (Manchu: ᡬᠠᡬᠠᡳ, romanized: G'ag'ai; d. 1600) was an early Jianzhou Jurchen statesman of the Irgen Gioro clan, who later belonged to the Manchu Bordered Red Banner. G'ag'ai was given the title “Judicial Minister” (Manchu: ᠵᠠᡵᡤᡡᠴᡳ, romanized: Jargūci) and is remembered as one of the creators of the initial edition of the Manchu script, known as "the Script Without Dots and Circles" (Tongki Fuka Akū Hergen, 无圈點滿文).

== Biography ==
G'ag'ai joined Nurhaci's tribal forces during the early stage of Nurhaci's rise to power among the Jianzhou Jurchens and was initially assigned to the Bordered Yellow Banner. He was granted the title of one of the "Judicial Minister", a rank second only to that of the "Five Grand Ministers" (五大臣), the tribal nation's most senior officials. He distinguished himself in campaigns against various Jurchen tribes. In 1599, Nurhaci ordered G'ag'ai and scholar Erdeni to create a writing system for the Jurchen language. Because the Jurchen tribes had long used written Mongolian for formal communication and administrative purposes, the two men initially found the task difficult. Following Nurhaci's inspiration of using Mongolian alphabet to spell out Jurchen language, they began working towards that direction which created the writing system later became known as the earliest form of the Manchu script, or the “Script Without Dots and Circles.”

In the autumn of the same year, G'ag'ai and Fiongdon led 2,000 troops to Hada (one of the four tribal nation among Haixi Jurchens) to assist its ruler, Menggebulu, in resisting attacks from the State of Yehe. However, Menggebulu was persuaded by promises of advantage from Yehe and instead attempted to seize G'ag'ai and his companions. Nurhaci responded by deploying troops to capture Menggebulu. Shortly afterward, Menggebulu became involved in an alleged plot to assassinate Nurhaci. Because G'ag'ai failed to report the conspiracy in a timely manner, he was executed together with Menggebulu.

After G'ag'ai was executed, his eldest son, Ušan, was granted a position of niru (company) commander in consideration of his father's achievements. During the reign of Hong Taiji, he became one of the Sixteen Ministers (十六大臣) and served as the Minister of Works. For his military merits, he was awarded the hereditary noble rank of adaha hafan. His third son, Bušan, served as Commander of the Imperial Guards and as a Minister during the reign of Hong Taiji. In recognition of his military service, he received the hereditary rank of baitalabure hafan.
