= Xibe language =

Tungusic language spoken in northwest China

Xibe
- Sibe
- ᠰᡞᠪᡝᡤᡞᠰᡠᠨ sibe gisun
- Pronunciation: [ɕivə kisun]
- Native to: China
- Region: Xinjiang
- Ethnicity: 189,000 Sibe people (2000)
- Native speakers: (30,000 cited 2000)
- Language family: Tungusic: Southern; Jurchenic; Manchu–Xibe; Xibe
- Writing system: Sibe alphabet (variant of the Manchu alphabet)

Language codes
- ISO 639-3: sjo
- Glottolog: xibe1242
- ELP: Xibe
- Linguasphere: 44-CAA-cbe
- Xibe is classified as Severely Endangered by the UNESCO Atlas of the World's Languages in Danger.

The Xibe language (endonym: ᠰᡞᠪᡝᡤᡞᠰᡠᠨ sibe gisun; also Sibo, Sibe) is a Tungusic language spoken by members of the Sibe minority of Xinjiang, in Northwest China. With over 30 thousand speakers, it is the most widely spoken Tungusic language, accounting for over half of all speakers of Tungusic languages.

== Classification ==
Sibe is conventionally viewed as a separate language within the southern group of Tungusic languages alongside the more well-known Manchu language, having undergone more than 200 years of development separated from the Tungusic-speaking heartland since Sibe troops were dispatched to the Xinjiang frontiers in 1764. Some researchers such as Jerry Norman hold that Sibe is a dialect of Manchu, whereas Xibologists such as An Jun argue that Sibe should be considered the "successor" to Manchu. Ethnohistorically, the Sibe people are not considered Manchu people, because they were excluded from chieftain Nurhaci's 17th-century tribal confederation to which the name "Manchu" was later applied.

== Phonology ==
Sibe is mutually intelligible with Manchu, although unlike Manchu, Sibe has reported to have eight vowel distinctions as opposed to the six found in Manchu, as well as differences in morphology, and a more complex system of vowel harmony.

=== Consonants ===
		Labial	Alveolar		Retroflex	(Alveolo-) palatal	Velar	Uvular
		Labial	plain	sibilant	Retroflex	(Alveolo-) palatal	Velar	Uvular
Nasal		m	n				ŋ	
Plosive/ Affricate	unaspirated	p	t	t͡s	ʈ͡ʂ	t͡ɕ	k	q
Plosive/ Affricate	aspirated	pʰ	tʰ	t͡sʰ	ʈ͡ʂʰ	t͡ɕʰ	kʰ	qʰ
Fricative	voiceless	f		s	ʂ	ɕ	x	χ
Fricative	voiced	v			ʐ			
Rhotic			r					
Approximant		w	l			j		

- Fricative sounds /x, χ/ are often voiced as [ɣ, ʁ], when occurring after a resonant sound.
- /s, ɕ/ often are voiced as [z, ʑ], when occurring in word-medial positions.
- /m/ can be heard as labio-dental [ɱ], when preceding a /v/.

=== Vowels ===
	Front		Central	Back
High	i	y		u
Mid			ə	o
Low-mid	ɛ	œ		
Low			a	

- Allophones of /œ/, /ə/, and /o/ are [ø], [ɤ], [ɔ].

== Morphology ==
Sibe has seven case morphemes, three of which are used quite differently from modern Manchu. The categorization of morphemes as case markers in spoken Sibe is partially controversial due to the status of numerous suffixes in the language. Despite the general controversy about the categorization of case markers versus postpositions in Tungusic languages, four case markers in Sibe are shared with literary Manchu (Nominative, Genitive, Dative-Locative and Accusative). Sibe's three innovated cases – the ablative, lative, and instrumental-sociative share their meanings with similar case forms in neighboring Uyghur, Kazakh, and Oiryat Mongolian.

Case Name	Suffix	Example	English gloss
Nominative	-∅	ɢazn-∅	village
Genitive	-i	ɢazn-i	of the village
Dative-Locative	-də/-t	ɢazn-t	to the village
Accusative	-f/-və	ɢazn-və	the village (object)
Ablative	-dəri	ɢazn-dəri	from the village
Lative	-ći	ɢazn-ći	towards the village
Instrumental-Sociative	-maq	ɢazn-maq	with the village

== Lexicon ==
The general vocabulary and structure of Sibe has not been affected as much by Chinese as Manchu has. However, Sibe has absorbed a large body of Chinese sociological terminology, especially in politics: like gəming ("revolution", from 革命) and zhuxi ("chairperson", from 主席), and economics: like chūna ("cashier", from 出纳) and daikuan ("loan", from 贷款). Written Sibe is more conservative and rejecting of loanwords, but spoken Sibe contains additional Chinese-derived vocabulary such as nan (from 男) for "man" where the Manchu-based equivalent is niyalma. There has also been some influence from Russian, including words such as konsul ("consul", from консул) and mashina ("sewing machine", from машина). Smaller Xinjiang languages contribute mostly cultural terminology, such as namas ("an Islamic feast") from Uygur and baige ("horse race") from Kazakh.

== Writing system ==
Sibe is written in a derivative of the Manchu alphabet. The Sibe alphabet diverges from the Manchu alphabet in that the positions of the letters in some words have changed, Sibe lacks 13 out of 131 syllables in Manchu, and Sibe has three syllables that are not found in Manchu (wi, wo, and wu).

The table below lists the letters in Sibe that differentiate it from Manchu as well as the placement of the letters. Blue areas mark letters with different shapes from Manchu, green areas marks different Unicode codes from Manchu.

Letters				Transliteration (Paul Georg von Mollendorf/Abkai/CMCD)	Unicode encoding	Description
Independent	Initial	Medial	Final	Transliteration (Paul Georg von Mollendorf/Abkai/CMCD)	Unicode encoding	Description
ᡞ	ᡞ᠊	᠊ᡞ᠊	᠊ᡞ	i	185E	The second row for the shape after a vowel; The third for the shape after b, p, and feminine k, g, h; The fourth row for the shape after dz/z
ᡞ	ᡞ᠊	᠊ᡞ᠋᠊	᠊ᡞ	i	185E	The second row for the shape after a vowel; The third for the shape after b, p, and feminine k, g, h; The fourth row for the shape after dz/z
ᡞ	ᡞ᠊	ᡞ᠌᠊	᠊ᡞ᠋	i	185E	The second row for the shape after a vowel; The third for the shape after b, p, and feminine k, g, h; The fourth row for the shape after dz/z
ᡞ	ᡞ᠊	ᡞ᠌᠊	᠊ᡞ᠌	i	185E	The second row for the shape after a vowel; The third for the shape after b, p, and feminine k, g, h; The fourth row for the shape after dz/z
		᠊ᡡ᠊	᠊ᡡ	ū/v/uu	1861	Appears only after masculine k, g, h
ᡢ		ᡢ᠊	᠊ᡢ	ng	1862	Only occurs at the end of syllables
ᡣ	ᡣ᠊	᠊ᡣ᠊		k	1863	The first row for the shape before a, o, ū; The third row for the shape before e, i, u; The second row for the shape at the end of syllables.
ᡣ		᠊ᡣ᠋᠊	᠊ᡣ	k	1863	The first row for the shape before a, o, ū; The third row for the shape before e, i, u; The second row for the shape at the end of syllables.
ᡣ	ᡣ	᠊ᡴ᠌᠊		k	1863	The first row for the shape before a, o, ū; The third row for the shape before e, i, u; The second row for the shape at the end of syllables.
ᡪ	ᡪ᠊	᠊ᡪ᠊		j/j/zh	186A	Only appears in the first syllable
ᠷ	ᠷ᠊	᠊ᠷ᠊	᠊ᠷ	r	1837	Native Sibe words never begin with r
ᡫ	ᡫ᠊	᠊ᡫ᠊		f	186B	"F" in Sibe has only one shape. No shape change like Manchu occurs.
ᠸ	ᠸ᠊	᠊ᠸ᠊		w	1838	Can appear before a, e, i, o, u
ᡲ	ᡲ᠊	᠊ᡲ᠊		j/j''/zh	1872	jy is used for Chinese loanwords (zhi as in Pinyin)

== Cyrillization proposal ==
There was a proposal in China by 1957 to adapt the Cyrillic alphabet to Sibe, but this was abandoned in favor of the original Sibe script.

Cyrillic	Transliteration to Sibe Latin	IPA equivalent	Manchu/Sibe Alphabet Equivalent
А а	A a	a	ᠠ
Б б	B b	b	ᠪ
В в	V v	v	ᠸ
Г г	G g	g	ᡶ
Ғ ғ	Ḡ ḡ	ɢ	ᡬ
Д д	D d	d	ᡩ
Е е	E e	ə	ᡝ
Ё ё	Ö ö	œ	ᠣ
Ж ж	Z z	d͡z	ᡯ
Җ җ	J j	ɖ͡ʐ, d͡ʑ	ᠵ
З з	Ȥ ȥ	ʐ	ᡰ᠊
И и	I i	i	ᡳ
Й й	Y y	j	ᠶ
К к	K k	k	ᡴ
Қ қ	Ⱪ ⱪ	q	ᠺ
Л л	L l	l	ᠯ
М м	M m	m	ᠮ
Н н	N n	n	ᠨ
Ң ң	ŋ or ng	ŋ	ᠩ
О о	O o	ɔ	ᠣ
Ө ө	Ū ū	ø	ᡡ
П п	P p	p	ᡦ
Р р	R r	r	ᡵ
С с	S s	s	ᠰ
Т т	T t	t	ᡨ
У у	U u	u	ᡠ
Ү ү	W w	w	ᠸ
Ф ф	F f	f	‍ᡶ‍
Х х	H h	x	ᡥ᠊
Ҳ ҳ	Ⱨ ⱨ	χ	ᡥ᠊
Ц ц	Č č	t͡s	ᡱ᠊
Ч ч	C̄ c̄	ʈ͡ʂ	ᡷ᠊
Ш ш	S̨ s̨	ʂ	ᡧ
ы	E e	e	ᡝ
Ә ә	?	ɛ	ᠶᡝ
І і	Yi yi	ji	ᠶᡳ
Ю ю	Yu Yu	ju	ᠶᡠ
Я я	Ya ya	ja	ᠶᠠ
ь	–	sign of thinness	

== Usage ==
"Cabcal Serkin" in Sibe script (the name of Qapqal News, the world's only Sibe-language newspaper)

In 1998, there were eight primary schools that taught Sibe in the Qapqal Xibe Autonomous County where the medium of instruction was Chinese, but Sibe lessons were mandatory. From 1954 to 1959, the People's Publishing House in Ürümqi published over 285 significant works, including government documents, belles-lettres, and schoolbooks, in Sibe. Since 1946, the Sibe-language Qapqal News has been published in Yining. In Qapqal, Sibe-language programming is allocated 15 minutes per day of radio broadcasting and 15- to 30-minute television programmes broadcast once or twice per month.

Sibe is taught as a second language at the Ili Normal University in the Ili Kazakh Autonomous Prefecture of northern Xinjiang; it established an undergraduate major in the language in 2005. A few Manchu language enthusiasts from Eastern China have visited Qapqal Sibe County in order to experience an environment where a variety closely related to Manchu is spoken natively.
