= Sibe people =

Tungusic ethnic group of Northeast China and Xinjiang

Sibe
ᠰᡞᠪᡝ Sibo, Xibe, Xibo
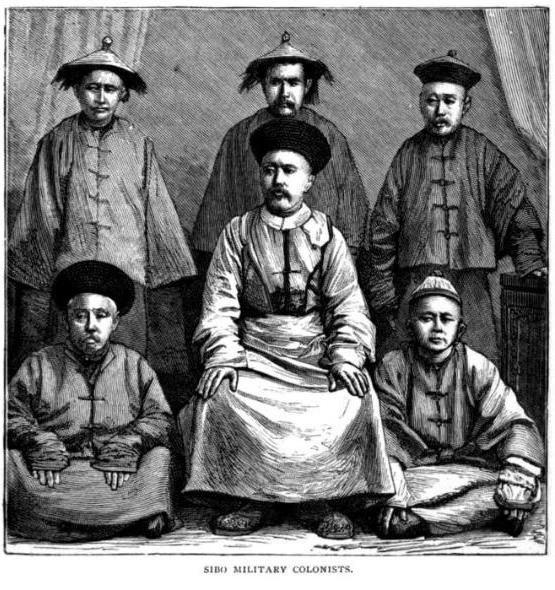
- "Sibo military colonists" – picture drawn by Henry Lansdell during his 1882 visit to what is now Qapqal Xibe Autonomous County

Total population
- 191,911 (2020 census)

Regions with significant populations
- China (Liaoning · Xinjiang · Heilongjiang · Jilin · Inner Mongolia)

Languages
- Mandarin Chinese and Sibe

Religion
- Tibetan Buddhism and shamanism

Related ethnic groups
- Manchus, Jaegaseung, Daur, Nanai, Orok, Evenks and Solon

The Sibe (Note: Also spelled Sibo, Xibe or Xibo.) (Note: Sibe: ᠰᡞᠪᡝ,, [ɕivə]; simplified Chinese: 锡伯; traditional Chinese: 錫伯; pinyin: Xībó) are a Tungusic-speaking East Asian ethnic group living mostly in Xinjiang, Jilin and Shenyang in Liaoning. The Sibe form one of the 56 ethnic groups officially recognized by China, and had a recorded population of 191,911 in the 2020 Chinese Census, comprising just over 0.014% of China's total population.

== Nomenclature ==
The Sibe are known by several variations of their name. The self-appellation of the Sibe people is pronounced Śivə, the official Chinese term is Xibo, in Russian literature the terms Сибинцы (sibintsy) and Шибинцы (shibintsy) are used, while in English works the name Sibe has been established, which corresponds to the written form.

== History ==
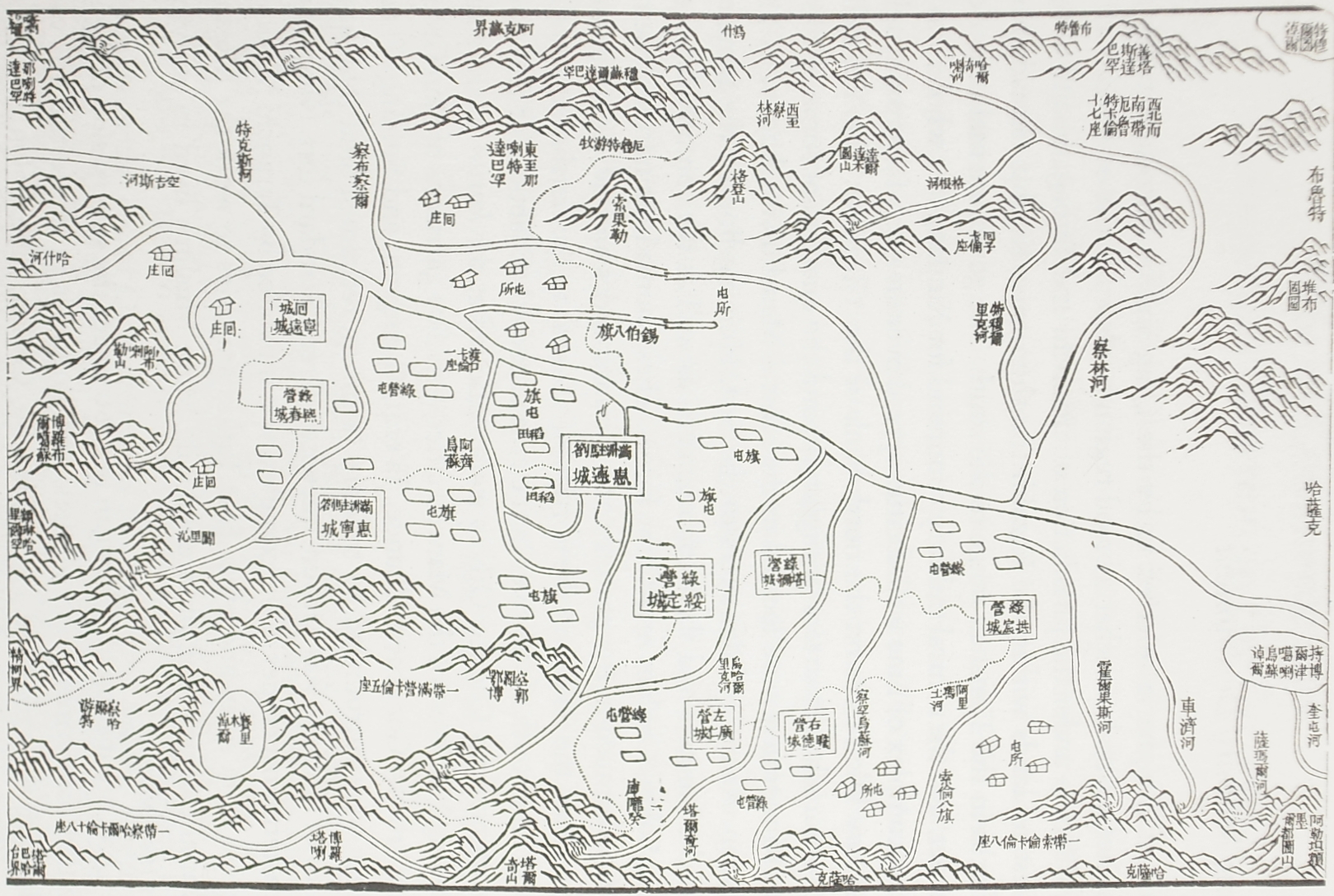
A c. 1809 map of the Ili Region with south on top showing the Sibe Eight Banners (锡伯八旗) stationed across the Ili River from the Manchu Fort Huiyuan (惠远城), exactly where Qapqal Xibe Autonomous County is nowadays

According to the Russian scholar Elena P. Lebedeva, the Sibe people originated as a southern, Tungusic-speaking offshoot of the ancient Shiwei people. They lived in small town-like settlements, a portion of them nomadic, in the Songyuan and Qiqihar areas of what is now Jilin.

When the Buyeo kingdom was conquered by the Xianbei in 286 AD, the southern Shiwei started practicing agriculture. Some historians have theorized that the Xianbei were the direct progenitors of the Sibe, a theory described by some as politically motivated. Pamela Kyle Crossley writes the Xianbei might have undergone a language shift from an earlier Turkic or proto-Mongolian language to a Tungusic one. However, the name "Sibe" was not used in historical records during Xianbei times.

The Han dynasty, Cao Wei and the Jin dynasty (266–420) at times controlled the Sibe until the advent of the Göktürks, who accorded the Sibe lower status than did the Chinese dynasties. At the height of their territorial dispersion, the Sibe lived in an area bounded by Jilin to the east, Hulunbuir to the west, the Nen River to the north and the Liao River to the south. After the fall of the Liao dynasty, the Sibe became vassals of the Khorchin Mongols who moved to the Nen and Songhua river valleys in 1438 after the Khorchin were defeated by the Oirats.

Nurhaci, the first prominent figure of the Manchu people, routed the Sibe during the battle of Gure in 1593 on his way to founding the Qing dynasty of China. From that point, the Qing contracted the Sibe for logistical support against the Russian Empire's expansionism on China's northern border. Crossley claims that the Sibe were so "well known to Russians moving toward the Pacific" that the Russians named Siberia after them. In 1692, the Khorchin dedicated the Sibe, the Gūwalca and the Daur to the Kangxi Emperor in exchange for silver. The Sibe were incorporated into the Eight Banners and were stationed in Qiqihar and other cities in Northeast China.

In 1700, some 20,000 Qiqihar Sibes were resettled in Hohhot (modern Inner Mongolia); 36,000 Songyuan Sibes were resettled in Shenyang, Liaoning. The relocation of the Sibe from Qiqihar is believed by Gorelova to be linked to the Qing's complete annihilation of the Manchu clan Hoifan (Hoifa) in 1697 and the Manchu tribe Ula in 1703 after they revolted against the Qing. According to Jerry Norman, after a revolt by the Qiqihar Sibes in 1764, the Qianlong Emperor ordered an 800-man military escort to transfer 18,000 Sibe to the Ili River of Dzungaria.

In Ili, the Xinjiang Sibe built Buddhist monasteries and cultivated vegetables, tobacco and poppies. The Sibe population declined after the Qing used them to suppress the Dungan Revolt (1862–77) by the Hui and to fight against the Russian occupation of Ili during the revolt. The scarcity of provisions in Ili became such that the Governor at last saw himself obliged to dismiss his last auxiliaries, the Thagor Kalmuks. In the meantime both Solons and Sibos were being attacked and plundered and were obliged to make peace with the insurgents, so that only Ili, Khorgos, Losigun and Suidun, remained in the hands of the Mantchus. Ili was now entirely surrounded and it was resolved to reduce it by famine. The situation there was indeed frightful; all the provisions had been exhausted and the only food was horses, dogs and cats. Typhus so raged that from 50 to 100 men died daily.

During the Republic of China (1912–49) period, many northeastern Sibe joined anti-Japanese volunteer armies, while northwestern Sibe fought against the Kuomintang during the Ili Rebellion. After the Chinese Communist Revolution in 1949 established the People's Republic of China (PRC), large-scale educational and hygiene campaigns increased Sibe literacy and resulted in the eradication of Qapqal disease (a form of type A botulism).

In 1954, the PRC established the Qapqal Xibe Autonomous County to replace Ningxi County in Xinjiang, in the group's area of highest ethnic concentration.

== Culture ==
Most historical analyses indicate that the Sibe people were never treated as part of the Manchu proper, nor do they ever perceive themselves as being the same as the Manchu people. The Sibe garrisons were administered separately from those of the Manchu and did not enjoy the same rights as them. The Sibe soldiers had to earn their living by squatting on land to become self-sufficient, while the Manchu garrisons were supplied by the Qing state. Possibly due to the unequal administrative treatment in the history, alongside their late incorporation into the Eight Banners, there is both a Sibe self-perception and state recognition of the Sibe people in more recent times as a national minority that is distinct from the Manchu.

Historical religions of the Sibe included shamanism and Buddhism. Customary Sibe attire included short buttoned jackets and trousers for men and close-fitting, long and lace-trimmed gowns for women. Arranged marriage was common and women had low social status, including no right to inherit property. Nowadays almost all the Sibe wear modern clothing and the traditional clothing is worn by elders during festivals. Traditionally, the Sibe were divided into many hala, male-led clans consisting of people who shared the same surname. Until modern times, the dwellings of the Sibe housed up to three different generations from the same family, since it was believed that while the father was alive no son could break the family clan by leaving the house.

The Sibe in Northeast China speak Mandarin Chinese as their first language. In some Sibe communities in Northeast China, women are not allowed to live with men before formal marriage. During this time, the man must formally propose and express his intention to marry through specific acts and ceremonies. Only after the woman accepts the proposal and the marriage is finalized can she move into the man's home. In Xinjiang, descendants of the Qing dynasty military garrison speak the Xibe language, a Southern Tungusic language that underwent morphophonological changes and the adoption of loanwords from languages spoken in Xinjiang including Mandarin Chinese, Russian, Uyghur, and Kazakh.

The different ethnicities of Northern Xinjiang have shared musical culture and adopted elements from each other's music.

== Distribution ==
According to the 2010 Chinese Census, there were 190,481 Sibe people in China: 99,571 males and 90,910 females. The largest Sibe population within China was in the province of Liaoning, home to 132,431 Sibe people, 69.52% of all Sibe people in China, but just 0.30% of Liaoning's total population. The autonomous region of Xinjiang is also home to a sizable number of Sibe people: 34,399 in total, accounting for 18.06% of all Sibe people in China, and 0.16% of Xinjiang's total population. Outside of these two, Heilongjiang, Jilin, and Inner Mongolia have the largest Sibe populations, totaling 7,608, 3,113, and 3,000, respectively.

Distribution of Sibe people in China
Provincial-level division	2010	
Provincial-level division	Population	Percent of total Sibe in China
Liaoning	132,431	69.52%
Xinjiang	34,399	18.06%
Heilongjiang	7,608	3.99%
Jilin	3,113	1.63%
Inner Mongolia	3,000	1.57%
Beijing	2,569	1.35%
Hebei	851	0.45%
Guangdong	705	0.37%
Shanghai	696	0.37%
Shandong	661	0.35%
Tianjin	536	0.28%
Jiangsu	433	0.23%
Shaanxi	416	0.22%
Sichuan	381	0.20%
Gansu	299	0.16%
Henan	273	0.14%
Hubei	228	0.12%
Zhejiang	200	0.10%
Guizhou	185	0.10%
Ningxia	184	0.10%
Shanxi	158	0.08%
Yunnan	158	0.08%
Guangxi	146	0.08%
Anhui	143	0.08%
Chongqing	143	0.08%
Fujian	142	0.08%
Hunan	136	0.07%
Qinghai	128	0.07%
Jiangxi	81	0.04%
Hainan	72	0.04%
Tibet	6	< 0.01%
Total	190,481	100.00%

=== Xinjiang ===
Approximately 43,000 Sibe people live in the autonomous region of Xinjiang, of which, approximately 34,000 live in the Ili Kazakh Autonomous Prefecture, where the Qapqal Xibe Autonomous County is located. As of 2018, 19,984 Sibe people live in the autonomous county, comprising 10.28% of its total population, which is dominated by larger groups, such as the Han Chinese, Uyghurs, and Kazakhs. In 2015, 20,426 Sibe people lived in the autonomous county, comprising 10.38% of its total population.

Distribution of Sibe people in Xinjiang
Prefecture-level division	2015		2018	
Prefecture-level division	Population	Percent of total Sibe in Xinjiang	Population	Percent of total Sibe in Xinjiang
Ili Kazakh Autonomous Prefecture	34,457	80.18%	33,879	79.21%
Ürümqi	5,686	13.23%	5,767	13.48%
Karamay	986	2.29%	1,033	2.42%
Changji Hui Autonomous Prefecture	651	1.51%	666	1.56%
Bortala Mongol Autonomous Prefecture	196	0.46%	425	0.99%
Bayingolin Mongol Autonomous Prefecture	265	0.62%	226	0.53%
Xinjiang Production and Construction Corps	305	0.71%	202	0.47%
Aksu	126	0.29%	177	0.41%
Hami	158	0.37%	155	0.36%
Kashgar	100	0.23%	133	0.31%
Hotan	12	0.03%	55	0.13%
Kizilsu Kyrgyz Autonomous Prefecture	6	0.01%	33	0.08%
Turpan	26	0.06%	21	0.05%
Xinjiang Total	42,974	100.00%	42,772	100.00%

== Notable individuals ==
- Tong Liya (佟丽娅), actress
- Wu Qian (吴谦), retired basketball player
