= Family of origin =

Person's early social group

Family of origin refers to the early social group a person belongs to in childhood, which is often a person's biological family or an adoptive family. The family of origin is often referred to in contrast to the family of choice independently in adulthood (such as marriage, living independently, etc).

== Psychology ==
As psychological counseling and psychotherapy have gradually become more prevalent, mental health, personal development, and self-actualization have received more attention. The concept of the family of origin provides a new perspective for understanding and dealing with intergenerational relationships and treating the psychological trauma brought about by intimate relationships. Throughout the long process of growing up, people develop fixed thinking habits and attachment patterns. The process of growing up is also a process of recognizing, perceiving, and reflecting on one's family of origin.

== Sociology ==
With the rapid urbanization and rising education levels in third world, there are significant differences between generations in terms of education, values, lifestyles, etc. The increasing emphasis on the concept of the family of origin reflects the generation gap caused by rapid economic growth.

== For women ==
In the social customs of some regions such as ancient China, the husband's family was the family a woman belonged to after marriage, while the family of origin became the "outer kins" to which she could not return or only occasionally visit.

== See also ==
- Family of choice
