= Patriarchal clan system =

Ancient Chinese political system

In ancient China, the patriarchal clan system (Chinese: 宗法; pinyin: zōngfǎ; lit. 'clan law') of the Zhou cultural sphere was a primary means of group relations and power stratification prior to the Western Zhou and through the first half of the Eastern Zhou dynasty. This method of social organisation underlay and prefigured the political workings of the Zhou state. The patriarchal system was based on blood relations, with firstborn succession at its core, and played a role in maintaining the Western Zhou political hierarchy and stabilizing social order. Together with the ritual and music system it is seen as having been the foundation of Zhou society.

== Overview ==
The Zhou people had the custom of building ancestral temples early on, and the clan temple housed a Spirit tablet representing the ancestor, and the number of shrines built inside depended on the hierarchical status of the patriarch. In addition to rituals, the temples were also used for major ceremonies and decisions, and had the character of a ceremonial hall. This respect for the ancestors strengthened the unity within the clan and stabilized the social structure. Complementing the clan temple system was the clan tomb system, in which nobles and state officials were buried en masse in public cemeteries during the Western Zhou and Spring and Autumn period. According to the three books of rites, all clansmen should be buried in the clan tomb, except for the murderous dead. The patriarch sometimes had to go to the clan tomb to report the ancestors when there was an urgent matter.

The modern standard Chinese word for "surname" is 姓氏; xíngshì. In the Western Zhou dynasty, xing (姓) and shi (氏) were two separate surnames, with the larger xing indicating shared aristocratic descent and shi being a branch lineage of xing based on geographic locale. The nobles were granted a given name by their fathers when they were young, and courtesy name when they were adults. The courtesy name is taken at the Capping Ceremony or Maturity Ceremony; sometimes at marriage for women. For men, there are three characters in the full courtesy name of the individual aristocrat. The first character indicates the birth order that generation from eldest to youngest: 伯、仲、叔、季, occasionally 孟. The second character is arbitrary, and may echo names from previous generations or be consistent across all sons of the same father. The last character is a word for "father". This is similar to cadency in Western heraldry.

Similar to the clan society, the nobles of the Zhou dynasty forbade same-surname marriage.

== See also ==
- Veneration of the dead
- Fengjian
- Ritual and music system
- Cadency
- Ancestor veneration in China
- Inner kins (Chinese)
- outer kins
