= Inner kins (Chinese) =

Kinship clan in Chinese culture

- Traditional Chinese: 1. 堂親; 2. 内親; 3. 宗亲; 4. 族亲; 5. 同宗
- Simplified Chinese: 1. 堂亲; 2. 内亲; 3. 宗亲; 4. 族亲; 5. 同宗
- Literal meaning: 1. hall kin; 2. inner kin; 3. lineage kin; 4. clan/ethnicity kin; 5. same lineage
Transcriptions
Standard Mandarin
- Hanyu Pinyin: 1. tángqīn; 2. nèiqīn; 3. zōngqīn; 4. zúqīn; 5. tóngzōng
- Bopomofo: 1. ㄊㄤˊ ㄑㄧㄣ; 2. ㄋㄟˋ ㄑㄧㄣ; 3. ㄗㄨㄥ ㄑㄧㄣ; 4. ㄗㄨˊ ㄑㄧㄣ
- Wade–Giles: 1. t'ang^{2}-ch'in^{1}; 2. nei^{4}-ch'in^{1}; 3. tsung^{1}-ch'in^{1}
- Tongyong Pinyin: 1. táng-chīn; 2. nèi-chīn; 3. zōng-chīn; 4. zú-chīn; 5. tóng-zōng
- IPA: 1. [tʰǎŋ.tɕʰín]; 2. [nêɪ.tɕʰín]; 3. [tsʊ́ŋ.tɕʰín]
other Mandarin
- Sichuanese Pinyin: 3. zong^{1} qin^{1}
Wu
- Romanization: 1. don qin
Gan
- Romanization: 1. dong chin
Yue: Cantonese
- Yale Romanization: 1. tòhng chān; 2. noih chān; 3. jūng chān
- Jyutping: 1. tong4 can1; 2. noi6 can1; 3. zung1 can1
- IPA: [tʰɔŋ˩.tsʰɐn˥]
Southern Min
- Hokkien POJ: 1. tông-chhin; 2. lāi-chhin

Inner kins (simplified Chinese: 宗亲; traditional Chinese: 宗親; pinyin: zōngqīn) is the kinship clan in Chinese patriarchy. This term usually referred to the paternal family. Since the Zhou Dynasty, traditional Chinese society has been structured around networks of male kin who controlled rituals and the traditions of warfare, while maternal cousins had no right to intervene.

Besides women who were married into the clan, inner kin share the same surname. They are not allowed to marry each other.

== Members ==
- Father and mother (父母; fùmǔ) ― the mother is "transplanted" (嫁; jià) to father by her family of origin (原生家庭; yuánshēng jiātíng).
- Paternal grandfather (祖父、爷爷; zǔfù, yéye) and paternal grandmother (祖母、奶奶; zǔmǔ, nǎinai).
- Paternal uncles (叔、伯; shū, bó) and aunts (姑; gū).
- Paternal cousins (堂兄弟姐妹; táng xiōngdì jiěmèi).
- Sons (儿子; érzi), their wives (daughters-in-law) (儿媳; érxí).

== See also ==
- Outer kins
- Chinese kin
- Patriarchal clan system
