= Ancestor veneration in China =

Traditional veneration of ancestors in Chinese culture

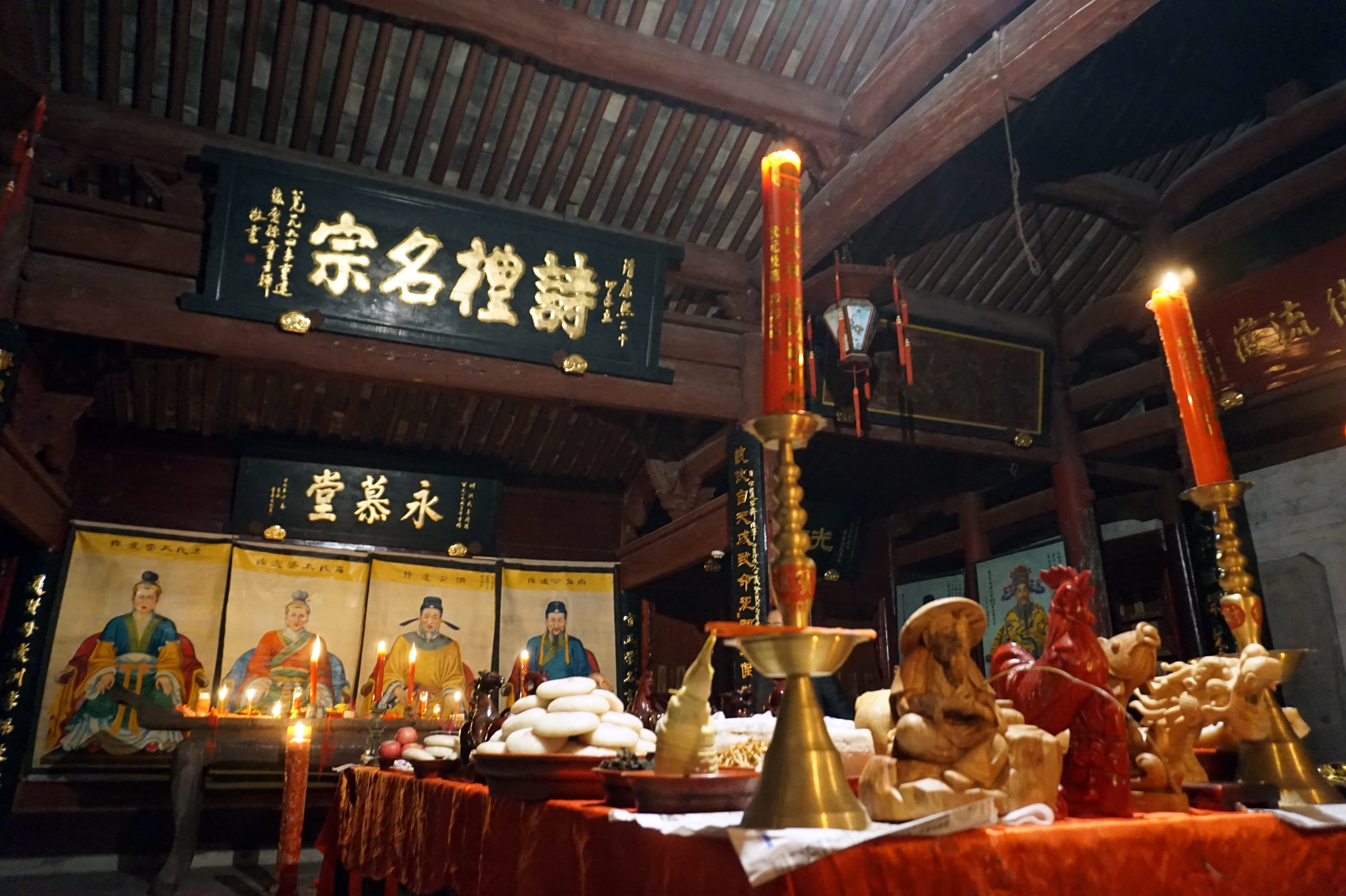
Tong kin's ancestral sacrifice, in Qiantong, Zhejiang

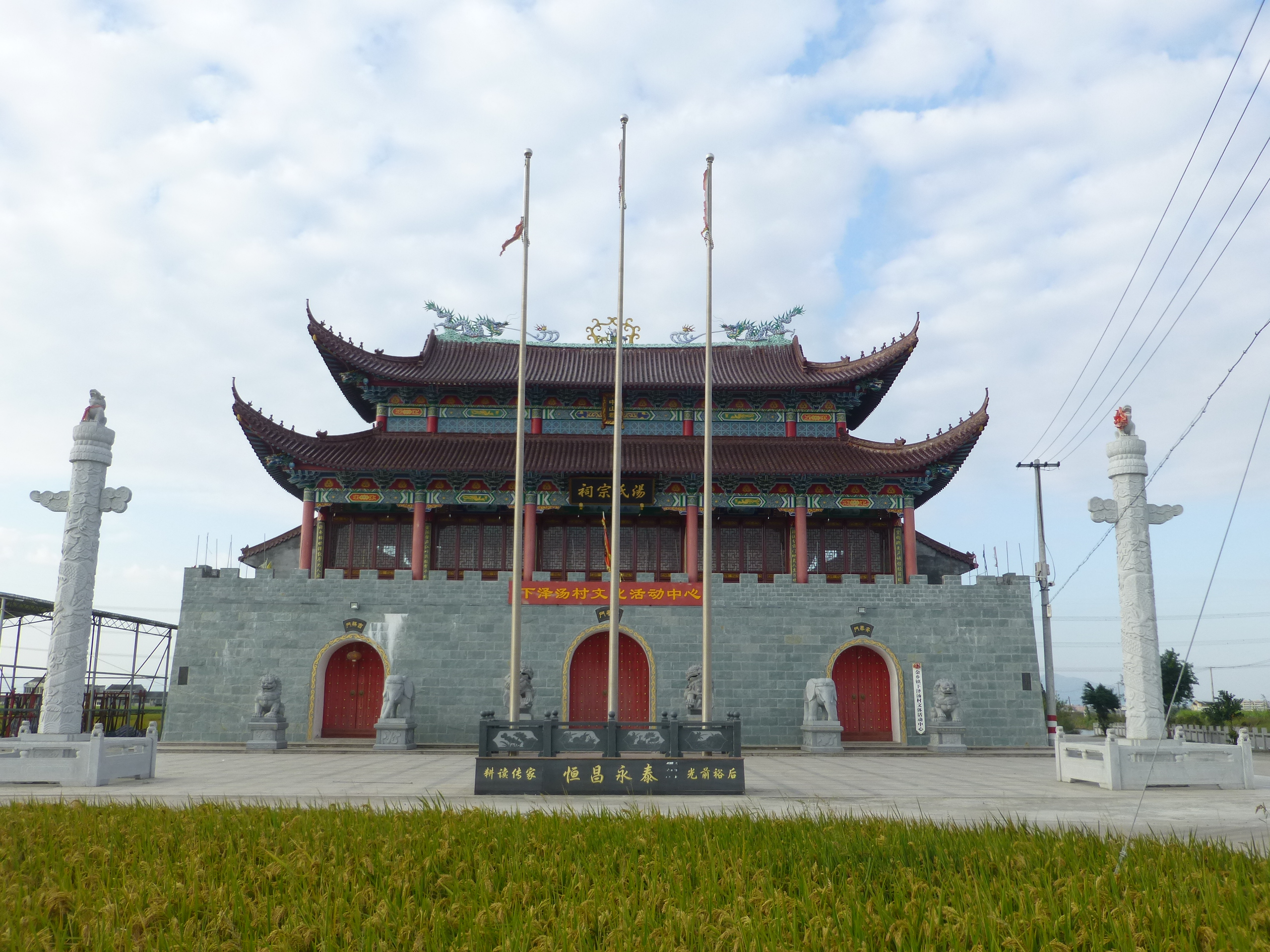
Tāng kin's temple and cultural centre of Jinxiang village, Cangnan, Zhejiang

Chinese ancestor veneration, also called Chinese ancestor worship, (Note: known by various names including Chinese: 祖先崇拜; pinyin: Zǔxiān chóngbài, Chinese: 祭祀祖先; pinyin: Jìsì zǔxiān, Chinese: 祭拜祖先 (祭祖); pinyin: Jì bài zǔxiān (jì zǔ) and Chinese: 拜太公; pinyin: Bài tàigōng) is an aspect of the Chinese traditional religion which revolves around the ritual celebration of the deified ancestors and tutelary deities of people with the same surname organised into lineage societies in ancestral shrines. Ancestors, their ghosts, or spirits, and gods are considered part of "this world". They are neither supernatural (in the sense of being outside nature) nor transcendent in the sense of being beyond nature. The ancestors are humans who have become godly beings, beings who keep their individual identities. For this reason, Chinese religion is founded on veneration of ancestors. Ancestors are believed to be a means of connection to the supreme power of Tian as they are considered embodiments or reproducers of the creative order of Heaven. It is a major aspect of Han Chinese religion, but the custom has also spread to ethnic minority groups.

Ancestor veneration is largely focused on male ancestors. Hence, it is also called Chinese patriarchal religion. It was believed that women did not pass down surnames because they were incapable of carrying down a bloodline. Chinese kinship traces ancestry through the male lineage that is recorded in genealogy books. They consider their ancestral home to be where their patriline ancestor was born (usually about five generations back) or the origin of their surname.

Confucian philosophy calls for paying respect to one's ancestors, an aspect of filial piety; Zhuo Xinping (2011) views traditional patriarchal religion as the religious organisation complementing the ideology of Confucianism. As the "bedrock faith of the Chinese", traditional patriarchal religion influences the religious psychology of all Chinese and has influenced the other religions of China, as it is evident in the worship of founders of temples and schools of thought in Taoism and Chinese Buddhism.

Ancestor veneration practices prevail in South China, where lineage bonds are stronger, the patrilineal hierarchy is not based upon seniority, and access to corporate resources held by a lineage is based upon the equality of all the lines of descent; whereas in North China worship of communal deities is prevalent.

== Definition ==
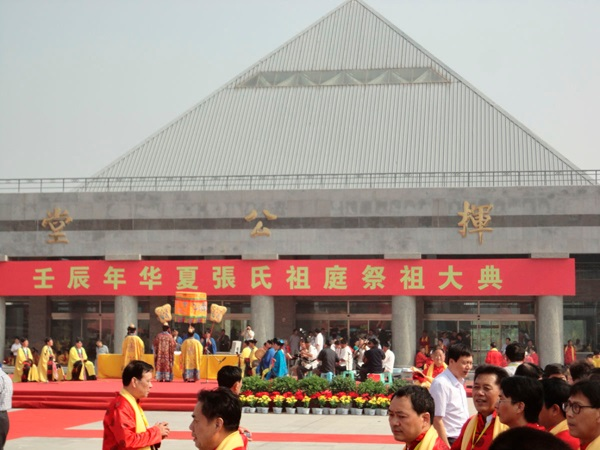
An ancestral worship ceremony led by Taoist priests at the pyramidal-shaped Great Temple of Zhang Hui (张挥公大殿; Zhāng Huī gōng dàdiàn), the central ancestral shrine dedicated to the progenitor of the Zhang lineage, located at Zhangs' ancestral home in Qinghe, Hebei.

Some contemporary scholars in China have adopted the names "Chinese traditional patriarchal religion" (中國傳統宗法性宗教; Zhōngguó chuántǒng zōngfǎ xìng zōngjiào) or "Chinese traditional primordial religion" (中國傳統原生性宗教; Zhōngguó chuántǒng yuánshēng xìng zōngjiào) to define the traditional religious system organised around the worship of ancestor-gods.

Mou Zhongjian defines "clan-based traditional patriarchal religion" as "an orthodox religion that was widely accepted by all classes, and had been practiced for thousands of years in ancient China". Mou also says that this religion was subordinate to the state, it was "diverse and inclusive" and had "a humanistic spirit that emphasises the social, moral function of religion", and is closely related to politics. It refers to:

«[...] The traditional religion that had been in place since the Xia, Shang, and Zhou dynasties. It evolved from the worship of Heaven and ancestors. It had the basic components of a religion, including religious concepts, emotions, and rituals. It had no independent organisation. Instead, it was the kinship structure that fulfilled the functions of religious organisation. The emperor, who was the son of God, was the representative of the people who worshiped Heaven. Elders of the clans and parents represented the family in the worship of ancestors. Respecting Heaven and honoring ancestors (jingtian fazu), taking good care in seeing off the deceased, and maintaining sacrifices to distant ancestors (shenzhong zhuiyuan) were the basic religious concepts and emotional expressions in this religion. [...]»

According to Zhuo Xinping (2011), Chinese patriarchal religion and Confucianism complemented each other in ancient China, as the Confucian religion traditionally lacked a social religious organisation while traditional patriarchal religion lacked an ideological doctrine.

== History ==
The Song Dynasty was an important period in the development of ancestor veneration, as neo-Confucian intellectuals advocated patrilineal descent-line ethics grounded in concepts of filial piety and kinship.

Before the founding of the People's Republic of China in 1949, lineage organizations were the most powerful social body in local society, and these reinforced practices of ancestor veneration.

== Practices ==
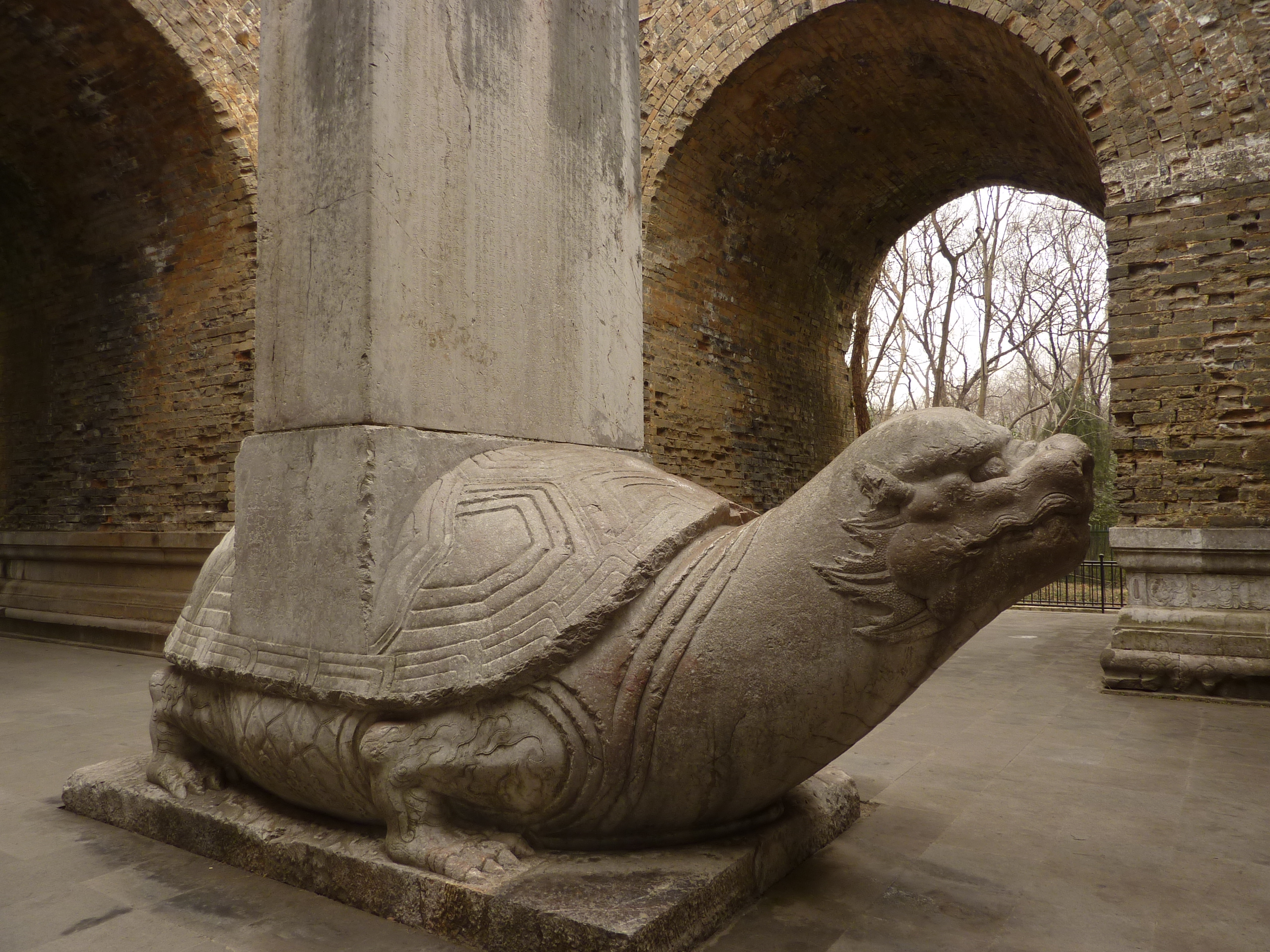
A stone tortoise with the "Stele of Divine Merits and Saintly Virtues" (Shengong Shende), erected by the Yongle Emperor in 1413 in honor of his father, the Hongwu Emperor in the Ming Xiaoling Mausoleum ("Ming Mausoleum of Filial Piety").

=== Chinese folk religion ===
Ancestor veneration is a major component of Chinese folk religion.

In Chinese folk religion, a person is often thought to have multiple souls, categorized as hun and po, commonly associated with yang and yin, respectively. Upon death, hun and po separate. Generally, the former ascends into heaven and the latter descends into the earth and/or resides within a spirit tablet; however, beliefs concerning the number and nature of souls vary. In accordance with these traditional beliefs, various practices have arisen to address the perceived needs of the deceased.

The basic ritual required in ancestor veneration is proper mourning and burial for parents, and regular offerings so that the deceased will be provided for in death.

==== Mourning ====
The mourning of a loved one usually involves elaborate rituals, which vary according to region and sect. The intensity of the mourning is thought to reflect the quality of relationship one had with the deceased. From the time of Confucius until the 20th century, a three-year mourning period was often prescribed, mirroring the first three years in a child's life when they are utterly dependent upon and loved unconditionally by their parents. These mourning practices would often include wearing sackcloth or simple garb, leaving hair unkempt, eating a restricted diet of congee two times a day, living in a mourning shack placed beside the house, and moaning in pain at certain intervals of the day. It is said, that after the death of Confucius his followers engaged in this three-year mourning period to symbolize their commitment to his teachings.

==== Funeral rites ====
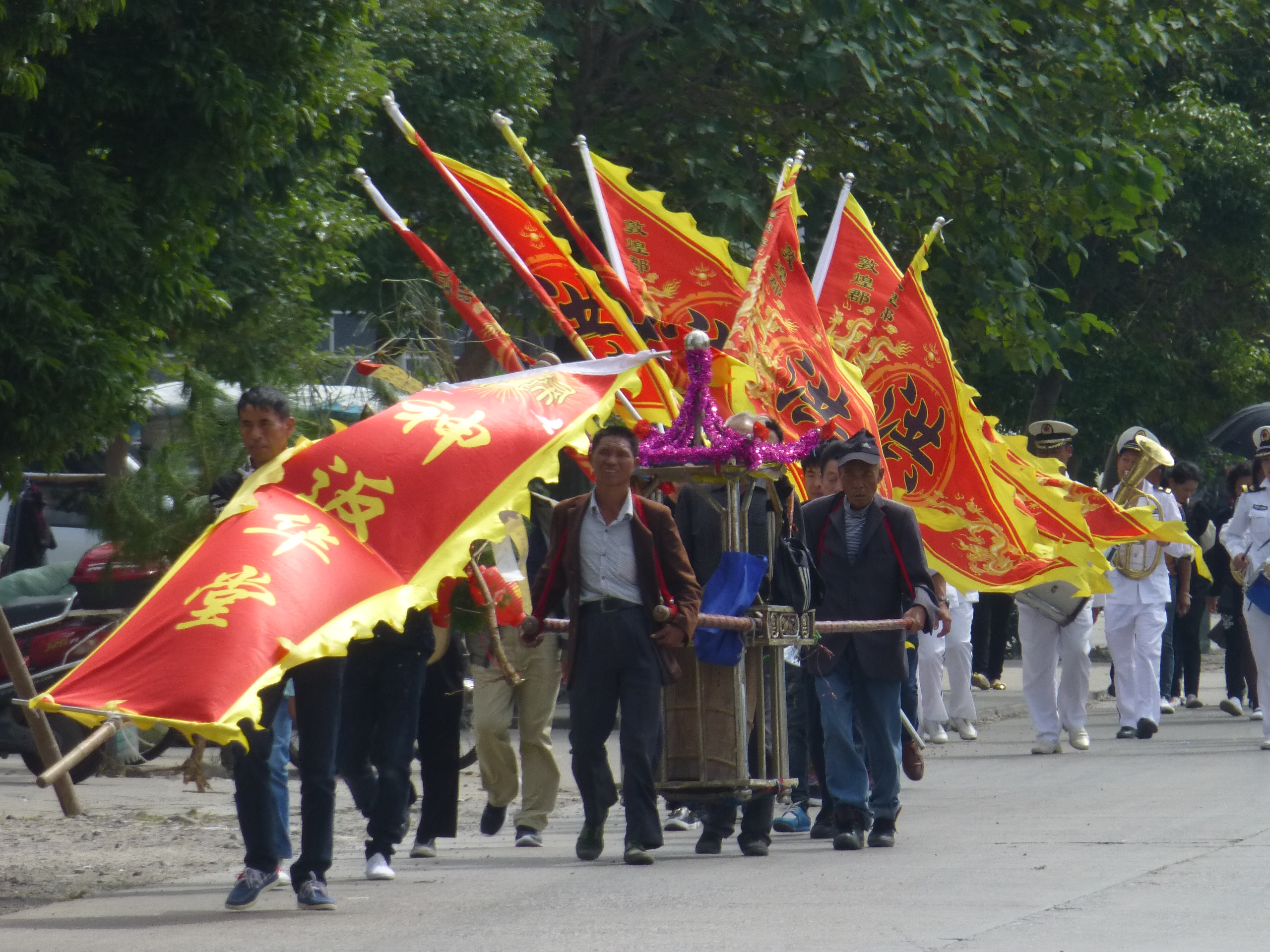
A funeral procession in Zhejiang province

Funerals are considered to be a part of the normal process of family life, serving as a cornerstone in inter-generational traditions. The primary goals, regardless of religious beliefs, are to demonstrate obeisance and provide comfort for the deceased. Other goals include: to protect the descendants of the deceased from malevolent spirits and to ensure the proper separation and direction of the deceased's soul into the afterlife.

Some common elements of Chinese funerals include the expression of grief through prolonged, often exaggerated, wailing; the wearing of white mortuary clothes by the family of the deceased; a ritual washing of the corpse, followed by its attiring in grave clothes; the transfer of symbolic goods such as money and food from the living to the dead; the preparation and installation of a spirit tablet or the use of a personator, often symbolic. Sometimes, ritual specialists such as Taoist priests or Buddhist monks would be hired to perform specific rites, often accompanied by the playing of music or chanting of scripture to drive away evil spirits.

==== Burial ====
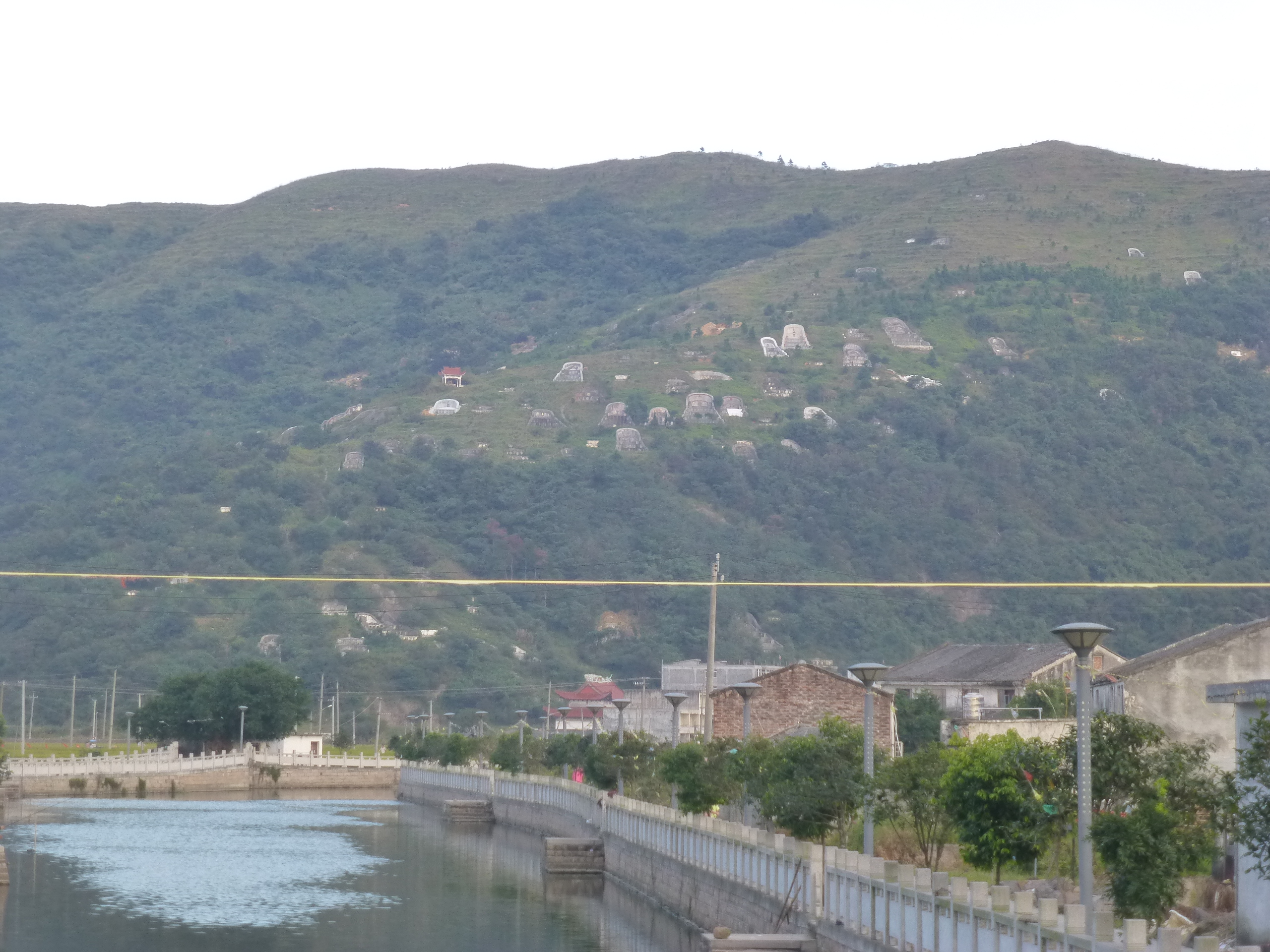
A typical traditional hill slope cemetery of China's southeastern coast

Burial is often delayed according to wealth; the coffin would remain in the main room of the family home until it has been properly prepared for burial. More traditionally, this delay is pre-determined according to social status: the corpse of a king or emperor would be held in abeyance for seven months; magnates, five; other officers, three; commoners, one.

In some instances, a "lucky burial" can take place several years after the burial. The bones are dug up, washed, dried, and stored in an earthenware jar. After a period of storage, the contents are then interred in their final resting place in a location selected by an augur to optimize the flow of qi. A bad qi flow could result in a disgruntled spirit who could possibly haunt their descendants.

The deceased would often be buried with sacrifices, typically things one was thought to be in need of in the afterlife. This was done as a symbolic demonstration of filial piety or grandeur. For the wealthy and powerful, bronze vessels, oracle bones, and human or animal sacrifices often accompanied the deceased into the grave. More common sacrifices included candles and incense, as well as offerings of wine and food.

==== Continued obeisance ====
After the funeral, families often install an ancestral tablet at a household altar alongside other deceased ancestors. This act symbolically unifies the ancestors and honors the family lineage. Incense is lit before the altar daily, significant announcements are made before them, and offerings such as favorite foods, beverages, and spirit money are given bi-monthly and on special occasions, such as during the Qingming Festival and Zhong Yuan Festival.

Prayer was usually performed at the household altar in a separate room containing the po of their ancestors. The eldest male would speak to the altar on a regular basis. In some belief systems where special powers are ascribed to the deceased, he may supplicate the spirit to bless the family.

==== Modern times ====
When a family member dies in modern China and Taiwan, they are given various kinds of rewards such as "a toothbrush, money, food, water", "a credit card and[/or] a computer."

=== Taoism ===
Some Taoists practiced ancestor veneration and beseeched ancestors, multiple ancestors, and pantheons of ancestors to aid them in life and/or abolish their sins.

=== Confucianism ===
Some Confucianists practice ancestor worship as a form of filial piety.

=== Martial arts ===
China is the origin country of several thousand martial arts styles, some traditional and others modern. In the Traditional Chinese Martial Arts, practices of ancestor worship are prevalent and common. Typically, a traditional school, called a 'Wuguan' ('Martial Hall'), will often feature an ancestral altar. On the altar there are typically pictures or paintings of lineage-teachers, either alive or deceased, as well as of lineage founders. Sometimes, the altar may also feature the paintings or statues of buddhist or daoist deities. Incense is usually burnt at such an altar, and symbolic ceremonial offerings such as fruit may also be placed upon it.

== See also ==
- Chinese spiritual world concepts
- Ghosts in Chinese culture
- Joss paper – Sheets of paper made into burnt offerings in Chinese culture
- Jongmyo (shrine) – Confucian shrine in Seoul, South Korea
- Religious Confucianism – Confucianism as a religion
- Sacrifice to Heaven – East Asian noble religious ritual
- Patriarchal System – Ancient Chinese political system
- Chinese folk religion
- Unity of Heaven and humanity – Chinese philosophical concept
- Zhizha – Taoist paper art
- Religious goods store
