= Chinese ritual music =

Ancient Chinese social system

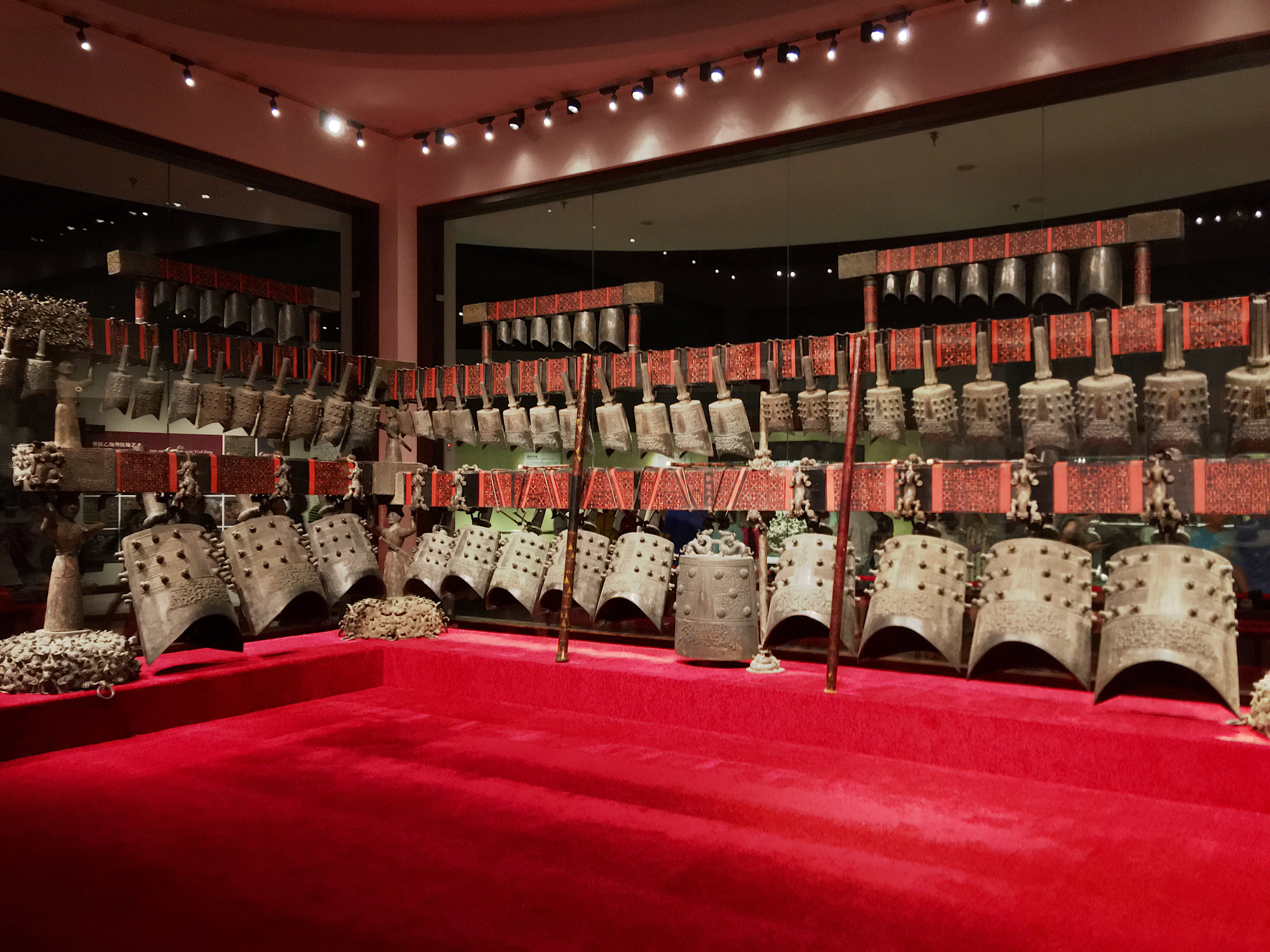
A set of bronze bells called bianzhong c. 5th century BC from Hubei

Chinese ritual music is the music used in the rituals of traditional Chinese religion. It is also described as the ritual and music system (Chinese: 礼乐制度; pinyin: Lǐ yuè zhìdù) because of its perceived importance in Chinese culture since the Zhou dynasty— particularly within Confucianism—to establishing and maintaining social order. Together with the patriarchal system, it constituted the social system of the entire ancient China and had a great influence on the politics, culture, art and thought of later generations. The feudal system and the Well-field system were two other institutions that developed at that time. According to legend it was founded by the Duke of Zhou and King Wu of Zhou.

The Ritual Music System is divided into two parts: ritual and music. The part of ritual mainly divides people's identity and social norms, and finally forms a hierarchy. The music part is mainly based on the hierarchical system of etiquette, using music to alleviate social conflicts.

The system developed from older shamanic traditions and was seen as having cosmological significance, it was seen as representing the balance between Yin and Yang and the Five Elements.

The regulations on ritual and music strengthened people's concept of hierarchy, played a symbolic role in establishing authority, alongside standardizing rule across the civilization.

== Predecessors ==
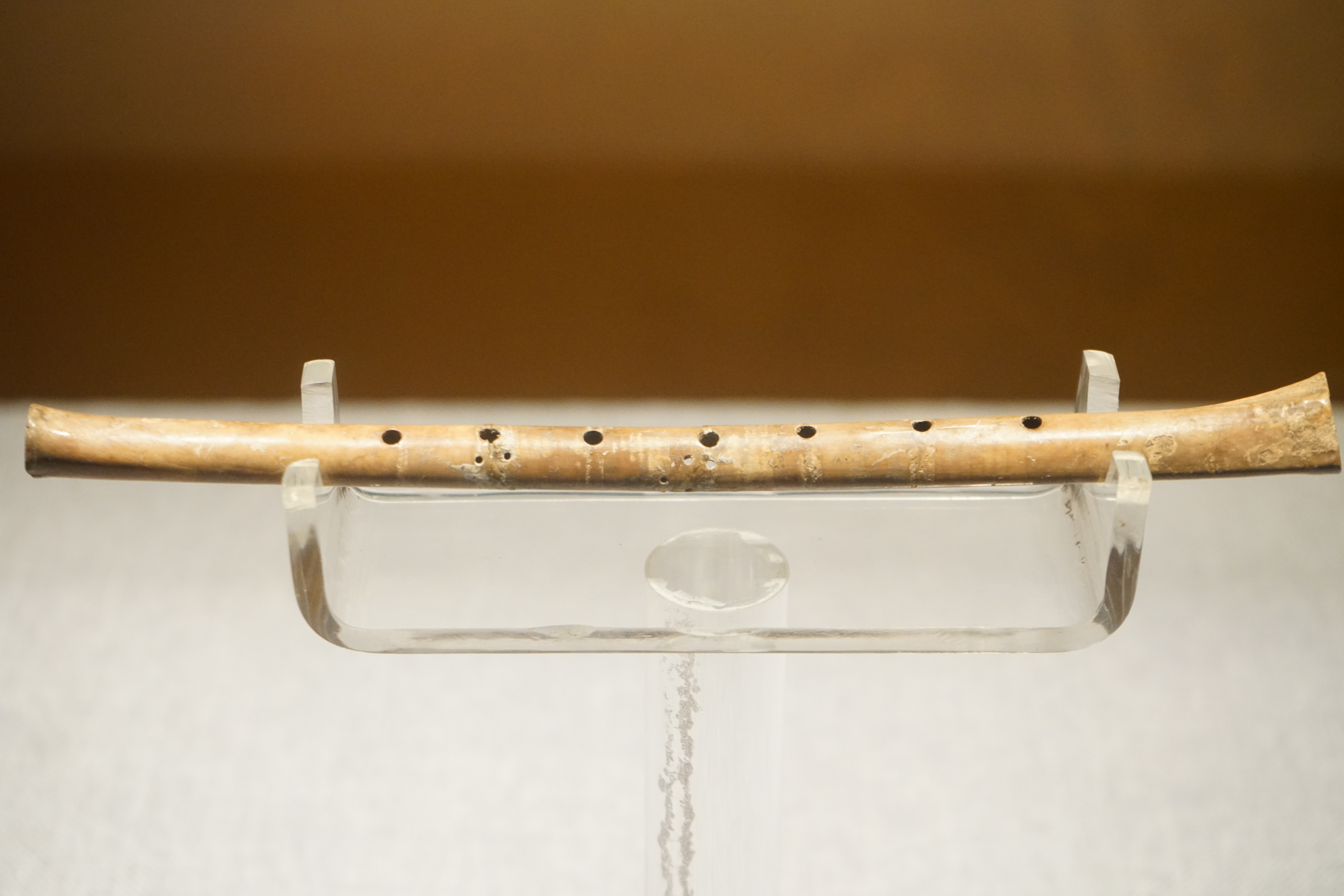
A 9,000 year-old bone flute from Henan

Archaeological evidence indicates that music culture developed in China from a very early period. Excavations in Jiahu Village in Wuyang County, Henan found bone flutes dated to 9,000 years ago, and clay music instruments called Xun thought to be 7,000 years old have been found in the Hemudu sites in Zhejiang and Banpo in Xi'an.

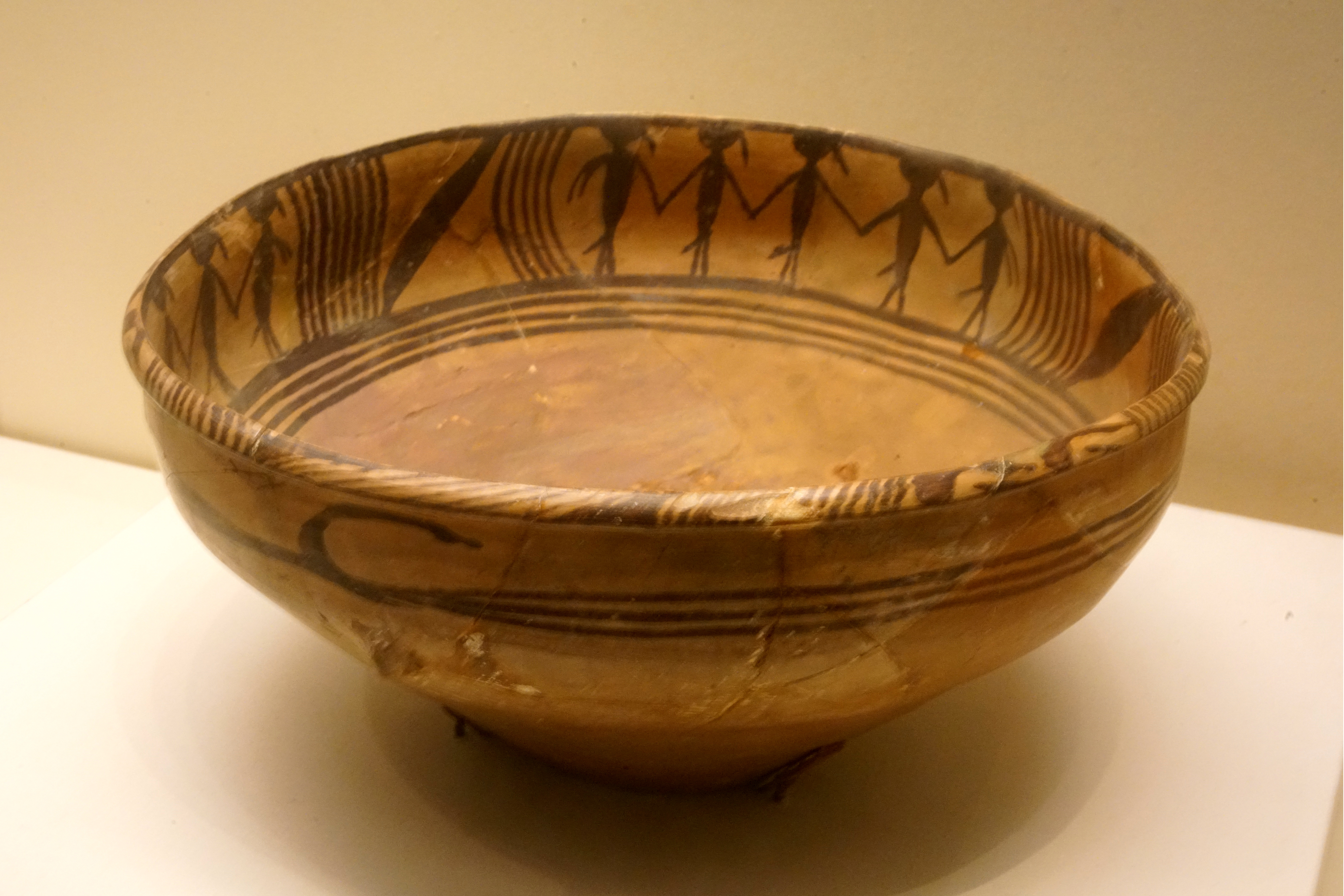
Bowl from the Majiayao culture (c.3300 – 2000 BC) decorated with figures of men dancing in line

Pictorial representations of dance have been found in Chinese pottery as early as the Neolithic period (before 2000 BC), showing people dancing in a line holding hands. The earliest Chinese character for "dance",, appears in the oracle bones and represents a dancer holding oxtails in each hand. According to the Lüshi Chunqiu (compiled around 239 BC): "In former times, the people of the Getian clan (葛天氏) would dance in pairs [or threes] with oxtails in hand, stamping their feet and singing eight stanzas."

Primitive dance in ancient China was also associated with sorcery and shamanic ritual. An early shape of the Chinese character for sorcerer, wu (巫), represented dancing shamans or their sleeves; wu therefore described someone who danced as a mean of communication between gods and men. There are many ancient records of shamans and sorcerers who danced, for example performing the rain dance at time of drought. The rain dance (舞雩, wǔyú) platform is mentioned in many ancient texts including the Analects of Confucius.

== Zhou Institution ==
According to tradition, yayue was created by the Duke of Zhou under commission from King Wu of Zhou, shortly after the latter's conquest of Shang. Incorporated within yayue were elements of shamanistic or religious traditions, as well as early Chinese folk music, which formed the backbone of the Ritual Music System. Dance was also closely associated with yayue music, each yayue pieces may have a ceremonial or ritual dance associated with it. The most important yayue piece of the Zhou dynasty were the Six Great Dances, each associated with a legendary or historical figure.

- Yunmen Dajuan (雲門大卷), from the Yellow Emperor era, performed for the veneration of the sky.
- Daxian (大咸, or Dazhang 大章), from the Emperor Yao era, for the veneration of the earth.
- Daqing (大磬, or Dashao 大韶), from the Emperor Shun era, for the veneration of Gods of the Four Directions, or the sun, moon, stars and seas, the dancers may have dressed up as birds and beasts. One of the earliest documents, Shujing, mentioned the ritual of "beating on the stones as all the wild animals dance". The performance of the dance was highly regarded by Confucius.
- Daxia (大夏), was a dance performed in praise of Yu the Great of the Xia dynasty, famous for his work on flood control. In this dance, 64 performers danced bare-chested wearing fur caps and white skirts. The movements of the dance may imitate the manual labour performed during flood control.
- Dahu (大濩), from Tang of Shang dating to the end of the Xia dynasty, for the veneration of female ancestors.
- Dawu (大武), in praise of King Wu of Zhou, used for ancestral worship. It was military focused in addition

Music in the Zhou dynasty was conceived as a cosmological manifestation of the sound of nature integrated into the binary universal order of yin and yang, and this concept has enduring influence later Chinese thinking on music. "Correct" music according to Zhou concept would involve instruments correlating to the five elements of nature and would bring harmony to nature. Around or before the 7th century BC, a system of pitch generation and pentatonic scale was derived from a cycle-of-fifths theory.

The Book of Rites records a number of situations where yayue might be performed. These included ceremonies in honour of Heaven and Earth, the gods or the ancestors. There were also detailed rules on the way they were to be performed at diplomatic meetings. Yayue was also used in outdoor activities, such as aristocratic archery contests, during hunting expeditions, and after the conclusion of a successful military campaign. Yayue was characterised by its rigidity of form. When performed, it was stately and formal, serving to distinguish the aristocratic classes. It was sometimes also accompanied by lyrics. Some of these are preserved in the Book of Songs.

== Spring and Autumn period reactions ==
With the decline of the importance of ceremony in the interstate relations of the Spring and Autumn period, so did yayue. Confucius famously lamented the decline of classical music and the rites. Marquess Wen of Wei was said to prefer the popular music of Wey and Zheng to the ancient court music, listening to which he may fall asleep. Confucius, faced with the social chaos of the Spring and Autumn period, strongly advocated the restoration of the Ritual Music System of the Western Zhou, and advocated "restoring rituals to oneself" and to social problems, and to be able to realize a harmonious society in which the world is "righteous."

Chinese philosophers took varying approaches to music. To Confucius, a correct form of music is important for the cultivation and refinement of the individual, and the Confucian system considers the formal music yayue to be morally uplifting and the symbol of a good ruler and stable government. Some popular forms of music, however, were considered corrupting in the Confucian view. Mozi on the other hand condemned making music, and argued in Against Music (非樂) that music is an extravagance and indulgence that serves no useful purpose and may be harmful. According to Mencius, a powerful ruler once asked him whether it was moral if he preferred popular music to the classics. The answer was that it only mattered that the ruler loved his subjects.

Confucius not only advocated the restoration of the Ritual Music System, but also practiced it physically. Legend has it that he asked Laozi about rituals and became so obsessed with music that he "did not know the taste of meat for three months".

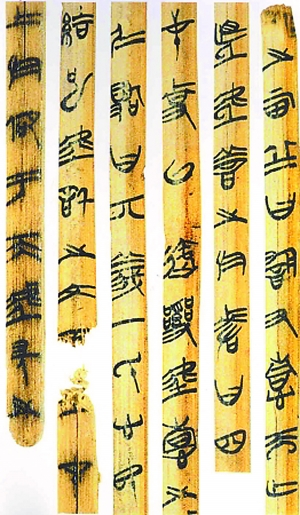
The Shijing or Classic of Poetry

Confucius heavily promoted the use of music with rituals or the rites order. The scholar Li Zehou argued that Confucianism is based on the idea of rites. Rites serve as the starting point for each individual and that these sacred social functions allow each person's human nature to be harmonious with reality. Given this, Confucius believed that "music is the harmonization of heaven and earth; the rites is the order of heaven and earth". Thus the application of music in rites creates the order that makes it possible for society to prosper.

The Confucian approach to music was heavily inspired by the Shijing and the Classic of Music, which was said to be the sixth Confucian classic until it was lost during the Han dynasty. The Shijing serves as one of the current Confucian classics and is a book on poetry that contains a diversified variety of poems as well as folk songs. Confucius is traditionally ascribed with compiling these classics within his school. In the Analects, Confucius described the importance of the art in the development of society:

The Master said, "My children, why do you not study the Book of Poetry?
"The Odes serve to stimulate the mind.
"They may be used for purposes of self-contemplation.
"They teach the art of sociability.
"They show how to regulate feelings of resentment.
"From them you learn the more immediate duty of serving one's father, and the remoter one of serving one's prince.
"From them we become largely acquainted with the names of birds, beasts, and plants."

In ancient China the social status of musicians was much lower than that of painters, though music was seen as central to the harmony and longevity of the state. Almost every emperor took folk songs seriously, sending officers to collect songs to record the popular culture. One of the Confucianist Classics, The Classic of Poetry, contained many folk songs dating from 800 BC to about 400 BC.

== Later history ==
The Imperial Music Bureau, first established in the Qin dynasty (221–207 BC), was greatly expanded under the emperor Han Wudi (140–87 BC) and charged with supervising court music and military music and determining what folk music would be officially recognized. In subsequent dynasties, the development of Chinese music was influenced by the musical traditions of Central Asia which also introduced elements of Indian music.

Zhou yayue was lost in the Han dynasty.

During the Han dynasty the bureau served a purpose of incorporating elements from folk music into ritual music. The music became increasingly secularized as it became more removed from its shamanic roots.

In the Tang dynasty incorporation of elements from popular music occurred once again.

During the Song dynasty, with Neo-Confucianism becoming the new orthodoxy, yayue was again in ascendancy with major development, and a yayue orchestra in this era consisted of over 200 instrumentalists. A notable ritual was called "The Great Feast" where the emperor would drink wine. Two important texts from the Song dynasty describing yayue performances are Zhu Xi's Complete Explanation of the Classic of Etiquette and Its Commentary (儀禮經傳通解) and Collection of Music (樂書) by Chen Yang (陳暘). In 1116, a gift of 428 yayue instruments as well as 572 costumes and dance objects was given to Korea by Emperor Huizong upon request by the Emperor Yejong of Goryeo. As a result, elements of Song dynasty yayue music such as melodies are still preserved in Korea.

Lowering faith in government meant a decline in the system in the Song and Ming dynasties.

Some forms of yayue survived for imperial ceremonies and rituals until the fall of the Qing dynasty when the imperial period of China came to an end. Yayue however was still performed as part of a Confucian ritual in China until the Communist takeover in 1949 when it completely disappeared. There has been a revival in yayue in Confucian ritual in Taiwan since the late 1960s, and in mainland China since the 1990s. A major research and modern reconstruction of yayue of the imperial court was initiated in Taiwan in the 1990s, and in mainland China a performance of yayue music in 2009 by Nanhua University's yayue music ensemble in Beijing also spurred interest in this form of music. There are however questions over the authenticity of these revived and recreated yayue music and dances, especially the use of modern forms of instruments and various substitutions rather than the more ancient and original forms, nonetheless some argued that such music and dances have always changed over time through succeeding dynasties, and that any changes introduced in the modern era should be seen in this light.

== Dance used for politics in the 20th century ==
In the early 20th century, there was a call to "make use of old forms" of literature and art as a means of connecting with the masses. Traditional Chinese dance forms were revised and propagated. In 1943, the Chinese Communist Party launched the new yangge movement where the yangge dance was adopted as a means of rallying village support. The new dance is a simplified version of the old dance with socialist elements such as the leader of the dance holding a sickle instead of umbrella, and it is also known as "struggle yangge" or "reform yangge".

== See also ==
- Theatre state
- Fengjian
- Patriarchal system
- Confucian ritual religion
- Music of China
- History of Chinese dance
- Yayue
