= Chosen family =

Alternative concept of family

Chosen family—also referred to as found family, or a family of choice—refers to non-biological kinship bonds that are intentionally formed, regardless of legal recognition. These relationships are often based on mutual care, support, and emotional connection. In contrast to the nuclear family, chosen family is created through voluntary association.

== In the LGBTQ community ==
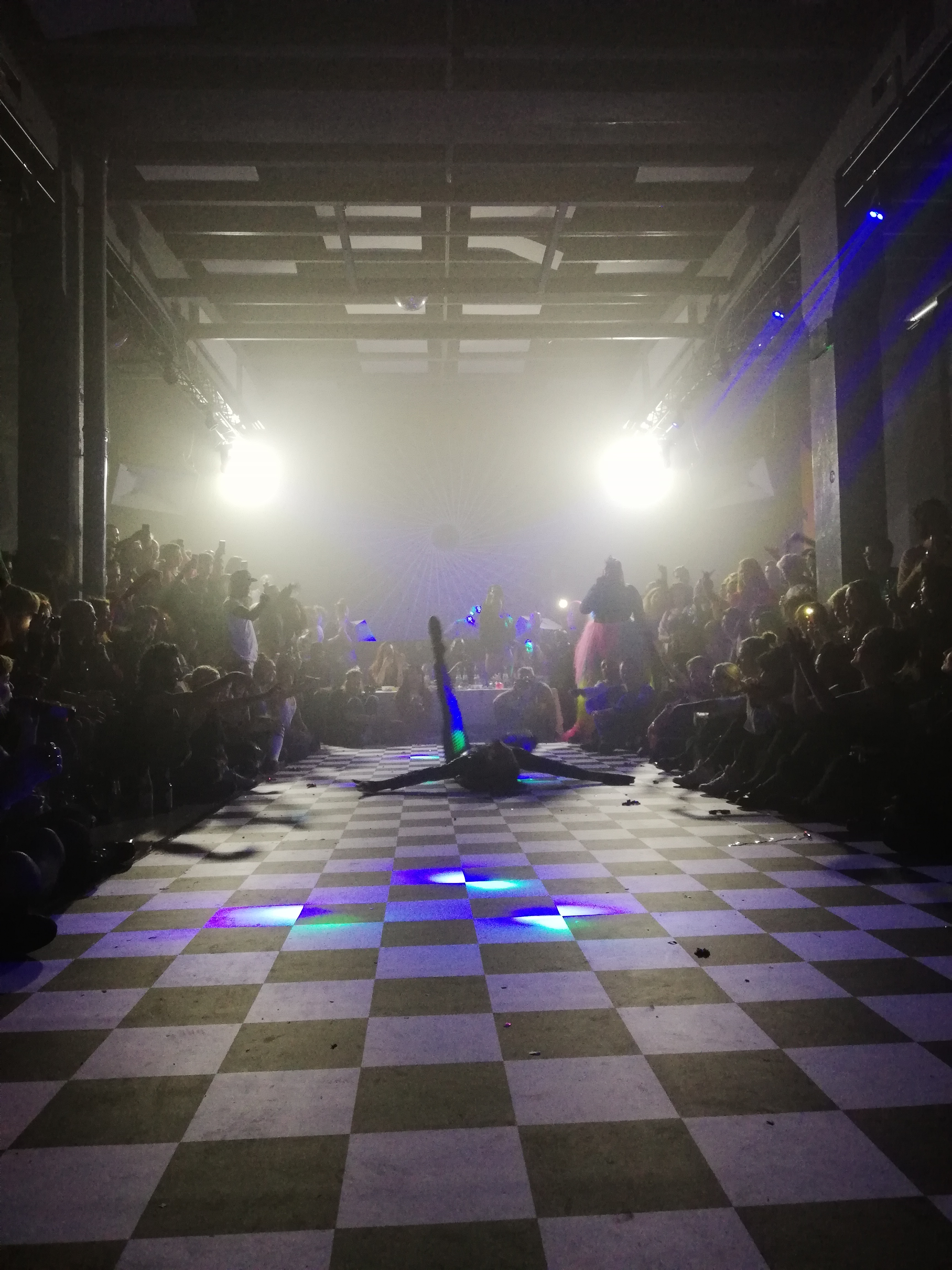
Ball culture in Berlin where individuals are voguing, a form of expression rooted in ball culture

LGBTQ individuals in particular often seek out chosen family when ostracized by their families of origin, leaving them in need of social support. Many LGBTQ people face rejection or shame from the families they were raised in upon coming out. Research indicates that in the absence of social support by an individual's family of origin, chosen family can promote psychological resilience. Early representation of chosen family can be seen in ball culture, also known as the house-ballroom community, where queer individuals would become apart of houses where they could find similar people wanting to improve their craft, and build a community of people with similar lived experiences.

Research suggests that experiencing of chosen family vary across LGBTQ+ communities. For LGBTQ+ refugees, chosen-family relationships can provide sources of social support in the context of migration, displacement, and separation from existing forms of alternative kinship that develop within community and educational settings.

== Social impacts ==
Those in marginalized groups are heavily impacted when rejected by their biological family. This is affected by the lack of research on families that do not align to concepts like the nuclear family.

Chosen family takes various forms and names, such as found family. Connections through chosen family can aid individuals that face many problems that arise from losing some or all support from their family of origin. Chosen family has a similar impact to events like Friendsgiving, which can be structured around being inclusive for all attendees.

== Functions ==
Chosen families can provide many of the forms of support associated with family relationships. Research with queer and transgender young adults has found that chosen family members may provide emotional support, companionship, practical assistance, and mutual care, including during periods of illness. These relationships can therefore involve responsibilities and forms of caregiving that extend beyond friendship. The importance of these relationships may be particularly significant when individuals have limited support from their families of origin.

Chosen family relationships do not necessarily replace relationships with biological or legal family members. Research involving LGBTQ+ children, youth, and their families has examined ways that chosen family and existing kin relationship can coexist and be connected through family and social services. As a result, chosen family can function alongside biological or legal family relationships rather than necessarily representing an alternative to them.

== Legal recognition and healthcare ==
Although chosen family members may fulfill many of the responsibilities traditionally associated with family, these relationships are not always legally recognized. This can create challenges in healthcare settings, particularly when individuals wish to designate chosen family members as caregivers or medical decision-makers. Without appropriate legal documentation, chosen family members may have limited authority to participate in medical decisions or access information about an individual's care.

== See also ==
- Adoption
- Clan
- Family
- Nuclear family
- Friendsgiving
