= Outer kins (Chinese) =

Outer kins (Chinese: 表親, 外戚, lit. "outer family", "out of household") is the kinship clan in Chinese patriarchy. This term usually referred to the maternal and all descendants of female members of the clan. After a woman was married (transplanted, "嫁") into a man's family, her husband's family possessed her. Her original family changed to "outer family". In clans or the empire, outer kins are usually not allowed to hold power because it disrupts the male-centered social order and network.

Outer kins usually have different surnames.

== Members ==
- Maternal grandfather (外祖父, 外公) and maternal grandmother (外祖母，外婆)
- Maternal uncles and aunts
- Maternal cousins.
- All descendants of female members of inner kins include daughters.

== See also ==
- Consort kin
- Inner kins (Chinese)
- chinese kin
- Patriarchal clan system
