= Chinese kin =

Family structures in Chinese culture

- Chinese: 宗族
Transcriptions
Standard Mandarin
- Hanyu Pinyin: zōngzú
Yue: Cantonese
- Jyutping: zung1 zuk6
Southern Min
- Hokkien POJ: chong-cho̍k

Alternative Chinese name
- Chinese: 家族
Transcriptions
Standard Mandarin
- Hanyu Pinyin: jiā zú
Yue: Cantonese
- Jyutping: gaa1 zuk6
Southern Min
- Hokkien POJ: ka-cho̍k

A Chinese kin, lineage or sometimes rendered as clan, is a patrilineal and patrilocal group of related Chinese people with a common surname sharing a common ancestor and, in many cases, an ancestral home.

Han Chinese culture is the culture of Han Chinese people. Various parts of Han Chinese culture may be shared with other ethnic groups in China and the Sinosphere while other parts of the culture differ greatly.

== Description ==
Chinese kinship tends to be strong in southern China, reinforced by ties to an ancestral village, common property, and often a common spoken Chinese dialect unintelligible to people outside the village. Kinship structures tend to be weaker in northern China, with clan members that do not usually reside in the same village nor share property.

== Han marriage taboos ==
Han Chinese traditionally regard patrilineal cousin marriage between paternal relatives of the same patrilineal clan (who carry the same surname) as taboo for example, the children of two brothers marrying each other. However marriage to non-patrilineal cousins is allowed such as marriage to a father's sister's children's or children of the mother's sisters and brothers. This taboo differentiates Han people from other ethnicities such as Hui people who marry their own paternal cousins.

== Han funeral practices ==
Han Chinese traditionally buried their dead and abhorred cremation.

Balinese women, Bugis women and other native women in Indonesia who married Han Chinese men were buried according to Chinese custom with Chinese characters on their gravestones instead of being cremated.

== Han patrilineal identity ==
The Han Chinese traditionally viewed Han as a patrilineal ethnicity traced only through the father's lineage, with all Han Chinese ultimately claiming descent from the Yellow emperor and organizing themselves in patrilineal clans. People of non-Han paternal lineages were rejected as Han which led to ethnic minorities to forge genealogies tracing ancestry to a male Han ancestor in order to attempt to pass as Han people.

A quote falsely attributed to Confucius claims that barbarians came become Chinese and Chinese could become barbarians by adopting each other's culture. This quote was actually made by Han Yu and falsely attributed to Confucius and the Classical Confucian texts which never said this and Han Yu was in fact only emphasizing one point, claiming that Buddhism, which he hated, might turn Chinese into barbarians and he was not discussing the possibility of barbarians becoming Chinese.

Han ethnicity is traced through the father and mothers are seen as empty receptacles.

Patricia Buckley Ebrey showed that traditionally Han Chinese traced their ethnicity through paternal descent and not only culture or language, those with Han fathers were Han regardless of the mother's ethnicity and Han Chinese never viewed anyone as "creoles" or "half breeds", rejecting the idea of blood quantum, viewing children solely as their father's ethnicity regardless of their physicals characteristics, even if they looked mixed Eurasian or white, as long as their father was Han Chinese, they were Han. Han Chinese believed that parents and children had the same blood and that they would mix together when put into water. Ebrey pointed out Han Chinese identity was affectively a massive group centered around paternal lineages and not on where someone was born, or their language or their physical looks (phenotype) but solely on their father, in contrast to western ideas about race. In order for non-Han people to claim to be Han and try to pass to assimilate, they had to fabricate genealogies tracing their paternal ancestor to a Han Chinese in order to convince other Han people that they were Han. Patricia Buckley Ebrey noted that since the Song dynasty tons of genealogies were written down, and in southern China, not a single Han Chinese ever traced their paternal ancestry from one of the local native ethnic minorities of the south, despite historical records showing that Chinese governments brought Confucian culture and beliefs to the local non-Han by opening schools. Believing in the genealogies alone as a truthful source would mean that not a single non-Han male who accepted Confucian culture ever left a descendant. Ebrey pointed out that there must have been at least some people in southern China who had native southern ethnic minority paternal origin in the Qing, Ming and Song but that they created genealogies showing northern Han Chinese ancestors who moved south in order to claim to be Han, because Han identity centered around paternal descent and not culture. Their genealogies all said their paternal ancestors were Han Chinese who came south in the Yuan, Song, Tang or Han dynasties. It was not about class but about ethnicity, since many southern Han claim ancestry from humble merchants and peasants and not only high status positions, but would never admit their paternal ancestor were natives. Han Chinese collectively called themselves the hundred surnames and viewed themselves as a collection of paternal clans. Henan was the place of origin of the Chen surname but people with the surname Chen outside of China and in China like Hebei, Guangxi, Shaanxi, and in Fujian where most of them live today are all potentially linked by the paternal lineage. Han Chinese paternal lineages could split apart for centuries and move to different areas but still recognized themselves as the same clan. The Han Chinese conception of ethnic identity as solely paternal meant hat Han Chinese could intermarry with non-Han women and the children would be considered Han so there was never such a concept as "half-breed" or "creole" in traditional China. So tens of thousands of people at a time could claim to be Han via just 1 Han man moving to southern China in the Song, Tang or Han dynasties.

Han Chinese organized their polygamous families around patrilineal descent and divided their wealth among their sons. Ebrey pointed out that Han Chinese identity was constructed around patrilineal ancestry from Han and Confucianism, and that non-Han Chinese tribals had to adopt Han surnames and fabricate genealogies showing Han Chinese paternal ancestors and the legendary ancestor of all Han Chinese, the Yellow Emperor as their ultimate ancestor. It was not based on language or race.

Ebrey wrote about how Han Chinese society was organized around patrilineal lineage clans with shared rites and rituals, graveyards, shared family property and wealth. Han Chinese lineage are paternal clans and keeps people linked after hundreds of years of separation with communal ancestral services and rituals as ancestral temples and communal resource pooling. Sons inherit property divided from their parents which helps the government collect taxes while daughters do not receive them since they marry into other families.

Late 19th century reformers like Kang Youwei and Liang Qichao did not copy word for word western racial theorists like Herbert Spencer or Charles Darwin, but simply took the word "race" and applied traditional Han Chinese definitions to the western word "race", such as merely using race as synonymous with traditional Chinese patrilineal lineages. They then compared indigenous traditional Han Chinese lineage feuding between different clans to competition between different races like red, black, browns, whites and yellows.

Ebrey wrote about the ancestral halls Han Chinese built for their paternal lineages.

Many Han Chinese Cantonese in the 19th century Pearl river delta had genealogies claiming their paternal ancestors migrated in the Song dynasty to Guangdong from central China, after the Southern Han was conquered by the Song dynasty, as their genealogies were examined by David Faure. There was only sea in the region in the 10th century during the Southern Han.

== Official dynastic views on Han identity ==
Han people originally used Hua as their endonym to call their own ethnic group. The Xianbei Tuoba wanted to make Hua into the cultural and civilisational term so they could be included under it by culture and civilisation and make Han the ethnic term for what was previously called Hua. for The Xianbei emphasised that Han was a distinct ethnic group by blood from Xianbei, with them encouraging use of the Han term, in order to include themselves under the cultural and civilisational terms Hua and Zhongguoren while still maintaining Xianbei and Han as different ethnic identities. The Manchu Yongzheng emperor maintained that Han was a distinct ethnic group and that Manchus were not assimilating into Han, saying that when using Hua as an ethnic term for Han, Manchus were not Hua, but Yi (which meant non-Hua), but only if Hua purely mean civilized and was not used as an ethnic term, then Manchus were culturally part of Hua/Zhonghua and culturally Chinese, saying "Manchu blood differs from Han blood, in the same way as Mongol and Tibetan blood too differs from Han blood", emphasising that Manchu and Han would always be different ethnic groups by blood but by culture and civilisation both Manchu and Han were Zhonghua.

The first Ming Emperor Zhu Yuanzhang and a Ming officials quoted the Chinese classic Zuo zhuan which said "fei wo zulei, qi xin biyi" (the thoughts and feelings of those who are not of our descent group are invariable different) when they were against Han surnames being adopted by non-Han such as Mongols, and said that non-Han ethnicities and Mongols should not confuse themselves with Han by adopting Han surnames but instead take their own unique surnames. The Ming Emperor reprimanded non-Han ethnicities like Hui (seren) and Mongols for changing their original names and trying to hide their barbarian origins saying they would forget their origins in 1370. This indicated many Han were rejected the idea that non-Han could become Han solely by adopting Han culture and Confucianism, and thought only people of Han paternal descent could be Han.

The Qing dynasty used Han as a descriptor of a coherent ethnic group apart of the Yi (barbarian) ethnic minorities of southwest China in the 19th century such as an 1803 memorial which talks about trying to differentiate Han from Yi.

== Paternal Descent from the Yellow Emperor ==
Han dynasty historian Sima Qian traced ancestry of people in China back to the Yellow Emperor and this habit in China stretched back to his time, and continued to the Qing dynasty where Han Chinese viewed him as ancestors of the Han race. Many people with the same surname and lineages traced their ancestor back to one primal ancestor, the shizu and all the branches claimed descent from them, and by analogy all Han lineages were descended from the Yellow Emperor.

Ebrey noted that Song and Tang dynasty era genealogies and Han dynasty era genealogies (Sima Qian) claimed the Yellow emperor has their ancestor.

The Yellow Emperor was claimed as the ancestor by the Song Zhenzong emperor.

Contrary to the false claim that Han Chinese only started in the 20th century to claim the Yellow Emperor as ancestor, medieval Han Chinese in the Song dynasty and Tang dynasty both claimed the Five Emperors including the Yellow emperor as their paternal ancestor in genealogies as this stretched back to the Western Han dynasty with Sima Qian. Han Chinese were made out of a group of people who saw themselves as related to each other by paternal descent and descended from the Yellow Emperor. The Han dynasty Emperors claimed descent from YAo, one of the five emperors and a descendant of the Yellow Emperor. Yao and the Yellow emperor's great-grandson Di Gao were claimed as paternal ancestors of a female named Liu on a grave dated to 642 and one of the Yellow Emperor's sons, Di Shaohao was claimed as paternal ancestor on Zhang Rui's grave in 632 and Yu the Great was claimed as paternal ancestors of Guan Daoai in 627 and the Yellow Emperor's grandson Di Kaoyang was claimed as paternal ancestor by Wei Kuangbo in 617. These were recorded in "Tangdai muzhiming huibian fukao" listed by Mao Hanguang in the first volume.

The Chu, Zhao, Qi and Qin noble families as well as the Xia dynasty traced their ancestry from the Yellow Emperor.

Across Guangdong, three million people surnamed Huang claim descent from the same paternal ancestor, Huang Qiaoshan who lived in the Tang dynasty and migrated to Fujian at the end of the dynasty, via three of his sons (out of 21) who founded different branches, found among the Hakka, Chaoshan and Cantonese. Among them are the Longgang, Kengxi village Hakka Huang, the Cantonese "guangfu" Huang native to Shenzhen in the villages of Shangsha & Xiasha & the Chaoshan Huang. Huang Qiaoshan lived from 872 to 953 and claimed he was the Yellow Emperor's 128th generation descendant. Huang Moutang who was born in 1183 and was Huang Qiaoshan's 15th generation descendant is the ancestor of the Cantonese guangfu Huang clans. One of his descendants was Huang Siming from whom the Xiasha Huang descent. Huang Qiaoshan's 9th generation descendant Huang Liao was a Song official and his descendant Huang Chaoxuan during the Ming-Qing transition was the ancestor of the Longgang, Kengzi village Hakka Huang. The Huang descendants who migrated and established linages in the Song were Cantonese speakers while the Huang descendants who migrated to the coast in the Ming-Qing transition spoke Hakka.

== Ethnic minorities forging genealogies ==
=== Di people ===
Lü Guang was ethnically Di (although he claimed ancestry from an ethnically Han man named Lü Wenhe (呂文和) who fled from Pei County (in modern Xuzhou, Jiangsu, the same county that Han Dynasty emperors' ancestors came) from a disaster and who settled in Di lands).

=== Turkic people ===
Non-Han Chinese like Li Bo (Li Bai) tried to appear as Han by falsely claiming Han Chinese paternal ancestors like Laozi.

Non-Han Chinese in the Tang dynasty edited their genealogies to show Han surnames and paternal Han Chinese ancestors stretching back to the Han dynasty in order to portray themselves as Han. Non-Han claimed their Han ancestors long ago were people who moved off west or were captured by nomads such as Li Ling. Li Bo claimed a fictive Han ancestor who went west in his genealogy. Other non-Han traced their ancestors to the Han legendary ancestor, the Yellow Emperor.

The official history Old History of the Five Dynasties stated that the Shatuo Turk Shi Jingtang's family was originally descended from Shi Que (石碏), an official of the Spring and Autumn period state Wey, through the Han prime minister Shi Fen (石奮), and further stated that Shi Fen's descendants fled west when Han fell, settling in what would eventually become Gan Prefecture (甘州, in modern Zhangye, Gansu), apparently in an attempt to try to link Shi with a Han Chinese ancestry despite the Shatuo origin.

The Shatuo Turk Liu Zhyuan claimed patrilineal Han ancestry from the Han dynasty itself.

=== Bohai ===
As Balhae descendants became firmly incorporated into the apparatus of the Jin dynasty, many individual Balhae-descended officials tried to fabricate genealogies to appear as Han. In 1135, Nansali was chosen as an emissary to Goryeo, for which he changed his name to the Sinitic Wang Zheng. Wang Tingyun also invented a genealogy record on his epitaph tracing his lineage to Taiyuan rather than Liaodong. The epitaph acknowledges that his most recent ancestors were in the employ of Balhae but added that they only "lived dispersed among the eastern barbarians", rejecting his Balhae identity. The practice of inventing fictitious genealogies to hide ancestry outside of the "Central Territories" was widespread from Song times onward.

=== Zhuang and Bouyei ===
The majority of Zhuang people at one point falsely claimed to be Han and grafted a Han ancestors onto their genealogies, in a Guangxi district, all 152 Zhuang clans said they were Han. The PRC government refused and rejected the Zhuang's claims to be Han and helped build the Zhuang ethnicity for these Tai speakers. Many of the Zhuang rejected the identification as ethnic Zhuang and said they were Han in the 1950s. Many Zhuang falsely self-identified as "Han who can speak the Zhuang language" and tried to reject the Communist party's attempt at classifying them as Zhuang and rejecting the Zhuang label in the 1953 census since they viewed being an ethnic minority as a stigma. The Communist party ignored the Zhuang objections and went ahead classifying them as Zhuang. Many Zhuang people falsely claimed their paternal ancestors were Han Chinese from Huguang (Hubei and Hunan), Jiangnan who had migrated to Guangxi and Bouyei people in Guizhou also claimed Han Chinese Jiangnan paternal ancestry from Jiangsu. Bouyei people (Zhongjia) in Guizhou and Zhuang in Guangxi tried to claim false Han paternal ancestors in order to pass as Han people, with the Bouyei making genealogies with a Han ancestors and claimed their ancestors came from Jiangnan, Hubei and Hunan (Huguang) and Shandong. The Zhuang also did this up to the 1950s and claimed their ancestors were northern Han Chinese and made fake genealogies to show it to escape marginalization and discrimination. The Communists made the Zhuang self identify as Zhuang and stop pretending to be Han.

Many ethnic minority Zhuang families in southwest China including that of Tusi chieftains fabricated genealogies claiming their paternal ancestors were northern Han Chinese. Zhuang claimed fake Han ancestry in the Anping chiefdom. Zhuang adopted Han Chinese style ancestral halls, Han ideas like fang in their lineage rules and fake Han ancestors in their genealogies.

=== Manchu ===
The Manchu Duanfang of the Tohoro clan claimed his paternal ancestor was Han Chinese man surname Tao from Zhejiang when he was begging for his life from Han revolutionaries.

During the Republic of China, a Manchu falsely claimed paternal Han origin by claiming to belong to Han Chinese President Lin Sen's clan and claiming his origin was from Minhou in Fujian and that he was from the Lin clan. Another Manchu fabricated Han background and claiming his named was Li Chengyin to get a physician's license. He was a son of Chongtai, a Qing official.

=== Taiwan Aboriginal ===
The Republic of China in Taiwan formerly classified children by their father's ethnicity, children of Taiwan Aboriginal mothers and Han Chinese fathers were classified as Han while children of Han Chinese mothers and Aboriginal fathers were classified as Taiwan Aboriginals. Manchus concealed their genealogies during this period.

== Hui and Tanka ==
Han Chinese also group other ethnicities based on descent alone, not by religion, economy or language, considering the descendants of foreign Muslims as Hui people and not as Han despite speaking the same language and no longer practicing Islam.

The Hui Guo family of Baiqi in Quanzhou, Fujian, falsely claimed their paternal ancestor was Han Chinese general Guo Ziyi from the Tang dynasty in order to mask their Hui ethnicity.

The Hui Ding family of Chendai in Quanzhou, Fujian, falsely claimed their paternal ancestor was Han Chinese scholar official Ding Du (an author of Wujing Zongyao from the Song dynasty in order to mask their Hui ethnicity.

Hui in the Philippines are non-Muslim and they live among Catholic Filipinos in Manila and do not live among the Moro Muslims. Two Hui families in Quanzhou, Southern Fujian, the Chendai Ding family and Baiqi Guo family mostly left Islam during the Ming dynasty and the majority of their descendants practice other religions but identify as ethnically Hui and not Han, making them non-Muslim Hui. They have immigrated to the Philippines, Malaysia and Singapore and many of these overseas Ding are ashamed of having distant Islamic ancestry and don't want to talk about it. The Minnan pronunciation of Ding is Teng hence the non-Muslim Hui in the northern Philippines are surnamed Teng.

Some of the Hui members of families that left Islam during the early Ming dynasty like the Guo of Baiqi in Quanzhou even believe negative false stereotypes about their own Muslim ancestors, with one Christian Guo saying his Hui ancestors were descendants from donkey human sexual intercourse and falsely claiming that altars with hidden images of humans having sex with donkeys were found in their temple (mosques). In the 1920s his family converted to Christianity.

The ex-Muslim Hui masqueraded as Han for a while by claiming paternal Han descent from famous heroes like Guo Ziyi for the Baiqi Gui clan since Han ethnic identity is paternally based. The ex-Muslim Hui whose members left Islam settled overseas including Taiwan and in Manila in the Philippines where Ding Wenqi and Guo Fuyou wrote an essay attempting to falsely claim that the 5 famous Hui clans of Quanzhou that left Islam, Bai, Jin, Ma, Ding and Guo were descended from Han Chinese general Guo Ziyi and 4 of his generals Jin Zhujie, Ding Hunzhen, Ma Lin and Bai Yuanguang when he was fighting against the invading Tibetans to save Tang dynasty China and that they formed an association of 5 clans, the Qingzhen five surname association, leaving out all mention of their actual Muslim foreign origins except for the word "Qingzhen" (Halal) in the title while continuing to push the fiction that they were in China before the Yuan dynasty and that Guo was of paternal Han descent. The actual general was named Hun Zhen (Hun Jian) from the Tiele Hun tribe (the reason for his surname) and was not surnamed Ding, but the Ding concocted a fictional version of him and gave him the Ding surname to fit the fiction of four generals with the same surnames as the Hui clans in Quanzhou serving under Guo Ziyi. The members of the Ding and Guo clans on Taiwan also cling to the fictitious paternal ancestry to pretend to be Han instead of Hui.

The Han Chinese official and merchant Su Tangshe who married Muslim Semu women from Pu Shougeng's family after converting to Islam was descended from Su Song according to one historian. His descendants are no longer Muslim and identify as Han due to their Han paternal ancestry and do not consider themselves Hui since their Hui ancestry is through a woman. The Han Chinese Su family in Quanzhou regained its wealth after the Han man Su Tangshe married Hui Semu Muslim women from Pu Shougeng's family and used his family connections to Pu.

The former Muslim Hui Ding, Jin and Guo families of Quanzhou who abandoned Islam and ethnic minorities like the She people and Tanka (Dan) people forged genealogies claiming their paternal ancestors were famous Han Chinese from northern China during the Zhou dynasty, Han dynasty or Tang dynasty who later migrated south to Fujian, in order to pass as Han people but in the modern day now acknowledge their true Hui ancestry, while the Ma family of Quanzhou proudly proclaimed their Hui origin the entire time. The Hui of Quanzhou have the surnames Guo 郭, Ding 丁, Jin 金, Xia 夏, Pu 蒲, Die 迭 and Ma 馬.

Only a few local Hui in Quanzhou still practice Islam like the Huang family, with most Muslims being Hui migrant workers from Gansu while most local Hui are non-Muslims since their ancestors left Islam centuries before like many Guo and Ding who are now Christian and other religions.

A Hui Muslim descendant of Gabuman (葛卜满), an envoy of the Calicut kingdom in India, raised funds for the Fuzhou mosque in 1541 to rebuild it after a fire.

Half Tanka historian Miranda Brown (Dong Muda) tweeted about Tanka history of fabricating genealogies in an attempt to claim to be descended from northern Han.

== Zupu—the genealogy book ==
A zupu (simplified Chinese: 族谱; traditional Chinese: 族譜; pinyin: zúpǔ; Pe̍h-ōe-jī: Cho̍k-phó͘) is a Chinese kin register or genealogy book, which contains stories of the kin's origins, male lineage and illustrious members. The register is usually updated regularly by the eldest person in the extended family, who hands on this responsibility to the next generation. The "updating" of one's zupu (simplified Chinese: 修族谱; traditional Chinese: 修族譜; pinyin: xiū zúpǔ; Pe̍h-ōe-jī: Siu cho̍k-phó͘) is a very important task in Chinese tradition, and can be traced back thousands of years. After several generations, the local clan lineage will often publish a compendium of these zupus. The overwhelming majority of zupus remain in private hands, though a large number may be found in the Peking University, Shanghai Library, Cornell University and Tōyō Bunko.

== Chinese lineage associations ==
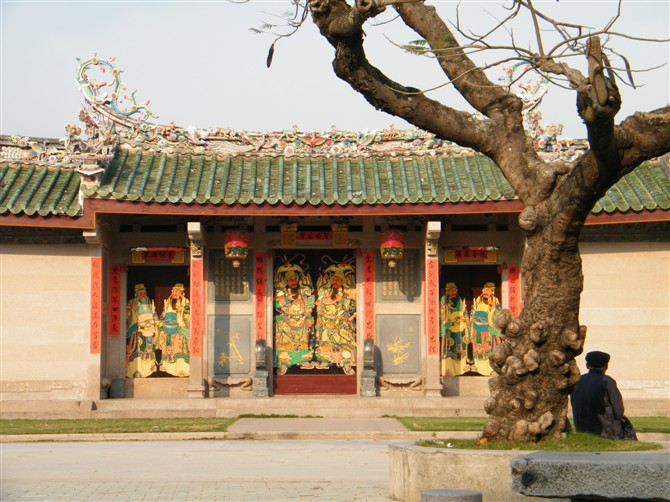
Cài family ancestral temple in Shantou, Guangdong

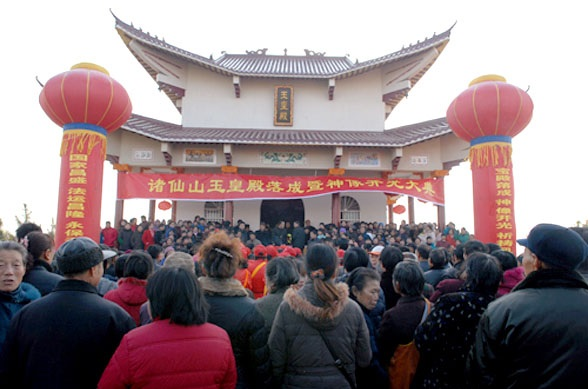
People foregather for a worship ceremony at an ancestral shrine in Hong'an, Hubei.

Chinese lineage associations, also kinship or ancestral associations (simplified Chinese: 宗族社会; traditional Chinese: 宗族社會; pinyin: zōngzú shèhuì; Pe̍h-ōe-jī: Chong-cho̍k Siā-hōe or simplified Chinese: 宗族协会; traditional Chinese: 宗族協會; pinyin: zōngzú xiéhuì; Pe̍h-ōe-jī: Chong-cho̍k Hia̍p-hōe), are a type of social relationship institutions found in Han Chinese ethnic groups and the fundamental unit of Chinese ancestral religion. They gather people who share the same surname belonging to the same kin, who often have the same geographical origin (ancestral home), and therefore the same patron deities. They are not seen as distinct from the Chinese kin itself, but rather as its corporate form. These institutions and their corporeal manifestations are also known as lineage churches or kinship churches (Chinese: 宗族堂; pinyin: zōngzú táng; Pe̍h-ōe-jī: Chong-cho̍k-tông), or, mostly on the scholarly level, as Confucian churches, although this term has principally other different meanings.

Chinese kinship associations provide guanxi (social network) to members and they build and manage ancestral shrines or temples dedicated to the worship of the progenitors of the kins as their congregational centers, where they perform rites of unity.

A lineage is a corporation, in the sense that members feel to belong to the same body, are highly conscious of their group identity, and derive benefits from jointly owned property and shared resources. Benefit derives from the surplus income of ancestral shrines and homes, which is reinvested by the managers or shared out in yearly dividends. Benefit of belonging to a lineage can also be measured in terms of protection and patronage. Ancestral temples also support local schools and engage in charitable work.

Different lineages may develop through the opposite processes of fusion and segmentation. They can also be dispersed and fragmented into "multi-lineage areas" or concentrated in one place, or "single-lineage area".

== Ancestral shrine ==
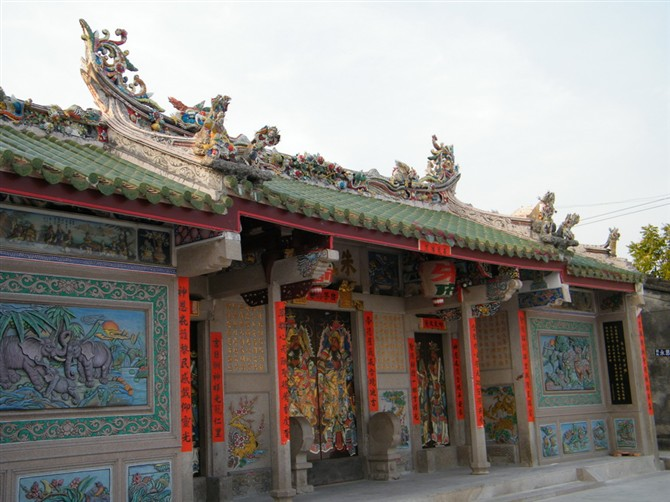
Gé family ancestral shrine in Shantou, Guangdong

Ancestral temples or shrines are the congregation places of lineage associations, by whom they are built and managed. These temples are devoted to the worship of the progenitors of a certain kin, where the kin members meet and perform rites of unity and banquets.

== Variations ==
=== Consort kinship ===
In Imperial times, a consort kin was a kin with special status due to its connection with an emperor. Throughout Chinese history, consort kins have exercised great power at various times. There have been several usurpations of power by consorts, the most notable being the Han dynasty's Empress Dowager Lü (Chinese: 呂后; pinyin: Lǚ hòu), the Tang dynasty's Empress Wu (simplified Chinese: 武则天; traditional Chinese: 武則天; pinyin: Wǔ Zétiān; Pe̍h-ōe-jī: Bú Chek-thian), and the Qing dynasty's Empress Dowager Cixi (Chinese: 慈禧太后; pinyin: Cíxǐ tàihòu). The Han dynasty usurper Wang Mang was a nephew of the Grand Empress Dowager Wang.

=== Qing period ===
During the Qing dynasty, the imperial government encouraged Chinese kins to take up some quasi-governmental functions such as those involving social welfare and primary education.

== See also ==
- Inner kins (Chinese)
- Outer kins (Chinese)
- Chinese folk religion
- Confucianism
- Chinese ancestral worship
- Ancestral shrine & Ancestor tablets
- Chinese surname—Hundred Family Surnames
- Ancestral home
- Guanxi
- Kongsi
- Xungen movement, the contemporary reconstruction of lineages in China
- Ethnic interest group
