= Same-surname marriage =

Marriage of people with the same surname, esp. in Asia

Chinese name
- Traditional Chinese: 同姓不婚
- Literal meaning: Same surname, no marriage
Transcriptions
Standard Mandarin
- Hanyu Pinyin: tóng xìng bù hūn
Yue: Cantonese
- Yale Romanization: tùhng sing bāt fān

Vietnamese name
- Vietnamese alphabet: Miễn là cùng họ

Korean name
- Hangul: 동성동본
- Hanja: 同姓同本
- Literal meaning: Same surname, same ancestor

Japanese name
- Kanji: 同姓不婚

Same-surname marriage is the marriage of two people of the same surname. Historically, same-surname marriage was considered a taboo or prohibited in China and other East Asian cultures influenced by China.

== East Asia ==
=== China ===
Initially, ancient China did not have regulation on endogamy during the Xia and Shang dynasties. A policy against same-surname marriage was first instituted during the Western Zhou. In his interpretation of the Book of Rites, philosopher Zheng Xuan compared same-surname marriage to zoophilia, and called it blasphemous; indicating the seriousness of the Zhou dynasty's opposition to it. Confucianism opposed same-surname marriage because it thought that it would lead to weakness in reproduction of offspring. Both the Guoyu and the Zuo zhuan attributed the lack of same-surname couples to concerns with their offspring.

Although Confucianism opposed same-clan name marriage, the taboo did not originate from Confucianism, and opposition to same-clan name marriage later gained support outside Confucianism. Same-surname marriage formed part of the traditional Chinese marriage system, where men and women within the same extended family were not permitted to marry, just as is the case in many patriarchal societies.

The Han dynasty did not have any statute prohibiting marriage between men and women of the same surname. Wang Mang's marriage to Empress Wang indicates that same-surname marriage was not socially unacceptable during that period, if the couple do not share the same kin. Emperor Xiaowen reintroduced a law prohibiting same-surname marriage during the Northern Wei, with a usual penalty of capital punishment. The Tang dynasty law continued to treat same-surname marriage as a crime, punishable by two years of imprisonment. The Ming and Qing dynasties inherited the prohibition on same-surname marriage from Tang dynasty law; the prohibition was abolished towards the end of the Qing dynasty via judicial reforms, allowing men and women of the same surname and different kin to marry. In 1950, the People's Republic of China passed its New Marriage Law, which reduced restrictions on same-surname marriage to lineal blood relatives.

=== Taiwan ===
During the Ming Zheng and Qing dynasty periods, the practice of same-surname marriage was legally prohibited and socially stigmatized among Han Chinese migrants from Fujian and Guangdong. Despite lacking hereditary surnames like Han Chinese, similar marriage taboo existed among Taiwanese indigenous peoples, where intermarriage within the same patrilineal clan was prohibited. However, when some tribes of Plains Indigenous peoples collectively adopted Chinese surnames, marriages among different clans of the same tribe, which shared the same Chinese surnames, continued. One notable example was the Pan family of Anli Commune, whose practice of same-surname marriage drew satire from Han Chinese communities.

Under Japanese rule, same-surname marriage was made legal. Following the Retrocession of Taiwan in 1945, the Republic of China Civil Code took effect in Taiwan, which similarly legalized same-surname marriage. Social stigma surrounding the practice persisted and gradually weakened over the ensuing decades.

Currently, Taiwanese law does not prohibit marriage based on shared surname, but instead only prohibiting people who are related by blood within the sixth degree of relationship (second cousins). According to statistics from the Ministry of the Interior, as of 2014 there are 174,350 same-surname couples in Taiwan, including one couple with the same surname and given name.

=== Korea ===
During the Three Kingdoms period, same-surname marriage was prevalent among the royal family and aristocracies of the Silla kingdom, in order to maintain the bloodline and strengthen royal authority. King Taejong Muyeol, for instance, was the son of King Jinji and Princess Cheonmyeong, the daughter of King Jinpyeong; and Queen Jinseong married her uncle Kim Wi–Hong. Even in the early Goryeo dynasty, same-surname marriage in the royal family was very common, and even marriages between half-siblings were performed. However, from the middle of the Goryeo period, due to the influence of Confucianism, marriages between close relatives started to decline, and eventually disappeared by the end of the Goryeo dynasty. During the Joseon dynasty, when Confucianism became the founding ideology of the nation, marriage between people with the same last name and ancestral family was strictly prohibited, and even marriages with relatives from the maternal blood were banned unless the parties only share a blood relative after the sixth degree (second cousins). The prohibition of same-surname marriage was recognized as part of Korean customary law during the Japanese colonial period. Following the division of Korea, the laws concerning family and marriage began to diverge. North Korean law does not formally ban marriage between people with the same last name, while the Civil Code of Republic of Korea inherited the prohibition on same-surname marriage from the colonial era. The prohibition on same-surname marriage was continuously challenged in South Korea since the introduction of the Civil Code. Opponents argued that it was not feasible to ban such marriage simply due to surname, since the family name system in South Korea has been developed to a point where it became difficult to confirm the kinship between people with the same last name. On 16 July 16 1997, the Constitutional Court of Korea ruled that the prohibition on same-surname marriage was inconsistent with the constitution, and the law would be suspended in 1999. Currently, South Korean laws only ban marriage between people who share a blood relative within the eighth degree (third cousins), whether or not the couple in question shares the same surname.

=== Vietnam ===
Confucian customs concerning same-surname marriage reached Vietnam during Chinese rule, although they were not applied uniformly across different regions and social classes. The Lý dynasty and Trần dynasty both practiced intra-clan marriage within their royal houses. Under influence of Neo-Confucianism, laws during the early part of the Lê dynasty included provisions prohibiting same-surname marriage, similar to the legal provision in China. The phrase Miễn là cùng họ ("as long as the same surname") is often used.

Under the Nguyễn dynasty, the prohibition of same-surname marriage was formalized in the legal code Hoàng Việt luật lệ, published in 1813 under Gia Long. Its enforcement remained inconsistent, especially in rural areas. In practice, marriages between people with the same surname were permitted when they belonged to unrelated lineages, or different branches of the same extended family.

During the French colonial rule, Vietnamese traditional legal system was gradually replaced by French-style civil legislation, and the legal prohibition of same-surname marriage was replaced by prohibition of close kins. Later, marriage laws in both North Vietnam and South Vietnam kept the prohibition of marriage among close kins, instead of reconstituting prohibition of same-surname marriage from pre-colonial era. Upon the Unification of Vietnam in 1975, these principles were applied nationwide.
