= Spirit tablet =

Ritual object in East Asian ancestor veneration

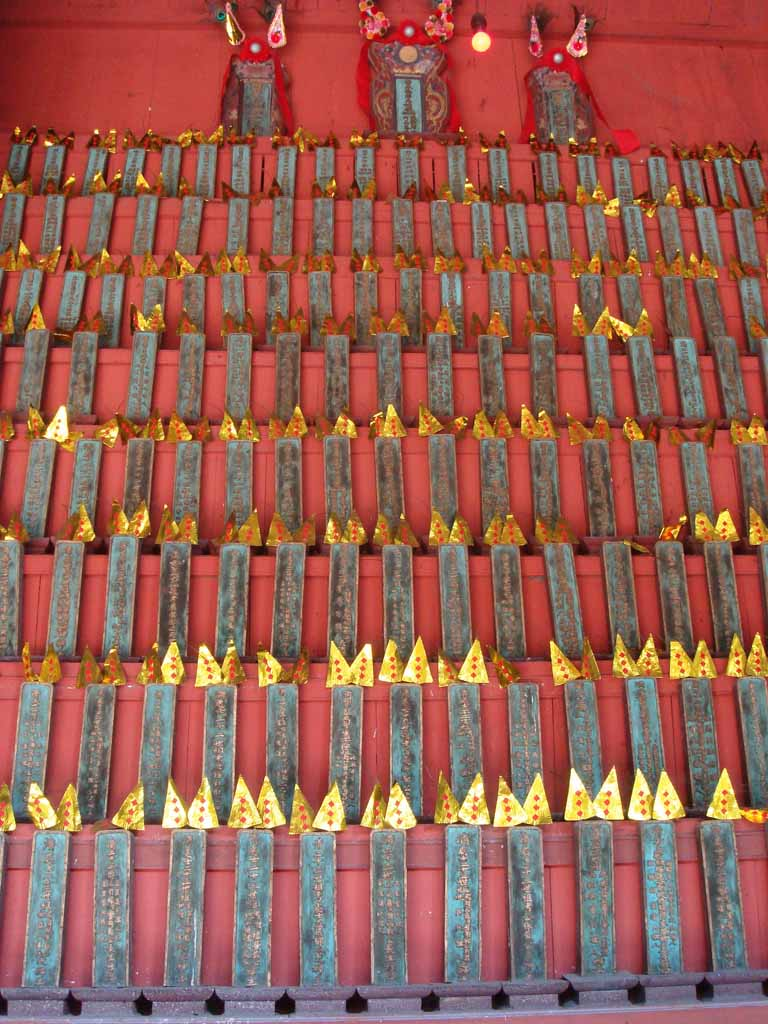
- Spirit tablets for ancestors in Hong Kong

Chinese name
- Chinese: 神主牌
- Literal meaning: spirit master sign
Transcriptions
Standard Mandarin
- Hanyu Pinyin: shénzhǔpái
Yue: Cantonese
- Yale Romanization: sàhn jyú pàaih
- Jyutping: san4 zyu2 paai4
Southern Min
- Hokkien POJ: sîn-chú-pâi
Eastern Min
- Fuzhou BUC: sîng-njū-wè

Alternative Chinese name
- Chinese: 神位
- Literal meaning: spirit seat
Transcriptions
Standard Mandarin
- Hanyu Pinyin: shénwèi
Yue: Cantonese
- Yale Romanization: sàhn waih
- Jyutping: san4 wai6
Southern Min
- Hokkien POJ: sîn-ūi
Eastern Min
- Fuzhou BUC: sîng-njū

Second alternative Chinese name
- Chinese: 神牌
- Literal meaning: spirit sign
Transcriptions
Standard Mandarin
- Hanyu Pinyin: shénpái
Yue: Cantonese
- Yale Romanization: sàhn pàaih
- Jyutping: san4 paai4
Southern Min
- Hokkien POJ: sîn-pâi

Third alternative Chinese name
- Chinese: 牌套
- Literal meaning: tablet set
Transcriptions
Eastern Min
- Fuzhou BUC: pai-tau

Vietnamese name
- Vietnamese alphabet: Bài vị / Linh vị / Thần chủ
- Chữ Hán: 牌位 / 靈位 / 神主

Korean name
- Hangul: 위패 신위
- Hanja: 位牌 神位
Transcriptions
- Revised Romanization: wipae sinwi
- McCune–Reischauer: wipae sinwi

Japanese name
- Kanji: 位牌
- Kana: いはい
Transcriptions
- Romanization: ihai

Ryukyuan name
- Ryukyuan: 位牌 (ifee / iifee)

Thai name
- Thai: ป้ายวิญญาณ (Pai Winyan) ป้ายบรรพบุรุษ (Pai Banphaburut) พระป้าย (Phra Pai)

Indonesian / Malay name
- Indonesian / Malay: Papan arwah Papan roh Papan nama leluhur

A spirit tablet, memorial tablet, or ancestral tablet is a placard that people used to designate the seat of a deity or past ancestor as well as to enclose it. The name of the deity or the past ancestor is usually inscribed onto the tablet. With origins in traditional Chinese culture, the spirit tablet is a common sight in many East Asian countries, where forms of ancestor veneration are practiced. Spirit tablets are traditional ritual objects commonly seen in temples, shrines, and household altars throughout mainland China and Taiwan.

== General usage ==
A spirit tablet is often used for deities or ancestors (either generally or specifically: e.g. for a specific relative or for one's entire family tree). Shrines are generally found in and around households (for household gods and ancestors), in temples for specific deities, or in ancestral shrines for the clan's founders and specific ancestors. In each place, there are specific locations for individual spirit tablets for ancestors or one or another particular deity. A spirit tablet acts as an effigy of a specific deity or ancestor. When used, incense sticks or joss sticks are usually burned before the tablet in some kind of brazier or incense holder. Sometimes fruit, tea, pastries, or other offertory items are placed near the tablet to offer food to that particular spirit or divinity.

In Chinese folk religion a household will have one or more tablets for specific deities and family ancestors:

- One near the front door, and at or around eye level, dedicated to the Jade Emperor. Generally, but not always, this tablet will be above the tablet dedicated to Tudigong. This tablet reads 天官赐福; 天官賜福.
- Some houses will have a tablet at or near the gate which reads 门官福神; 門官福神 "this tablet is dedicated to the Door Gods".
- One outside the house at the front door on the ground, dedicated to Tudigong, an Earth Deity. This tablet usually reads simplified Chinese: 门口土地财神; traditional Chinese: 門口土地財神 (less commonly 门口土地福神; 門口土地福神).
- One in the kitchen, dedicated to Zao Jun, the kitchen god.
- One which is dedicated to the dizhu shen. This tablet comes in several forms: the simple form which reads 地主神位, or a longer, more complex form which comprises two couplets commonly reading 前後地财神，五方五土龙神; 前后地主財神，五方五土龍神.
- Two in the house, usually at least one in the living room. These tablets will usually be put in a cabinet, similar to a Japanese butsudan household shrine, and they will be usually for a family's ancestors and some other deity which may or may not be represented by a spirit tablet.

The ancestral tablet is viewed as representing the ancestor or containing the ancestor's soul.

In their most simple form the spirit tablets can simply be a piece of red paper with the words written vertically (in mainland China and in Hong Kong). More complex forms exist; these could be full, small shrines made of tile, wood, metal or other material; statues and attendants with text; small posters with incense places; and so on. A common form of the tablet for Tudigong (as seen in Guangdong, China), for example, consists of a baked tile which has the core text of the tablet 門口土地財神, flanked by two additional couplets reading 户纳千祥， 门迎百福; 戶納千祥， 門迎百福) meaning something close to "May my household welcome a great deal of auspiciousness, may my doors welcome hundreds of blessings".

In Taoism, spirit tablets are often used for ancestors. Sometimes spirit tablets are found before or below statues of deities, which represent the enclosed spirit of the deity.

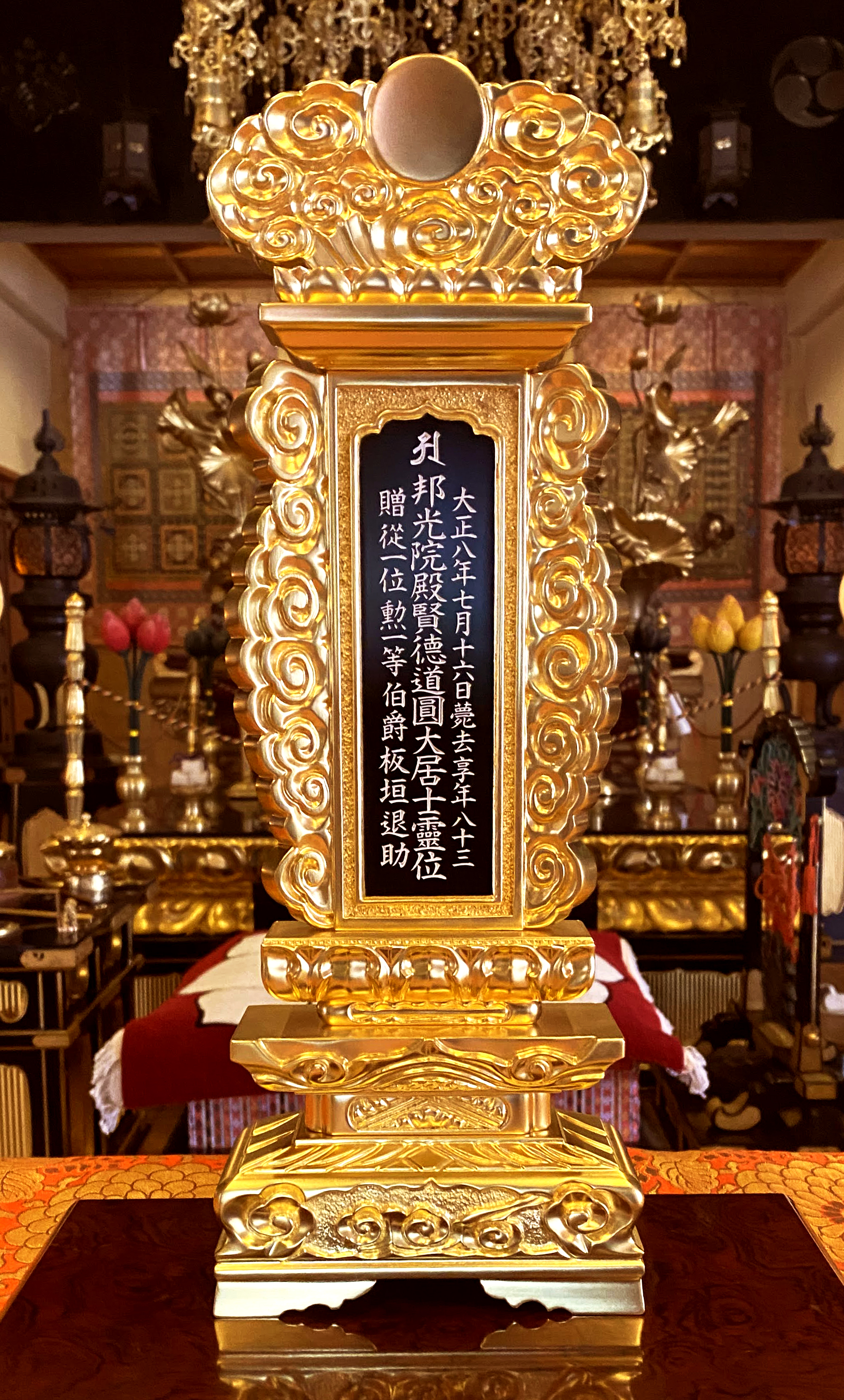
Buddhist memorial tablet of Itagaki Taisuke (front side)

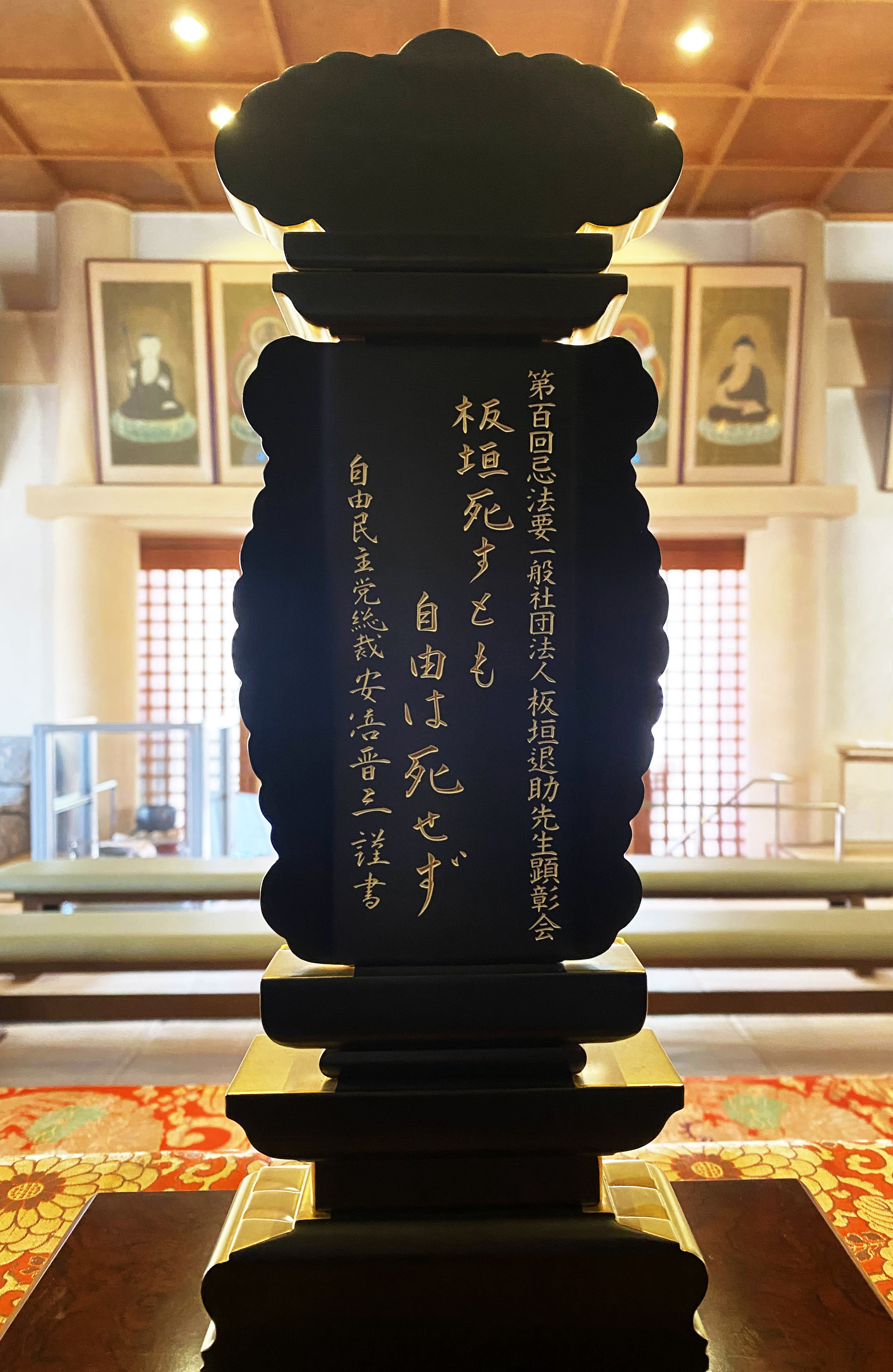
Buddhist memorial tablet of Itagaki Taisuke (back side) "Itagaki may die, but liberty never!"

In Chinese Buddhism, spirit tablets, known as “lotus seats” (蓮位) for the dead and “prosperity seats” (祿位) for the living, are used in the same manner for ancestors, wandering spirits, demons, hungry ghosts, and the living (for the perpetual or temporary blessing of the donor). Temporary tablets in the form of paper are common around the time of Qingming and Ullambana dharma festivals, which are incinerated en masse at the culmination of these services.

In Japanese Buddhism, tablets are used in funeral rites and stored in the home butsudan. Tablets are also common in Japanese temples.

In Korean culture, spirit tablets are of great importance in ancestral rites called jesa, as they are the centerpieces of food offerings and represent the spiritual presence of the deceased.

== Gallery ==
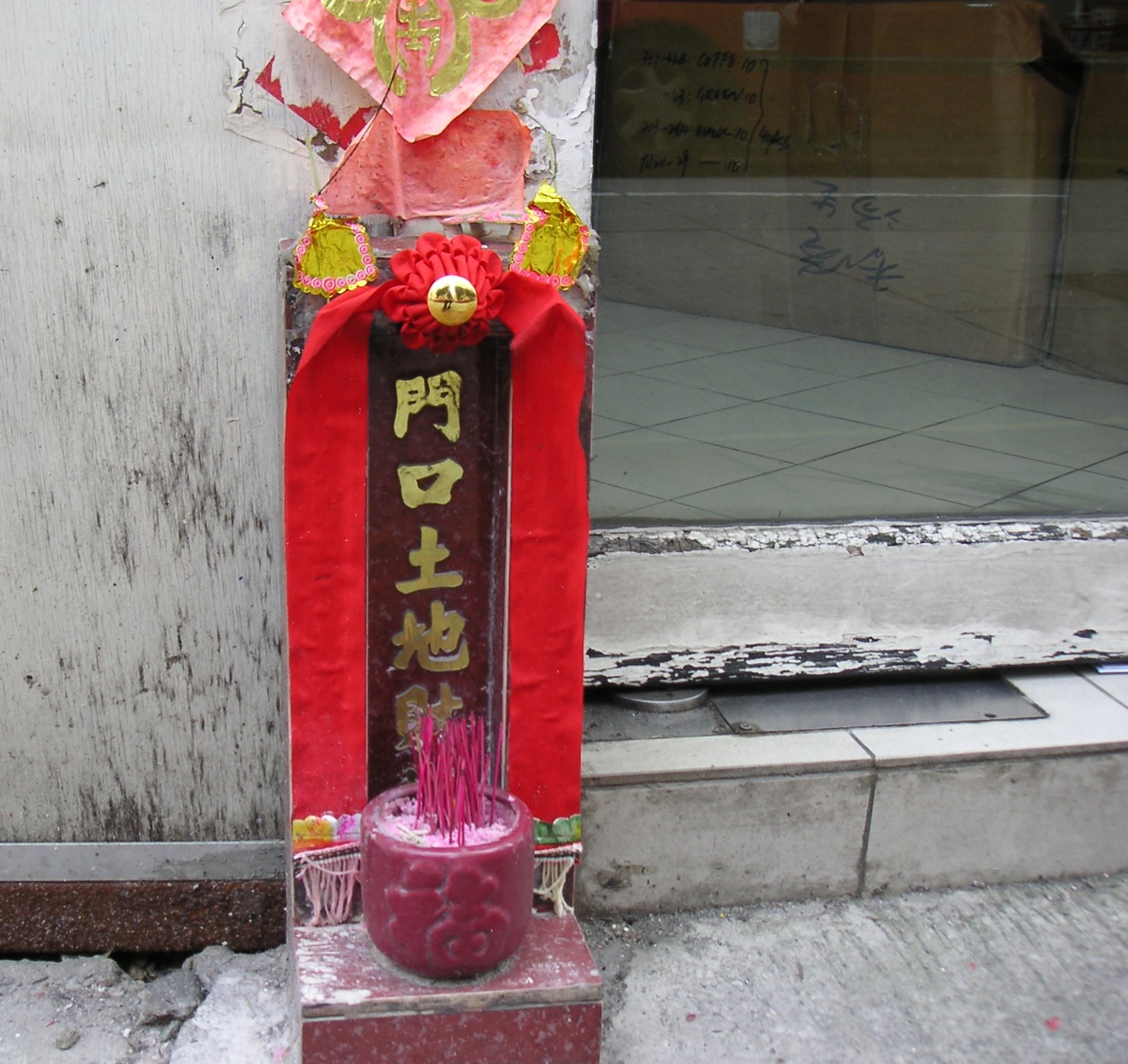
A doorway spirit tablet dedicated to Tudigong in Hong Kong.

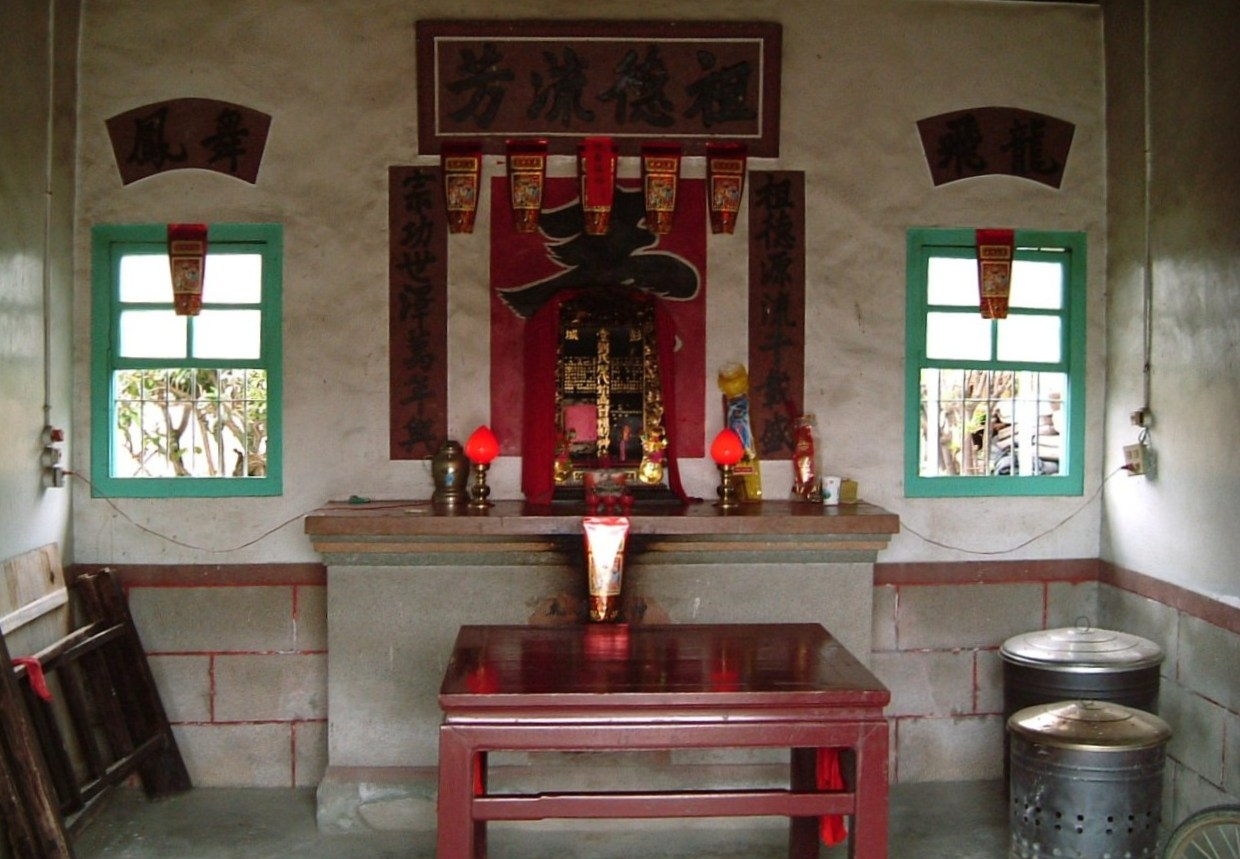
Tablet in Taiwan

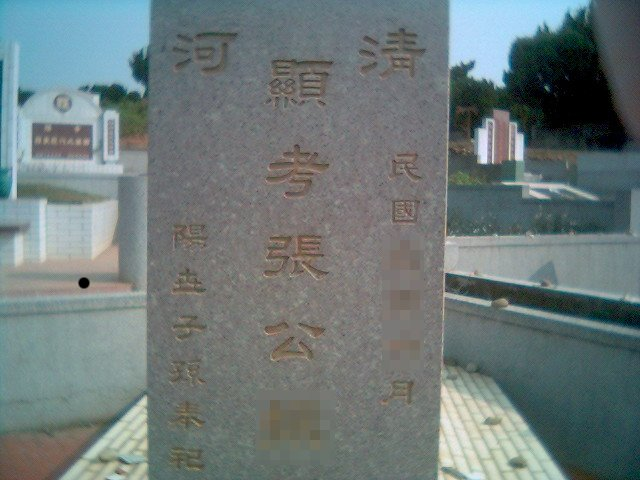
A stone tablet of a tombstone
(Name has been blurred for protection)

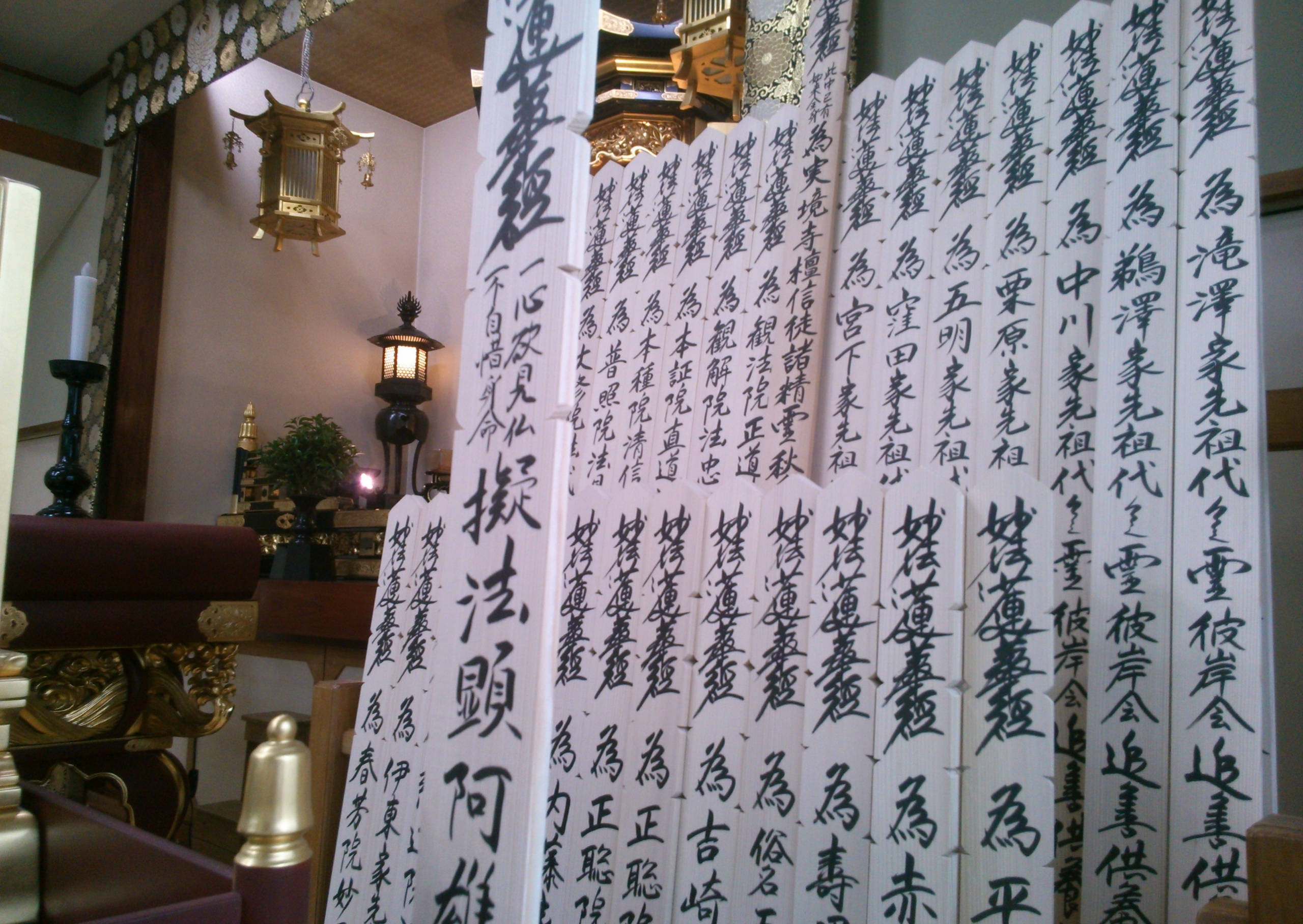
Memorial tablets used in Nichiren Shoshu Buddhism

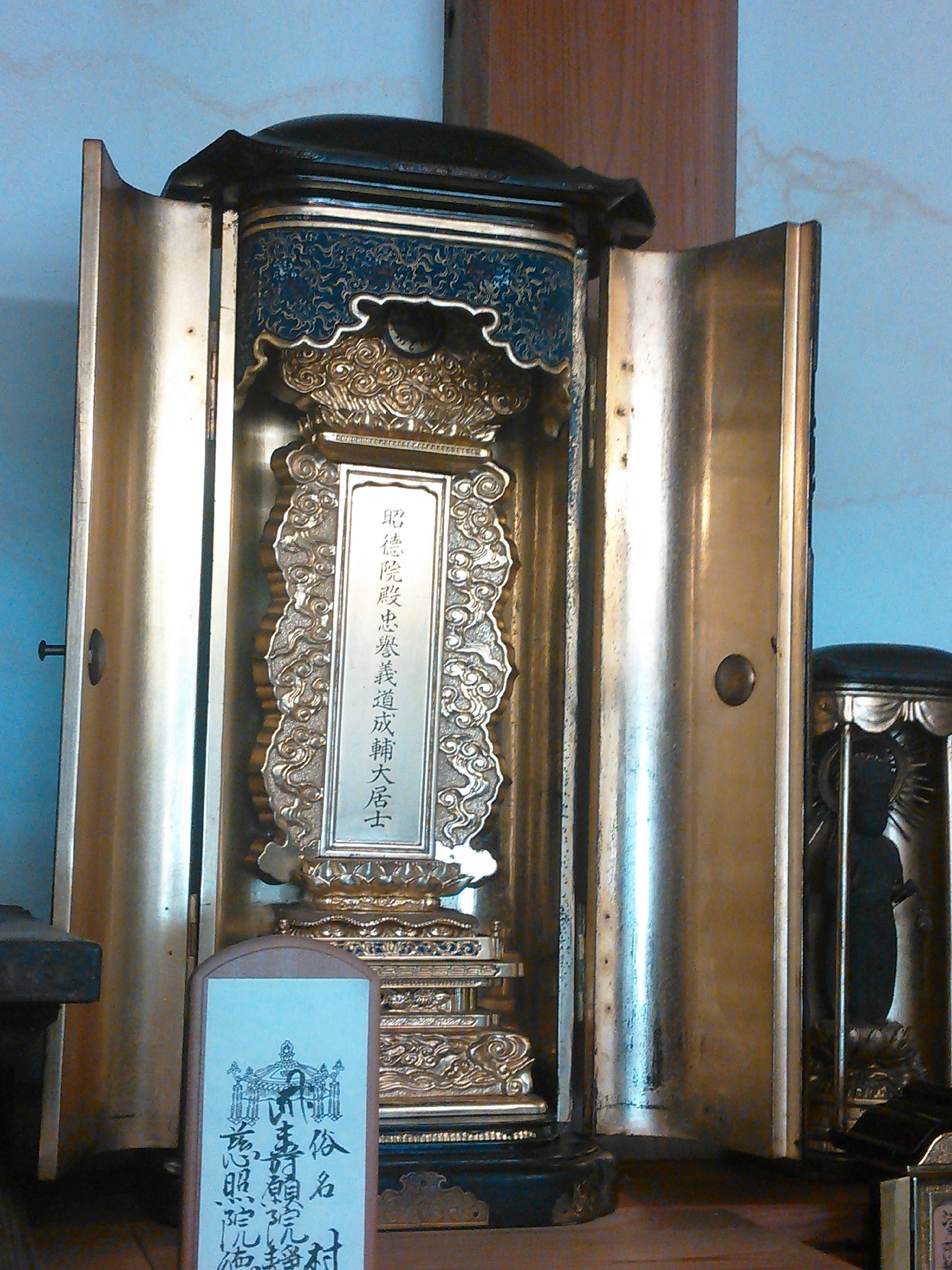
A Japanese spirit tablet in a Butsudan

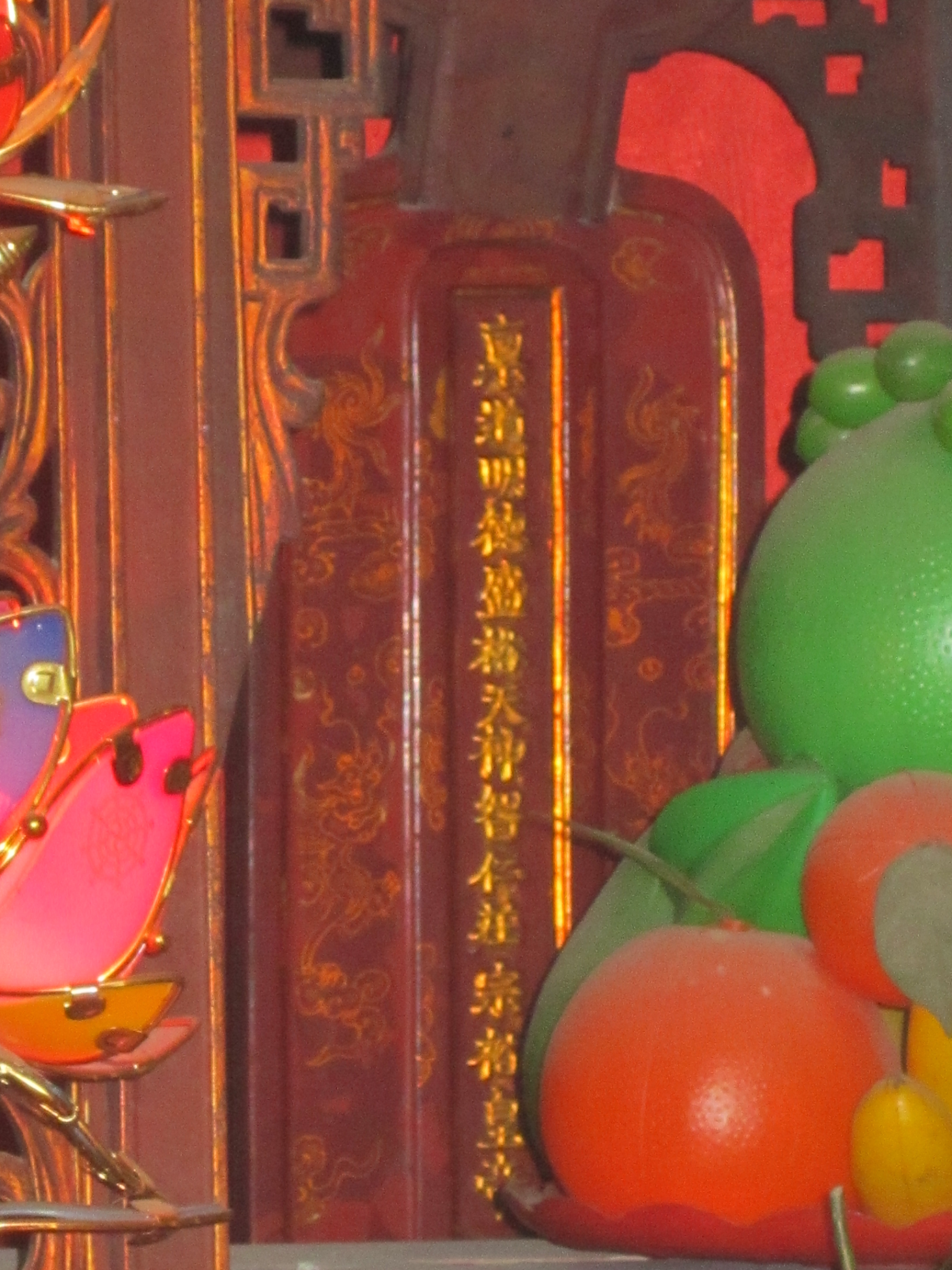
A Vietnamese spirit tablet dedicated to emperor Lê Trang Tông

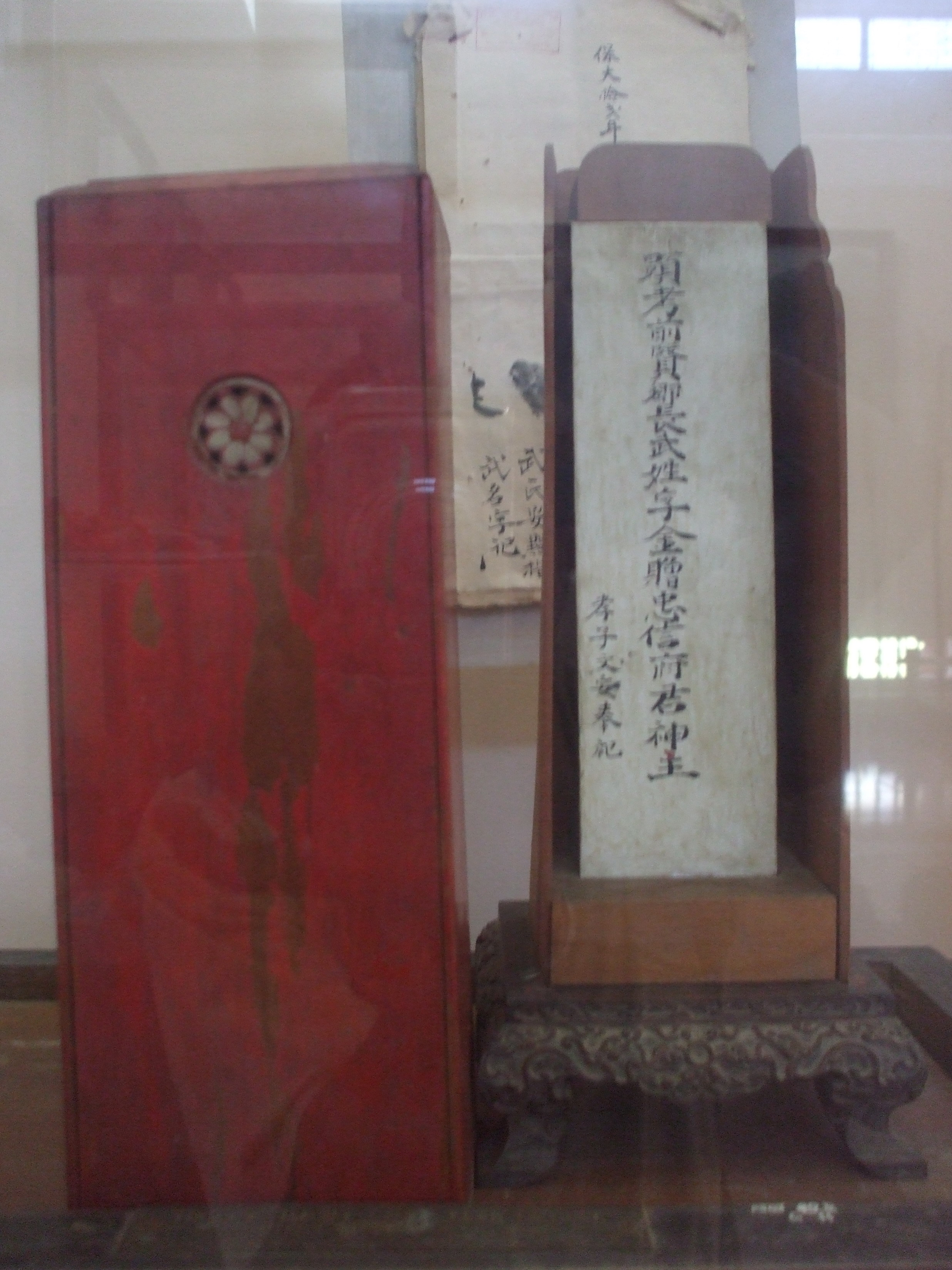
A Vietnamese spirit tablet dedicated to Võ Văn Dũng

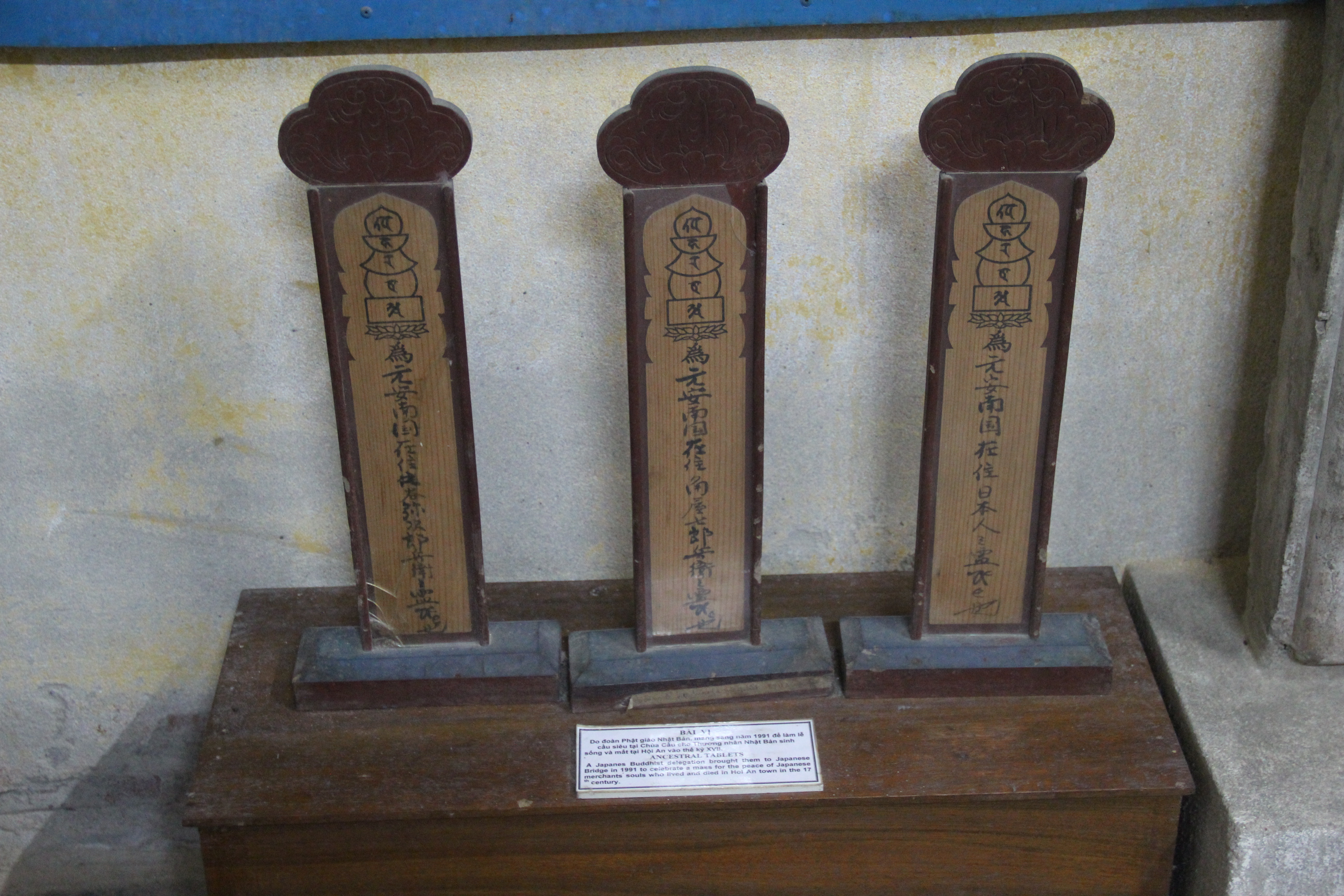
A Japanese sotoba tablet dedicated to ancestors in Hoian, Vietnam

== See also ==
- Ancestor veneration in China
- Ancestor worship
- Ancestral shrine
- Butsudan
- Chinese lineage associations and Kongsi
- Chinese kinship
- Shigandang
- Ullambana
- Zhizha and Religious goods store
- Zhong Yuan Festival
- Zupu and Chinese kin
