= Taoism in Singapore =

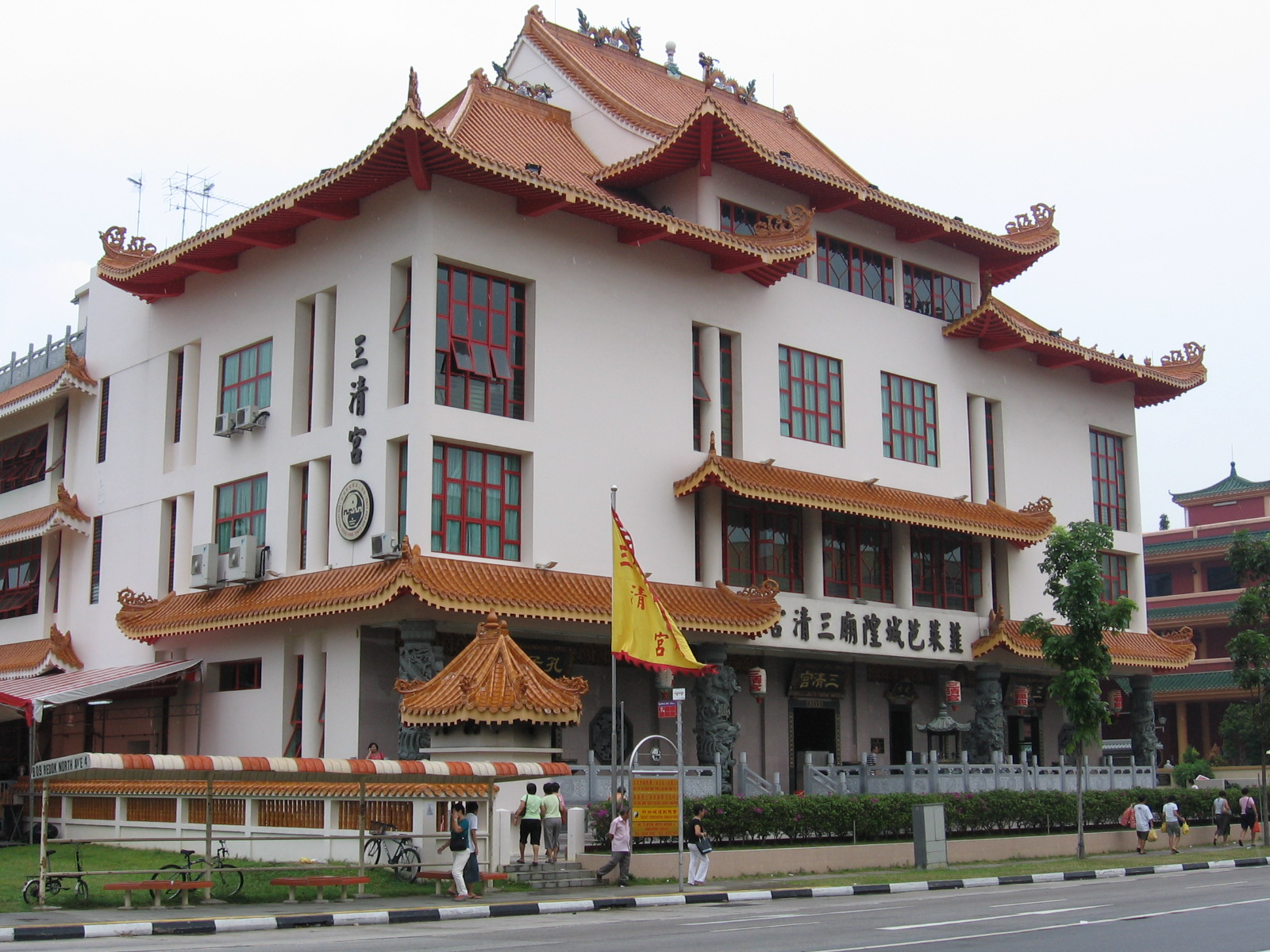
- San Qing Gong Temple in Singapore, dedicated to Three Pure Ones

Total population
- 303,960 (2020 census); 8.8% of the Singaporean population

Regions with significant populations
- Singapore

Languages
- Chinese

Taoism in Singapore is the religion of about 8.8% of the country's resident (Note: In Singapore, the term "resident" refers to both citizens and permanent residents (PRs).) population as per the 2020 census. The definition of "Taoism" in the country is included as part of the wider Chinese folk religion. Larger proportion of older residents adhere to Taoism, as compared with those in younger age groups.

The Taoist Federation of Singapore was first established in 1990 to promote greater public awareness and understanding of the Taoist culture and traditions. Although there are over one thousand Chinese temples in Singapore, only around 540 Taoist temples and organisations are affiliated to the Taoist Federation.

== History ==
Taoism first arrived in Singapore with the first Chinese settlers to the country. The majority of these settlers worshipped Mazu (媽祖) to guide them safely in on their arrival in a new foreign country. Taoist practice later flourished as an increasing number of Chinese merchants and coolies settled in Singapore.

Many Taoist followers worship bodhisattva as well since Taoism and Buddhism have traditionally enjoyed a peaceful coexistence, thereby leading to obscured delineation between the two religions. Subsequently, with the rise of Buddhist activists in the 1980s, the pool of faithful who worship both Taoist deities and Buddha realigned to declare themselves as Buddhists even if they were primarily worshipping Taoist deities (defined as families which worship Taoist deities at home). This led to a statistical decline in the Taoist population in Singapore. However, any attempt to deny Taoism its right as a religion of its own is dubious owing to the substantially growing and unreported numbers of youth embracing the faith.

1980–2020 statistics for major religions and philosophies by the Singapore Census
Religion	1980		1990		2000		2010		2020	
Religion	Num.	%	Num.	%	Num.	%	Num.	%	Num.	%
Taoism		30.0%		22.4%	212,344	8.5%	339,149	10.9%	303,960	8.8%
No religion		13.1%		14.3%	370,094	14.8%	527,553	17.0%	692,528	20.0%
Other religions		56.9%		63.3%	1,912,192	76.7%	2,239,046	72.1%	2,462,605	71.2%
Population		100%		100%	2,494,630	100%	3,105,748	100%	3,459,093	100%

== Role of Taoism in the Chinese community ==
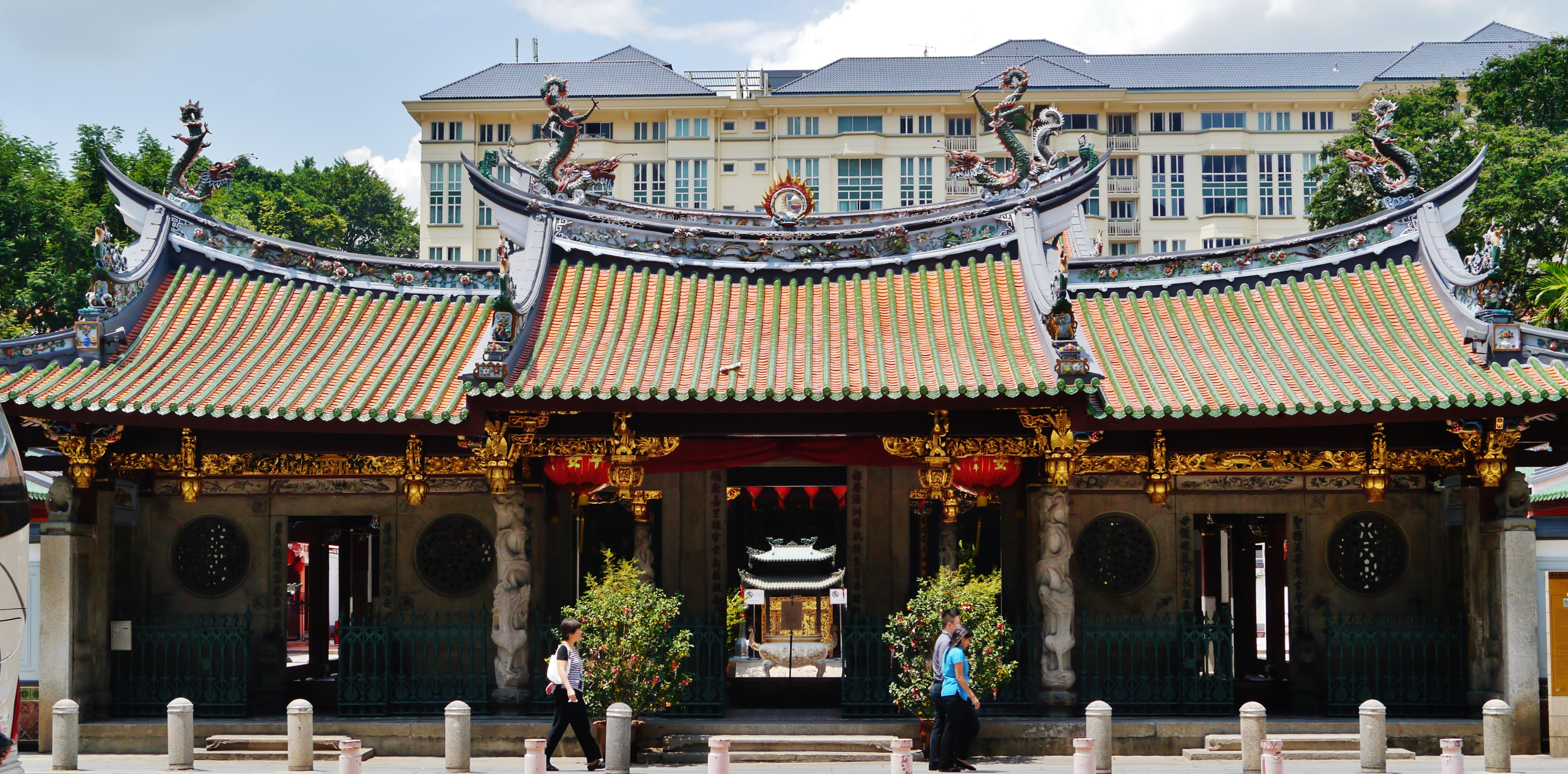
Thian Hock Keng is one of the oldest Taoist temples in Singapore.

Taoism itself forms part of the nucleus of Chinese traditions amongst Chinese Singaporeans, many folk practices are also adopted by some of the Chinese Buddhists. Chinese Deities like Lord Guan, Xuan Tian Shangdi, and Tua Pek Kong are some of the most popular deities among Taoist adherents and the local Chinese community. Many Taoists also worshipped Buddhist Bodhisattvas like Guanyin and Di Zang Wang. The yin and yang, Wuxing concept, being an orthodox Taoist principle, is, however, only anecdotally practiced by the common Taoist believers.

Taoist martial arts, notably tai chi, is commonly practiced in community centres. Lorong Koo Chye Sheng Hong Temple, or the City God Temple, engaged Taoist priests from Mount Wudang to teach tai chi and had more than 3000 students of diverse race and religion practice daily at the temple.

One of the oldest Taoist temples is the Thian Hock Keng, built by the late wealthy philanthropist Kapitan Tan Tock Seng, which also serves as the origin of the Hokkien Huay Kuan. There are other century-old notables temples such as the Soon Thian Keing Temple in Geylang, Hong San See Temple in River Valley and the Kwan Im Thong Hood Cho Temple in Waterloo Street. Most of these notable temples are usually more inclined to three religions than purely Taoist temples.

== Ancestor worship ==
Chinese ancestral worship is a traditional practice, practiced by a large number of ethnic Chinese in Singapore. The Taoists, most Buddhists and some of the non-religious Chinese still continued the ancestral worship tradition.

In the past, Chinese families enshrined ancestral tablets with the ancestors' names inscribed on them. Such tablets are placed on ancestral halls and urns meant for placing joss sticks, and food offerings are usually placed in front of it. Ancestral tablets found in Chinese homes only state the names of patrilineal ancestors and their wives. With the advent of modernism, and perchance owing to the decline of traditional Chinese values, filial piety and thus such practices are slowly fading. However, many Chinese have eventually moved their ancestor tablets to Buddhist temples and a handful of Taoist temples to carry on the ancestor worship tradition in much simplified manner. At most only Taoist or Buddhist altars are found in Chinese homes.

Families may choose to have their ancestors cremated and kept in columbariums or buried in cemeteries respectively. Families would visit their ancestor's resting place, especially during the Qingming Festival. They would bring joss sticks, incense papers and food offerings to the ancestors.

According to Chinese custom and tradition, people worshipping ancestors at Chinese cemeteries or columbariums must first lay out their offerings and prayer items before burning the joss stick. The worshippers may then recite prayers before proceeding to place their joss sticks on designated areas. The worshippers then burn the incense paper and collect the food after worship.

=== Incense paper ===
Incense paper used for ancestor worship comes in several forms; each represents a present for the ancestor's spirit. Paper coloured yellow with a gold foil printed on it represents a gold tael; that with a silver foil represents a silver tael.

Another variant is single-coloured paper which is manufactured with a rougher surface on one side and a smoother surface on the other side. Such paper come in varying colours. Incense paper of this type is to be rolled up and snugged tightly at both ends. The smoother face should form the exterior surface. Incense paper of this variant is used to represent clothes for the ancestor. Paper with a soft and rough surface printed in brown recycled paper serves as cloth.

Hell notes of various sizes as well as kai chin are used to represent money. All of this incense paper is arranged and collected into a bundle known as yi bou in accordance to significance. The brown incense paper serves as the base. Usually, the base must have an even number of "cloth" papers, and one sheet will serve as the nucleus of the base. They are followed on by the bank notes, kai chin, clothes and taels, and the yi bou is gathered up, and burnt with a candle before throwing it into the urn. Joss papers manufactured into the shape of shirts and trousers are sometimes burnt together with the yi bou.

=== Funeral customs ===
Taoist funerals in Singapore differ from ethnic group to ethnic group. Most of the Taoist temples engaged to conduct funeral rituals are based in Singapore with the exception of Hakka people where the undertaker engaged the priests from Kulai in Malaysia to come to Singapore to serve the bereaved Hakka families. A pair of funeral lanterns are placed at each side of the altar where on one lantern listed down the deceased surname while the other listed his or her age. The Teochew tradition did not write the deceased surname on either lantern but two Chinese characters "严" or "慈" because of the proverb "严父慈母" which reflects the traditional role of parents in the upbringing of their children and these characters indicate that the deceased is a male and female respectively. In some cases, the lantern wordings are written in red which means that the deceased lived a long life at least 80 years of age. For the Cantonese and Hakkas, the priest would conduct the "Breaking of Hell" ritual as it was believed that the deceased would drop into Hell when he dies based on his past sins and rituals are conducted to save the deceased and lead the dead souls out of the netherworld and enter into reincarnation.

== See also ==
- Chinese folk religion in Southeast Asia
- Religious goods store
- Zhizha
- Zhengyi Taoism
- Na Tuk Kong
