= Hàng Mã Street =

Street in Hanoi, Vietnam

Coordinates: 21.0366°N 105.8477°E

Hàng Mã Street (phố Hàng Mã) is a street in Hanoi famous for selling toys, paper goods, and in particular paper votive offerings. The street has been selling paper goods for more than 500 years. The street carries some of the wares of religious goods stores.

== Votive offerings ==
In Vietnam votive offerings now include:

- all kinds of joss paper goods - cars, villas, mopeds, household electronics, paper iPads - to be burnt for the dead. (Chinese zhǐzhā zh:紙紮). Older more traditional items such as paper servants, horses have fallen out of use.
- "Hell bank notes" (vi:Tiền âm phủ, Chinese zhǐqián zh:纸钱) - imitation dollars, credit cards, or traditional "ghost money" found in Chinese communities.

During the period before Vietnam's reforms these offerings were suppressed.

The street also gives its name to đồ hàng mã, "Hàng Mã things," a generic name for paper votive offerings.
