= Mingchao =

Mingchao may refer to:

- Ming dynasty (明朝), an imperial dynasty of China
- Hell money (冥钞), a form of Chinese joss paper
- Wuthering Waves (鸣潮), a video game developed by Kuro Games
