= Zhizha =

Taoist paper art

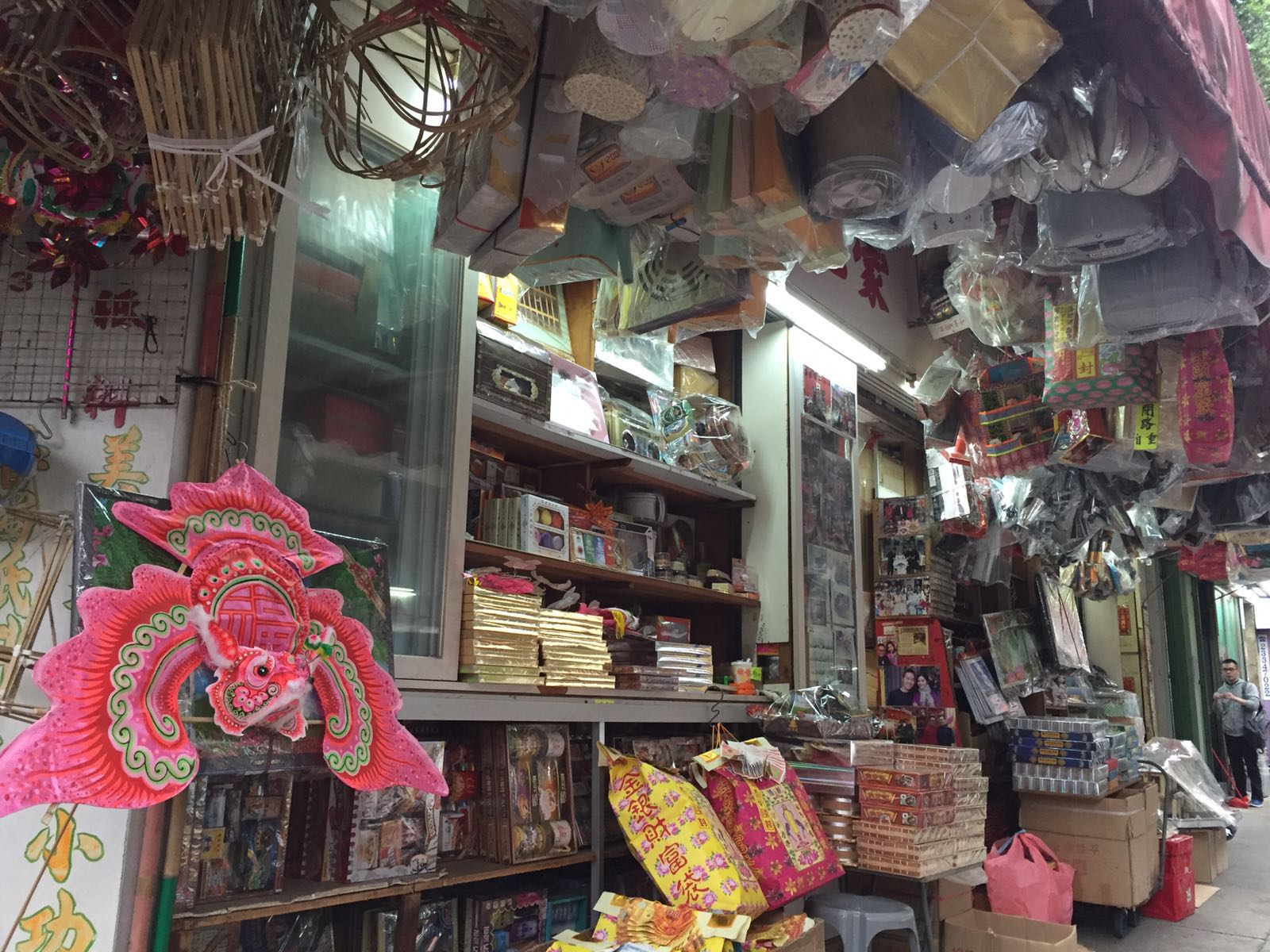
Zhizha shop

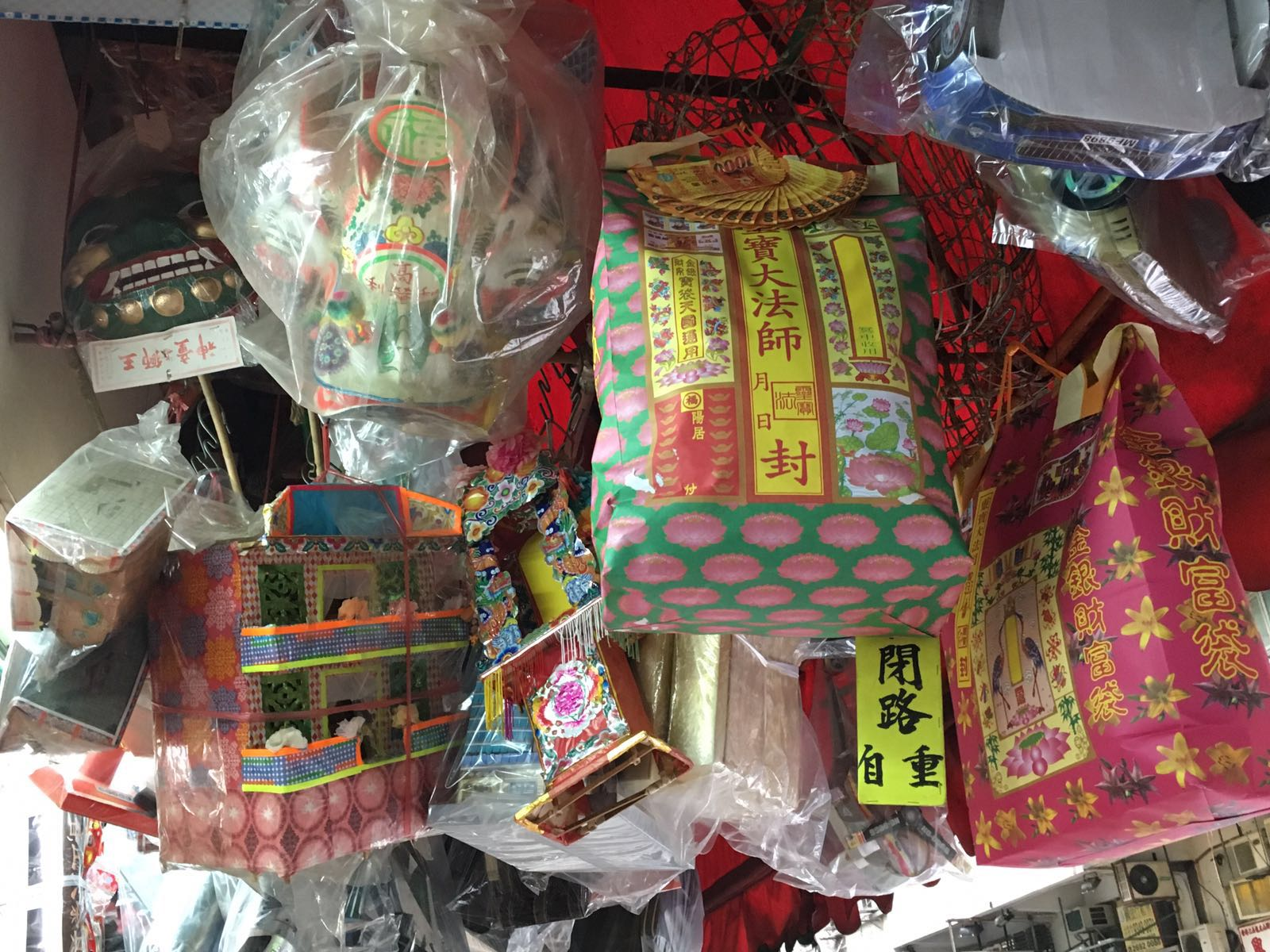
Product of zhizha

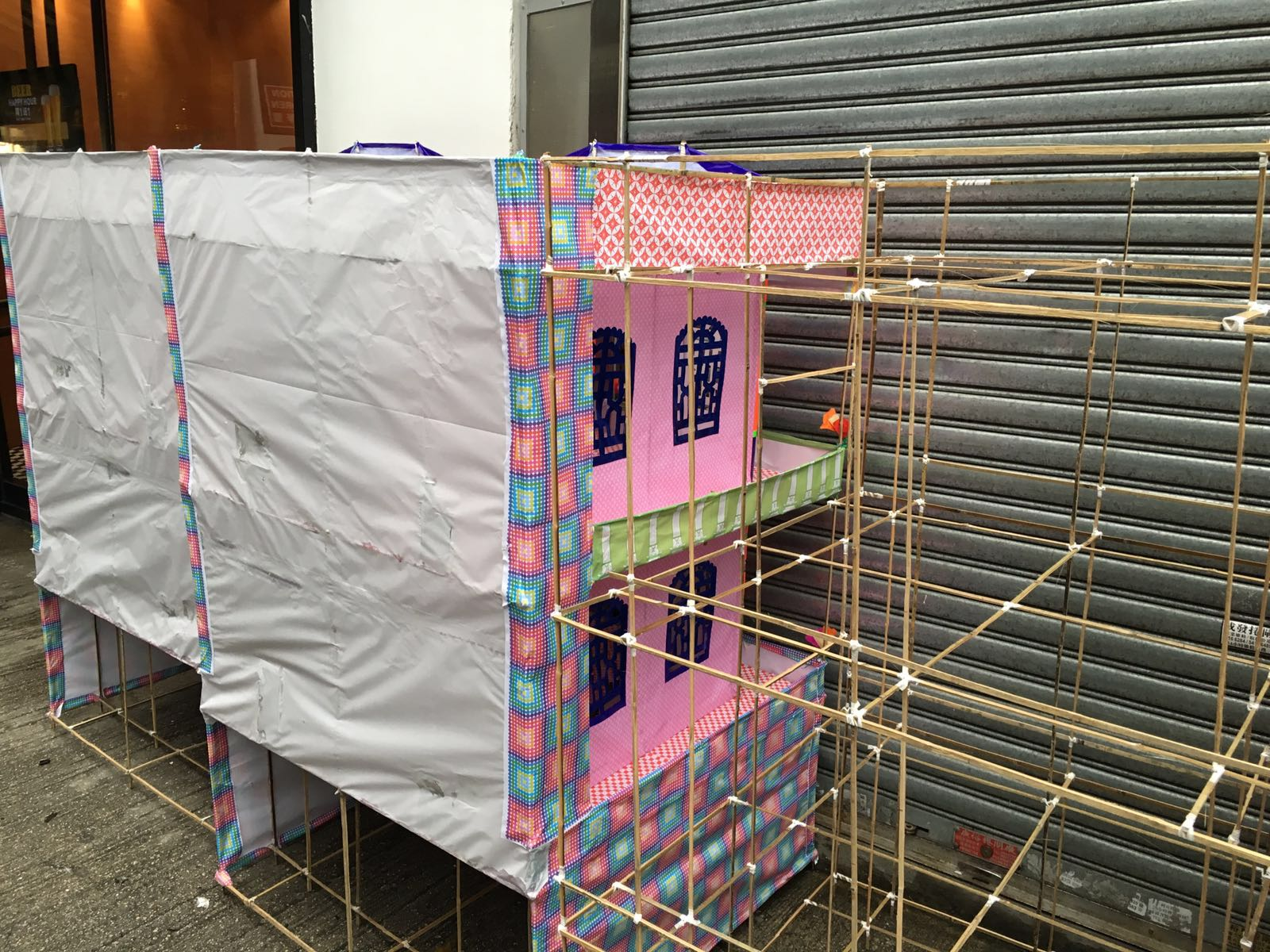
Internal structure of a zhizha house

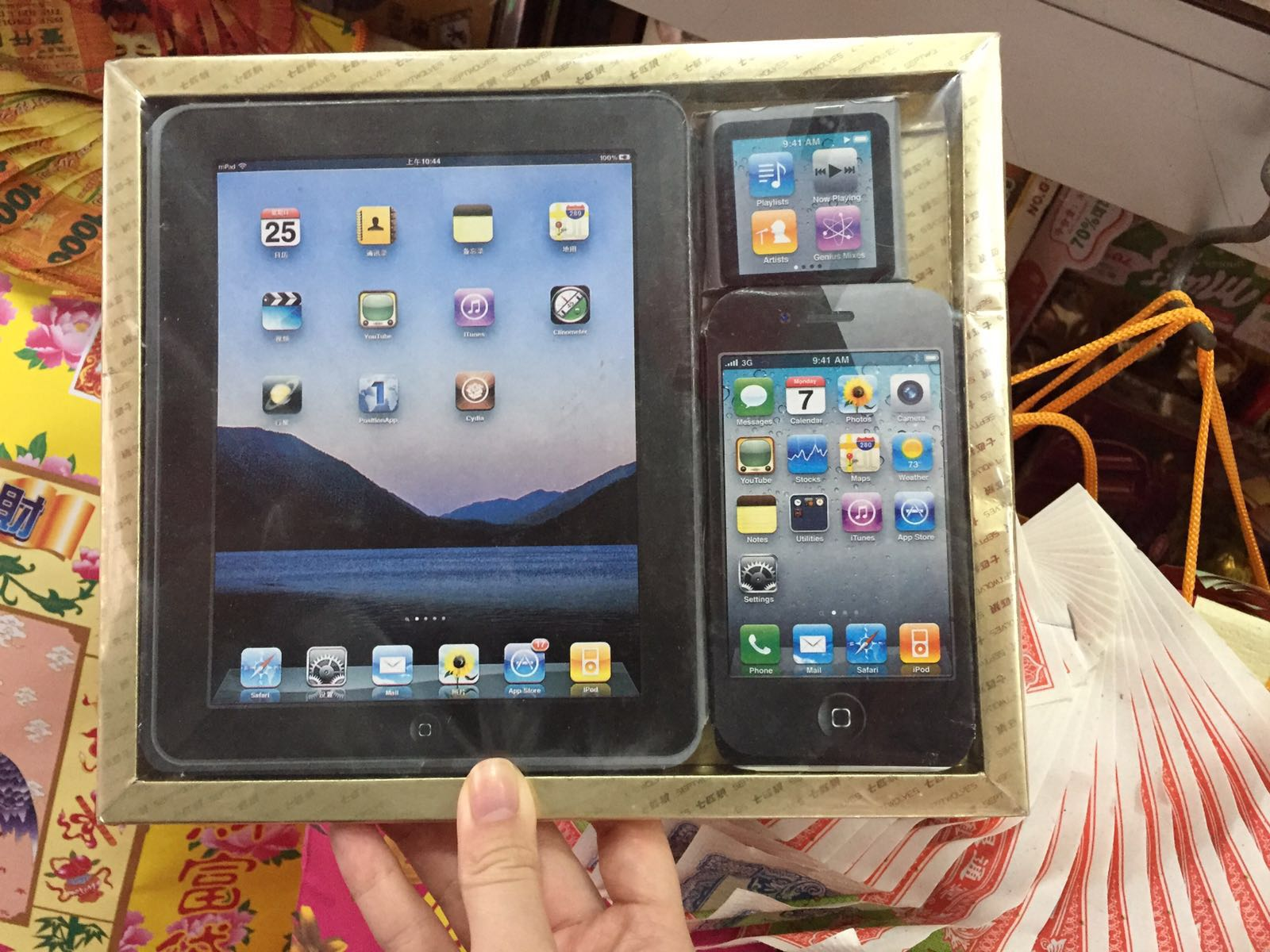
Innovative zhizha product

Zhizha (simplified Chinese: 纸扎; traditional Chinese: 紙紮; pinyin: zhǐzā), or Taoist paper art, is a type of traditional craft, mainly used as offerings in Taoist festive celebrations and funerals. It had become a widely accepted element in religious practice since Northern Song Dynasty. It has been reported to face a gradual loss of craftsmanship due to related environmental concerns and weakened religious belief.

== Origin ==
Zhizha is generally perceived as a form of offering in festive celebrations and funerals. It is believed to be a substitute for living offerings in a sacrifice.

Young women in ancient China were offered as brides every year to a so called "River God" in exchange for less frequent floods. To facilitate the exchange, the women would be sacrificed. This practice was later halted by Ximen Bao of Wei due to ethical concerns.

Zhizha is the present form of offerings. It only appeared after the maturation of papermaking skills in the Han dynasty. Its common usage came to reality in Northern Song Dynasty, when burning zhǐmǎ (paper dolls in the shape of animals) and zhǐyǒng (paper tomb figures) became popular. Effigies, which were often produced purposefully to resemble humans, took varied forms in different periods of time, from couch grass, terracotta, and eventually paper.

== Health impact ==
Burning of joss paper

Metal contents analysis of ash samples shows that joss paper burning emits a lot of toxic components causing health risks. There is a significant amount of heavy metals in the dust fume and bottom ash, e.g., aluminium, iron, manganese, copper, lead, zinc and cadmium. Another study found that burning gold and silver joss papers during festivals may contribute to Parkinson's disease among the elderly and slow child development.

== Usage ==
More contemporary or westernized varieties of Joss paper include paper currency, credit cards, cheques, as well as papier-mâché clothes, houses, cars, toiletries, electronics and servants (together known as Zhizha in Mandarin zhǐzhā zh:紙紮). The designs on paper items vary from the very simple to very elaborate (with custom artwork and names).

In 2006, in response to the burning of "messy sacrificial items", such as paper cars, houses, and pills, Dou Yupei, the PRC deputy minister for civil affairs, announced that the ministry intended to ban at least the more extreme forms of joss paper.

Zhizha art plays an important role in Chinese culture. Despite being one of the most important kinds of decorations in villages, it also serves as an important medium of communication between humans and gods in different forms.

The Zhizha art is mostly for festive or funeral decoration and offerings. During festivals which perform the Taoist ritual, "Dajiao", Zhizha is used to make symbolic decorations such as lanterns, the models of mythic creatures and Gods in parades. During Ghost Festival and Qingming Festival, apart from joss paper, people burn Zhizha offerings to worship gods and show respect to the ghosts of the deceased. While similarly, Zhizha is essential for a traditional Taoist funeral. Since the Chinese generally believe in an afterlife, anything needed for the deceased to enjoy their afterlives, such as houses, furniture, food, gadgets and even servants will be made into Zhizha models and burned as offerings to them.

=== Materials and structure ===
Bamboo and colored paper are used to prepare Zhizha. The manufacturing process of different offerings are similar, but for large and complex Zhizha, the production process is more time-consuming and more complicated.

Generally, to create a Zhiza, the first step is to draft the appearance on a graph. Then, the paper is cut and torn into the desired shape. A form for support made by bamboo is needed on which to glue the colored paper. It is possible to alter the shape of Zhizha to the desired form. Therefore, a large variety of Zhizha products such as apartment, mobile phones, laptops, vehicles, etc, can be made.

== Zhizha evolution ==
Comparing Zhizha in the past to modern Zhizha, there are differences in its types and production processes.

=== Types of product ===
In the past, the types of Zhizha is simpler, as Zhizha craftsmen made products that fulfilled basic human needs for clothing, food, shelter and transportation. Common types of Zhizha includes mansions, servants, paper money and sedan chair. People believe that burning these kinds of necessities to their ancestors can ensure them a better afterlife. However, there are various types of Zhizha like iPhones, iPads and also branded products like Prada.

=== Production method ===
In terms of the production process, most of Zhizha in the past was hand-made, and the production cost was generally high. More recently, Zhizha work has shifted to factories in China for mass production so as to lower the cost. "Though most people can buy paper-made offerings in local stores, a quick look at taobao.com, the most popular online shopping mall in China, reveals a wide choice of paper-made items from mini-houses, Mercedes Benz cars, passports and LV suitcases to iPads and iPhones."

Zhizha therefore evolves with the era.

== Craftsmanship ==
The craftsmen who produced Zhizha are usually recognised as zhācǎi jiàng (扎彩匠 in Chinese). Skills are passed down to the disciples from "sifus" ("masters").

Since Zhizha is Taoism-based, a Taoist priest can be a Zhizha craftsman. They learn the craftsmanship while handling their priestly duties simultaneously. The production of paper crafts is considered as an inferior duty, thus they are often assigned to the young priests.

As revealed by Chan and Bok, Zhizha, as a kind of traditional craft, is declining at present. One of the contributing factors is the low entry rate of new craftsmen into the industry. The growing disbelief in the afterlife, and increased awareness of the pollutive nature of burning Zhizha offerings are believed the main reasons behind the decline.

== See also ==
- Chinese folk religion
- Chinese ancestral worship
- Ancestral shrine
- Ancestral tablet
- Joss paper
- Religious goods store
- Papier-mache offering shops in Hong Kong
