= Religious goods store =

Stores specializing in the supply of religious material

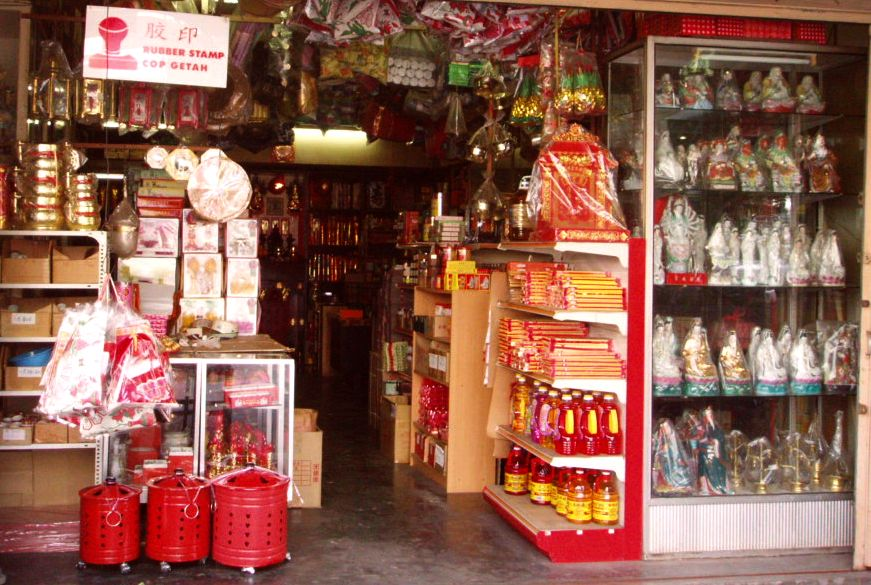
- Malaysian Chinese religious goods shop

Chinese name
- Chinese: 神料商店
- Literal meaning: god/spirit material shop/store
Transcriptions
Standard Mandarin
- Hanyu Pinyin: Shénliào Shāngdiàn
Yue: Cantonese
- Yale Romanization: san1 liu2 seung1 dim3
- Jyutping: san1 liu2 soeng1 dim3

Malay name
- Malay: Kedai Alat-alat Sembahyang (prayer instrument store)

A religious goods store, also known as a religious bookstore, religious gifts store or religious supplies shop, is a store specializing in supplying materials used in the practice of a particular religious tradition, such as Buddhism, Taoism, Chinese folk religion, Christianity and Islam among other religions.

These shops are abundant across the Greater Chinese region as well as Overseas Chinese communities around the world.

In Iran, religious goods stores are usually visited to buy the Quran, Al Mafatih-Al Jinan, goods like the tasbīḥ, and many other things. One of the services related to this is to add a page to Mafatih al-Jinan book for a deceased loved one.

In Christendom, religious goods stores are often visited to purchase Christian art, books and devotional material for the home, as well as gifts such as Bibles, Ichthys emblems, daily devotionals or cross necklaces for occasions such as baptism, confirmation and marriage.

== Items for sale ==
=== Buddhism ===
In Buddhist bookshops, a variety of Buddhist books and chanting CDs are usually available for sales. There is also wide range of other products which includes Buddha statues, Buddhist pendants, incense, candles, chanting beads, instruments, Buddhist monastics' robes, meditation cushions and other Buddhist accessories.

=== Christianity ===
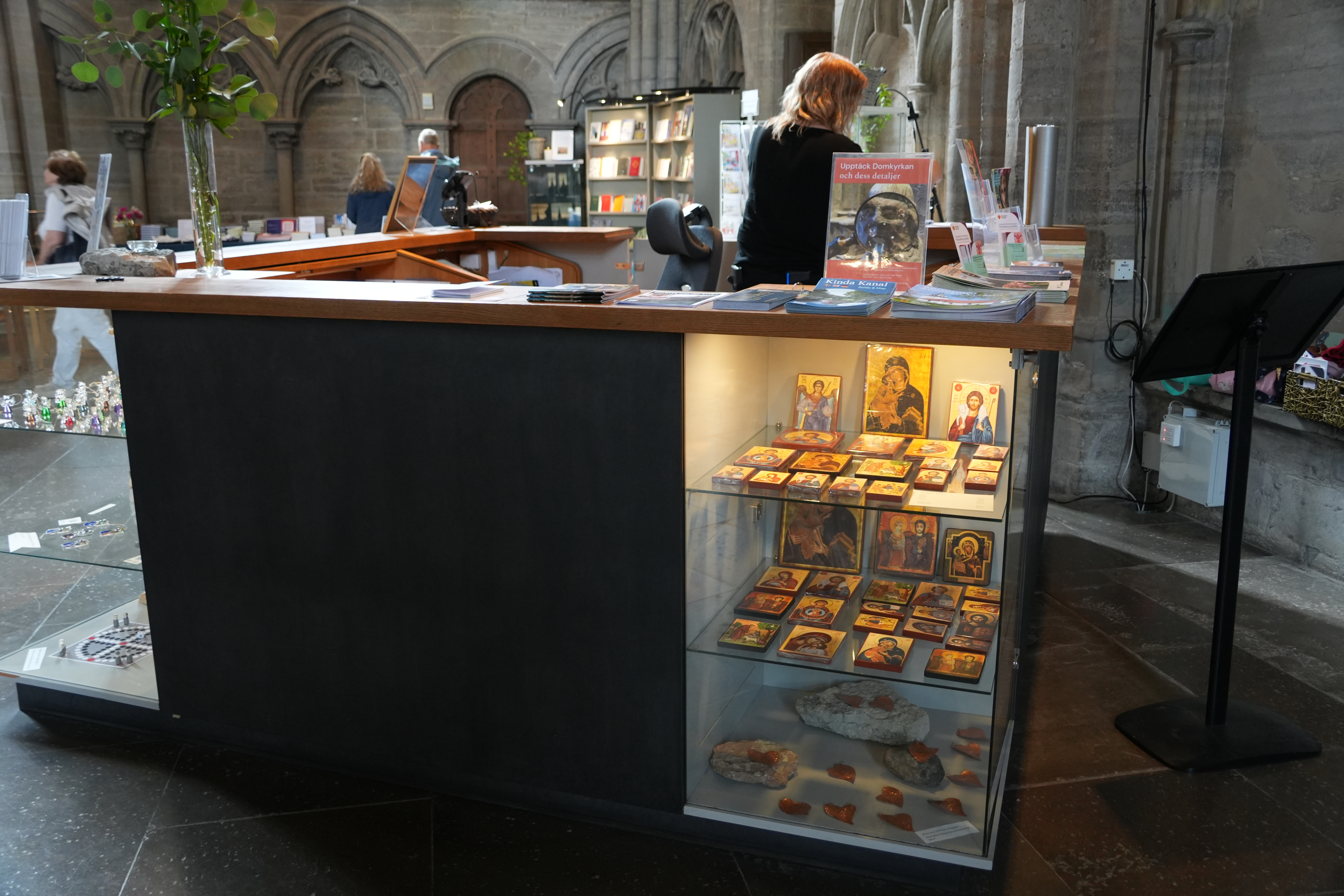
A religious goods store at Linköping Cathedral (Evangelical-Lutheran) in Sweden

In Christendom, "religious goods stores", also known as "Christian bookstores", have family Bibles, Christian art, daily devotional books, breviaries, catechisms, cross necklaces, Christian music albums, holy cards, home altars, prie-dieus, and prayer beads (such as the Dominican Rosary of Catholicism, the Wreath of Christ of Lutheranism, the Anglican rosary of Anglicanism, and the prayer rope of Eastern Orthodoxy), among other sacramentals such as Ichthys (Jesus fish) emblems for vehicles.

=== Chinese folk religion and Taoism ===
- Statues representing Chinese deities, also include bodhisattva images like Guanyin or Di Zang Wang
- Tong Sheng (通勝), Chinese divination guide and almanac
- all form of Chinese incenses, kemenyan and candles
- incense papers, underworld bank notes and various forms of paper offerings
- tablets dedicated to Tian Gong (天公), Tu Di Gong (土地公), Zao Jun (灶君) and ancestral tablets
- unconsecrated religious devotional objects like Pa-Kua, Qian Kun Tai Ji Tu and Shang Hai Zheng
- incense urns or incense holders
- Chinese teapots, tea cups and Chinese tea leaves
- incense paper burners
- incense sticks

== Gallery ==
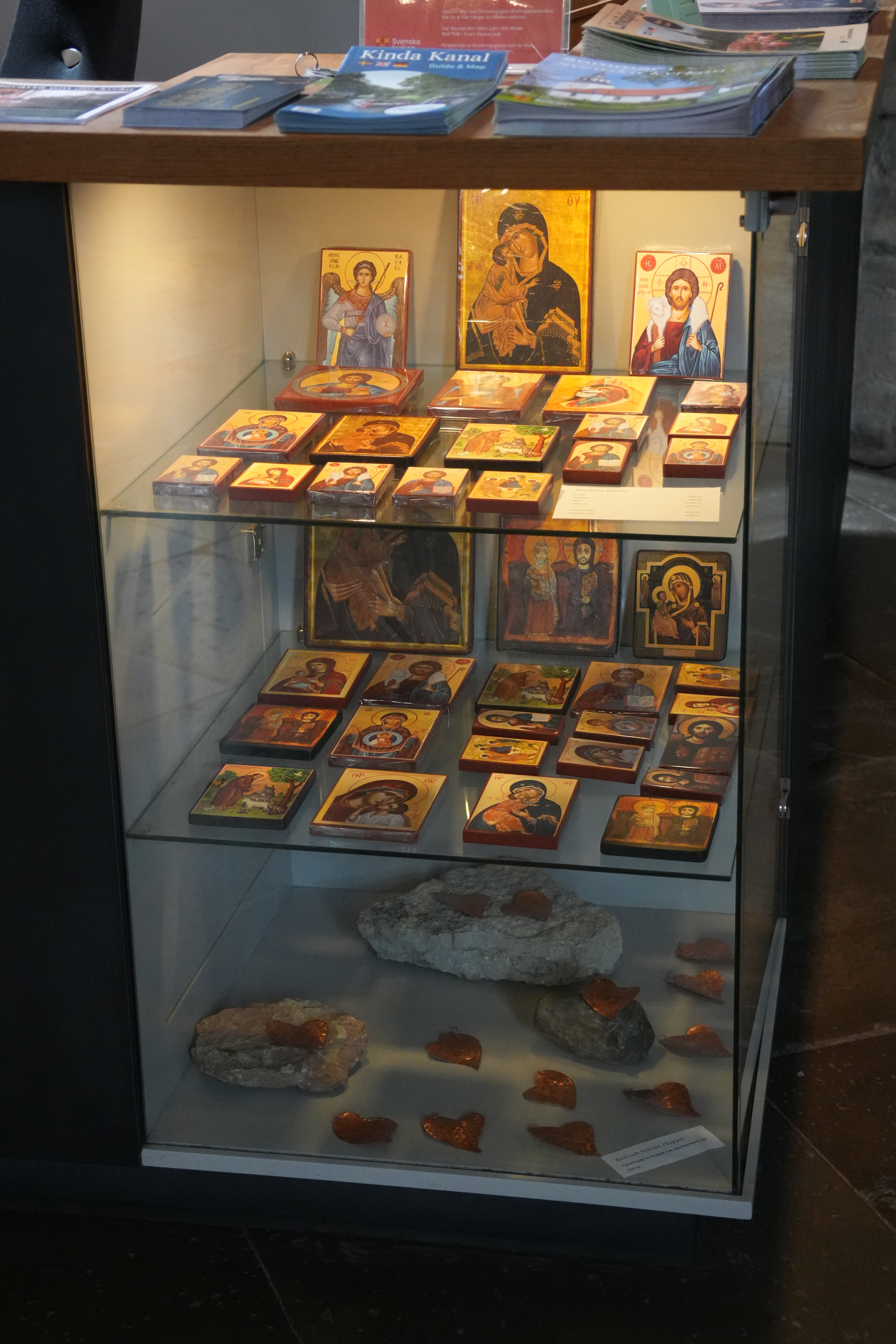
Icons at a Christian religious goods store in Linköping Cathedral (Evangelical-Lutheran) in Sweden

Malaysian Chinese and Indian Prayer Material Shop in Penang's Market Street (Little India district)

Statues of Maitreya on sale in a Prayer Material Shop in Penang

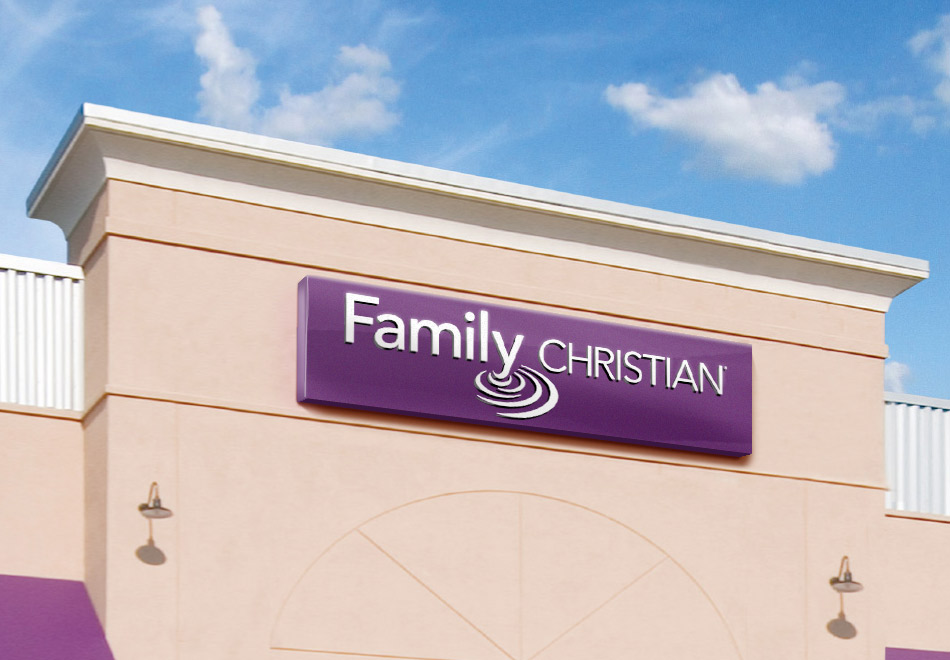
The exterior of a Family Christian religious goods store in the United States

== See also ==
- Chinese folk religion
- Chinese folk religion in Southeast Asia
- Chinese ancestral worship
- Ancestral hall & Ancestral tablets
- Joss paper
- Dajiao
- Zhizha
- Papier-mache offering shops in Hong Kong
