= Papier-mâché offering shops in Hong Kong =

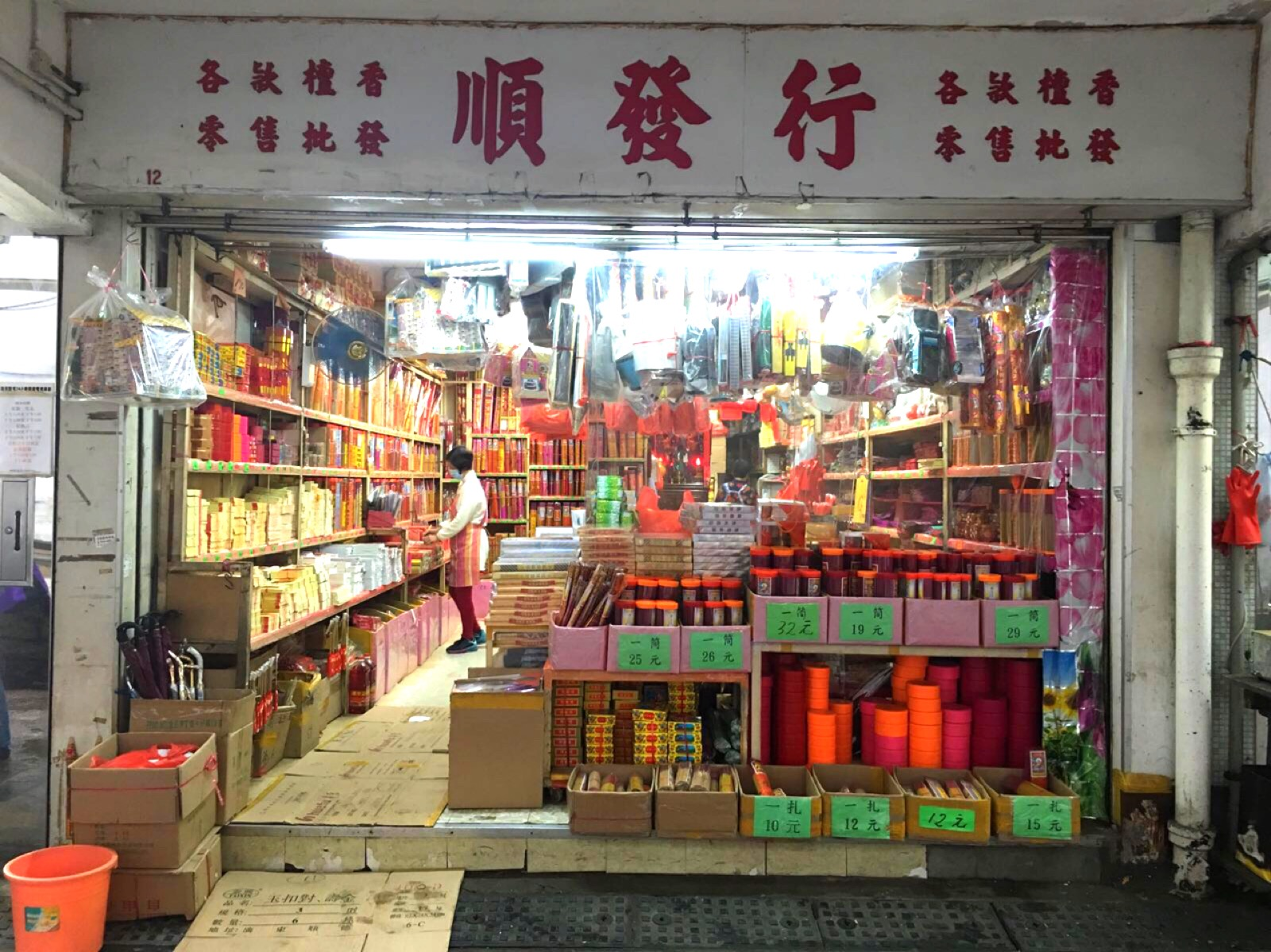
A papier-mâché shop in Tai Po, Hong Kong.

Traditional papier-mâché offering shops in Hong Kong sell papier-mâché offerings for sacred and festival-celebration purposes. Their popularity has grown since the 1940s. Since the start of the 21st century, demand for sacred papier products has declined, and thus papier-mâché shops and the entire industry is facing a reduction in sales.

== History ==
Papier-mâché offering shops started opening in Hong Kong from 1940. In 1940, there was a high demand for papier-mâché offerings, and the papier-mâché industry was prosperous. Shops were run by families and they manufactured and sold the papier-mâché products by themselves. In the 1950s, the Chinese Communist Party began to simplify funeral services through education, persuasion and step-by-step measures. Following the cultural revolution – which began in 1960 – the Communist Party destroyed many traditional practices and imposed simplism, simplifying traditional cultures and most of the traditional funeral rites were dissuaded on the mainland. This led to mainland papier-mâché shop owners flocking to Hong Kong to continue their business. After 1980, Hong Kong transformed into an international financial center, which promoted a knowledge-based economy, so people were no longer willing to work in papier-mâché sectors, which led to the gradual decline of the industry in Hong Kong. During the 21st century in Hong Kong, not only is the demand for papier-mâché products low, but over one-ninth of papier-mâché products are imported from mainland China. Local papier-mâché offering shops that produce their own stock for sale have become uncommon.

== Occasions and target customers ==
There are generally two types of papier-mâché products: papier-mâché for festival celebrations and for funeral use. Papier-mâché offering shops occasionally target their customers by providing various papier-products according to different festivals and occasions. The people who mostly want to consecrate their offerings are mainly Taoists, some Buddhists and those conducting ancestral worship.

== Festivals ==
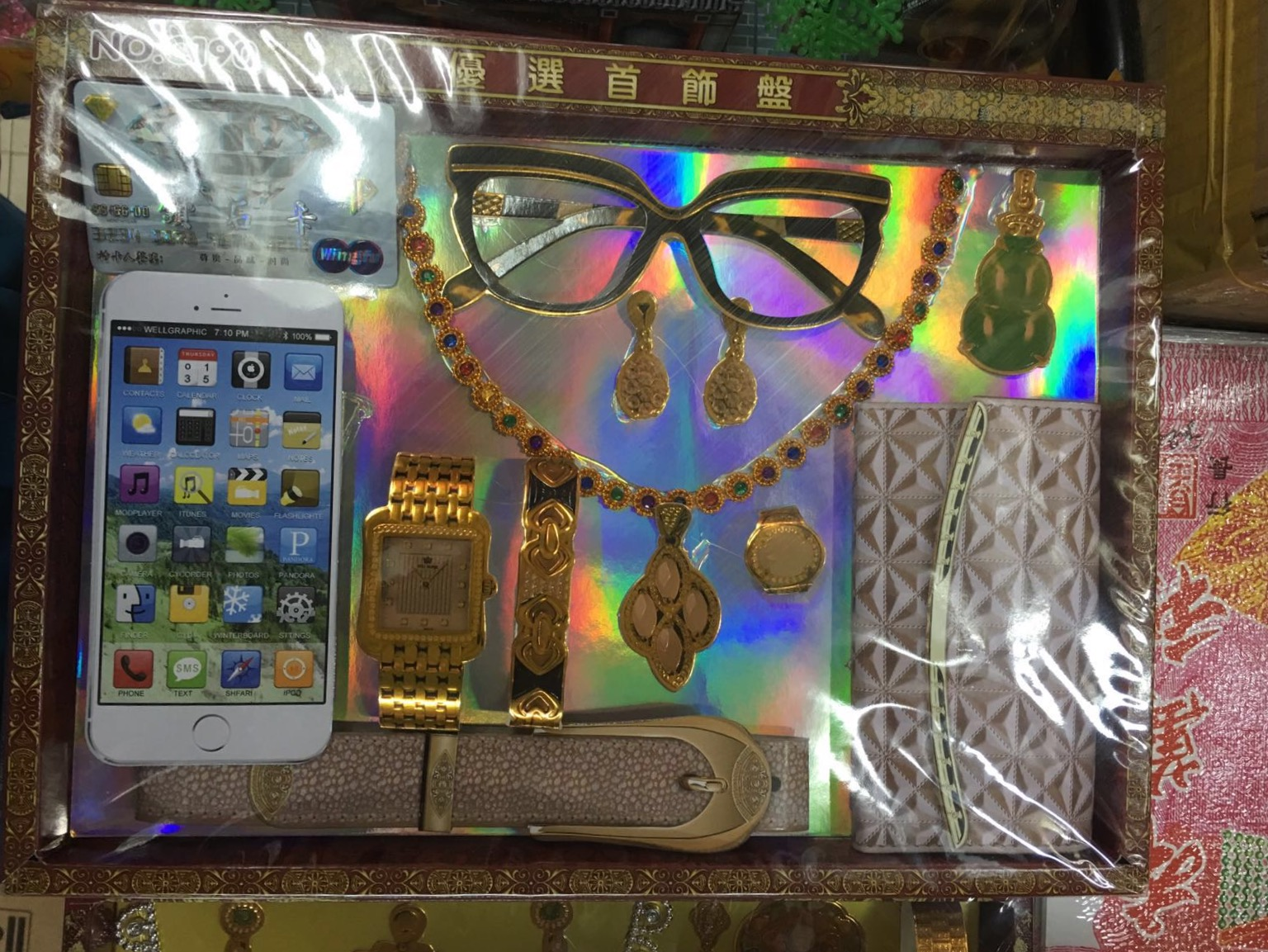
A set of female papier-mâché offerings included iPhone and accessories.

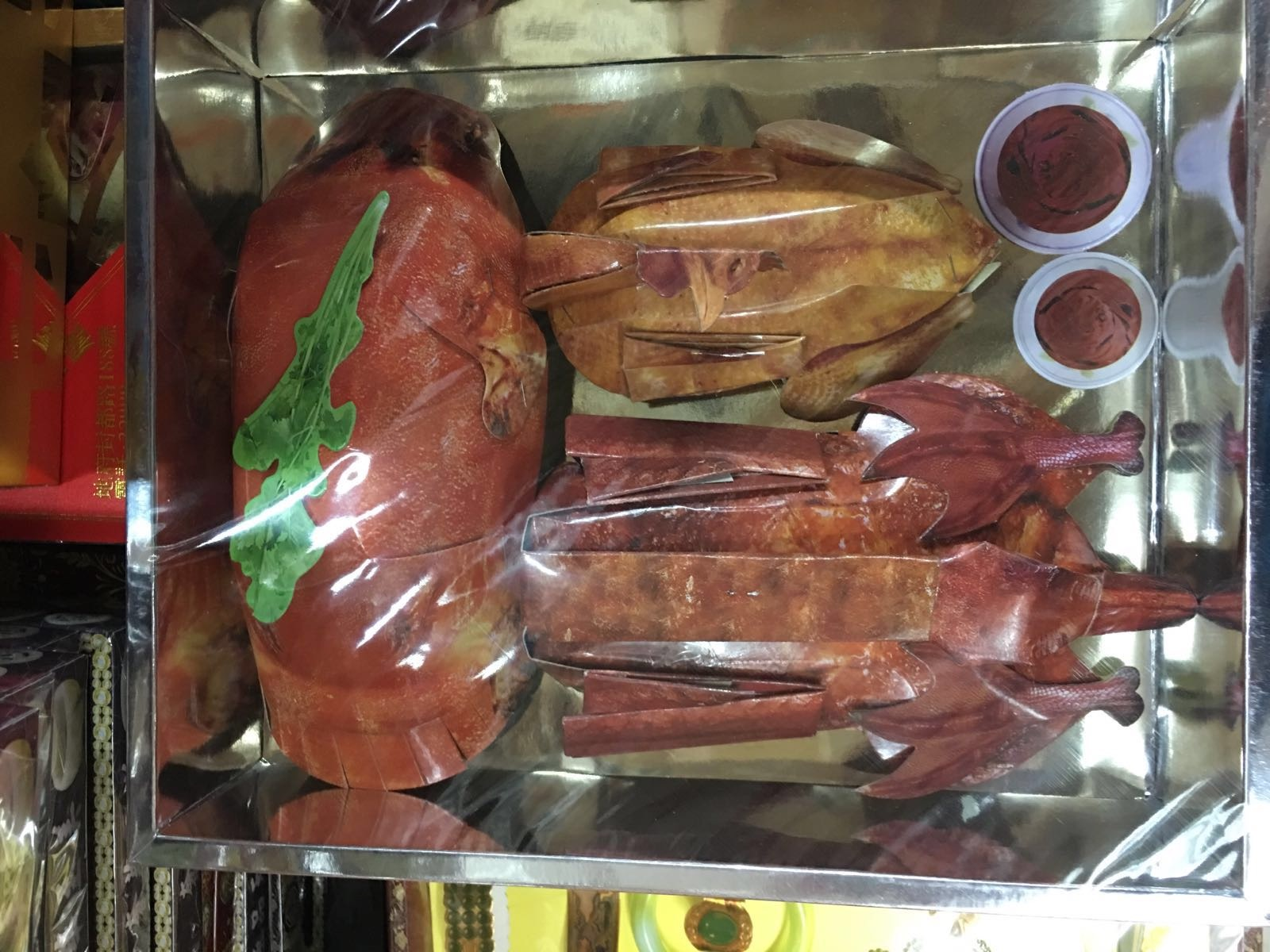
A papier-mache food set of 'Siu Mei' and roast suckling pig.

During Chinese New Year, shops provide paper money, joss sticks, Fai Chun and red candles for good luck inscriptions. Paper offerings are in demand at the Ghost Festival. Various offerings such as joss paper accessories, altar candles, papier-mâché forms of items (i.e. gold, clothes, bank notes), or other goods for the visiting spirits of ancestors, all have a strong footing in the paper offerings market. Traditionally, candles in wooden bowls are placed on street corners or along rivers to guide wandering spirits to the feasts prepared for them. Shops provide joss paper, accessory paper and incense, selling to the public to sacrifice their ancestors in Qingming Festival. In the Mid-Autumn Festival and Lantern Festival, shops sell candles and paper lanterns, which are used for the celebration. Many families buy such items for children in the Mid-Autumn Festival.

== Funerals ==
Chinese funerals (mainly Taoist funerals) are the occasions that require paper offerings most. Paper horses and paper goats are a must in the funeral ceremony. Those offerings, used for liberating souls from purgatory and fulfilling the needs of the souls in the underworld, consist paper currency, clothes, food, houses and transport methods. In the 21st century, products of paper offerings for funerals are nearly life-sized – for example, televisions, iPhones, or other electronics. This is an innovative mixture of a modern and ancient civilization. In this case, the target customers are people who conduct Taoist funerals.

== Famous papier-mâché shops in Hong Kong ==
The papier-mâché offering shops with a long history in Hong Kong are largely located in Queen's Road West and Queen’s Road Central. Bo Wah Paper Craft (寶華紮作) and Chau Zi Paper Craft (秋記紮作) are two well-known papier-mâché offering shops because of their long history.

=== Bo Wah Paper Craft (寶華紮作) ===
Bo Wah Paper Craft (寶華紮作) was established in 1963 and located in Sham Shui Po. The owner used to make traditional papier-mâché lion’s heads for Chinese New Year, but Au Yeung Bing Chi, the son of the owner, has changed the style of papier-mâché from traditional to modish in order to cater for modern society and to create a new trend. Papier-mâché can be customized in Bo Wah; for instance, creative papier-mâché products such as a stormtrooper from Star Wars and specific bones of the human skeleton are available in the shop.

=== Chau Zi Paper Craft (秋記紮作) ===
Chau Zi Paper Craft (秋記紮作), established in 1930 and located in Central, is one of the oldest papier-mâché shops in Hong Kong. The owner Chan Kui Chau is a well-known Hong Kong papier-mâché maker who makes traditional papier-mâché products such as the trotting horse lamp. Chau Zi attracts tourists from all over the world who come to visit, order and explore traditional Chinese papier-mâché products.

== Comparison between different papier-mâché offering shops around the world ==
Papier-mâché is a popular and common tradition across the whole of Asia. Besides China and Hong Kong, papier-mâché offering shops can be found in Japan, Vietnam and Chinese oversea communities in Southeast Asia with their unique cultures.

=== Japan ===
People have made papier-mâché by themselves since the Tang dynasty. Yet, due to economic development, people started to set up shops. Unlike in Hong Kong, the papier-mâché shops in Japan sell traditional paper products like orizuru (Japanese paper crane), omamori and Japanese traditional dolls for bowing and making wishes in the Shrines and Temples.

=== Vietnam ===
In Vietnam, the Hàng Mã Street located in Hanoi, has been selling paper goods for more than 500 years.

=== Western countries ===
Shops have been established in Western countries – such as the USA or the United Kingdom – by Chinese immigrants. For example, Mulberry Street in New York, also known as Chinatown, has papier-mâché retailers which are similar to those in Hong Kong. They serve the Chinese who are living there, in order to celebrate Chinese festivals.

== Interior design and architectural style ==
Papier-mâché shops in Hong Kong are usually designed in traditional Chinese style without fancy decoration. The layout seems to be disorganised but the goods are arranged in an orderly fashion. A large tablet is placed on top of the door with the name of the shop written in gold, yellow or red, around which there are some Chinese lanterns for decoration. Some shelves are put outside the shops for displaying products. For the setting, some simple closets are placed all around the shop with a variety of products on them. A glass case table forms a corner for the shop owner. Generally, there are tables placed in the middle of the shop, with a lot of packages of foss paper and papier-mâché placed on them for ancestral worship, which are sorted by plastic baskets or cartons. The 3D papier-mâché items are wrapped in plastic bags and hung inside the shop. During some traditional Chinese festivals, such as the mid-autumn festival, the festive products will also be wrapped in plastic bags and hung outside the shop to attract customers.
