= Joss paper =

Sheets of paper made into burnt offerings in Chinese culture

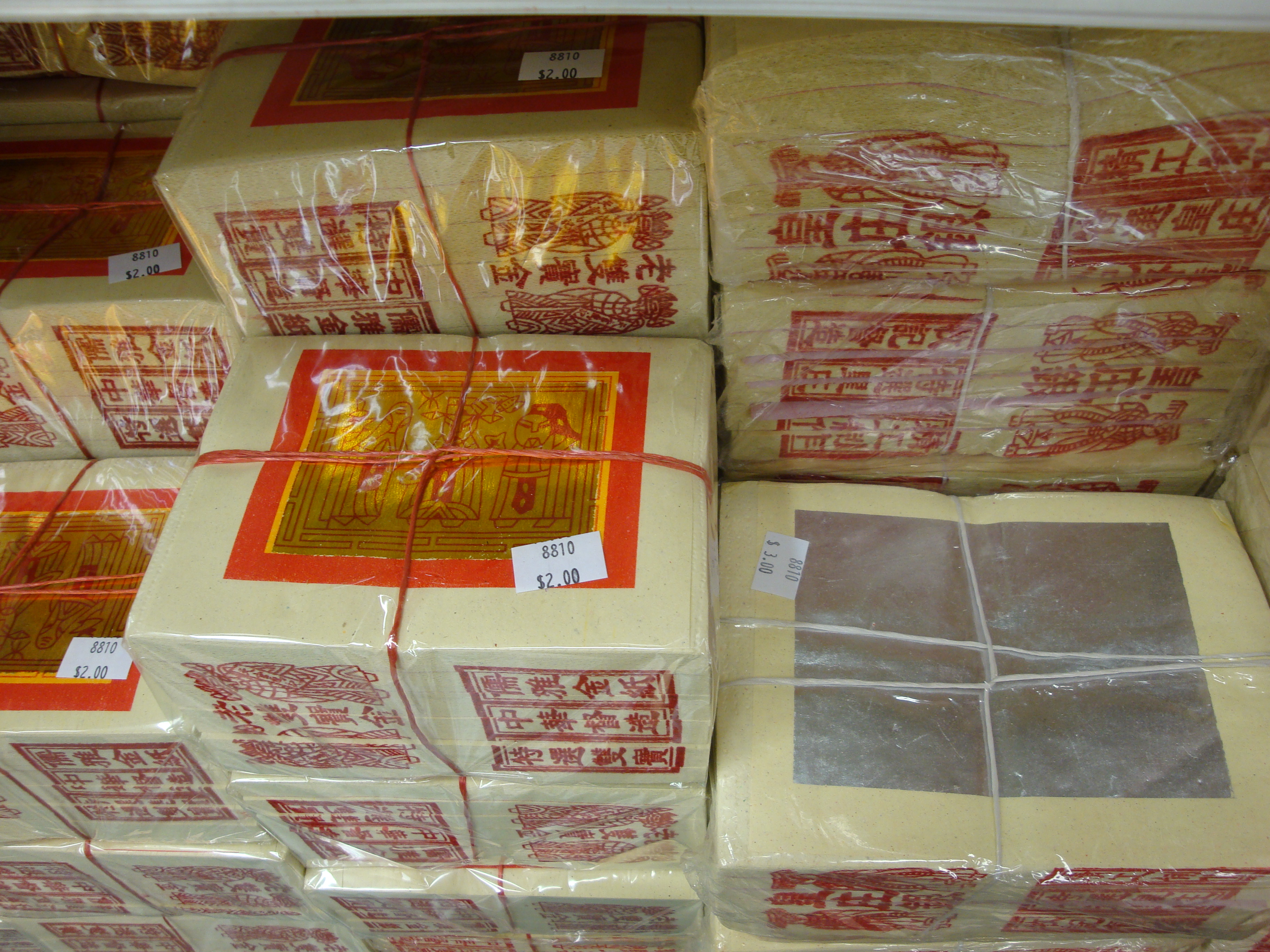
- Traditional joss paper (金紙) sold in stacks at a store

Chinese name
- Traditional Chinese: 金紙
- Simplified Chinese: 金纸
- Literal meaning: gold paper
Transcriptions
Standard Mandarin
- Hanyu Pinyin: jīnzhǐ

Alternative Chinese name
- Traditional Chinese: 陰司紙
- Simplified Chinese: 阴司纸
- Literal meaning: netherworld paper
Transcriptions
Standard Mandarin
- Hanyu Pinyin: yīnsīzhǐ
Yue: Cantonese
- Jyutping: jam1 si1 zi2

Second alternative Chinese name
- Traditional Chinese: 紙錢
- Simplified Chinese: 纸钱
- Literal meaning: paper money
Transcriptions
Standard Mandarin
- Hanyu Pinyin: zhǐqián
Yue: Cantonese
- Jyutping: zi2 cin4*2

Third alternative Chinese name
- Traditional Chinese: 冥幣
- Simplified Chinese: 冥币
- Literal meaning: shade/dark money
Transcriptions
Standard Mandarin
- Hanyu Pinyin: míng bì

Vietnamese name
- Vietnamese alphabet: tiền vàng mã tiền âm phủ đồ mã
- Hán-Nôm: 錢鐄𦄀 錢陰府 圖𦄀

Joss paper, also known as incense papers, are papercrafts or sheets of paper made into burnt offerings common in Chinese ancestral worship (such as the veneration of the deceased family members and relatives on holidays and special occasions). Worship of deities in Chinese folk religion and the Vietnamese Lên đồng ritual also uses a similar type of joss paper. Joss paper, as well as other papier-mâché items, are also burned or buried in various Asian funerals, "to ensure that the spirit of the deceased has sufficient means in the afterlife". In Taiwan alone, the annual revenue that temples received from burning joss paper was US$400 million (NT$13 billion) as of 2014.

The word "joss" is derived from the Latin deus (god) via the Portuguese deus through the Javanese dejos, through Chinese pidgin English..

== Use ==
Spirit money is most often used for venerating those departed but has also been known to be used for other purposes such as a gift from a groom's family to the bride's ancestors. Spirit money has been said to have been given for the purpose of enabling their deceased family members to have all they will need or want in the afterlife. It has also been noted that these offerings have been given as a bribe to Yanluo Wang to hold their ancestors for a shorter period of time.

Venerating the ancestors is based on the belief that the spirits of the dead continue to dwell in the natural world and have the power to influence the fortune and fate of the living. The goal of ancestor worship is to ensure the ancestor's continued well-being and positive disposition towards the living and sometimes to ask for special favours or assistance. Rituals of ancestor worship most commonly consist of offerings to the deceased to provide for their welfare in the afterlife which is envisioned to be similar to the earthly life. The burning of spirit money enables the ancestor to purchase luxuries and necessities needed for a comfortable afterlife.

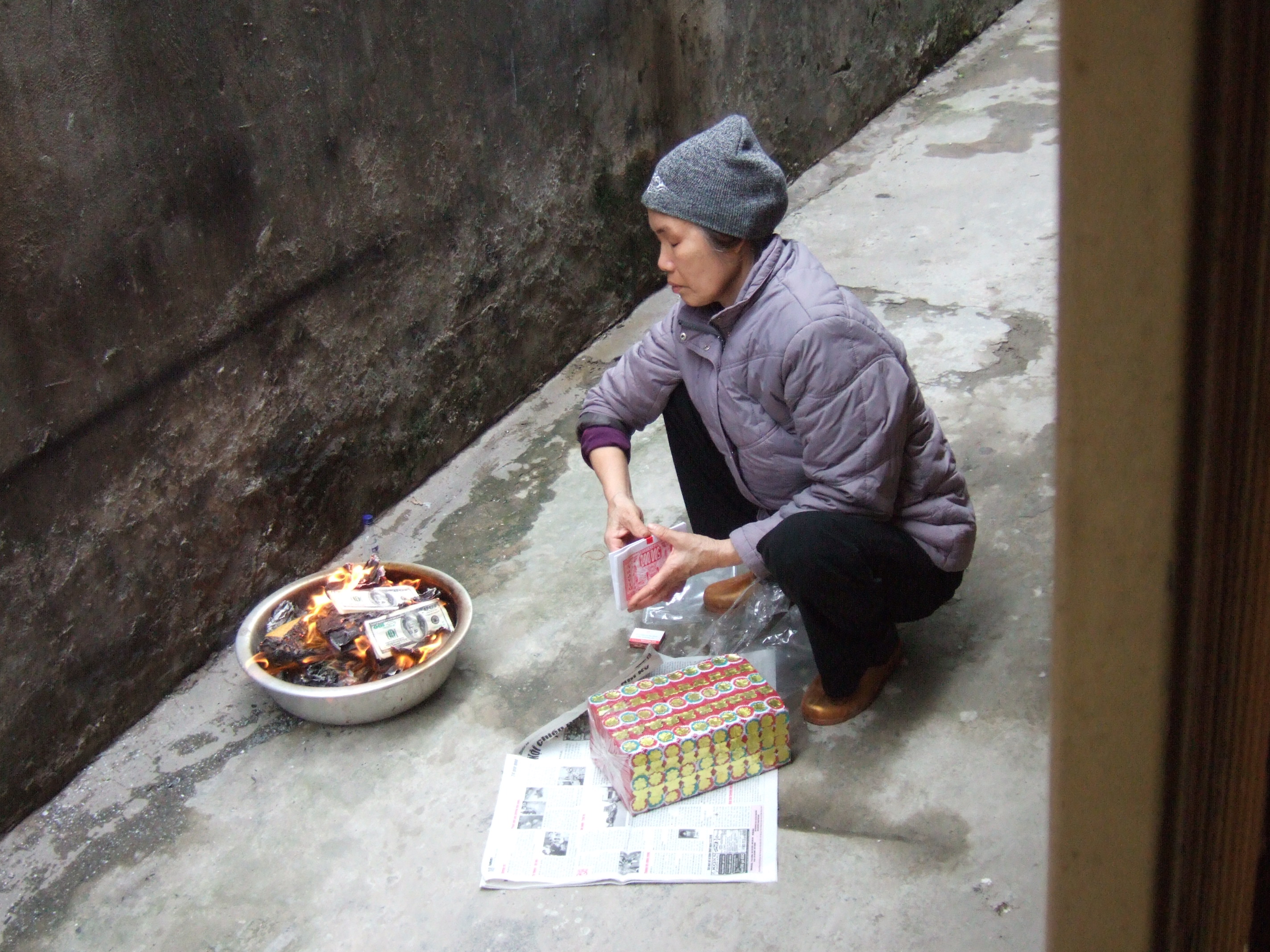
Woman burning joss papers in front of her house in Hanoi after offering food to her ancestors

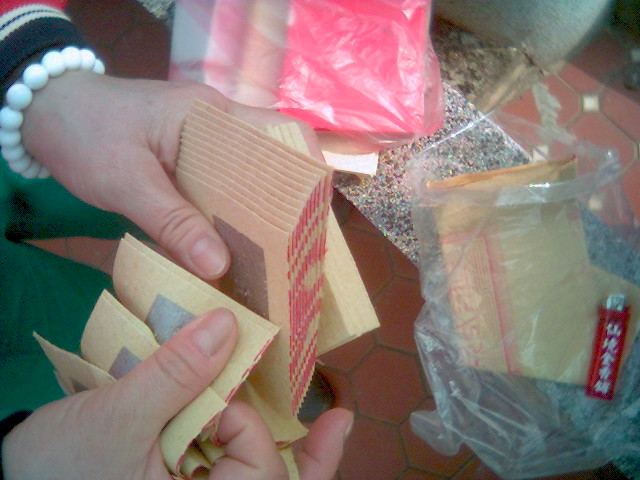
Joss paper of the silver variety being folded for burning

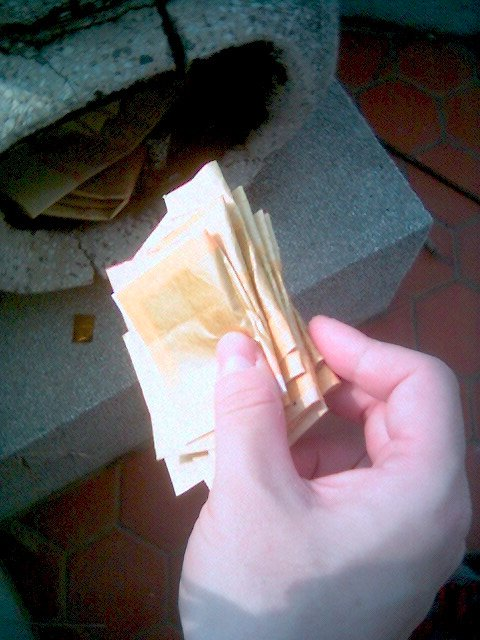
Joss paper folded and ready to be burned as an offering

Many temples have large furnaces outside the main gate to burn joss paper. Folding the paper is an essential part of the burning ceremony as it distinguishes joss paper from actual money; and, it provides good luck for those who fold it. Burning actual money would be untenable for most people, and is also considered unlucky in Asian cultures. The Joss paper may be folded into specific shapes which are meant to bring on good luck and people tend to burn lavish amounts to ensure that the offering is well received.

People burn joss paper during many occasions, e.g., Lunar New Year, Ghost Festival, Mid-Autumn Festival, Dongzhi (Winter solstice), Qingming Festival, Chongyang Festival, Dragon Boat Festival, Hanyi Festival, Tin Hau Festival, etc.

Every fifteen days business owners in Taiwan burn spirit money in red braziers and set out offering tables on the sidewalk for both gods and ghosts. This coincides with an ancient calendar system divided into twenty-four fifteen-day periods.

A simplified modern Chinese offering is made by drawing a circle with chalk on the sidewalk or the pavement between residential buildings and burning the paper offering within the circle. This is quite common in all Chinese cities and villages today.

Due to environmental concerns, some contemporary Joss paper burners are now fitted with a special cover which eliminates the spread of burning ashes. The cover allows enough oxygen in to ensure that all of the offering are completely burned.

Spirit money is most commonly burned, but may also be offered by being held into the wind or placed into the deceased's coffin at funeral ceremonies.

Depending on the type and status of the deity being worshiped, paper with metal foil or with ink seals of various sizes may be burned. Different regions of the world have different preferences for the type of Joss paper that is used. For instance, Hell Bank Notes are commonly found in regions where Cantonese populations dominate but are rarely seen or used in places such as Taiwan or Macau, which use "gold paper". The Joss paper is folded in half, or bought pre-folded into the shape of gold ingots before being burned in an earthenware pot or a specially built chimney. Joss paper burning is usually the last performed act in Chinese deity or ancestor worship ceremonies. The papers may also be folded and stacked into elaborate pagodas or lotuses.

In Taoist rituals, the practice of offering joss paper to deities or ancestors is an essential part of the worship. Some Chinese Buddhist temples, such as Singapore Buddhist Lodge in Singapore and all Fo Guang Shan affiliated temples in Taiwan have discouraged offering of joss papers during ancestral worship in their ancestral tablet hall out of concern for the environmental pollution.

=== Western countries ===
Shops selling joss paper goods have been established in Western countries – such as the USA or the United Kingdom – by Chinese immigrants. For example, Mulberry Street in New York, also known as Chinatown, has papier-mâché retailers which are similar to those in Hong Kong. They serve the Chinese who are living there, in order to celebrate Chinese festivals.

== Health impact ==
Burning of joss paper

Metal contents analysis of ash samples shows that joss paper burning emits copious amounts of toxic components causing health risks. There is a significant amount of heavy metals in the dust fume and bottom ash, e.g., aluminium, iron, manganese, copper, lead, zinc and cadmium. Another study found that burning gold and silver joss papers during festivals may contribute to Parkinson's disease among the elderly and slow child development.

== Types ==
=== Traditional ===
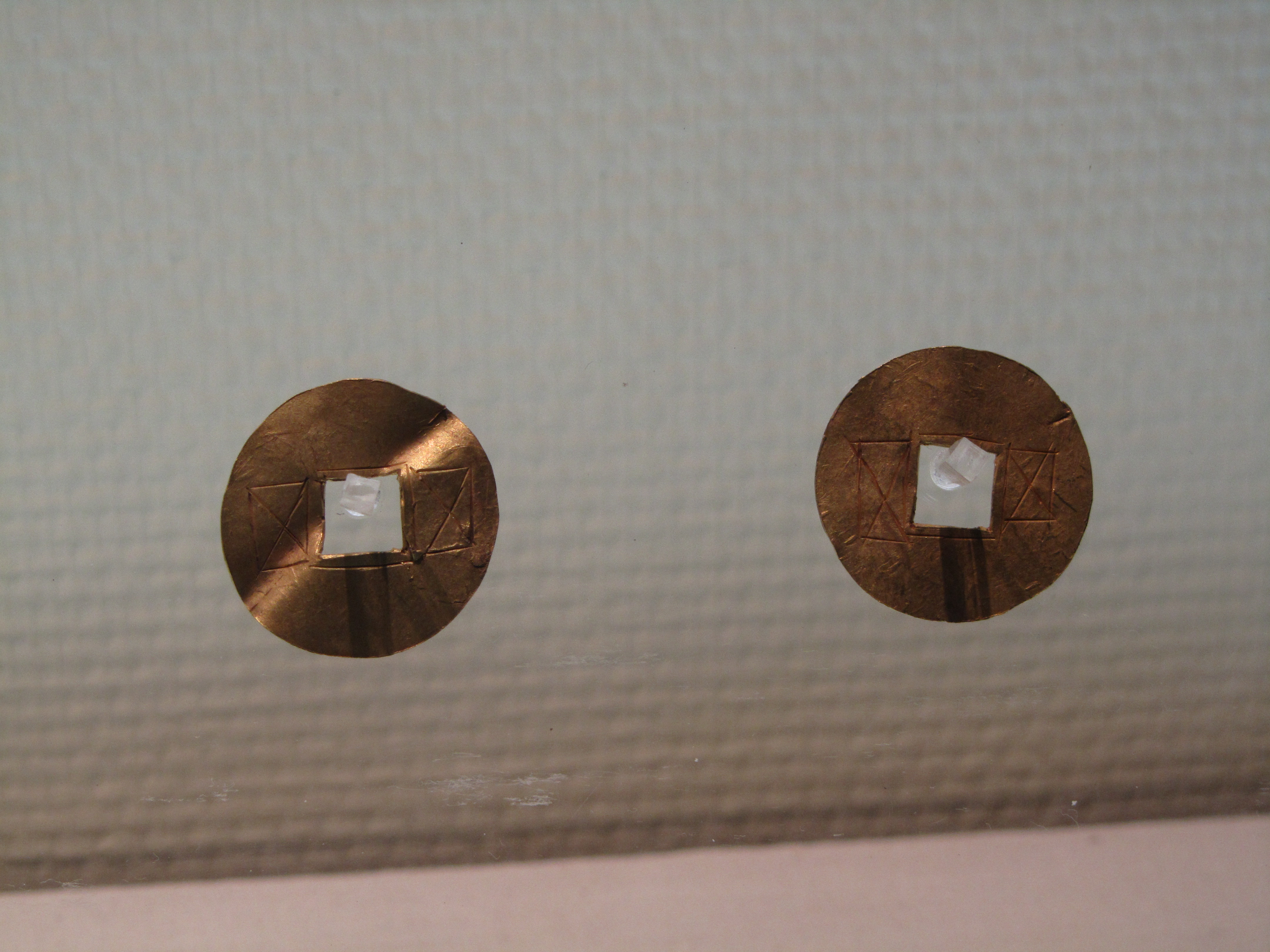
Joss made from gold foil, dating to the Jin dynasty (266–420 AD)

Joss paper is traditionally made from coarse bamboo paper, which feels handmade with many variances and imperfections, although rice paper is also commonly used. Traditional joss is cut into individual squares or rectangles. Depending on the region, joss paper may be decorated with seals, stamps, pieces of contrasting paper, engraved designs or other motifs.

Burning joss paper was popular during the Tang dynasty (618-907 CE) to reduce contagious diseases and bless people. Beginning with the Five Dynasties period (907-960), it became a ritual to wish for good luck and memorialize ancestors.

Different types of spirit money are given to distinct categories of spirits. The three main types of spirit money are cash (also known as copper), silver and gold. Cash monies are given to newly deceased spirits and spirits of the unknown. Golden Joss papers (jin) are mostly offered to the Deities such as the Jade Emperor. Silver Joss paper (yin) is given to ancestral spirits as well as other spirits. These distinctions between the three categories of spirit money must be followed precisely to avoid confusing or insulting the spirits.

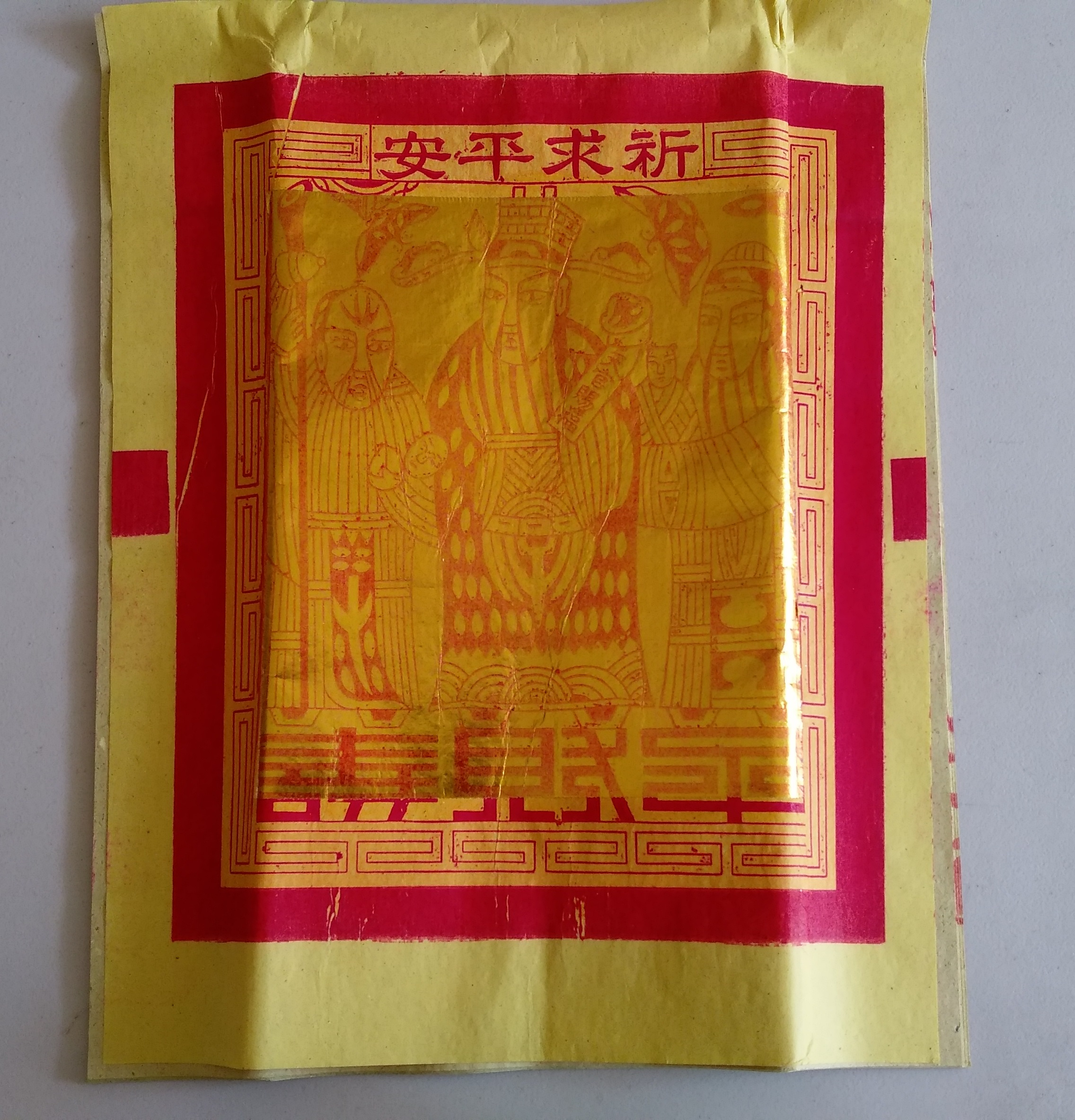
Dabai Shoujin (大百壽金; 'longevity gold'): large paper squares with a golden metallic rectangle imprinted with Fu, Lu & Shou (Three Stars), can be offered to heavenly Deities.

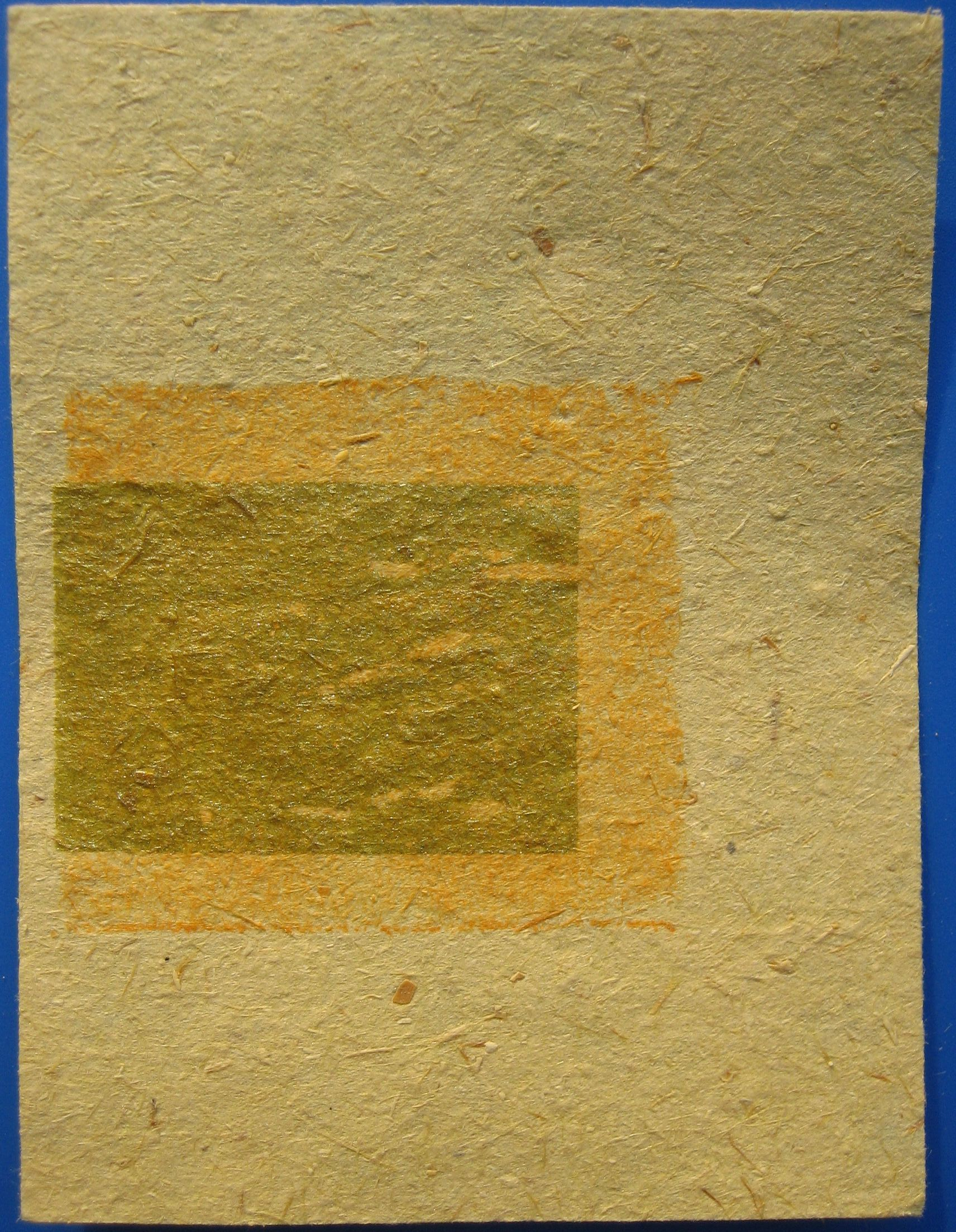
Yijin (刈金; 'cut gold'): large paper squares with a golden metallic rectangle, can be offered to any level of Deities.

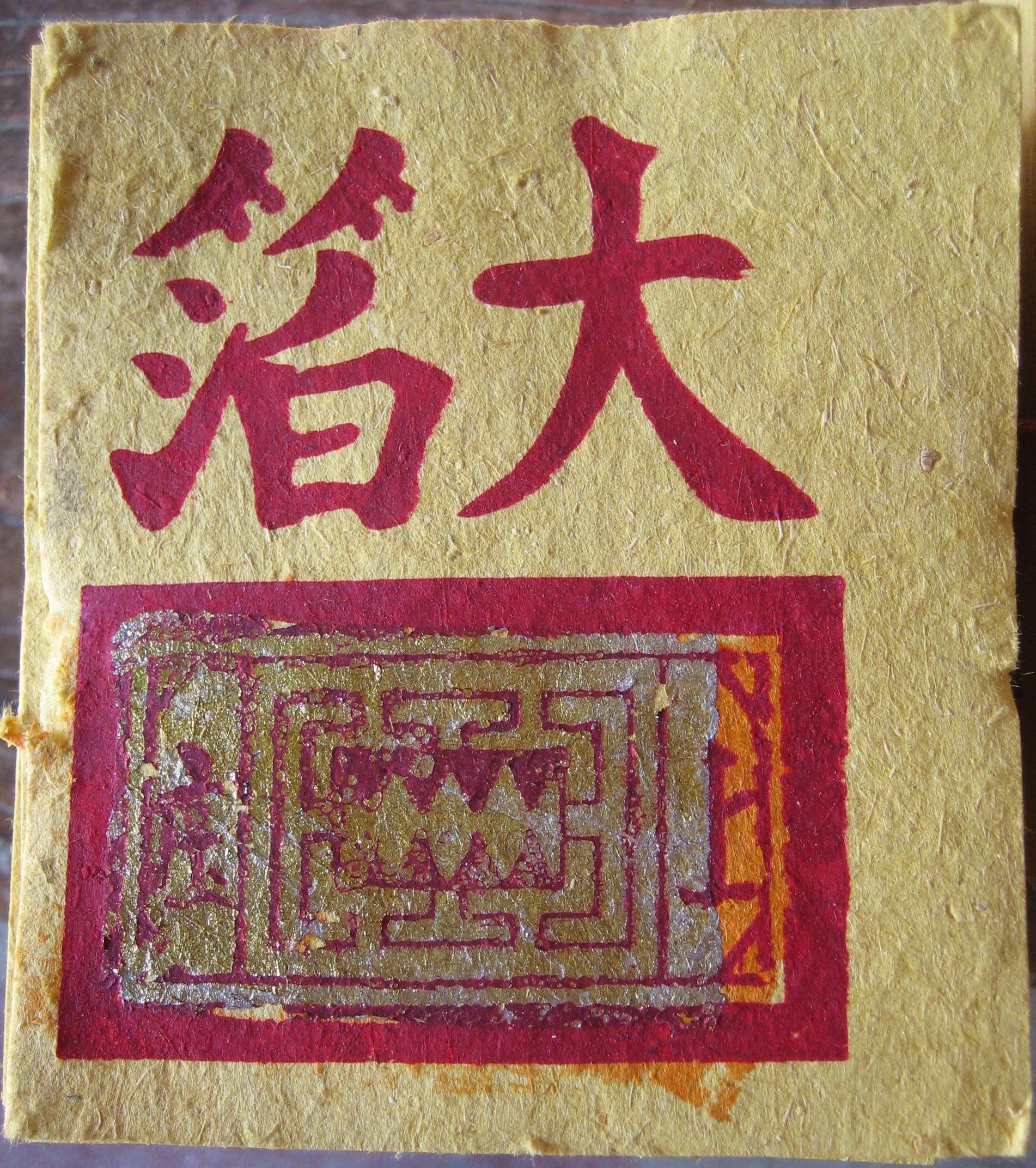
Jiujin (九金; 'nine gold'): large paper squares with a golden metallic rectangle and printed with angled shapes and characters, popular in Southern Taiwan, used to be offered to Deities's spiritual soldiers, more common offer in ancestral worship and earth guardians nowadays.

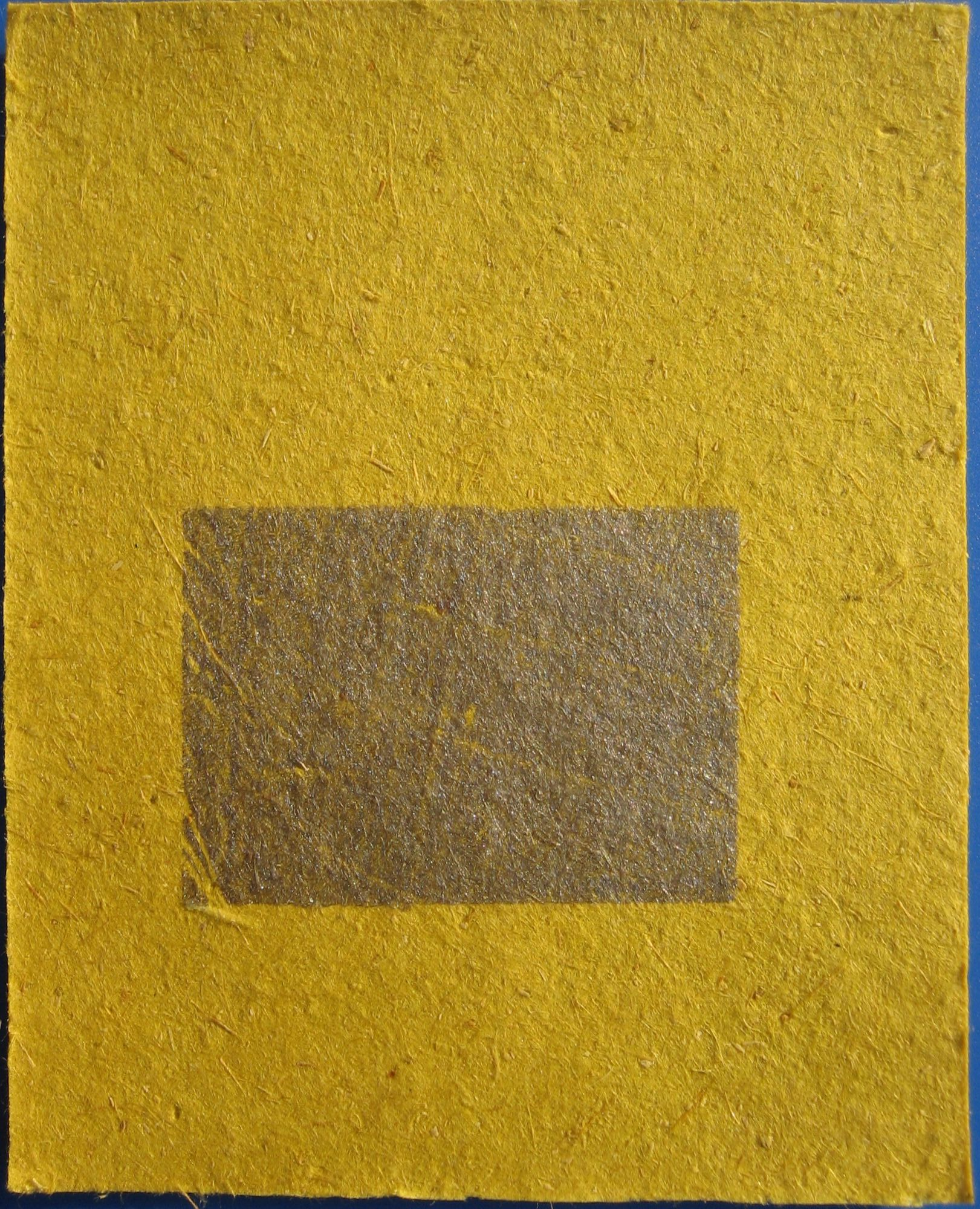
Xiaoyin (小銀; 'lesser silver'): small paper squares with a silver metallic rectangle, burned for close relatives, ancestors and spirits.

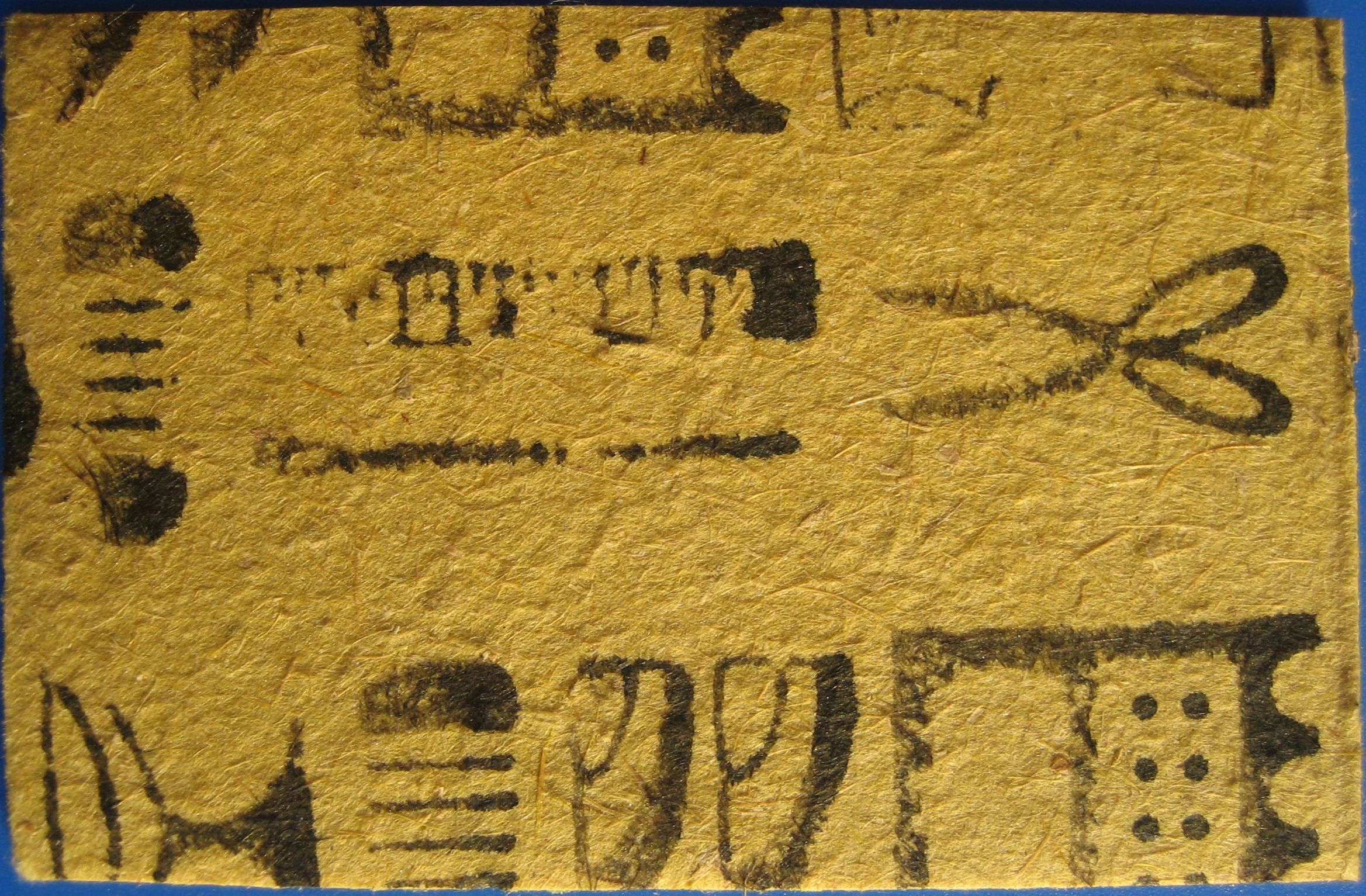
Jingyi (經衣; 'threads and clothes'): A type of joss paper with images of items needed by the dead as "daily necessity", such as clothes, shoes, cups, and scissors, printed on the surface.

=== Contemporary ===
More contemporary or westernized varieties of Joss paper include paper currency, credit cards, cheques, as well as papier-mâché clothes, houses, cars, toiletries, electronics and servants (together known as Zhizha in Mandarin zhǐzhā zh:紙紮). The designs on paper items vary from the very simple to very elaborate (with custom artwork and names).

In 2006, in response to the burning of "messy sacrificial items", such as paper cars, houses, and pills, Dou Yupei, the PRC deputy minister for civil affairs, announced that the ministry intended to ban at least the more extreme forms of joss paper.

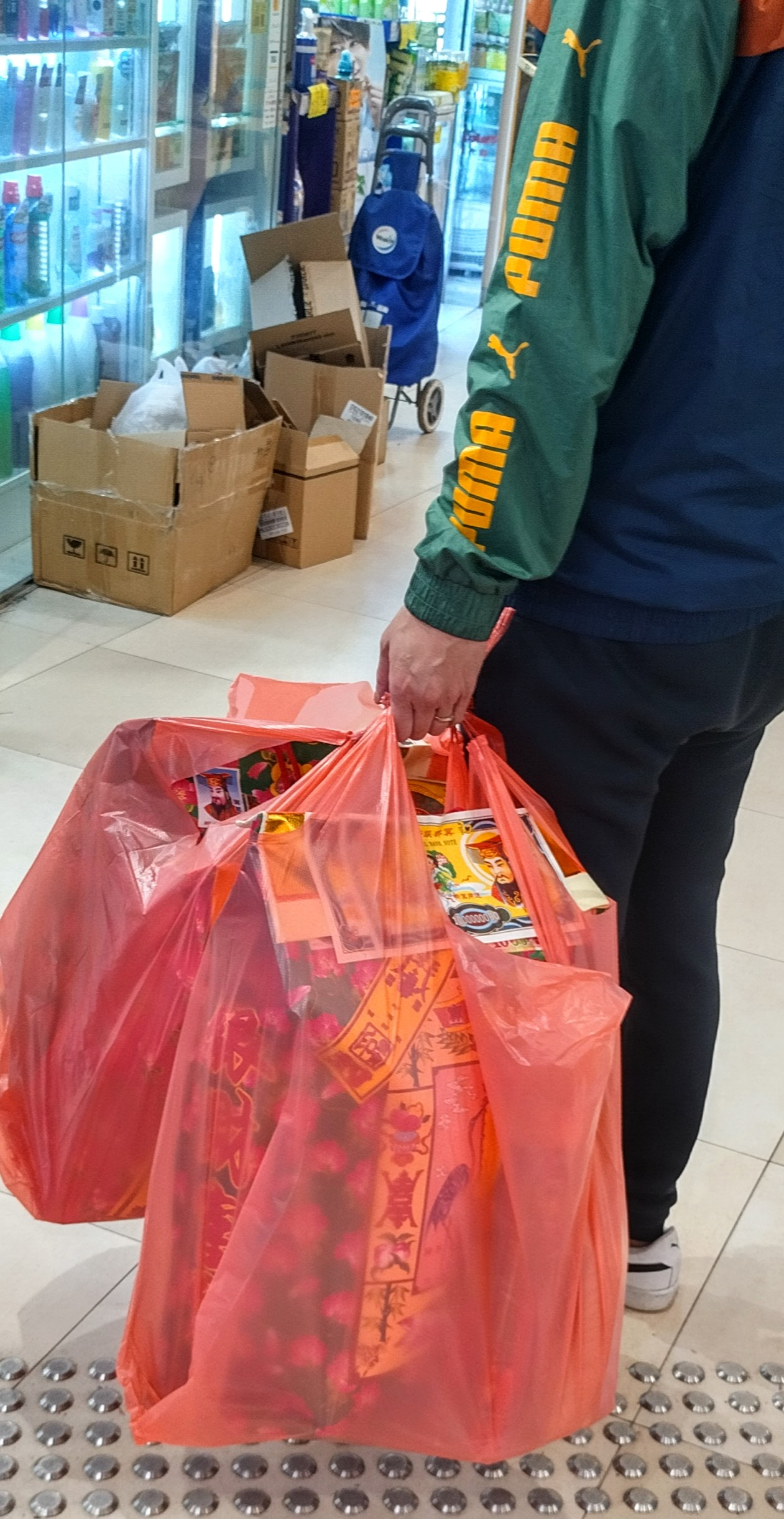
A man carrying bags of joss paper goods

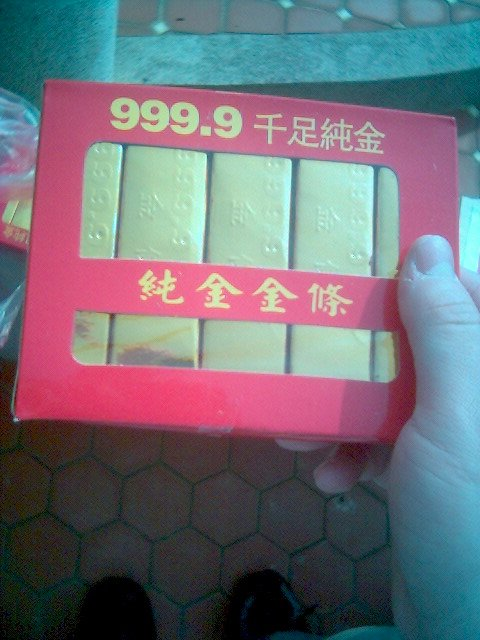
A modern type of joss paper in the folded form and colour of gold bars

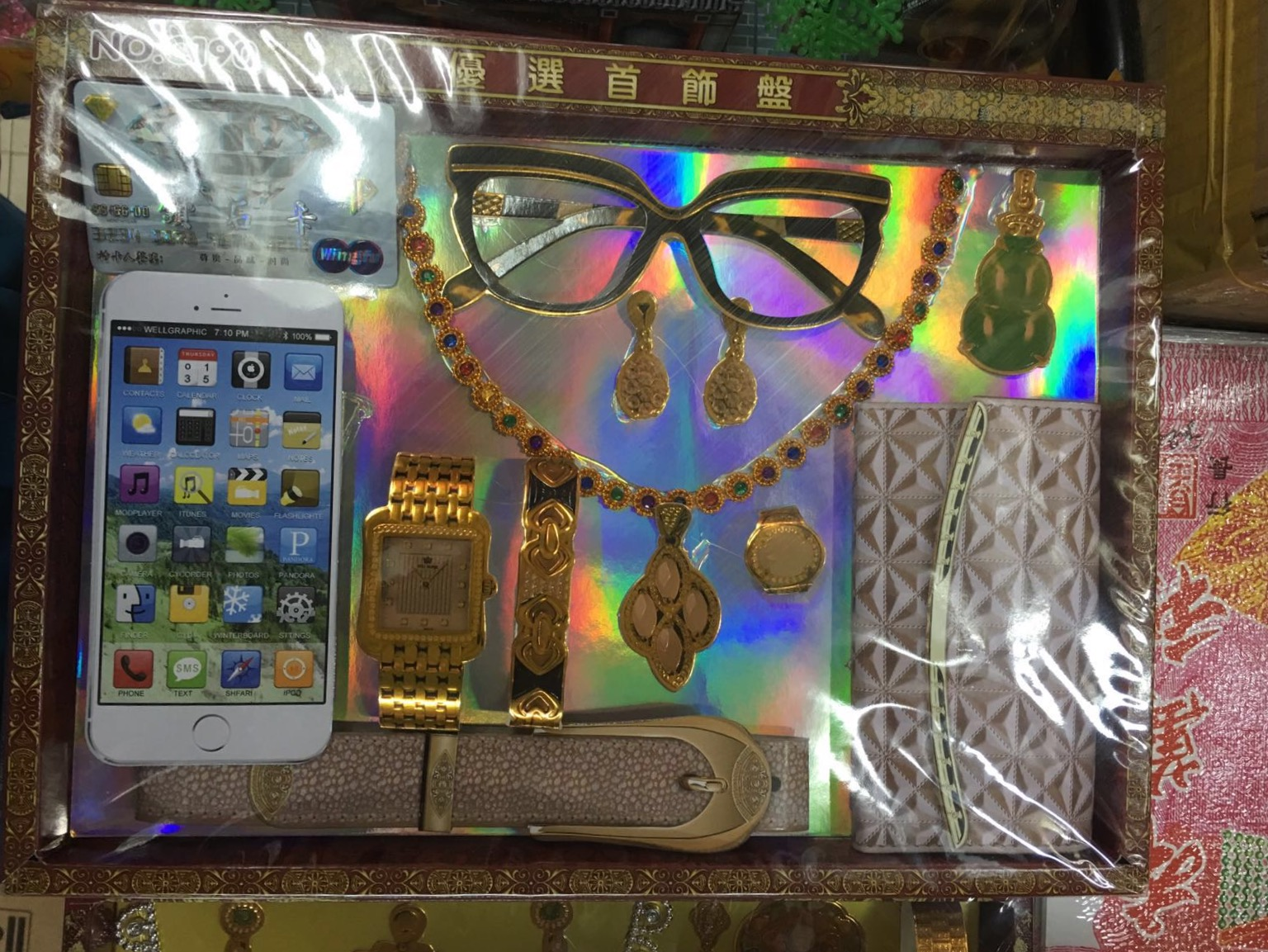
A set of papier-mâché offerings with iPhone and accessories for a female deceased
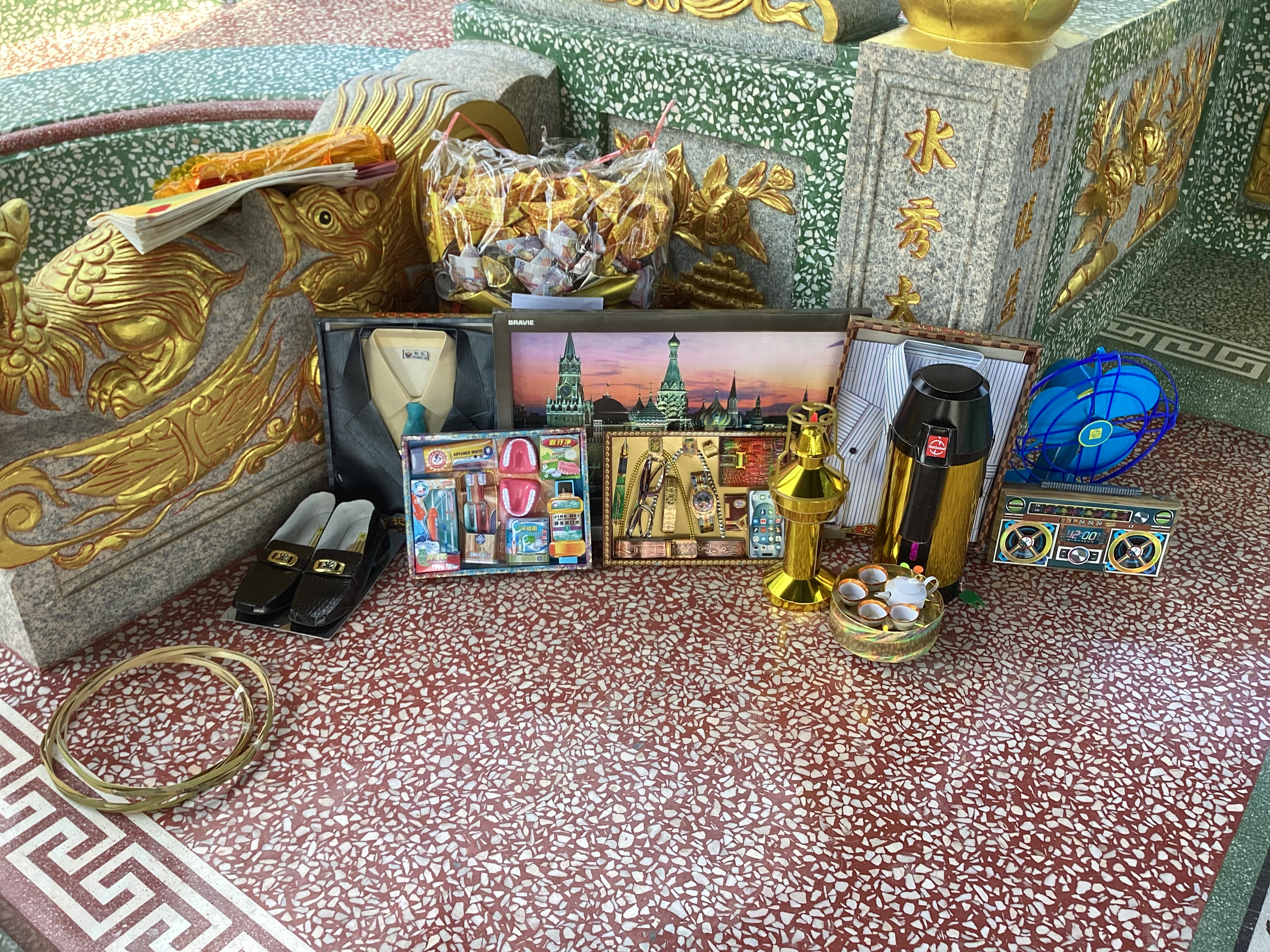
Contemporary joss paper, Thailand, consisting of paper T-shirts, TV, mobile phone, electric fan, radio, electric kettle, tea set, oil lamp, watches, glasses, necklaces, shoes, and other accessories, along with a bag of traditional joss paper and bamboo rings marking the burning area. Shoes are usually burnt last.

==== "Hell Bank Notes" ====
Much like the traditional gold and silver paper, Hell Bank Notes are a modernized version of joss paper and serve as the official currency for the afterlife. Living relatives offer them to dead ancestors by burning (or placing them in coffins in the case of funerals) the bank notes as a bribe to Yanluo for a shorter stay or to escape punishment, or for the ancestors themselves to use in spending on lavish items in the afterlife.

The word "hell" may have been derived from:

1. The preaching of Christian missionaries, who told the Chinese that non-Christians and their ancestors would go to hell when they died as non-believers. Purgatory as taught by certain Christian denominations is a parallel.
2. A translation of the word "hell" that matches the pre-existing Chinese concept of "underworld realm", which in Taoist cosmology had been considered one of the destinations on the journey of rebirth of every soul of the dead regardless of his or her virtue during life.

Hell Bank Notes are also known for their enormous denominations ranging from ten thousand to five million. The bills almost always are in the form of dollars or yuan, and usually feature an image of either the Jade Emperor or Yanluo Wang on the front and the "headquarters" of the Hell Bank on the back. Another common feature is the signatures of both the Yanluo Wang and the Judges of Underworld, both of whom apparently also serve as the Hell bank's governor and deputy governor (as featured on the back). Yet another feature is a Hell Bank Note being a replica of a United States one-hundred-dollar bill, with a disclaimer noting the bill is counterfeit.

== Regulation ==
Certain provinces in China have banned the burning of joss paper out of concern for the air pollution it causes.

== See also ==
=== Health ===
- Black carbon
- Manganese poisoning
- Particulates
- Soot
- Toxic heavy metal

=== Others ===
- Air pollution in Hong Kong
- Ancestral temple
- Chinese burial money
- Coins for the dead
- Pollution in China
- Religious goods store
