= Hell money =

Form of joss paper printed to resemble bank notes

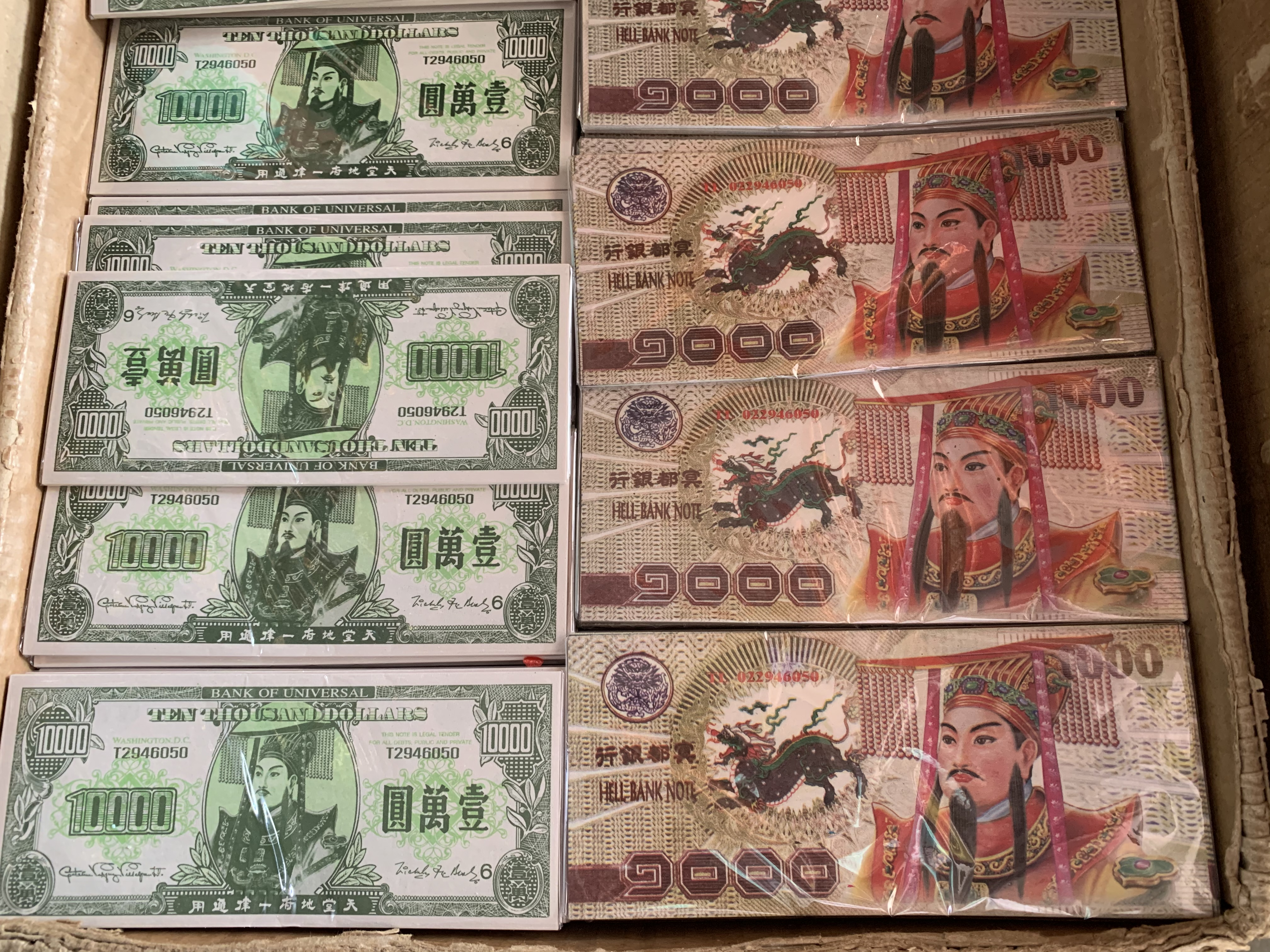
Hell banknotes in Thailand resembling United States Dollar, and Thai Baht banknotes

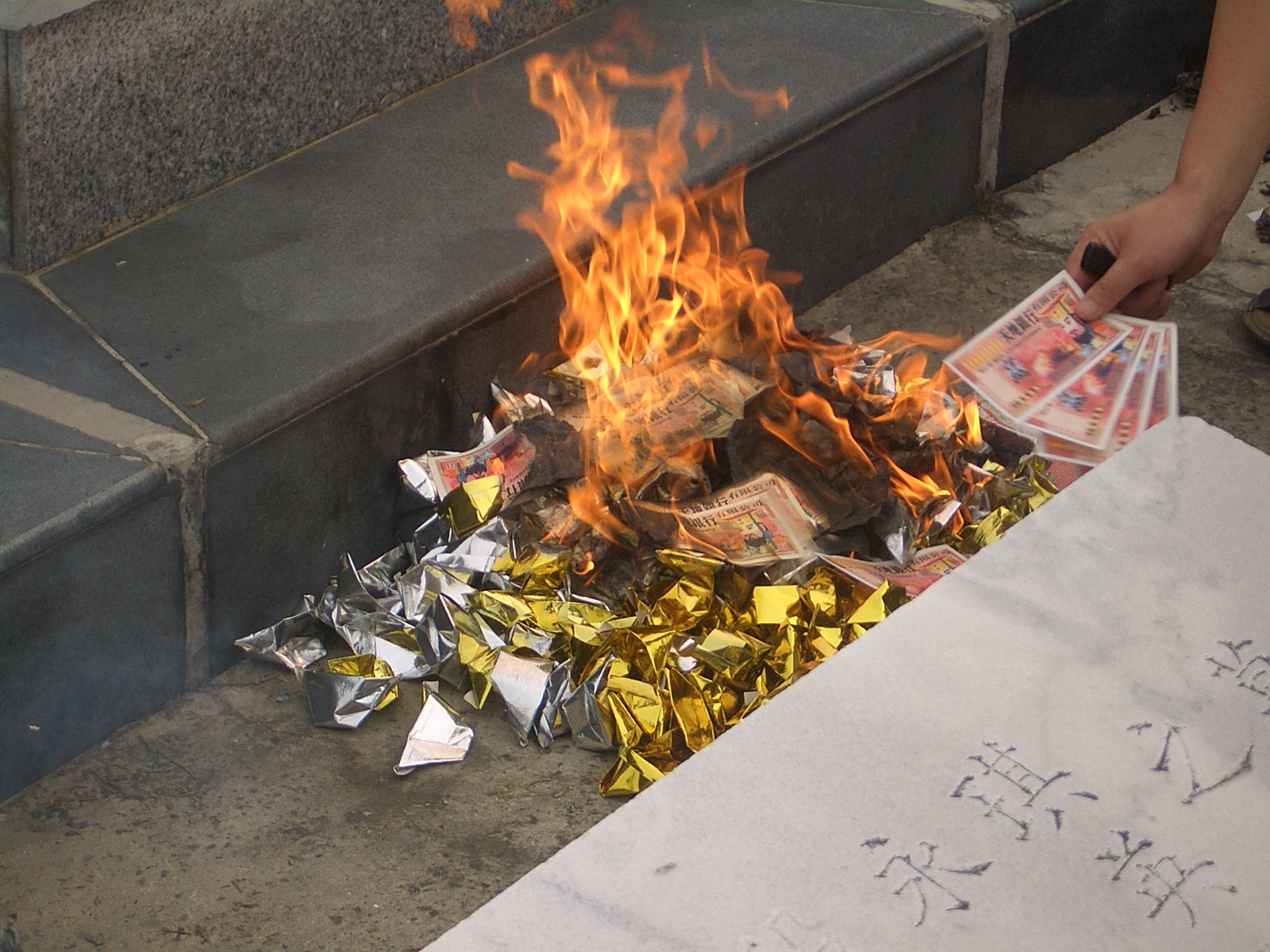
Joss paper money being burnt near a grave along with joss yuanbao during the Chinese Ghost Festival

Hell money (Chinese: 冥鈔; pinyin: míngchāo) is a modernized form of joss paper printed to resemble legal tender bank notes. The notes are not an official form of recognized currency or legal tender as their sole intended purpose is to be offered as burnt offerings to the deceased as a solution to resolve their assumed monetary problems in the afterlife. This ritual has been practiced by modern Chinese and across East Asia since the late 19th century, and some Wicca-based faiths in recent years have adopted this practice. Early 20th century examples bore resemblance to minor commercial currency of the type issued by businesses across China until the mid-1940s.

The identification of this type of joss paper as "hell bank notes" or "hell money" is largely a Western construct, since these items are simply regarded as yet another form of joss paper (冥幣, 陰司紙, 紙錢, or 金紙) in East Asian cultures and have no special name or status.

== Name ==
The word hell on hell bank notes refers to Diyu (traditional Chinese: 地獄; simplified Chinese: 地狱; pinyin: dìyù, "underworld prison"; also 地府, dìfǔ, "underworld court"). These words are printed on some notes. In traditional Chinese belief, it is thought to be where the souls of the dead are first judged by the Lord of the Earthly Court, Yama (Yanluo Wang). After this particular judgment, they are either escorted to heaven or sent into the maze of underworld levels and chambers to atone for their sins. People believe that even in the earthly court, spirits need to use money, whether to bribe officials of the afterlife or to supplement the offerings the dead person have made while they were alive, to atone for their sins.

The concept of Diyu parallels purgatory as taught by certain Christian denominations. A popular anecdote claims that the word hell was introduced to China by Christian missionaries, who preached that all non-Christian Chinese people would go to hell after death. The word "hell" was thus misinterpreted to be the proper English term for the afterlife, and was thusly adopted as such. Some printed notes attempt to correct this by omitting the word "hell" and sometimes replacing it with "heaven" or "paradise". These particular bills are usually found in joss packs meant to be burned for Chinese deities, and are usually differently colored but have the same design as hell bank notes.

== Designs ==
Earlier examples of these notes were issued in denominations of 5 and 10 yuan and upwards, with such amounts being considered adequate until inflation took hold within China from 1944. The soaring denominations of authentic currency was soon reflected in that issued for the afterlife, and after 1945 the majority of hell banknotes were issued in denominations of $10,000 or higher. These earlier issues more commonly depict landscape scenes, temples or trains, and the numerous varieties may literally number into the millions.

Modern hell bank notes are known for their large denominations, ranging from $10,000 to several billions. The obverse usually bears an effigy of the Jade Emperor, the presiding monarch of heaven in Taoism, and the countersignature of Yanluo (閻羅) who act as the bank's governor and deputy governor. There is usually an image of the Bank of Hell on the reverse of the notes.

A commonly sold hell bank note is the $10,000 note that is styled after the old United States Federal Reserve Note and the $5,000,000 note that is styled after the Chinese gold yuan. The obverse contains, apart from the portrait of the Jade Emperor, the seal of the Bank of Hell consisting of a picture of the bank itself. Many tiny, faint "Hell Bank Note"s are scattered on the back in yellow. These are sold in packs of 50 to 150, and are wrapped in cellophane.

Stores that specialize in selling ritual items, such as the religious goods stores in Malaysia, also sell more elaborately decorated notes that have a larger denomination than the usual $10,000 note. Some bills do not portray the Jade Emperor, and portray other famous figures from Chinese mythology instead, such as the Eight Immortals, the Buddha, Yama, or images of dragons. Some notes from Vietnam even portray famous people who are deceased, such as USSR leader Joseph Stalin, US President John F. Kennedy and Marilyn Monroe, though these were created as jokes and are not meant to be used as real joss money.

== Customs ==
When burning the notes, the notes are placed as a loose bundle, in a manner that is considered respectful. Alternatively, in some customs, each bank note may be folded in a specific way before being tossed into the fire due to the belief that burning real money brings bad luck.

While the custom of burning hell bank notes remains legal in China, the Ministry of Civil Affairs has, as of 2006, banned the practice of "vulgar" burned offerings for the deceased. According to the Ministry, the ban on offerings such as paper "luxury villas, sedan cars, mistresses, and other messy sacrificial items" was part of an effort to eradicate "feudal" and superstitious behavior.

The act of giving a living person hell bank notes is considered a great insult in Chinese culture and may even be seen as a death threat.

The University of Toronto experienced controversy after members of the University's Graduate House team distributed red envelopes containing joss money, allegedly in error, as part of its Lunar New Year's celebrations in 2022.

== See also ==
- Ancestor worship
- Chinese burial money
- Ghost Festival
- Joss paper
- Religious goods store
- Charon's obol
- Lucky money
- Money spraying
