= Guanyin Temple =

Guanyin Temple may refer to:

- Nanhai Guanyin Temple, Buddhist temple in Foshan, China
- Siyu Silin Guanyin Temple, Buddhist temple in Dachi Village, Taiwan
- Penghu Guanyin Temple, Buddhist temple in Taiwan
- Daguankou Guanyin Temple, Buddhist temple in Taiwan
