= Daguankou Guanyin Temple =

Buddhist temple in Taiwan

- 大關口觀音寺
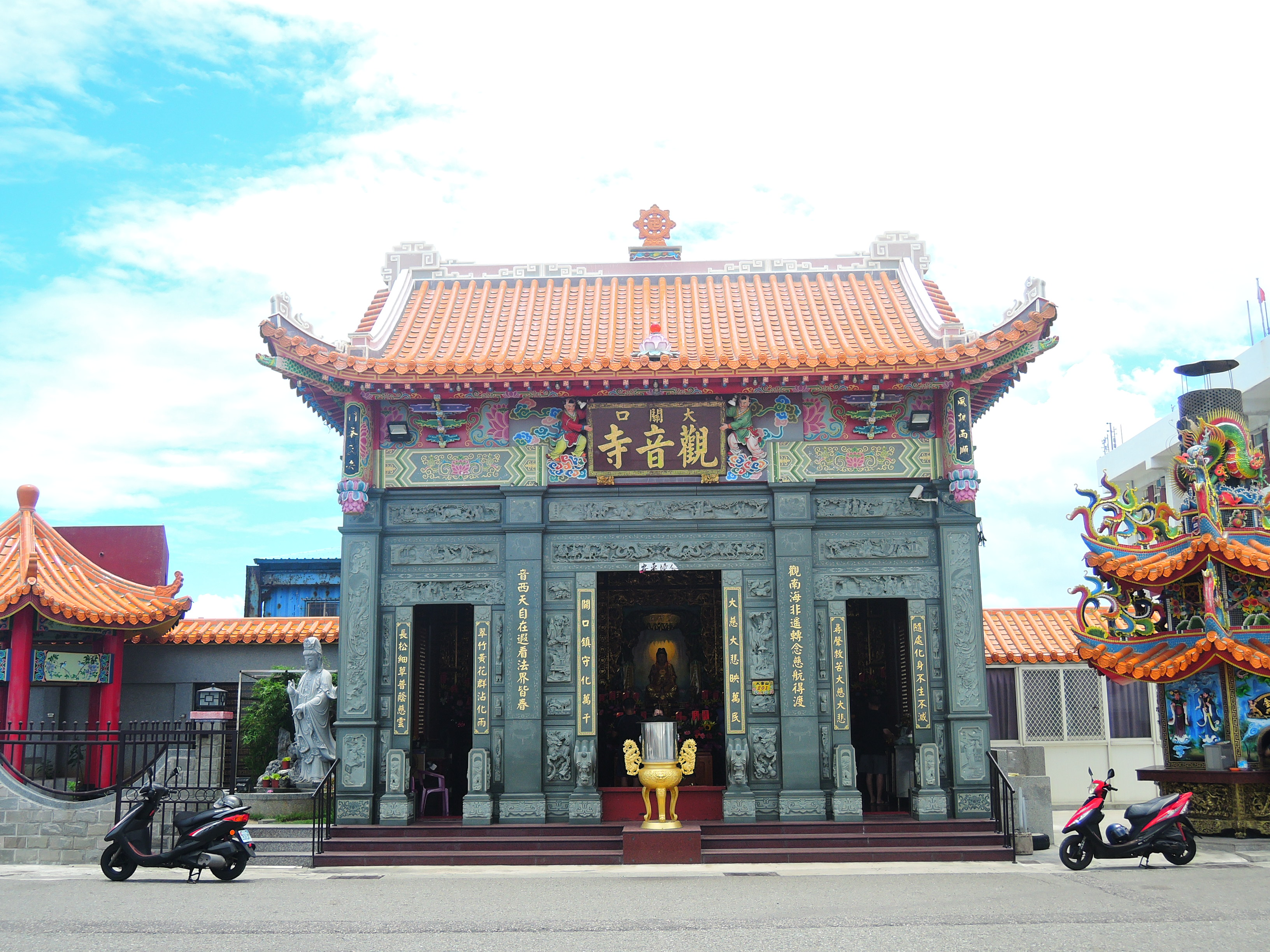

Religion
- Affiliation: Buddhism
- Sect: Taiwan Folk Buddhism
- Festivals: Lunar Calendar: February 2; June 2; September 2

Location
- Location: 201 Da'anshan, Anshan Village, Magong, Penghu, Taiwan 澎湖縣馬公市案山里大案山201號
- Country: Taiwan
- Interactive map of Daguankou Guanyin Temple
- Coordinates: 23°56′30.5″N 119°57′28.3″E

Architecture
- Established: 1987 (ROC 76)

Daguankou Guanyin Temple (Chinese: 大關口觀音寺; pinyin: Dà guānkǒu guānyīn sì) is located in Anshan Village, Magong, Penghu County in Taiwan. This temple is dedicated to Guanyin. Situated beside the Penghu Offshore Flotilla (or Offshore Flotilla 8th Fleet Branch) ,Coast Guard Administration at Magong Third Fishing Port.

== History ==
In 1987, Kung Ching-yu (孔慶玉), who was then serving at the Magong Harbor Inspection Office, discovered a Guanyin Bodhisattva statue that had fallen into the sea and washed up inside the seawall of Magong First Fishing Port. Together with an elderly woman who sold drinks nearby, they built a simple wooden shelter near the inspection office to enshrine the statue, offering tea and prayers every day.

Over time, many fishing and commercial vessels passed through the area. Fishermen heading out to sea, as well as police and coast guard personnel before starting their duties, developed the habit of stopping by to pay respects to this Guanyin. Stories of the statue’s miraculous blessings began to spread, and the temple’s incense offerings grew increasingly prosperous.

In 1993, as part of urban planning efforts, the Coast Guard Inspection Office at Magong First Fishing Port was relocated to the Magong Third Fishing Port in Anshan Village. Before the move, the personnel sought Guanyin Bodhisattva’s permission to accompany them, and through a divination ritual (跋桮 / bwa bwei), they received the Bodhisattva’s approval. Thus, the statue was moved along with the station to Anshan.

After the relocation, the Guanyin statue was initially enshrined in an office on the upper floor of the new building. However, devotees found it inconvenient to worship there, so a modest temporary shrine was built on an open space next to the office, allowing the public easier access for their prayers.

In 2003, devotees formed a Reconstruction Committee and raised funds to build a new temple. In 2006, however, the Penghu District Court ruled that the temple had been built on state-owned land without authorization. Although the ruling was finalized, the temple was not demolished. The issue sparked public debate when Tsai Kuang-ming (蔡光明), then chairman of the Magong City Council, criticized the handling of the case and called for the site to be returned to the government.

Subsequently, with guidance from the Penghu County Government, the temple committee obtained legal approval for the land. Construction of the new temple began in the eighth lunar month of 2008, and on the 20th day of the eighth lunar month in 2011, the sacred fire was installed, marking the completion of the temple as it appears today.

== Gallery ==
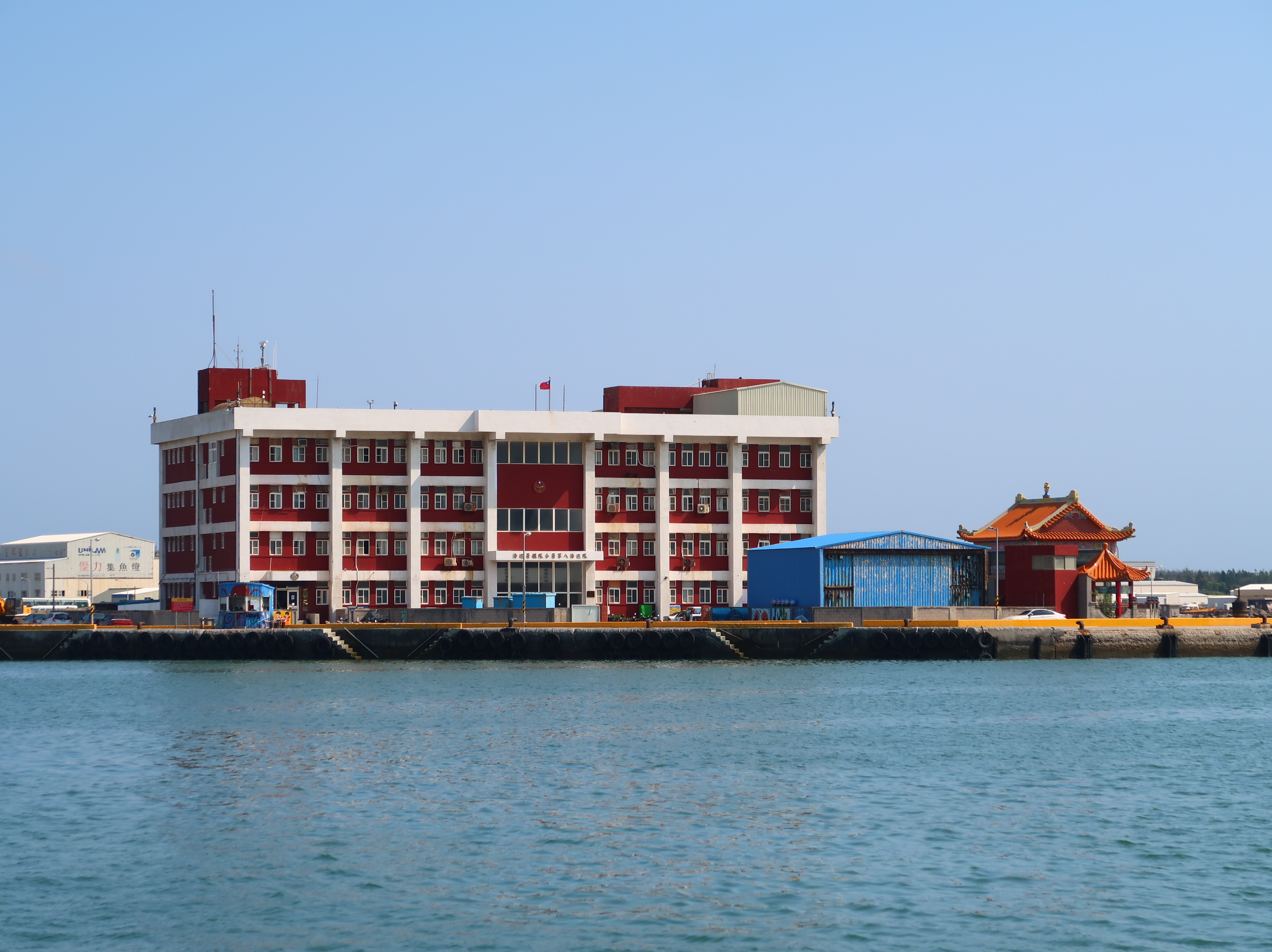
Temple and Penghu Coast Guard Inspection

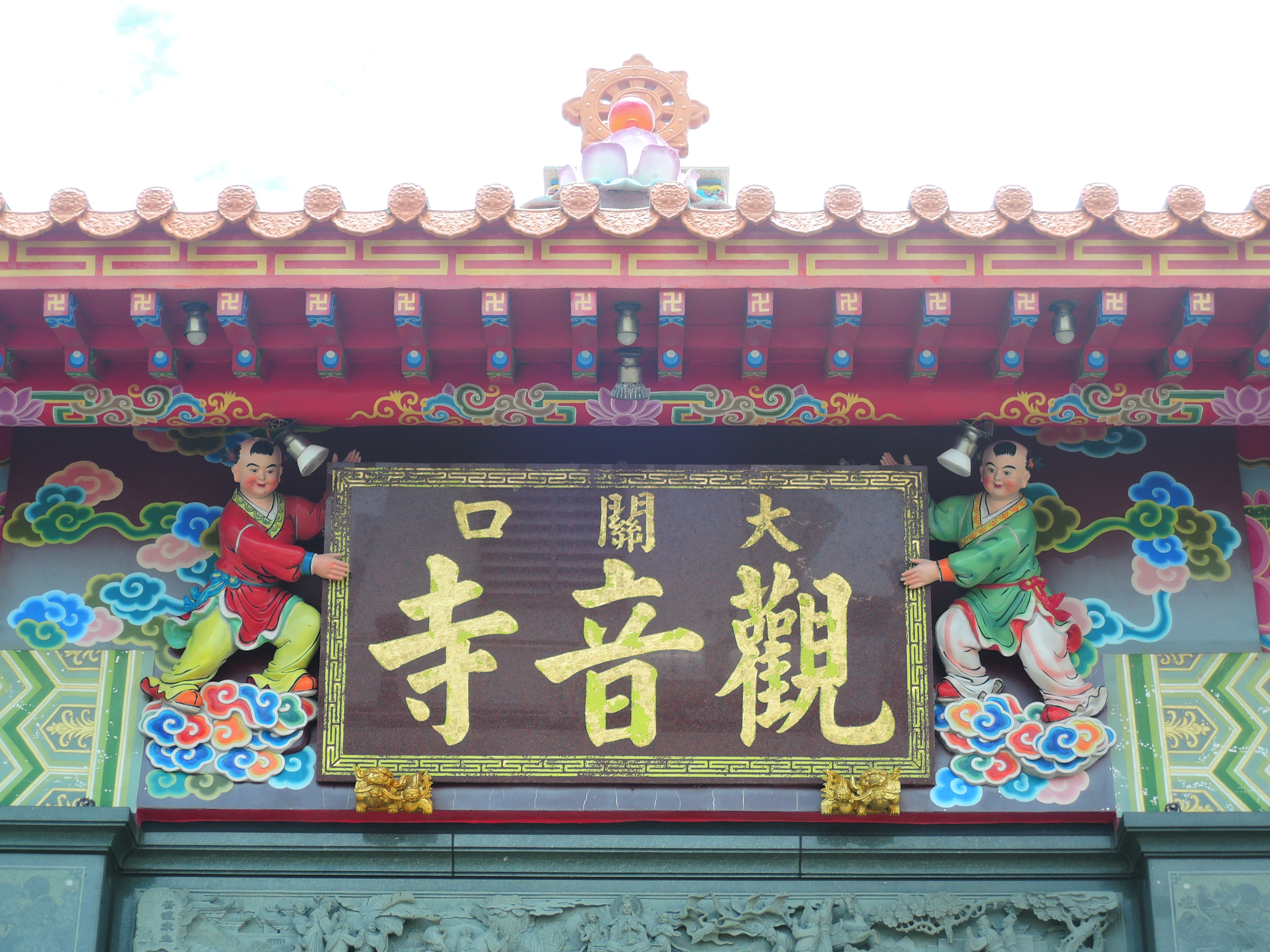
Inscription of Temple's Name

Guanyin Bodhisattva statue

Inscription Commemorating the Completion of the New Temple (Erected in 2011)

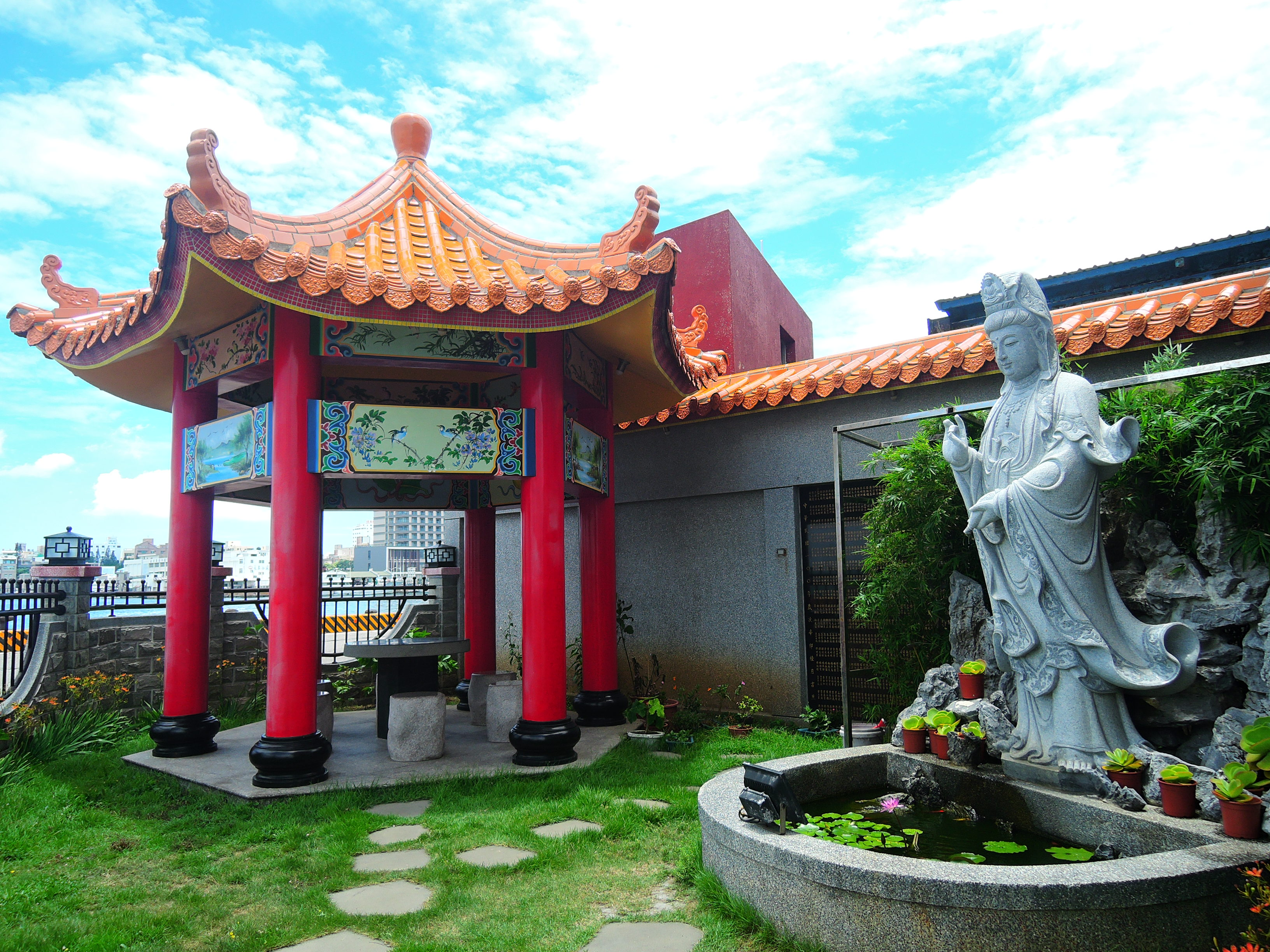
Guanyin and pavilion

== See also ==
- Penghu Guanyin Temple （澎湖觀音亭）
- Siyu Silin Guanyin Temple （西嶼西林寺）
- Chengyuan Tang Temple （澄源堂）
