= Siyu Silin Guanyin Temple =

Buddhist temple in Dachi Village, Taiwan

Coordinates: 23°36′56″N 119°30′26″E

Silin Guanyin Temple
- 大池西林寺

Religion
- Affiliation: Buddhism
- Sect: Taiwan Folk Buddhism
- Festivals: Lunar Calendar: February 2; June 2; September 2

Location
- Location: 38-5 Dachi Village, Siyu, Penghu 881 Taiwan; 881 澎湖縣西嶼鄉大池村38-5號
- Country: Taiwan
- Interactive map of Silin Guanyin Temple

Architecture
- Established: 2014 (ROC 103)

Siyu Silin Guanyin Temple (Chinese: 大池西林寺; pinyin: Dàchí xīlín sì) is dedicated to Guanyin Bodhisattva, and it is located in Dachi Village of Siyu, Penghu County in Taiwan.

== History ==
"Dachi", formerly called "Tuā-tî-kak" (大池角, literally, Cape of Big Pond) in Taiwanese, this Guanyin was originally enshrined as an accompanying deity in Dachi Zhi’an Temple.

According to records, in 1999, while the temple attendant of Zhi’an Temple was offering incense, a sudden white smoke rose from the incense burner, leaving him puzzled. He then invited Nezha (Third Lotus Prince, Chinese:三太子, Taiwanese:Sam-thài-tsú) to descend and provide guidance. Upon descending, the Third Lotus Prince revealed that the Guanyin of Zhi’an Temple wished to move out to cultivate in seclusion. Following this message, the villagers relocated the Guanyin and enshrined her in the lord of the land temple on the eastern side of Dachi Village.

At the time, Wang Kuo-hua (王國華), then head of Dachi Village, considered that land temple, which measured only 18 Pyeong (about 60 square meters), too small, and thus planned to find a new site. After discussions with the villagers, they decided to purchase land and construct a Buddhist temple. (Note: Inscription Commemorating the Completion of the Silin Temple.)

In 2009, newly reclaimed land along the harbor in front of Dachi Zhi’an Temple was acquired from the National Property Administration. On the 2nd day of the eighth lunar month in 2010, construction began. In 2011, Xuantian Shangdi, the principal deity of the original Dachi Zhi’an Temple, instructed that the new Guanyin temple be named "Silin Temple" (西林寺, its name literally means "West Woods Temple"). On the 3rd day of the third lunar month in 2014, Silin Temple was completed.

== Gallery ==
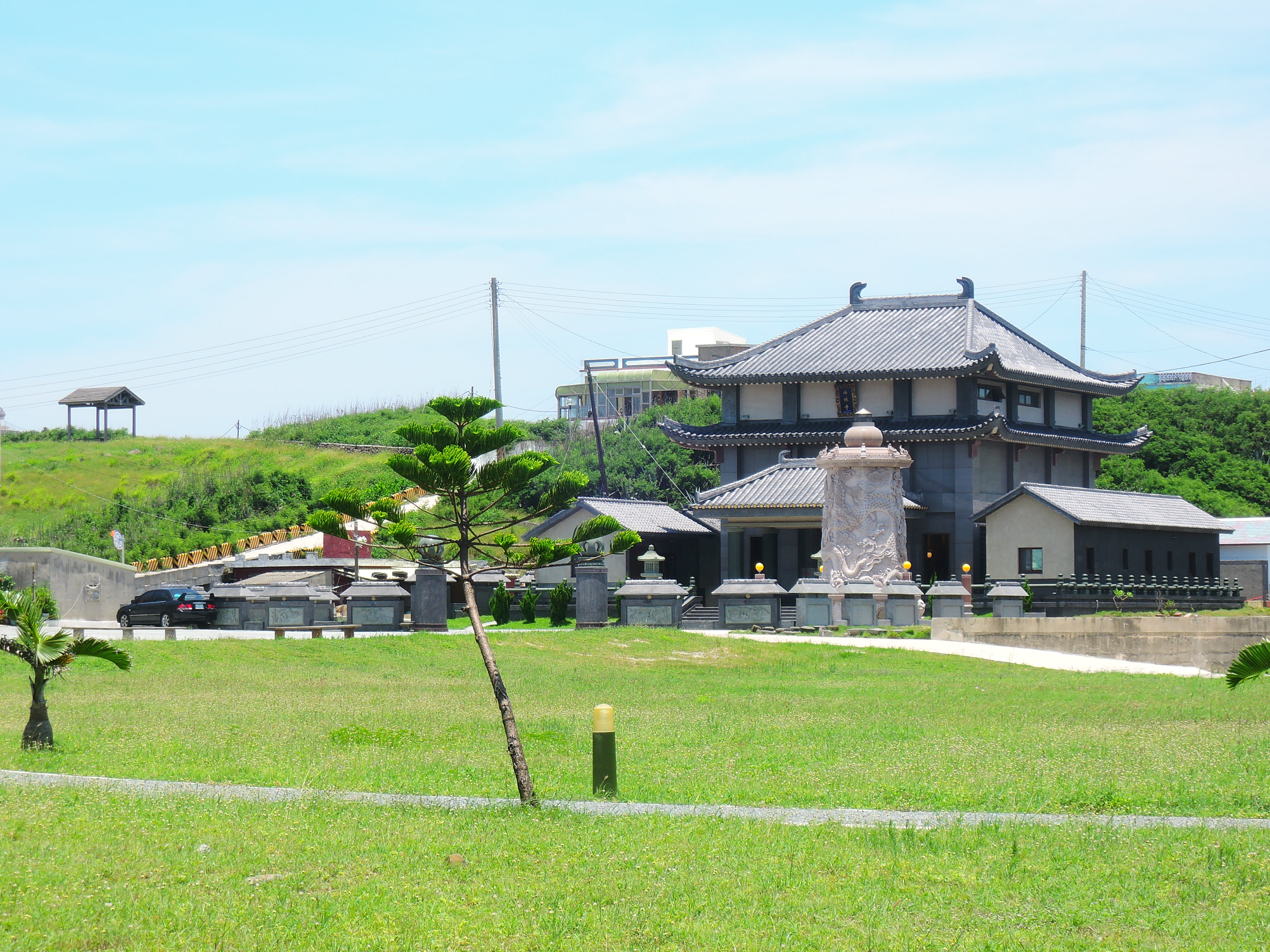
Silin Temple and its forecourt

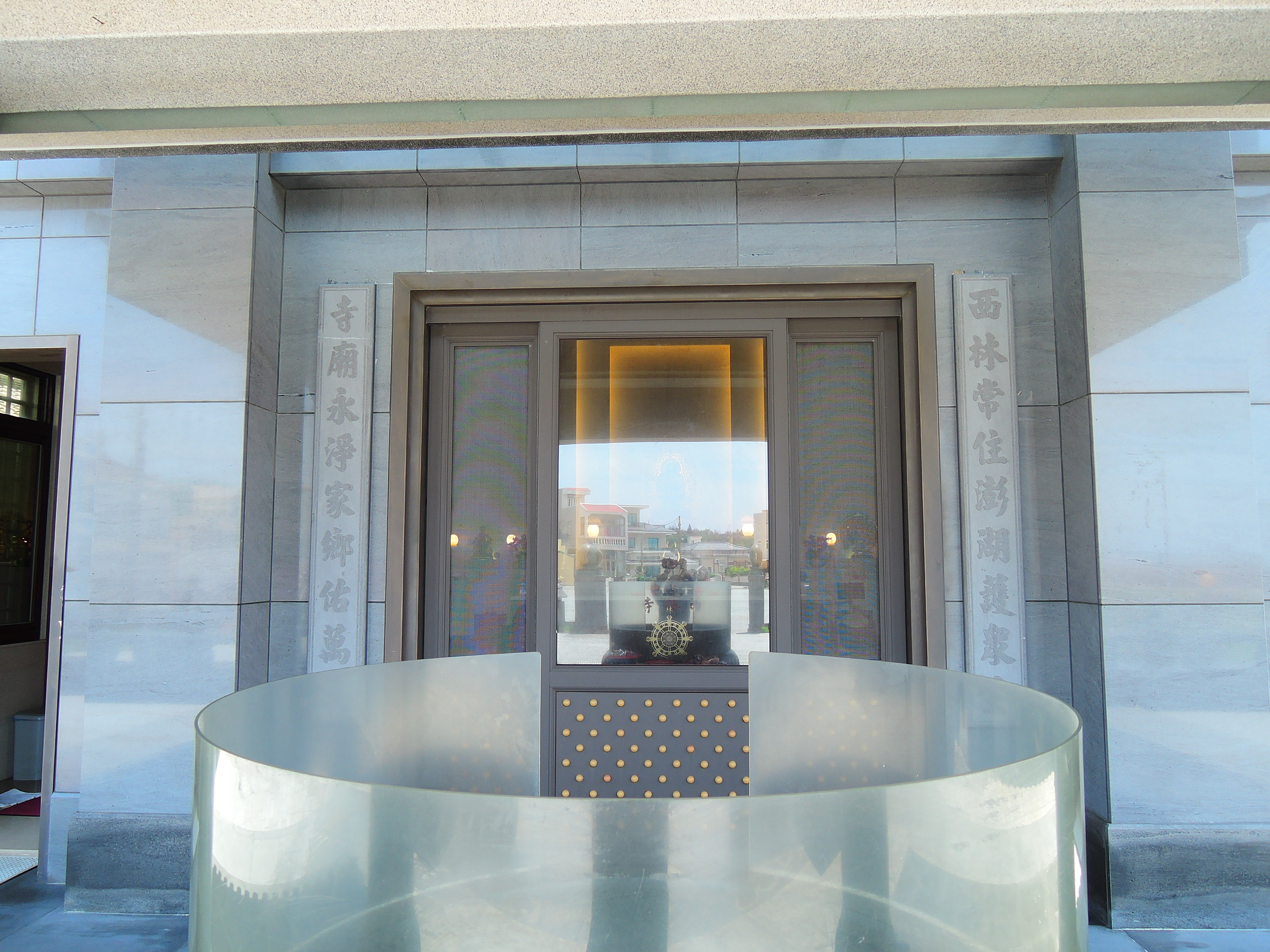
Entrance and couplets

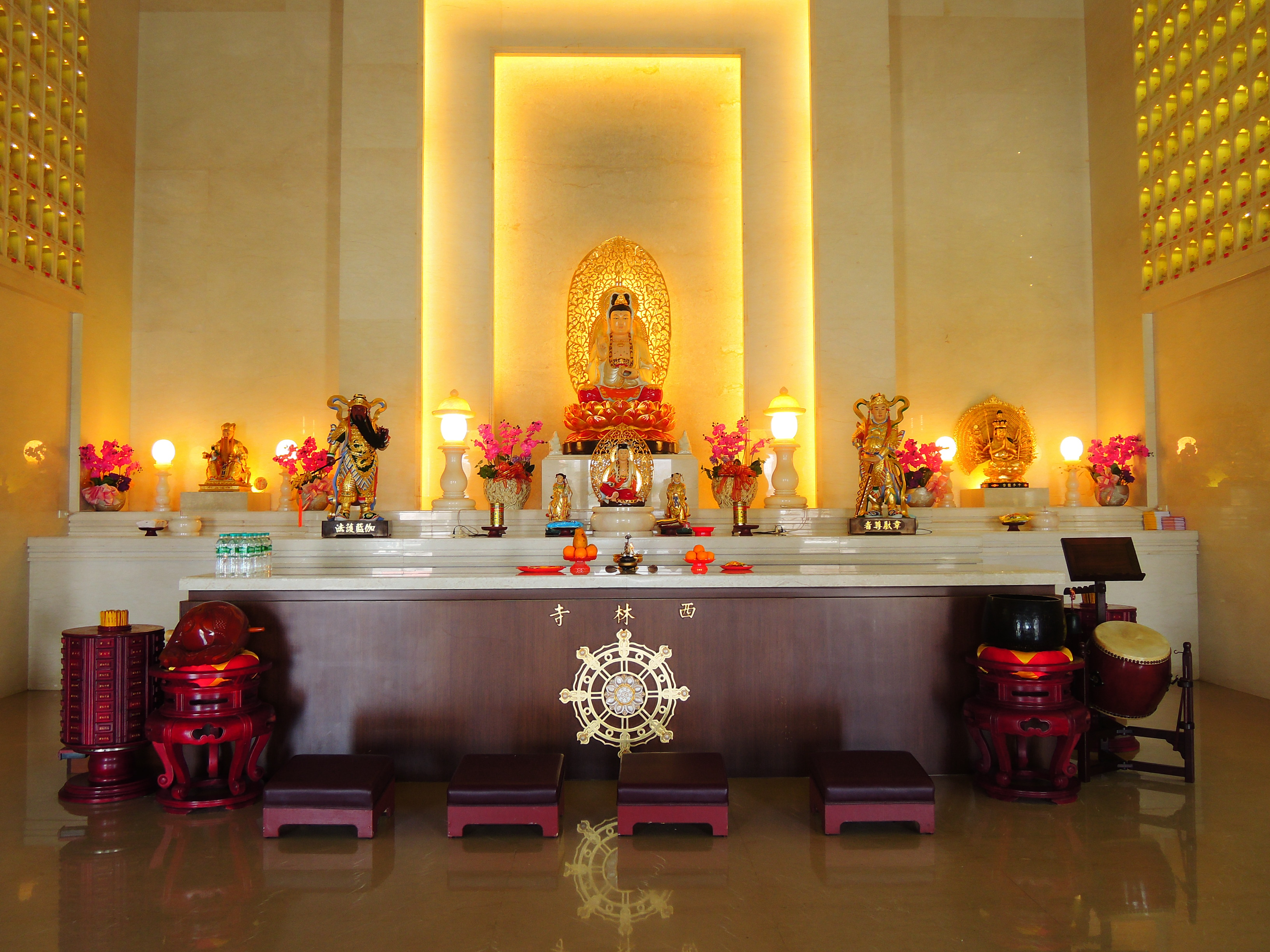
Buddhist altar in the main hall

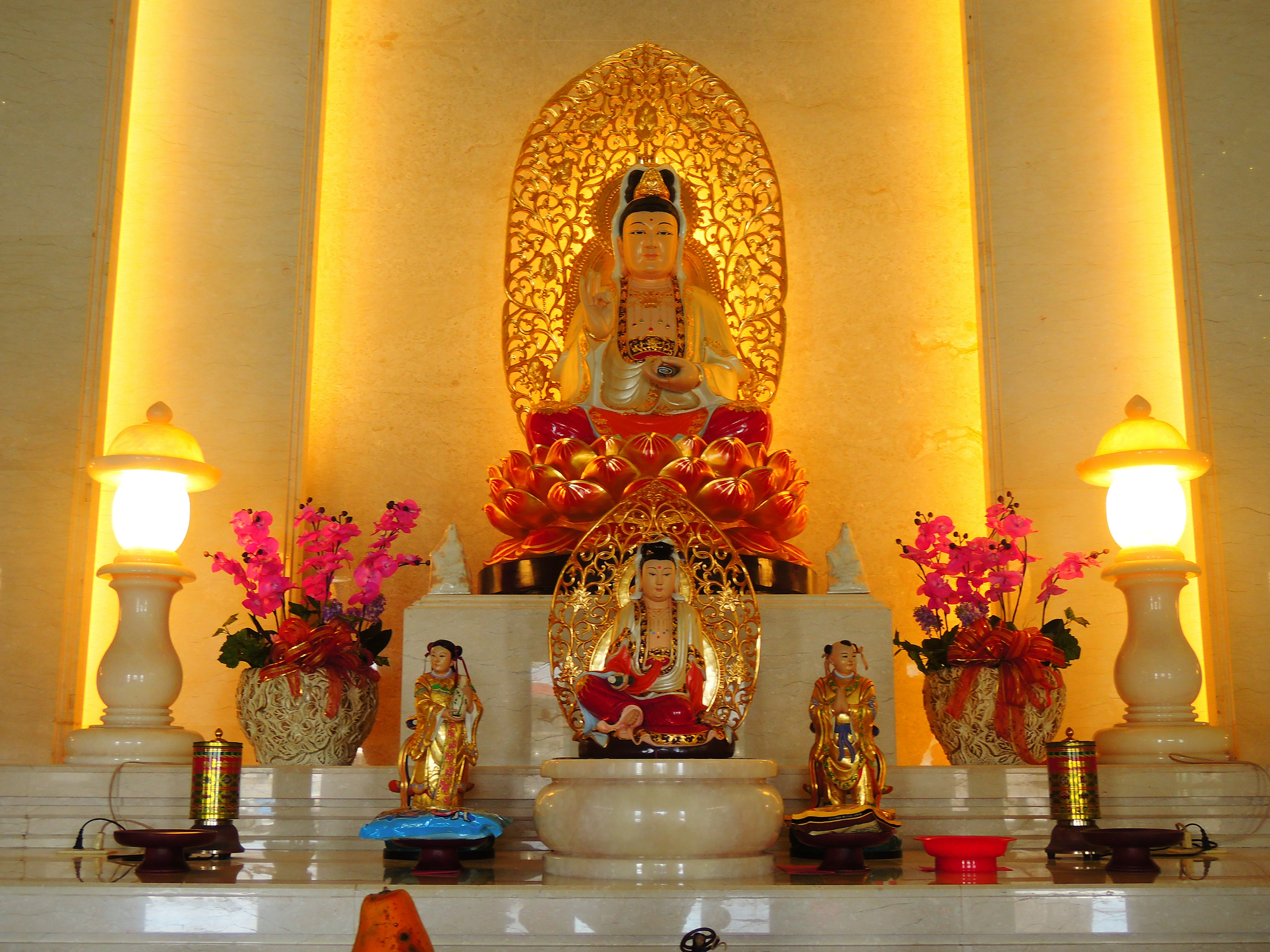
Statues of Guanyin Bodhisattva

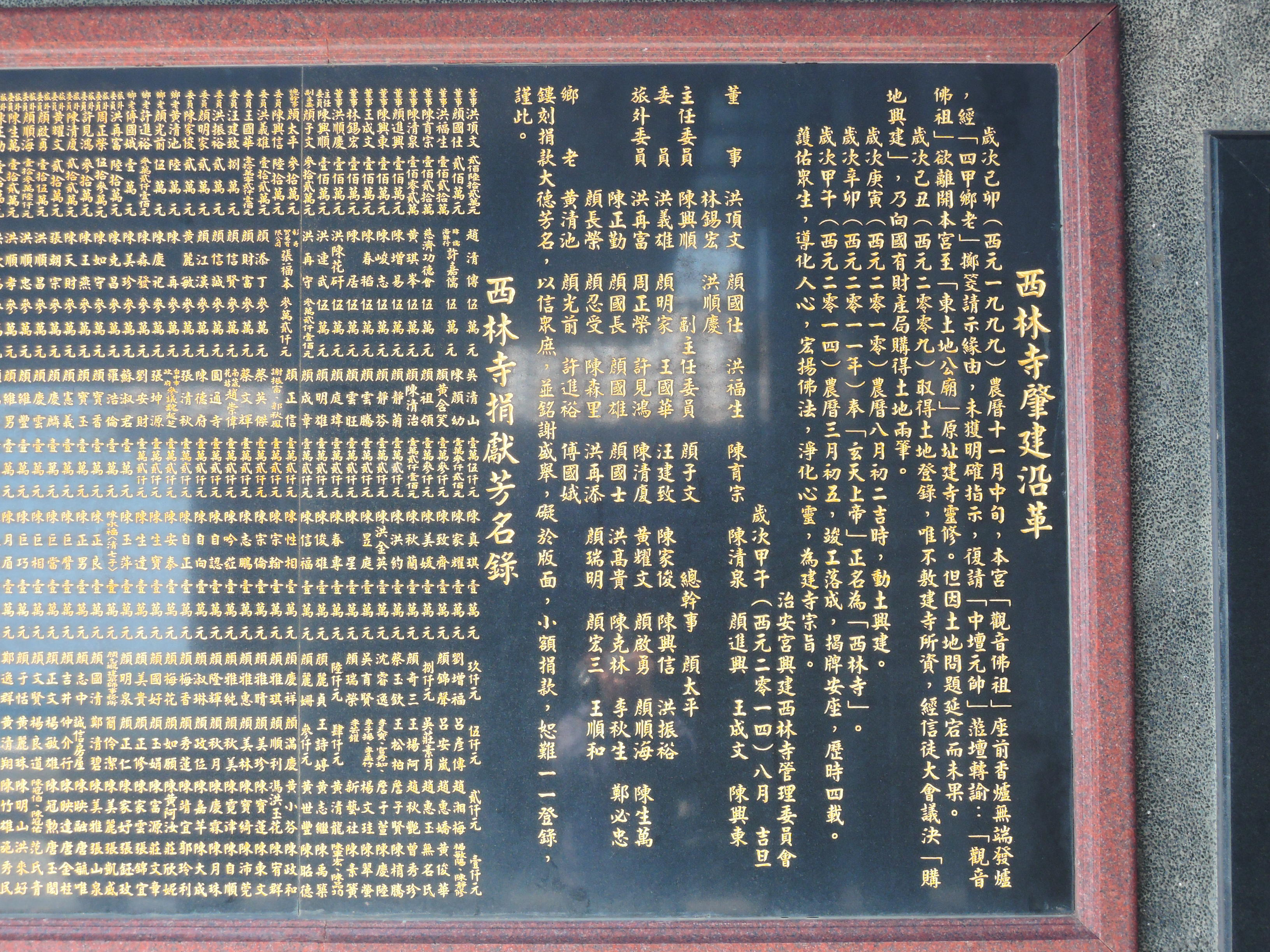
Inscription Commemorating the Completion of the Silin Temple (Erected in 2014)

== See also ==
- Dachi Zhi’an Temple （大池治安宮）
- Penghu Guanyin Temple （澎湖觀音亭）
- Chengyuan Tang Temple （澄源堂）
