= Penghu Guanyin Temple =

Buddhist temple in Taiwan

Coordinates: 23°34′03.7″N 119°33′43.0″E

Guan Yin Ting
- 澎湖觀音亭
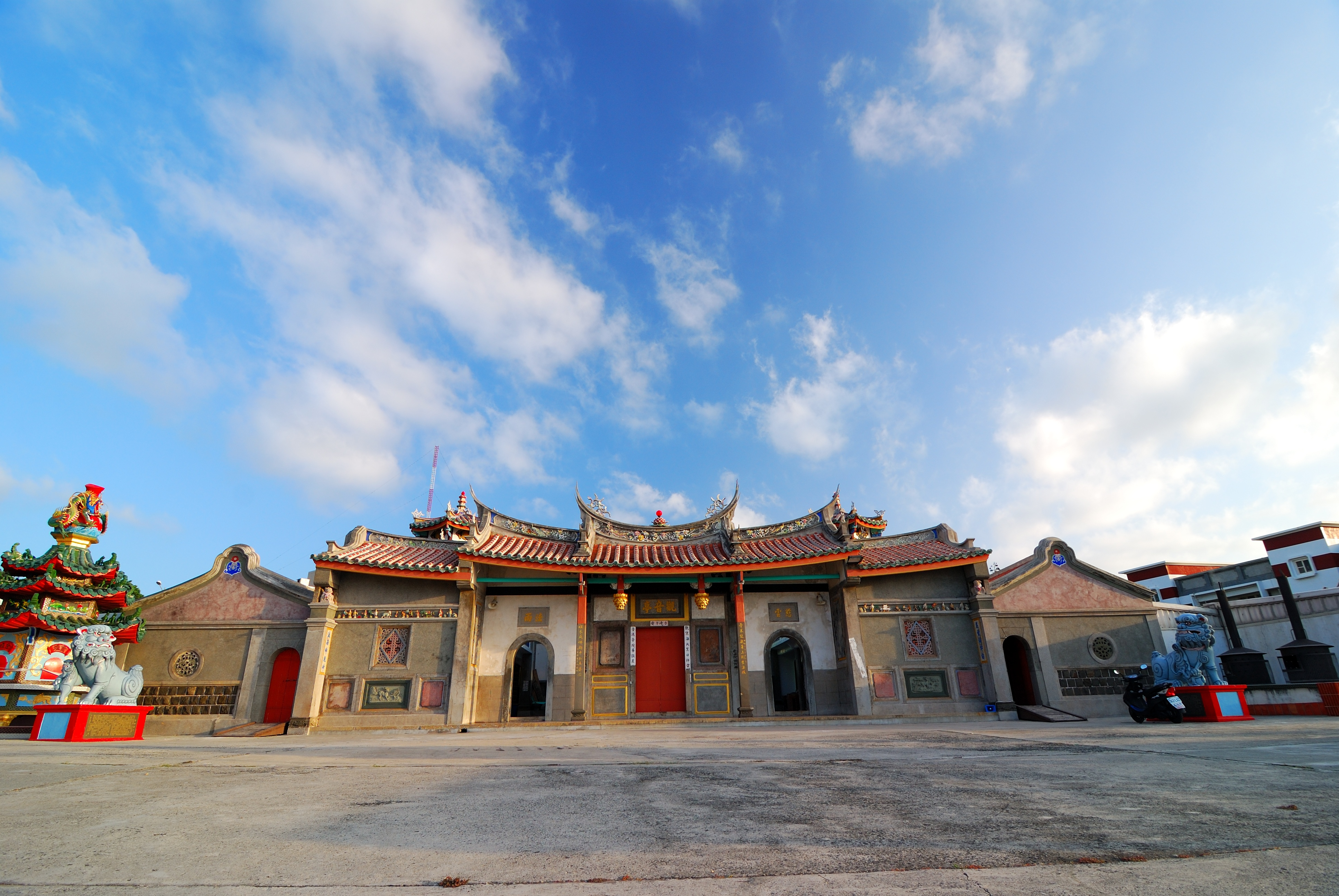
- The Front of Temple (The Pavilion of Guanyin)

Religion
- Affiliation: Buddhism

Location
- Location: Magong, Penghu, Taiwan 澎湖縣馬公市中興里介壽路7號 （媽宮北甲）
- Country: Taiwan
- Interactive map of Guan Yin Ting
- Administration: Penghu Guanyin Temple Management Committee

Architecture
- Founder: HSUE, Khui (薛奎)
- Completed: 1696

The Penghu Guanyin Temple (Chinese: 觀音亭, Taiwanese: Phînn-ôo Kuan-im-tîng, meaning "the pavilion of Guanyin") is a Buddhist temple, like other temples which belongs to the Integration of Buddhism and Taoism in Taiwan, Guanyin Temple does not only serve Guanyin (Buddhist God), but also Long-Wang. (or Dragon King, 龍王 in Chinese, a Taoist God, means the Lord of Sea Dragon.)

The present architectural form and layout date back to 1925, designed by Hsieh Chiang (謝江) and his son Hsieh Tsu-nan (謝自南).

Since 2003, Guan-Yin-Ting would gather thousands of visitors from everywhere for attending the Firework Festival from April to June, it is located at the noted touristic attraction, close to the beach area.

== History ==
=== Qing Empire ===
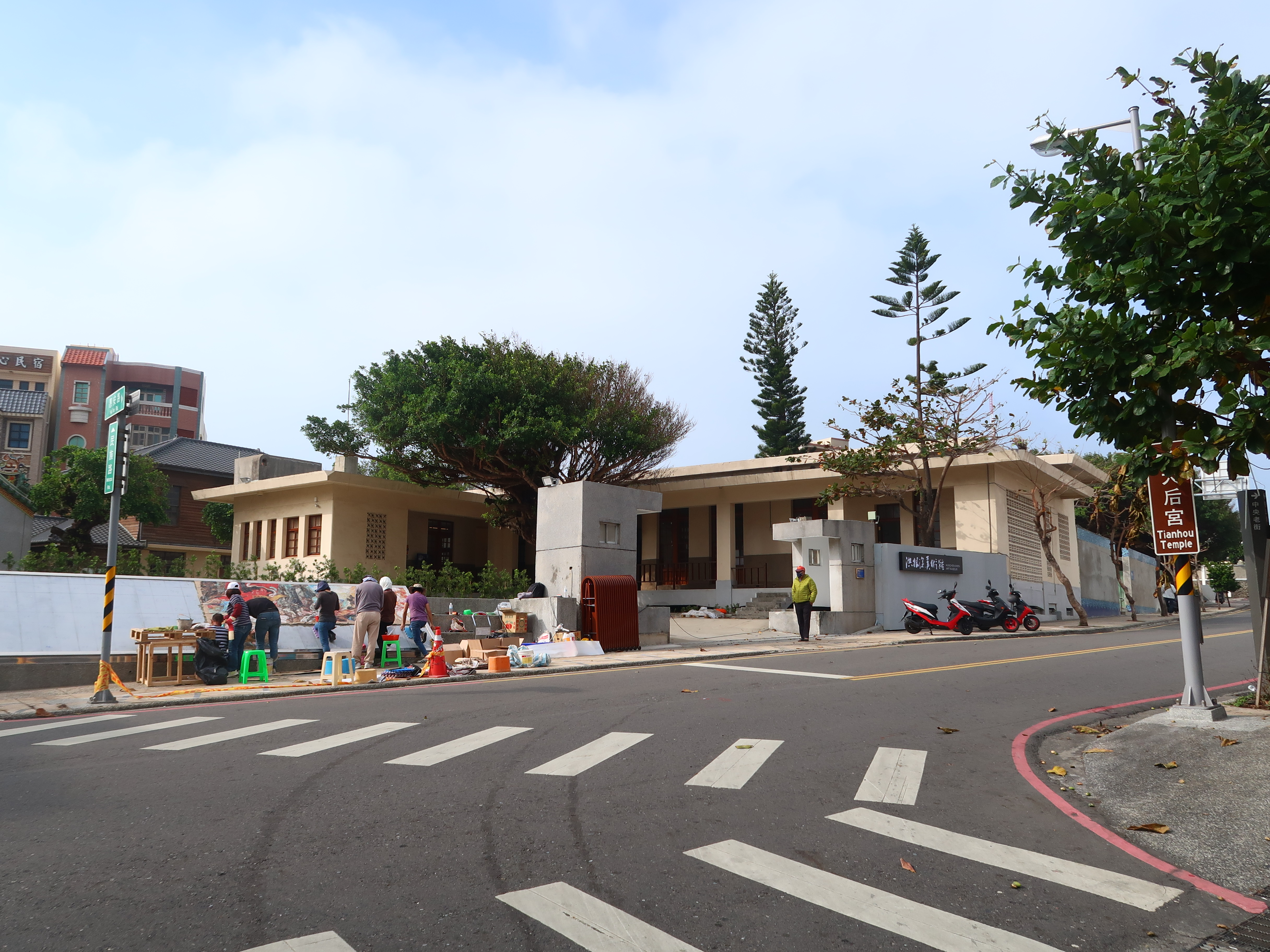
Located near the Penghu Mazu Temple, the Hung Keng Shen Art Museum occupies a building that once served as the Penghu Prefecture Military Police Office during the Japanese colonial period. After World War II, the ROC continued to use the building for official purposes until it was repurposed as the Hung Keng Shen Art Museum in 2020. Prior to the Japanese era, during the Qing Dynasty, the site was used as the administrative office of the Penghu Naval Garrison.

==== The reign of Emperor Kangxi ====
This temple was founded in 1696 during the Qing Empire by Hsue Khui (薛奎), Vice General (副將), a military officer of the Penghu Naval Garrison (澎湖水師協). This location holds a highly advantageous strategic position, capable of guarding Penghu main island while providing distant surveillance over Pescadores and Baisha Island. Historical records indicate that military forces were stationed here prior to the Dutch occupation of Taiwan in 1622. Subsequent regimes, including the Kingdom of Tungning (東寧王國) and the Qing Empire, inherited and maintained this military deployment.The establishment of the Guanyin Pavilion is thus profoundly connected to the Qing Empire's naval defense system in this region.

In 1683, Navy General Shi Lang (or Sego / Secoe, 施琅) defeated Naval Tungning fleet. He attributed his victory to the blessings of Mazu and also claimed that Guanyin boosted the morale of his soldiers. This reflects the Qing government's favorable attitude toward Guanyin worship.

==== The reign of Emperor Qianlong and Jiaqing ====
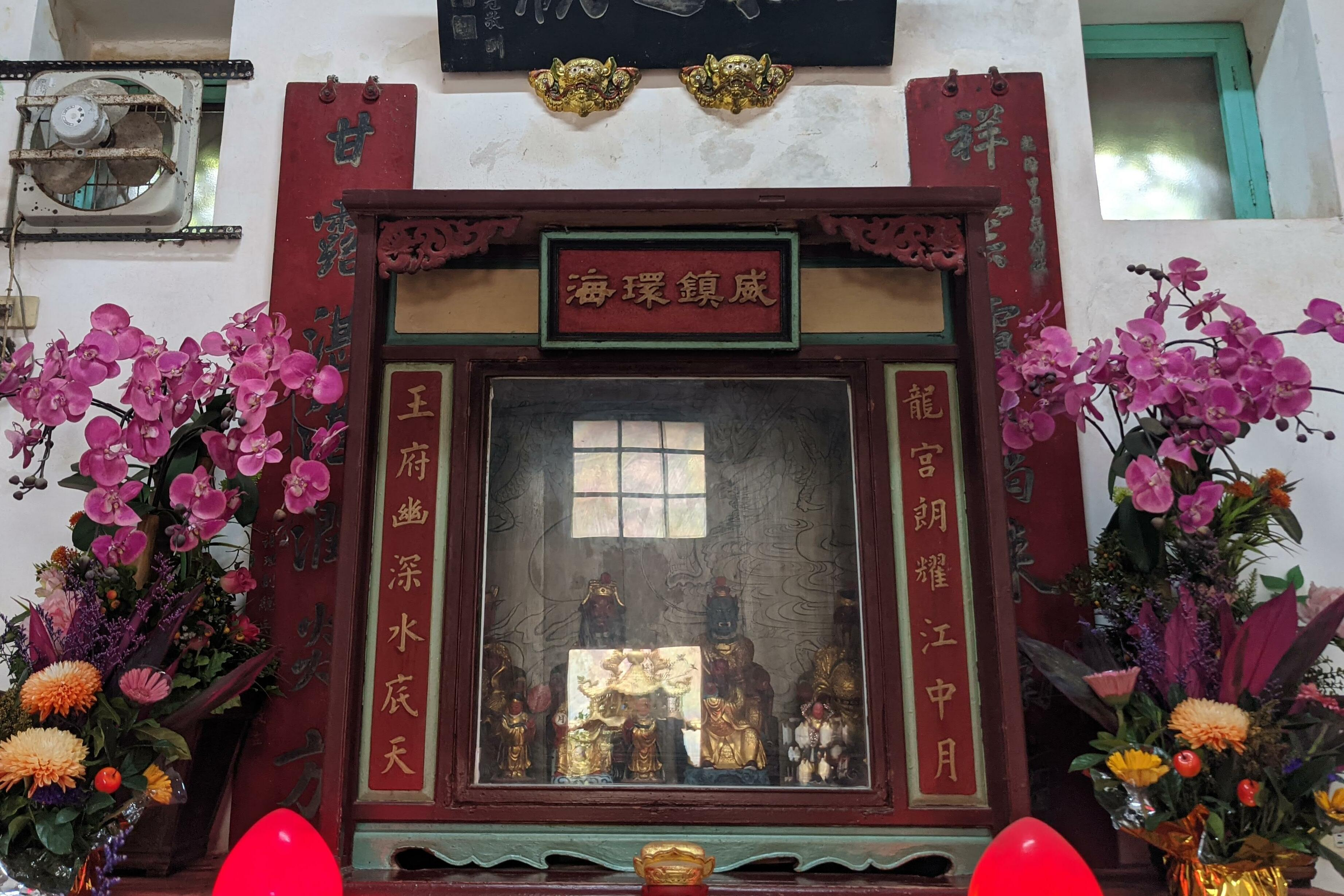
The pair of couplets was installed by Tai Fu in 1764.

In 1764, Tai Fu (戴福), the acting commander (Vice General) of the Penghu Naval Garrison, played a leading role in the renovation of Guanyin Temple. The couplet hanging on both sides of the altar in the temple's eastern wing, bearing an inscription written in Chinese calligraphy, was installed by Tai Fu during the 29th year of the Qianlong reign (1764). This pair of couplets is recognized as the oldest surviving artifact in Guanyin Temple.

In 1781, a major renovation of Guanyin Temple was undertaken, involving complete demolition and reconstruction, which resulted in the temple's second-generation architectural layout. The project was financially supported and led by Chen Chuan (陳銓), the magistrate of Penghu, with additional contributions from officers of the Penghu Naval Garrison, including Ma Chiao (馬蛟), Wen Ching (溫靖), and Wei Ta-pin (魏大斌).

In 1805, the 10th year of the Jiaqing reign, Penghu Naval Garrison officers such as Wang De-lu (王得祿), Chen Ching-hsing (陳景星), and Nie Shih-chun (聶世俊) initiated another round of fundraising to support the temple's restoration.

==== The reign of Emperor Daoguang ====
In 1826, the 6th year of the Daoguang reign, to express their gratitude to the Dragon King for granting safe voyages, Chiang Yung (蔣鏞), the magistrate of Penghu, together with Penghu Naval Garrison officers Sun Te-fa (孫得發), Huang Pu-ching (黃步青), and Lin Ting-fu (林廷福), advocated for public donations to construct the Dragon King Temple. The four rooms located on the east side of Penghu Guanyin Temple were demolished to make way for the construction of the Dragon King Temple. The Dragon King statue, which had previously been enshrined at Penghu Shuixian Temple and Penghu Mazu Temple, was relocated in the newly built Dragon King Temple.

==== The reign of Emperor Guangxu ====
In 1875, the first year of the Guangxu reign, Huang Hsueh-chou (黃學周), a tribute student at the time, took the lead in raising funds to rebuild the temple. According to the stele titled "Relocation of Wusheng Temple," which is still preserved at Penghu Wusheng Temple in Âng-mn̂g-siânn (紅毛城 / 紅木埕, a village in Magong City), Wu Chi-hsun (吳奇勳), then deputy commander of the Penghu Naval Garrison, also supported the project. In Lu Wen-hsin's (呂文鑫) research on Penghu temples and their architectural styles, he points out that the reconstruction and design were led by Yeh Ma-li (葉媽利), great-grandfather of Yeh Ken-chuang, from Âu-khut-thâm (後窟潭, a village in Magong City).

In 1884, the 10th year of the Guangxu reign, the Sino-French War eventually spread to northern Taiwan, including Keelung and Tamsui. The following year, on March 29, 1885 (Gregorian calendar), the Battle of Penghu broke out. French naval forces bombarded fortifications across Penghu. As Guanyin Temple was located within the military zone and stood near the Jinguitou Fortresst (金龜頭砲台), it did not escape the shelling. In addition, troops stationed in Magong at the time, including Cantonese and Zhejiang Taizhou soldiers, took advantage of the chaos to loot religious artifacts from temples.The looting incident was subtly recorded in "The Gazetteer of Penghu" (《澎湖廳志》), written by Lin Hao (林豪) in 1878. After the French forces occupied Penghu on March 31, 1885, further chaos unfolded around Guanyin Temple. Monks from the temple were reported to have sold Arhan statues to French soldiers, among other irregularities. The temple was left in a state of devastation.

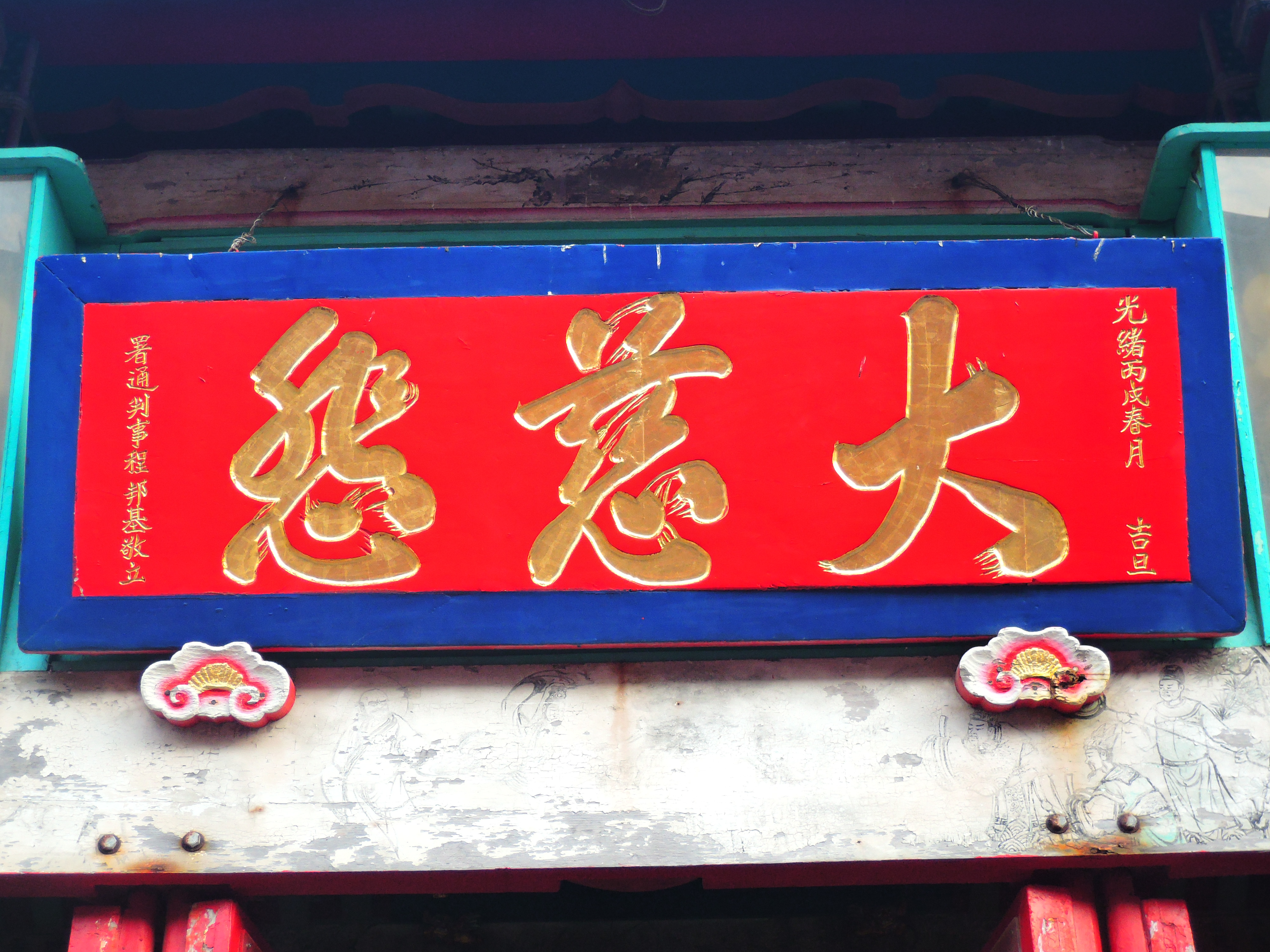
The inscribed board of “Great Compassion (大慈悲)”, presented by Cheng Pang-chi (程邦基) in 1886.

On June 9, 1885 (Gregorian calendar), France and the Qing Empire signed the Sino-French Treaty in Tianjin. French Navy withdrew entirely from Penghu on August 4, 1885. Shortly afterward, Cheng Pang-chi (程邦基) assumed office as the magistrate of Penghu and began overseeing the restoration of several temples, including the City God Temple of Magong and Penghu Guanyin Temple. The restoration of Guanyin Temple was completed in 1886, the 12th year of the Guangxu reign. In honor of the temple, Cheng Pang-chi presented a horizontal inscribed board bearing the phrase “Great Compassion” (大慈悲).

Once the Sino-French War was over, the Qing government took a fresh look at its southeastern coastal defenses and reorganized its naval forces. The Penghu Naval Garrison (澎湖水師協) was upgraded to the Penghu Naval Command (澎湖水師鎮), with the rank of its commanding officer raised from Vice General (副將, a subordinate second-rank position) to General (總兵, a full second-rank position). A record from 1891 shows that Wu Hung-lo (吳宏洛), the first appointed General of the Penghu Naval Command, personally donated 500 taels of silver toward the restoration of Guanyin Temple.

=== Empire of Japan ===
In 1894 (the 20th year of the Guangxu reign), the First Sino-Japanese War broke out between the Qing Empire and the Empire of Japan over the Korean Peninsula. The Qing troops suffered defeat in the war. After several rounds of negotiations, the two sides signed the Treaty of Shimonoseki on April 17, 1895 (21st year of Guangxu, also 28th year of Meiji), officially ending the war. Among the treaty terms was the cession of Taiwan and the Penghu Islands to Japan. On May 8 of the same year, both parties exchanged ratified copies of the treaty in Yantai, Shandong. From that day forward, all Qing officials withdrew from Taiwan and Penghu, and the Empire of Japan formally assumed sovereignty over both territories.

==== The early years of Japanese rule ====
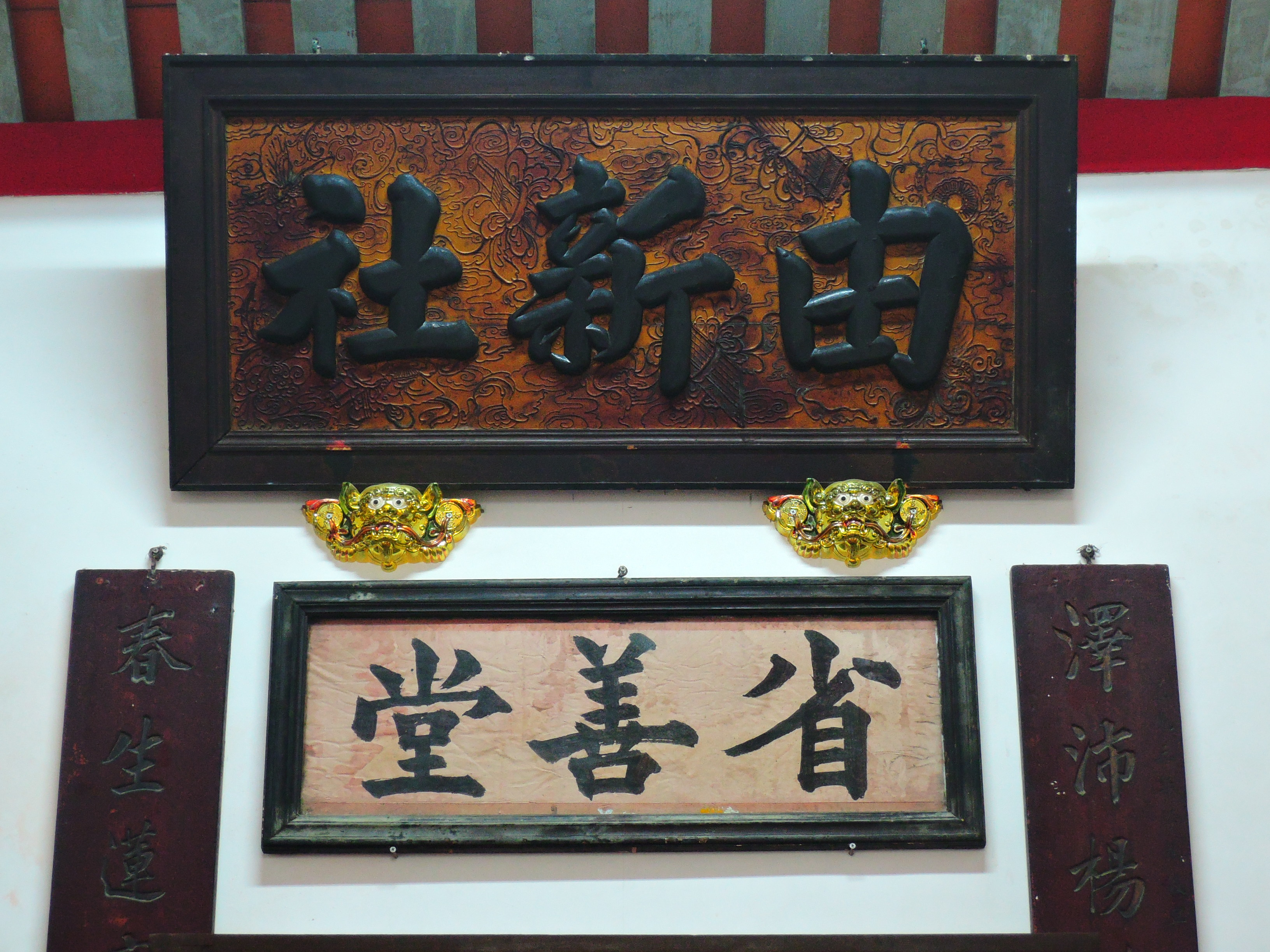
Calligraphy plaques from Iû-sin siā / Club (由新社, above) and Síng-siān tn̂g / Hall. ( 省善堂, below)

After the Empire of Japan took possession of Taiwan and the Penghu Islands, it promptly launched a comprehensive survey of local customs and traditions. As Japan was also a nation deeply rooted in Buddhism, Japanese Buddhist institutions were gradually introduced into Taiwan. In Penghu, the Rinzai school (臨済宗, Rinzai-shū) became the dominant sect. According to a government report from 1897 (Meiji 30), Guanyin Temple in Penghu was incorporated into the Myōshin-ji branch (Myōshin-ji-ha, 妙心寺派) of the Rinzai school, becoming a branch temple (bunji, 分寺) under Myōshin-ji (妙心寺), the head temple (daihonzan, 大本山) located in Kyoto. The temple was formally renamed in Japanese as “Hōkosan Kannon-ji” (澎湖山觀音寺), adopting a Japanese Buddhist title. During the Japanese colonial era, Guanyin Temple, backed by government support and set against a beautiful seaside backdrop, attracted worshipers from Japan and beyond, and quickly making a name for itself.

In the early years of Japanese rule, the government issued a ban on opium smoking. In response, the religious organization It-sin-siā (一新社) in Penghu promoted anti-opium campaigns through the Phoenix Hall Faith (鸞堂信仰), starting in 1901 (Meiji 34). Their efforts proved effective, and Phoenix Hall practices quickly gained popularity. In 1906 (Meiji 39), influenced by It-sin-siā, two key figures at Guanyin Temple, abbot Tsai Teh-hsiu (蔡德修) and Huang Yu-fu (黃有福), who established the Iû-sin-siā at Síng-siān-tn̂g (由新社省善堂) within the temple. Prominent local intellectuals, including Lin Chieh-ren (林介仁) and Hsu Chin-ying (許晉纓), both are Qing licentiates, also joined as members. Phoenix Hall activities at Guanyin Temple remained active throughout the Japanese colonial period. However, after World War II, the temple's management was transferred to the Penghu Buddhist Association (澎湖佛教會), and Phoenix Hall practices were suppressed and eventually came to a halt for a time.

==== Shōwa-Era Renovation ====
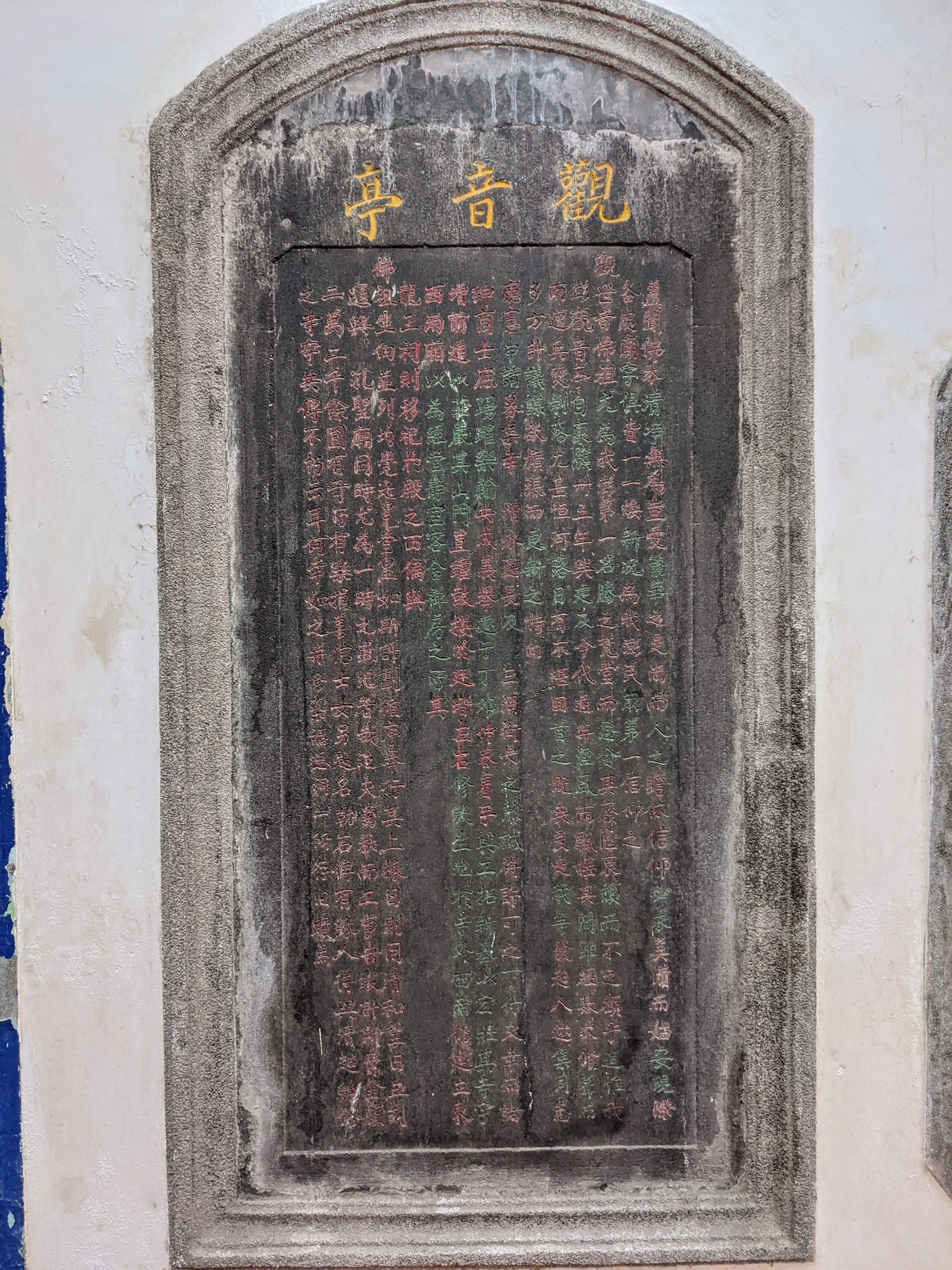
The renovation stele from 1927, Shōwa 3.

In August 1926 (Taishō 15), Guanyin Temple had fallen into disrepair due to age. An article titled “Renovating an Ancient Temple” published in the Taiwan Daily News reported that a local Penghu merchant, Chung Hung-chang (鍾紅樟), and others had applied for government permission to raise funds for its reconstruction. The fundraising campaign was planned to last for three years.

Reconstruction officially began in March 1927 (Shōwa 2), and by October of the same year, the renovation work was completed. During the completion ceremony, several Japanese officials attended the event, including Masanaga Kichijirō (増永吉次郎), then Magistrate of the Hōko Prefecture (澎湖廳長, in office from July 1926 to September 1928), Miura Mitsuji (三浦光次), Mayor of Makō (馬公街長, in office from October 1924 to July 1938), and Commander Iida (飯田) of the Imperial Japanese Navy.

During the renovation, the statues in Guanyin Temple were temporarily relocated and enshrined at Hsiyan Buddhist Temple (西巖寺, 西巖 means western rocks) in Tship-á-uan (緝馬灣 / 䗩仔灣, means in bay of barnacles in Taiwanese), Seisho shō (西嶼庄); modern-day Chìma Village, Xiyu Township (西嶼鄉赤馬村).

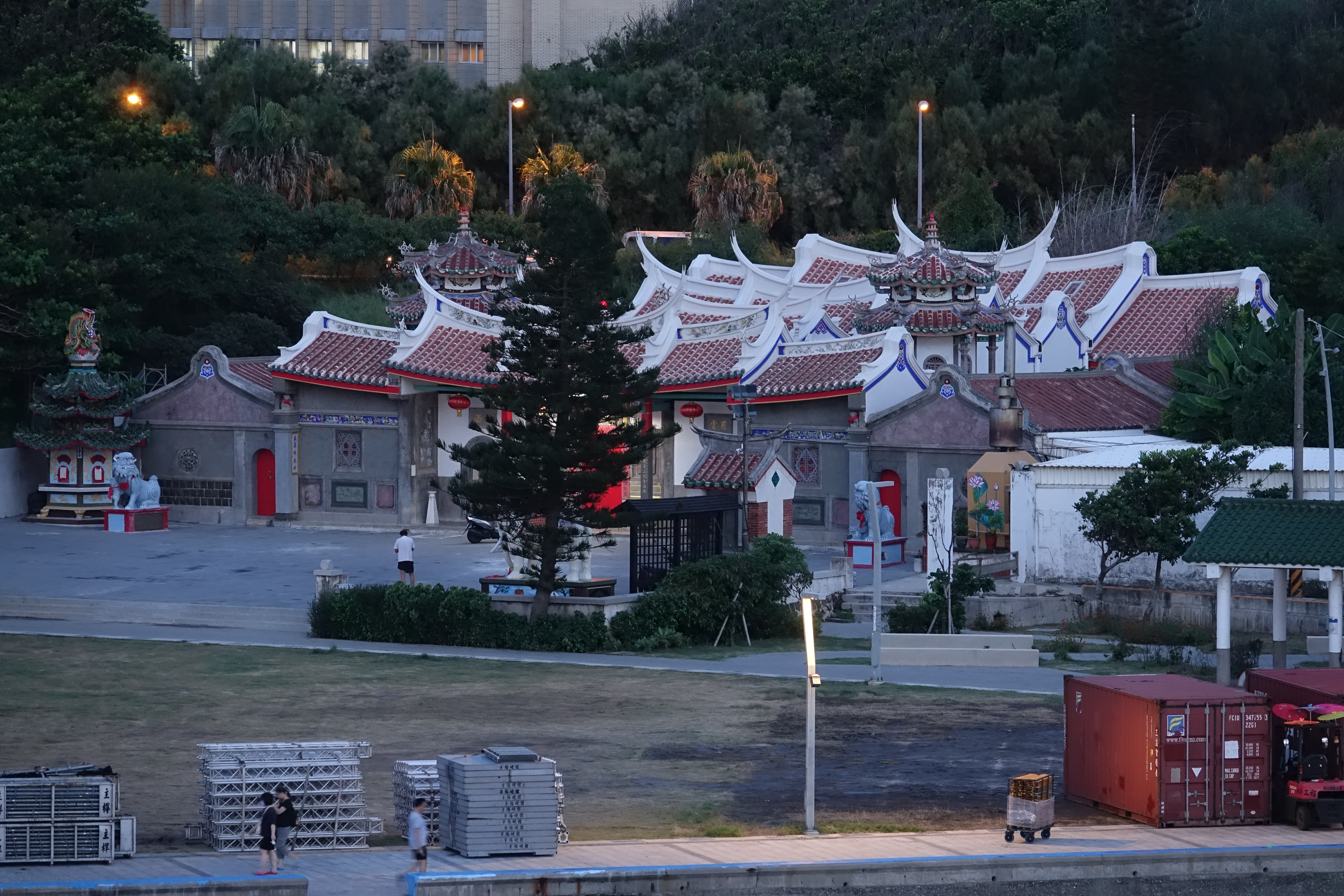
The present architectural form and layout of Penghu Guanyin Temple, photographed on July 4, 2023.

Penghu Guanyin Temple's current form and layout date back to the Shōwa-era renovation, which was designed by Hsieh Chiang (謝江) and his son, Hsieh Tsu-nan (謝自南). As a side note, Hsieh Chiang was also a native of Âu-khut-thâm (後窟潭). His mentor, Yeh Ma-li (葉媽利), had previously overseen the 1875 renovation project of Guanyin Temple in Penghu.

The renovation project drew widespread support, as the temple had held official status during the Qing Emire as the “Official Temple of All Penghu”. Funding for the reconstruction came primarily from donations by male and female devotees across all 51 villages in the archipelago. Among them, villages in Seisho shō (西嶼庄) contributed the largest amounts, Tship-á-uan (緝馬灣), Lāi-uann (內垵), Guā-uann (外垵), Sió-tî-kak (小池角), and Hsiyan Buddhist Temple (西巖寺) ranked as the top five donors, and all of these locations are within Seisho shō (Morden-day Xiyu Township, or Pescadores).

This pattern not only reflects the deep religious devotion of the Pescadores villagers, but also highlights the closer relationship between Pescadores and the Magong Harbor area during the Qing dynasty and Japanese colonial period, one that was notably stronger than what exists today.

==== Guanyin Temple Under Air Raid ====
From 1944 to 1945 (Shōwa 19–20), during the final years of the Pacific War, Penghu was drawn into the conflict and came under aerial bombardment by American forces. The Magong harbor area, including Guanyin Temple and its surroundings, was not spared from the attacks.

To protect sacred artifacts from the bombings, several temples near Magong Harbor, such as Guanyin Temple and Nanjia Hailing Temple (南甲海靈殿), relocated their statues to safer locations in the countryside. The deities from Guanyin Temple were temporarily enshrined at Âng-nâ-tà Buddhist Temple (紅羅罩開蠻寺), present-day Hongluo Village in Huxi Township (湖西鄉紅羅村). The statues were returned to Guanyin Temple only after the end of World War II.

Additionally, during the Japanese colonial period, Penghu Guanyin Temple was officially registered under the address “ 946 Makō, Makō kai, Hōko chō.” (澎湖庁馬公街馬公946番地)

=== Republic of China Period ===
The Era of Master Kuang-tz’u

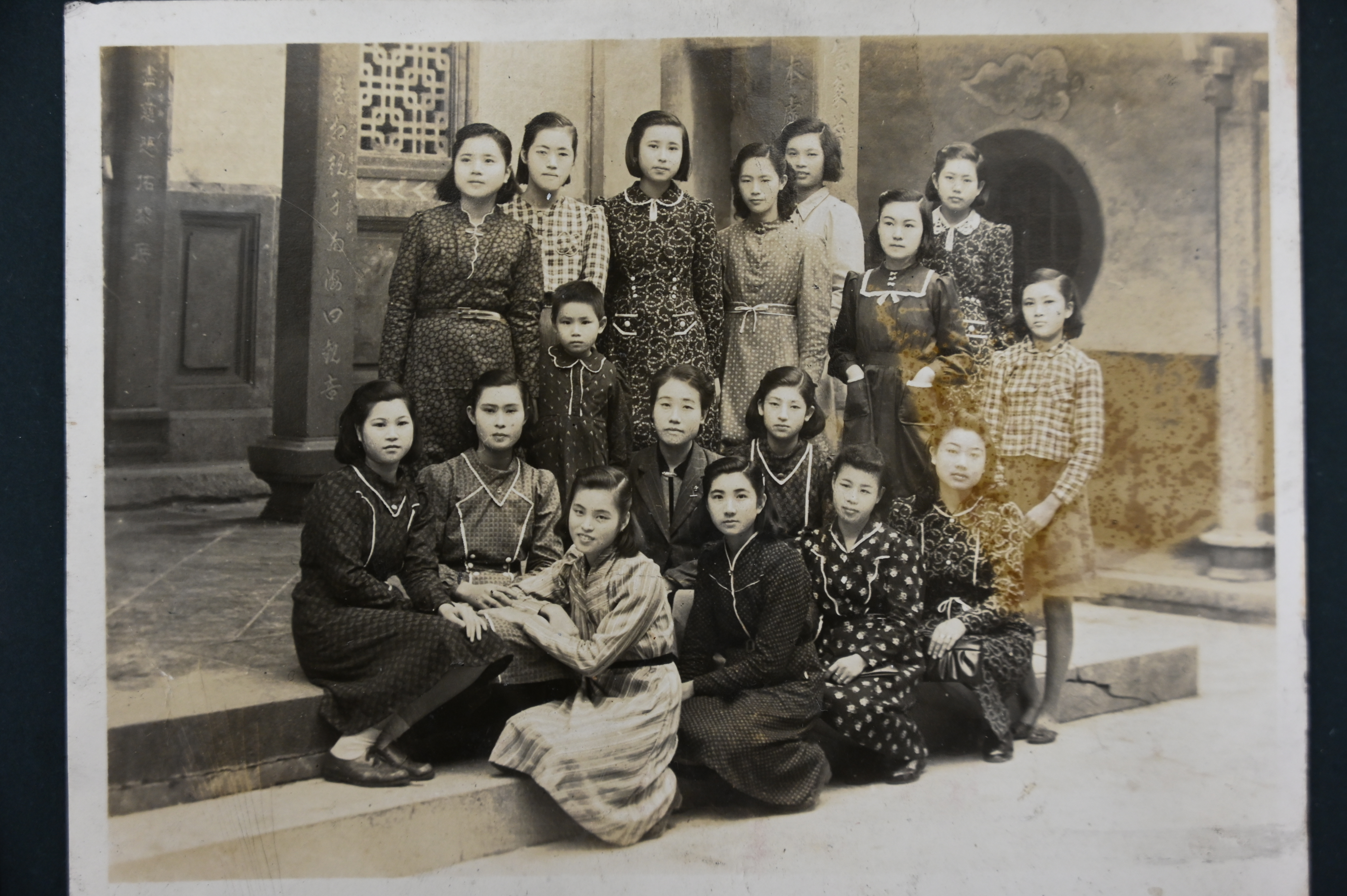
This photo shows the courtyard of Penghu Guanyin Temple in the 1950s.

In 1945, World War II came to an end, and Japan announced its surrender on August 15. In October of the same year, the Republic of China took over Taiwan and the Penghu Islands. This marked the beginning of the Republic of China period for the region.

In 1949 (Year 38 of the Republic of China), following the Kuomintang's defeat in the Chinese Civil War, a large influx of officials, soldiers, military dependents, and refugees arrived in Taiwan from mainland China. Due to a severe shortage of military housing, many military units were stationed in temples, private residences, and ancestral halls across the island, Penghu Guanyin Temple was no exception.

During this period, Northern-style Buddhist organizations such as the Buddhist Association of China (中國佛教會) began to assert influence over Taiwan's Buddhist community. Around 1950, Master Kuang-tz’u (廣慈法師), who came from Nanjing, arrived at Penghu Guanyin Temple and subsequently assumed responsibility for its management.

In 1953, the Penghu Branch of the Taiwan Provincial Buddhist Association, also known as the Penghu Buddhist Association (澎湖佛教會), was founded at Penghu Guanyin Temple, with Master Kuang-tz’u as its first chairman. Acting under the name of the Penghu Buddhist Association, Master Kuang-tz’u organized numerous blessing ceremonies and charitable events, including rice distributions for the poor. He earned widespread respect from both local officials and residents. During this period, Guanyin Temple became a vital center of Buddhist faith in Penghu.

In 1959, the same year the renovated Guanyin Temple was completed, Master Kuang-tz’u founded "Right Faith Kindergarten" (Cheng-hsin Kindergarten, 正信幼稚園) in October through large-scale fundraising efforts. However, serious disputes later arose between him and the board of directors over issues of management and property ownership.

In 1960, Penghu County Councilor Hsu Chi-sheng (許紀盛) raised inquiries regarding the management systems of the "three major public temples of Penghu" (Including of Guanyin Temple, Penghu Mazu Temple, and Magong City God Temple), and specifically urged the county government to investigate the financial accounts of Guanyin Temple. Although the matter ultimately ended without resolution, it significantly damaged the reputation of the Penghu Buddhist Association. Criticism had already been mounting over the fact that Master Kuang-tz’u, who had long served as chairman, had never organized leadership re-elections.

In 1962, Councilor Hsu Teng-chueh (許等爵) went a step further, demanding the dissolution of the Penghu Buddhist Association and calling for the County Education Department to reexamine the property rights of the Right Faith Kindergarten. Unable to resolve the growing conflict between the county council and the Buddhist Association, the Penghu County Government referred the matter to the Taiwan Provincial Government for arbitration. In response, the provincial authorities ruled that the Buddhist Association need not be dissolved but required a reorganization of its structure.

Although the Penghu Buddhist Association managed to avoid disbandment, its public standing steadily declined after the incident. By 1963, new Buddhist temples such as Hsin-yuan Temple (信願寺) and Chao-yin Temple (潮音寺) were established in the Magong area, attracting large numbers of followers. Eventually, Master Kuang-tz’u left Penghu amid allegations concerning his personal conduct, leaving Guanyin Temple leaderless and no longer the central hub of Buddhist faith in the region.

Revival of the Phoenix Hall Tradition

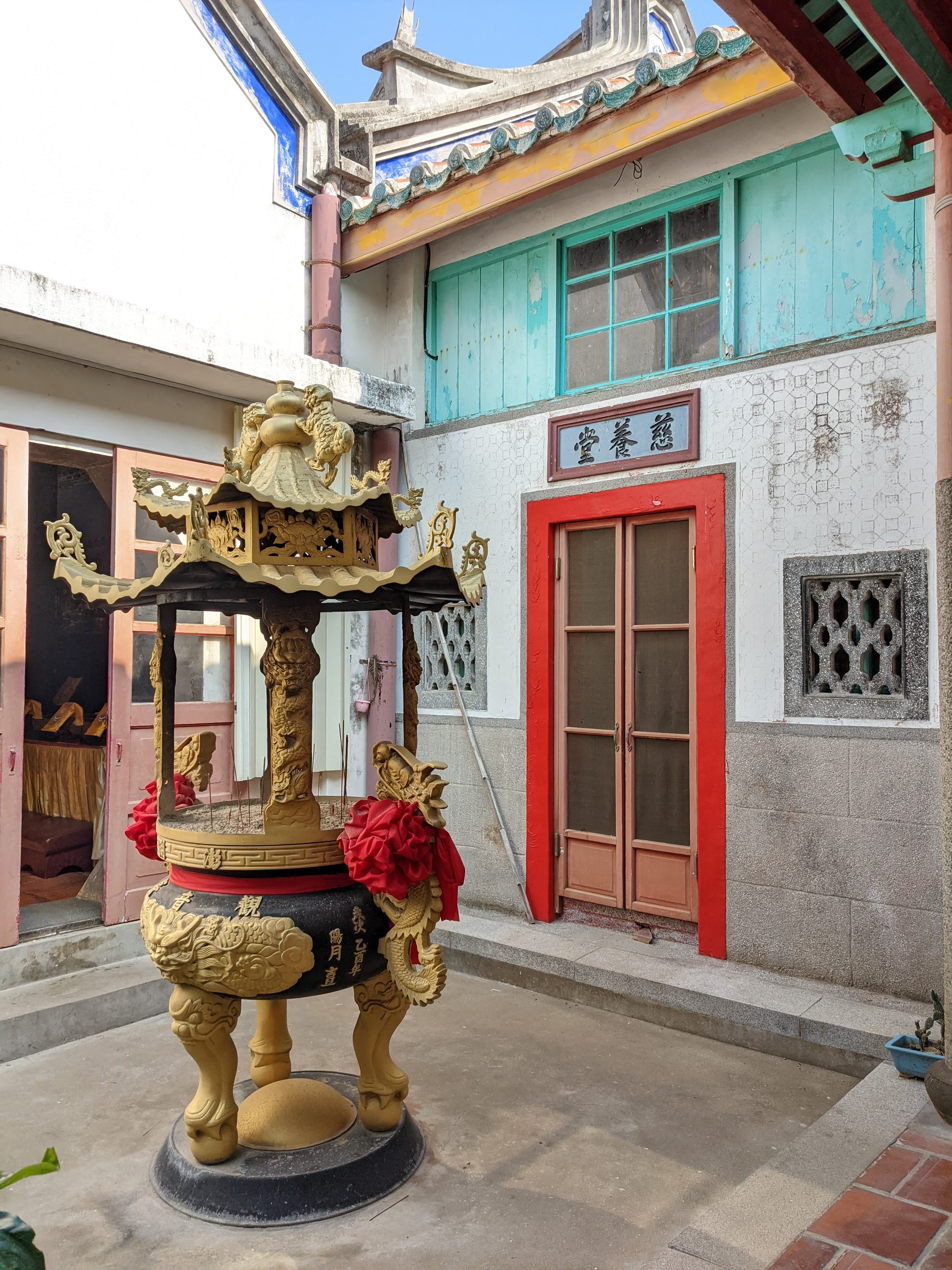
The west wing of Guanyin Temple, traditionally considered the left wing in Taiwanese architecture, was once used for Phoenix Hall gatherings.

After years of decline, some devotees of Guanyin Temple sought to revive the Phoenix Hall (鸞堂) tradition that had once flourished during the Japanese colonial period. In 1974, they first invited members of the Phoenix Hall at Penghu Sanguan Temple (澎湖三官殿) in Penghu to provide guidance. On August 21 of that year, the Iû-sin Club－Síng-siān Hall (由新社－省善堂) was reestablished at Guanyin Temple. Chen Ma-he (陳媽和) was appointed president of Iû-sin Club, and Kuo Chen-chia (郭成家) was named the hall master of Síng-siān Hall. Together, they promulgated a set of Ten Rules to serve as the formal code of conduct for the revived organization.

The three major public temples of Penghu are all located in the Magong Harbor area—commonly known as the Three Jia of Magong (媽宮三甲): East Jia (東甲), South Jia (南甲), and North Jia (北甲). Their close proximity often led to overlapping religious activities and mutual influence.

From 1982 to 1984, one of the three major public temples, Magong City God Temple held annual land processions (pilgrimage tours) for three consecutive years. In 1984, Penghu Mazu Temple organized a maritime pilgrimage for Mazu.

By 1986, a significant change occurred in the management structure of the three temples. Previously, the responsibility for temple administration rotated annually among the three Jia. That year, the system was formalized as follows: East Jia would manage Magong City God Temple, South Jia would manage Mazu Temple, and North Jia would oversee Guanyin Temple.

Desiring to organize a procession of their own, Guanyin Temple's key figures, Chen Ma-he (陳媽和) and Hsueh Kuang-tsan (薛光燦), proposed the idea of an “Aerial Procession for Guanyin Bodhisattva.” The proposal received official support from then Penghu County Mayor Ou Chien-chuang (歐堅壯) and Lieutenant General Mao Meng-yi (毛夢漪) of the Penghu Defense Command.

Penghu Guanyin Temple chartered three small aircraft from Yunghsing Airlines (永興航空) to carry the statues of Guanyin Bodhisattva on an aerial pilgrimage around the Penghu Islands. These aerial processions took place twice, in 1987 and 1988.

In 1989, the aerial tour expanded beyond Penghu. After completing a circular flight over the islands, the Guanyin statue was flown to Taiwan's main island. On July 10, it departed from Magong Airport and landed at Kaohsiung Siaogang Airport (KHH). The next day, on July 11, the aircraft departed from Kaohsiung and flew over Hengchun, Taitung, Hualien, Yilan, and Keelung, finally arriving at Taipei Songshan Airport at 2:33 PM. The statue was warmly welcomed by major temples such as Longshan Temple and Zhinan Temple in Taipei.

On July 12, the plane made its return journey along Taiwan's western corridor, flying over Hsinchu, Taichung, and Chiayi, before returning to Magong Airport in Penghu. On July 13, a vegetarian banquet and thanksgiving ritual.

After its revival, the club in the Phoenix Hall gained wide acclaim for organizing the aerial pilgrimage of Guanyin Bodhisattva. In addition to this unprecedented event, the Hall also published three books on Luan (鸞) belief and practices in 1979, 1980, and 1982. It regularly held sutra-chanting ceremonies and engaged in charity work to assist low-income households. However, as key members aged and died, the Phoenix Hall-related activities gradually declined. In 2009, following the death of its leading figure Chu Maolin (朱茂林), the Phoenix Hall practices at Penghu Guanyin Temple came to a complete halt.

=== The Era of the Management Committee ===
In response to evolving legal frameworks in Taiwan, many traditional temple organizations across the island gradually transitioned to modern governance structures, such as religious foundations or management committees. On December 27, 2014, Penghu Guanyin Temple officially established the Penghu Guanyin Temple Management Committee, with Wang Shun-Hui (王順輝) appointed as the first chairperson, and Lin Song-Te (林松德) as the Vice Chairperson.

== Architecture ==
With a long-standing history dating back to the Qing Empire, the structure of Penghu Guanyin Temple has undergone four major transformations, summarized in the table below.

Architectural History of Penghu Guanyin Temple
Temple Phase	Year Built	Key figures	Renovation Years	Notes
First Generation	1696 (Kangxi 35)	Hsue Khui (薛奎)	1764 (Qianlong 29)	
Second Generation	1781 (Qianlong 46)	Chen Chuan (陳詮)	1805 (Jiaqing 10); 1826 (Daoguang 6)	During the Daoguang reign, Chiang Yung (蔣鏞) dismantled the east wing and added the Dragon King Temple (Longwang Temple).
Third Generation	1875 (Guangxu 1)	Huang Hsueh-chou (黃學周)	1886 (Guangxu 12); 1891 (Guangxu 17)	Designed by Yeh Ma-li (葉媽利).
Fourth Generation (current structure)	1925 (Taisho 14)	Chung Hung-chang (鍾紅樟)	1957 (ROC 46); 2003 (ROC 92)	Designed by Hsieh Chiang (謝江) and Hsieh Tsu-nan (謝自南).; The Dragon King Temple was reintegrated into the Guanyin Temple.

The current architectural appearance of Penghu Guanyin Temple was established in 1927 (Shōwa 2 of the Japanese colonial period), based on a design and construction by master carpenters Hsieh Chiang (謝江) and his son Hsieh Tzu-nan (謝自南), who hailed from Âu-khut-thâm (後窟潭, present-day Chongguang Village, Magong City). The main structure follows a “two-hall, five-bay” layout, with a nearly square floor plan. Flanking the central structure are one wing on each side, expanding the layout to a “two-hall, seven-bay” configuration. The connecting corridors serve both as protective wings and as covered walkways. Behind each wing stands a bell or drum tower, a highly novel and rare architectural feature in Taiwan at that time.

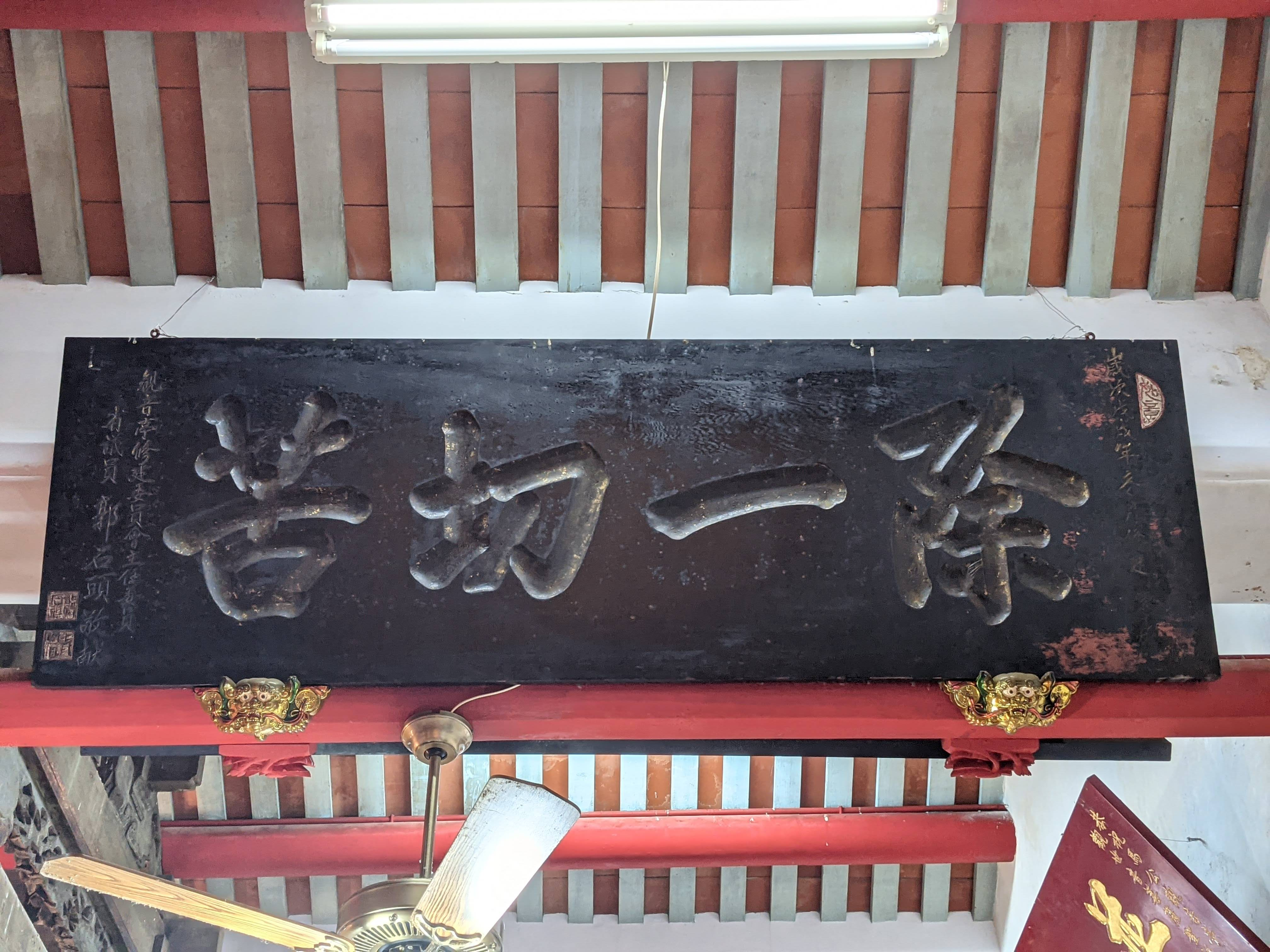
The inscribed with “Eliminating All Suffering” (除一切苦), a Buddhist expression, was respectfully donated by Kuo Shih-tou (郭石頭).

After the end of World War II in 1945, many temples and residential buildings across Penghu remained damaged by wartime destruction. While local residents hoped to restore their community temples, postwar financial hardship made such efforts difficult. Meanwhile, the Taiwan Provincial Government of the Republic of China viewed temple-building as a superstitious practice rooted in the worship of divine authority and sought to suppress it, offering no support for the reconstruction of religious sites. As a result, Penghu Guanyin Temple remained in a dilapidated state for some time. It was not until 1957 that a group of local figures—Kuo Shih-tou (郭石頭), Pao Wu (鮑霧), Tsai Chen (蔡陣), Hsu Teng-chueh (許等爵), and Hsieh Keng-yin (薛庚寅), who came forward to first overcome political barriers and then organize the “Magong 3 jia Citizens' Committee for the Reconstruction of Guanyin Temple.” By mobilizing donations from 38 villages in Penghu County, they successfully launched the first postwar renovation project, which was completed on May 19, 1959.

On November 27, 1985, Penghu Guanyin Temple was registered by the Ministry of the Interior as a “Grade III Historic Site.” In 1996, following amendments to the Cultural Heritage Preservation Act, it was reclassified as a "County-Level Monument", with oversight transferred to the Cultural Affairs Bureau of the Penghu County Government.

=== Layout ===
The architectural layout of Guanyin Temple follows the traditional pattern of "backing the mountain and facing the water", in this case, the Penghu Inner Sea. The temple's front façade features five bays flanked by two side wings. The width proportions of the main gate follow a 1.36 : 1 : 1.39 ratio for the central, sub, and side bays, respectively. The roof ridge is divided into five segments. While the main and sub bays appear separated by roof beams visually, they actually share a continuous roof ridge structurally.

The main structure features a three-bay open roof design, with the two side wings directly attached to the central building. The walls of the side wings are built in a “horseback” shape (curved gables). Viewed from the forecourt, the temple presents a symmetrical appearance, with a prominent bell tower on the west and drum tower on the east, creating a harmonious composition.

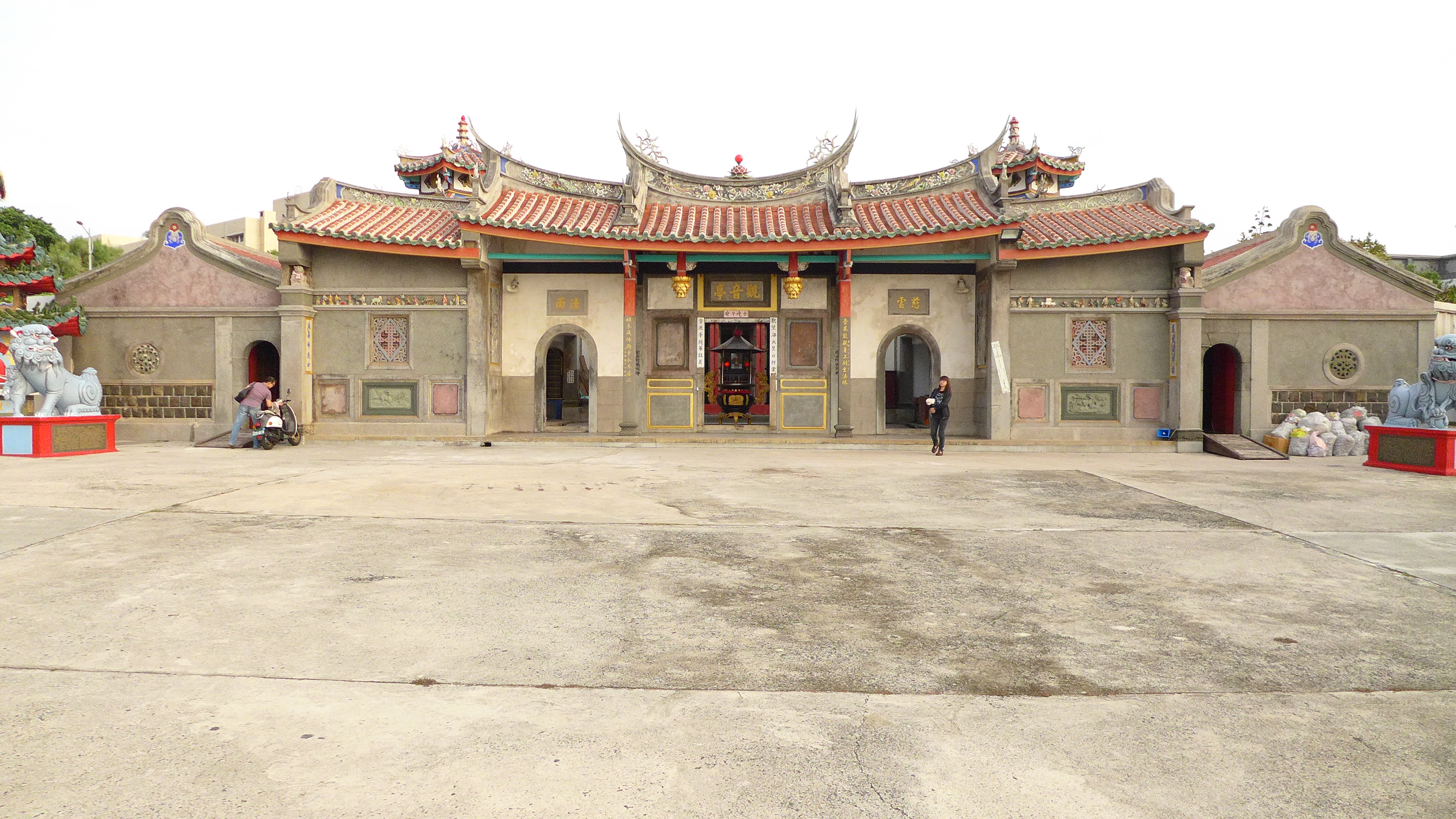
Front view of Guanyin Temple

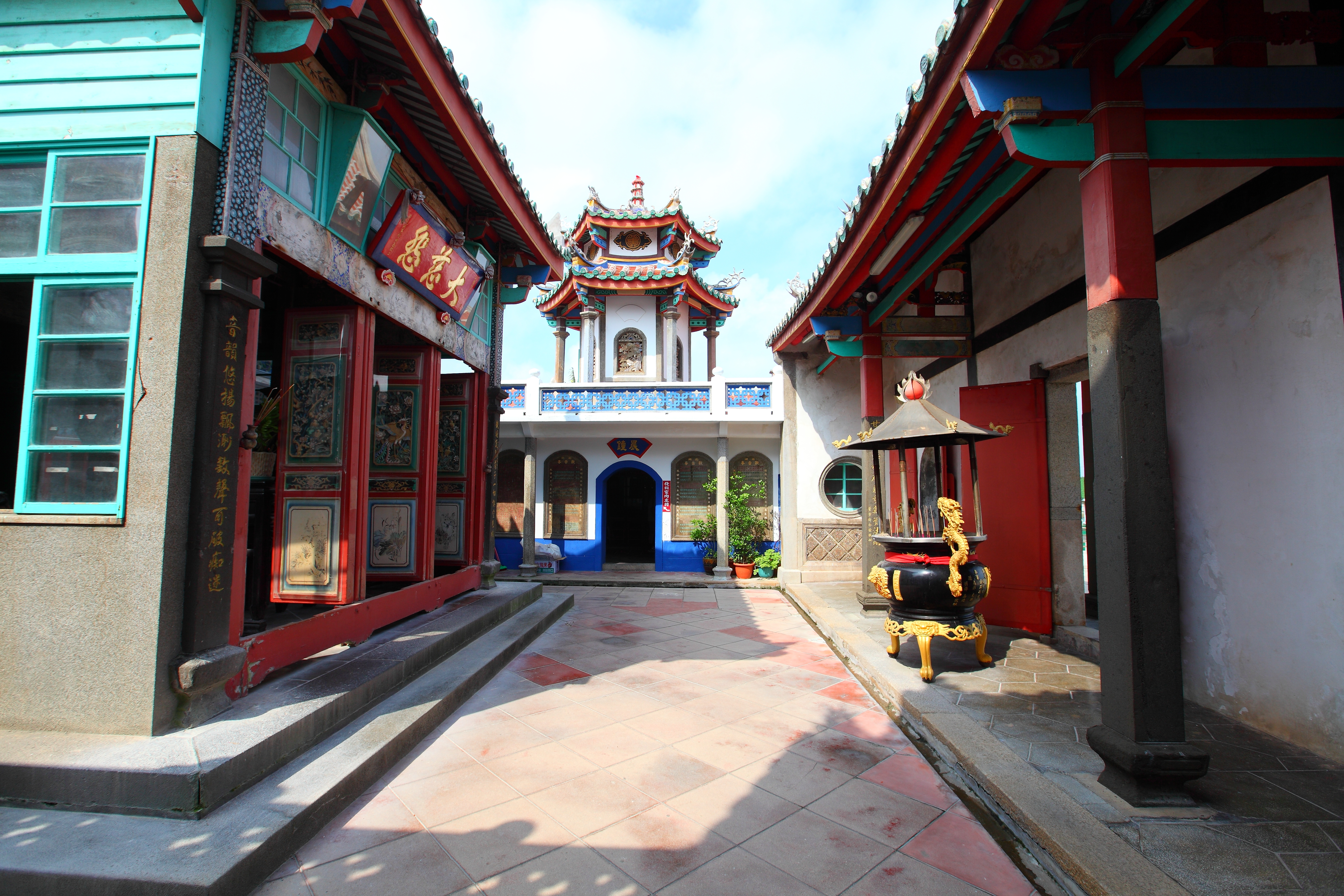
The bell tower in the west inner side.

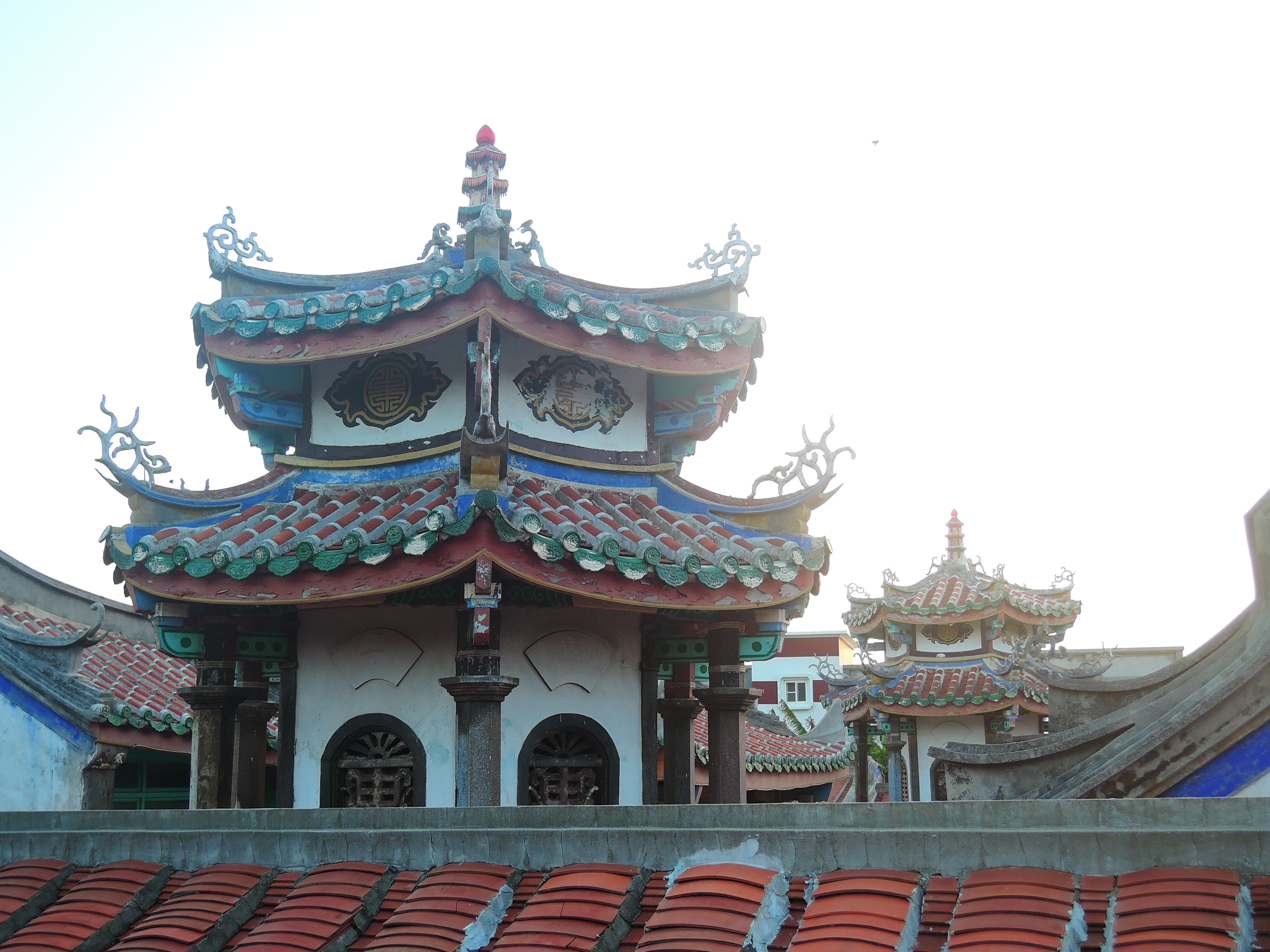
The drum tower (foreground) and the bell tower (background).

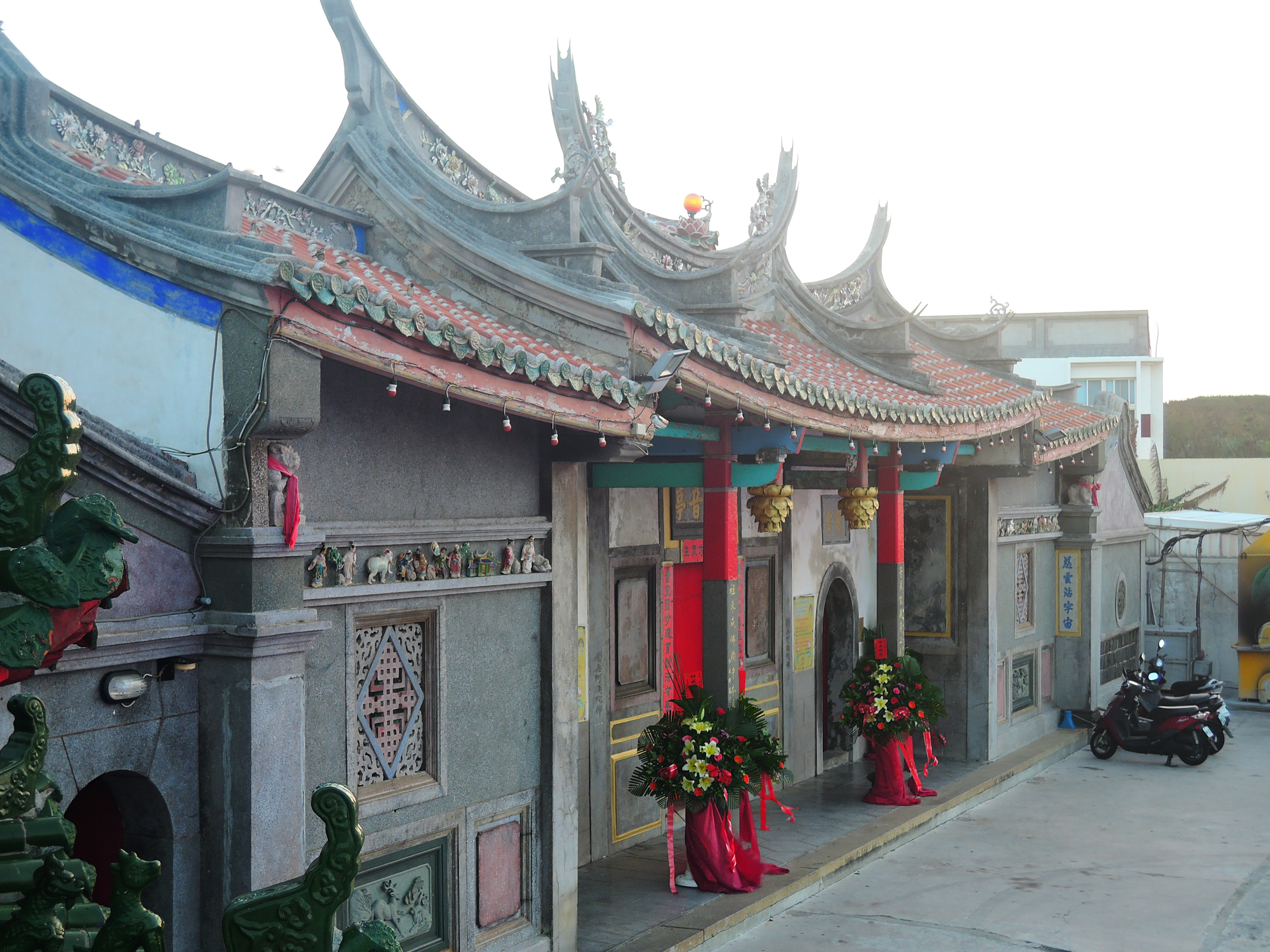
A ridgeline featuring a swallowtail design, seamlessly integrated with continuous eaves and wall surfaces.

=== Male and Female Stone Lions ===
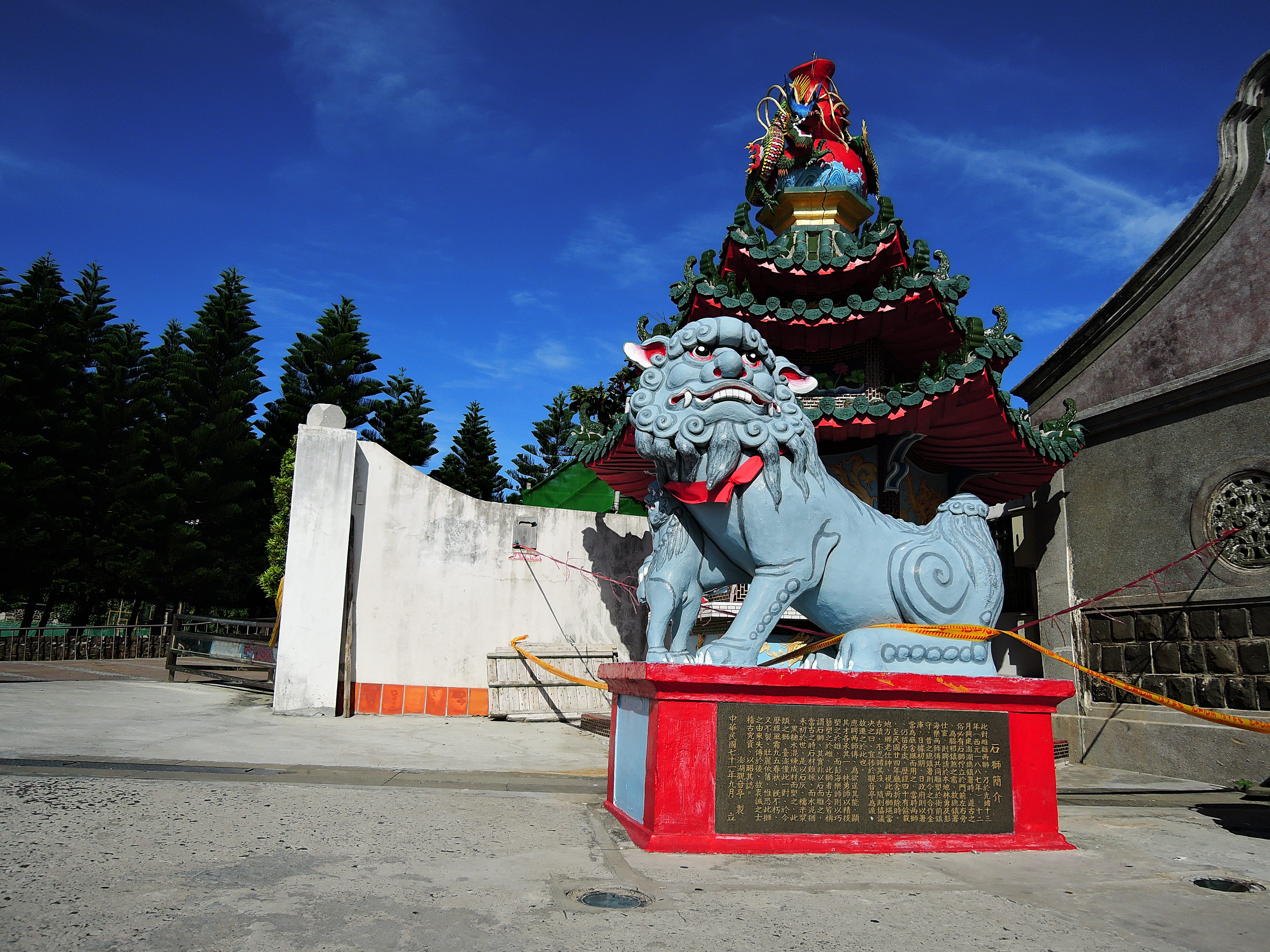
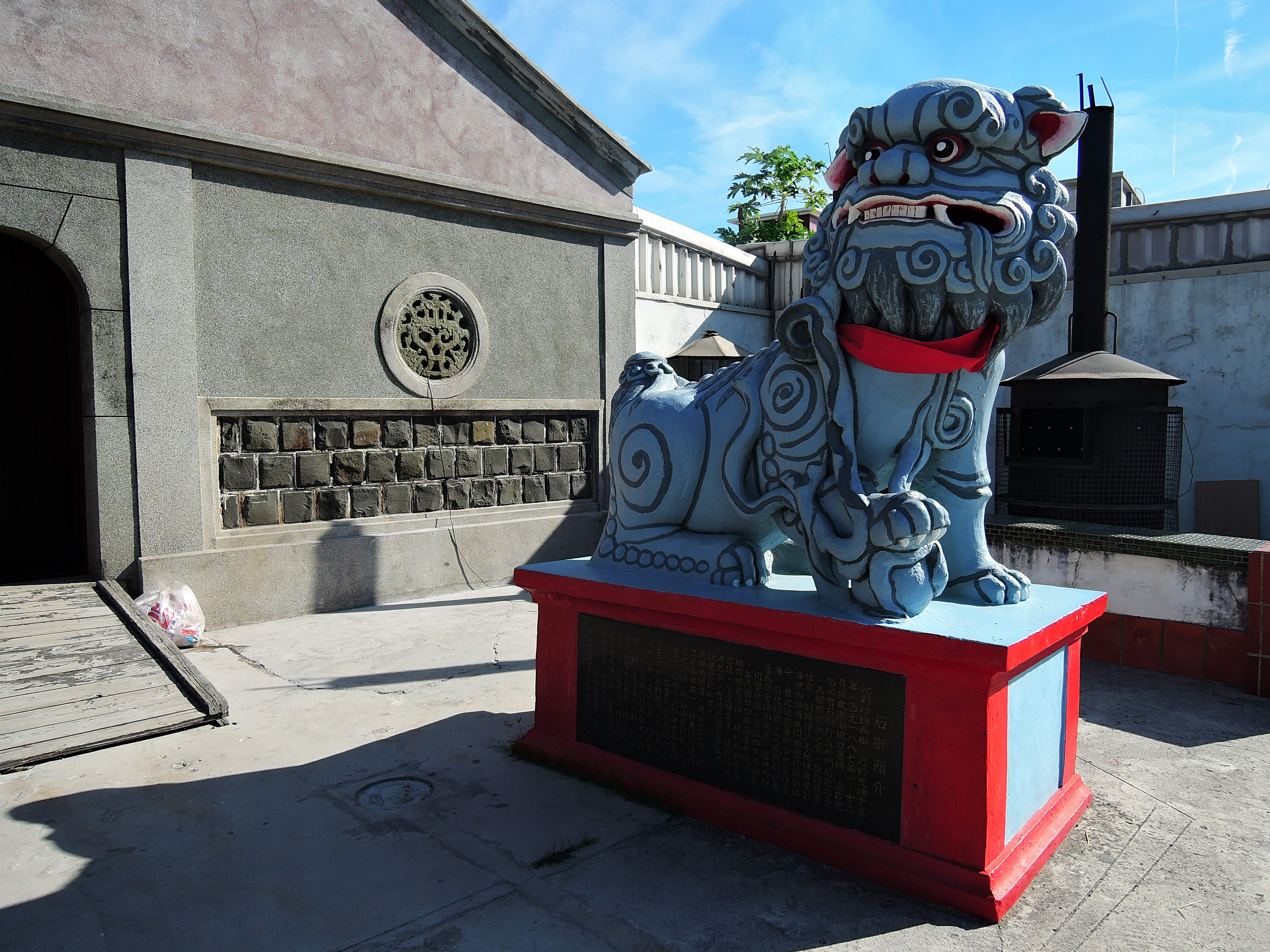
The two male and female stone lion statues standing in front of the Penghu Guanyin Temple.

Two guardian lions, one male and one female, now stand in the plaza of Penghu Guanyin Temple. Made of grey plaster mixed with glutinous rice paste, they originally stood in front of the Qing-era the administrative office of the Penghu Naval Garrison, completed in 1887. The Penghu Naval Headquarters was completed in 1887. After the Japanese takeover in 1895, the building served as the first Hōko Prefecture Hall (Penghu County Hall).

By the 1930s, the original hall constructed mainly of wood, it had become dilapidated. The Japanese government decided to build a new office at a different site. The second-generation Hōko Prefecture Hall was completed on December 31, 1934, and officially opened on February 11, 1935. The pair of guardian lions from the old naval office was relocated to the front of Penghu Guanyin Temple in 1937 (Shōwa 12).

== Gallery ==
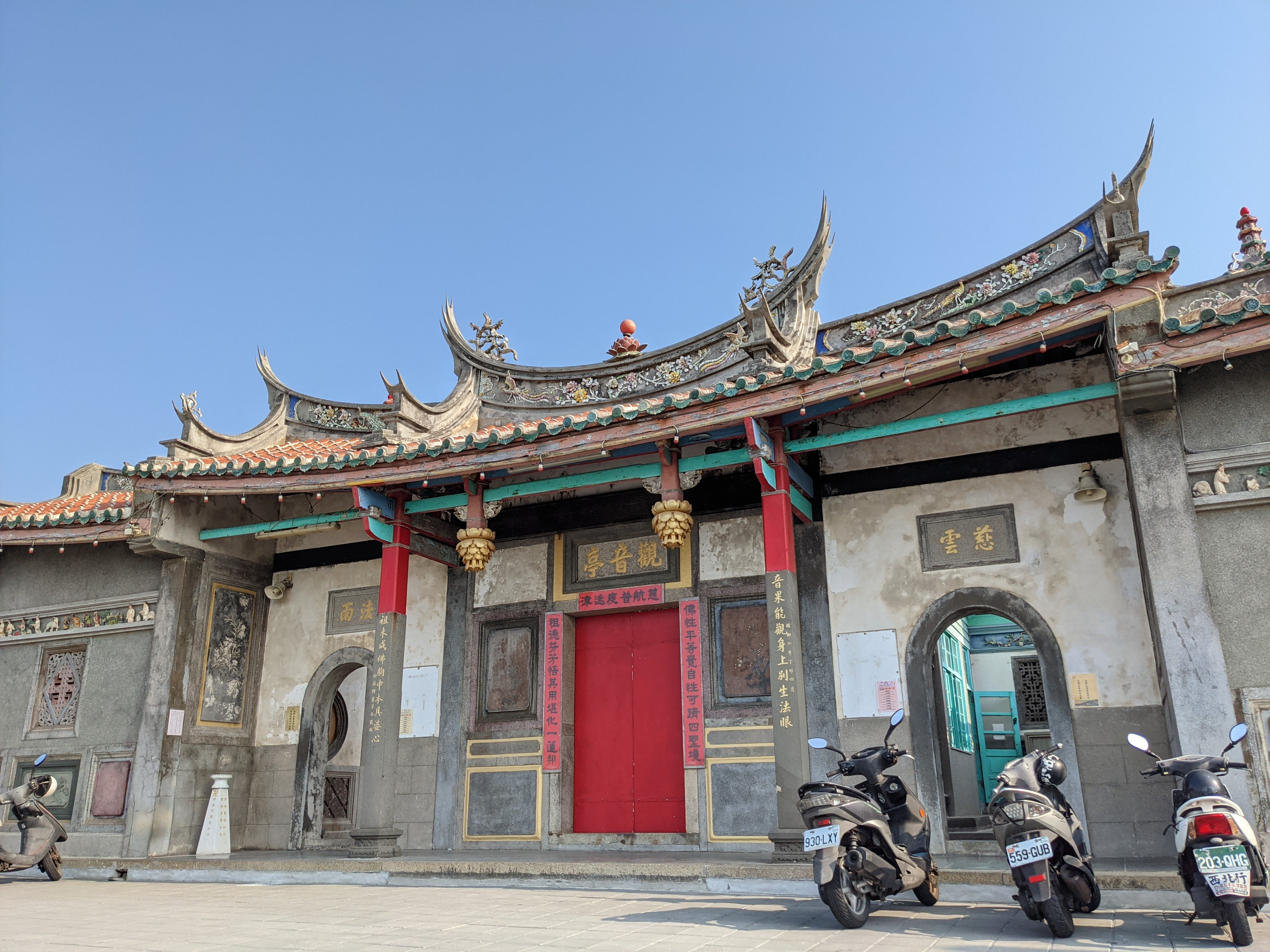
The Front View.

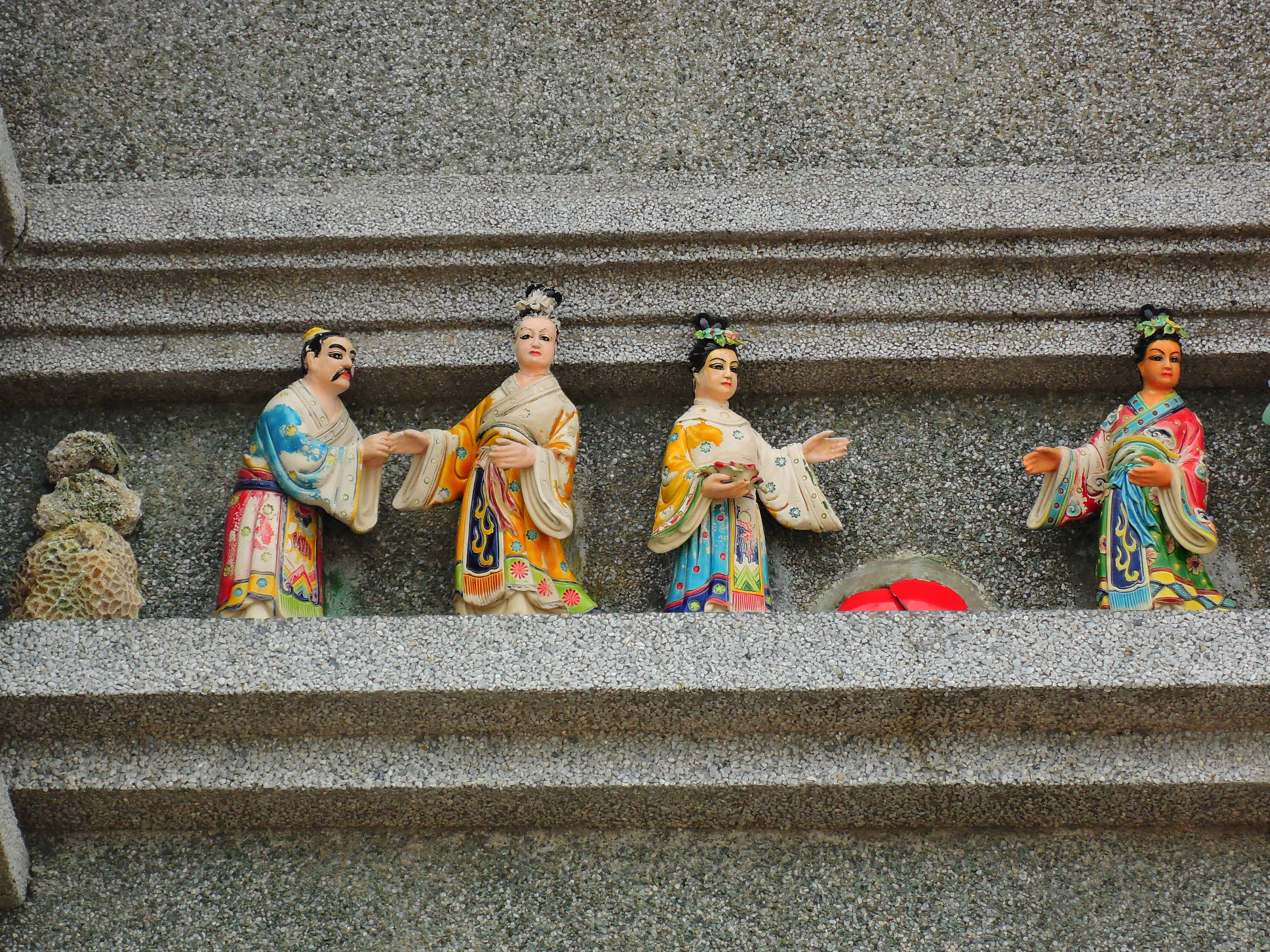
The human-shaped sculptural decorations on the exterior wall.

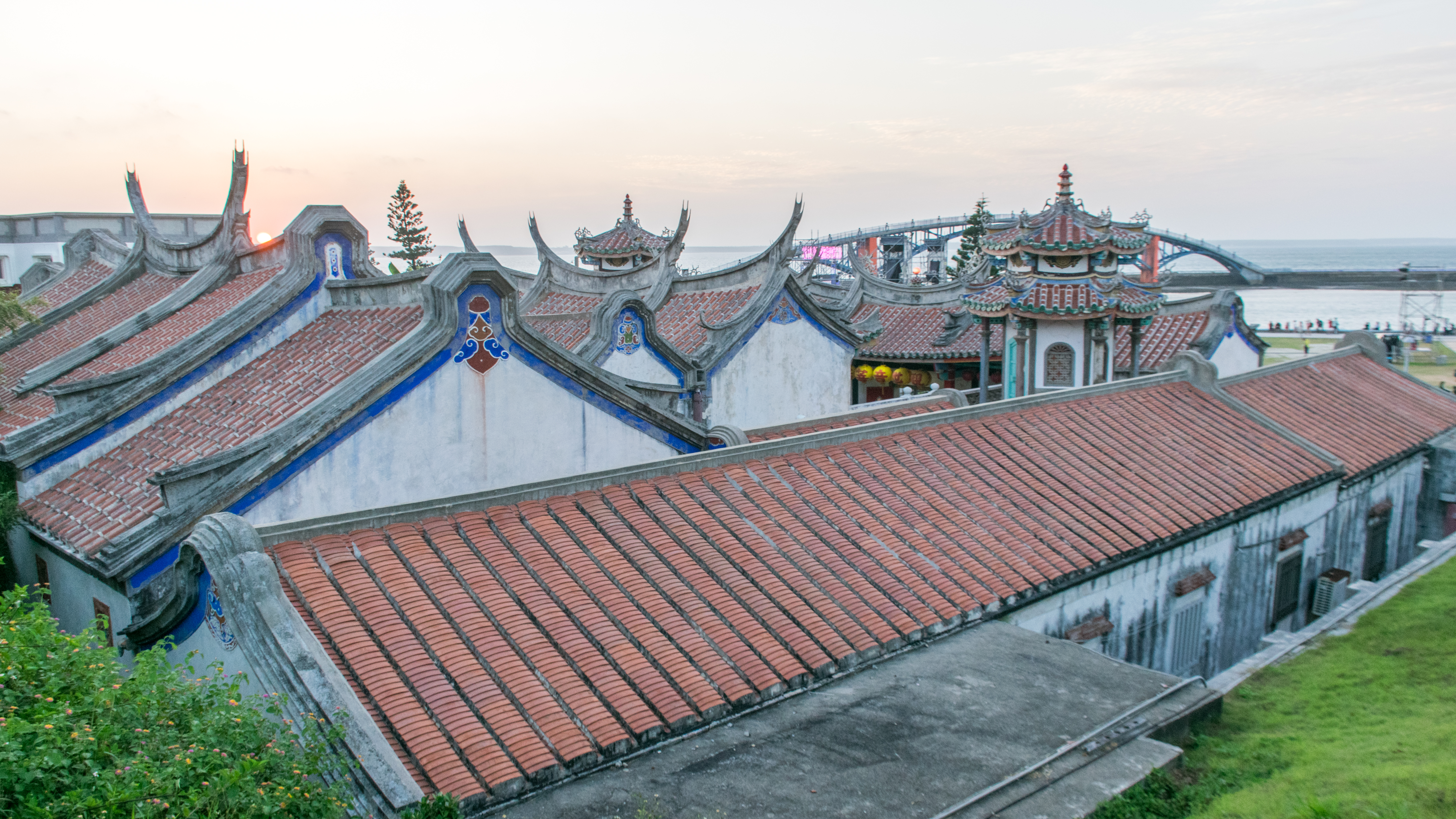
Temple with Rainbow Bridge and sunset.

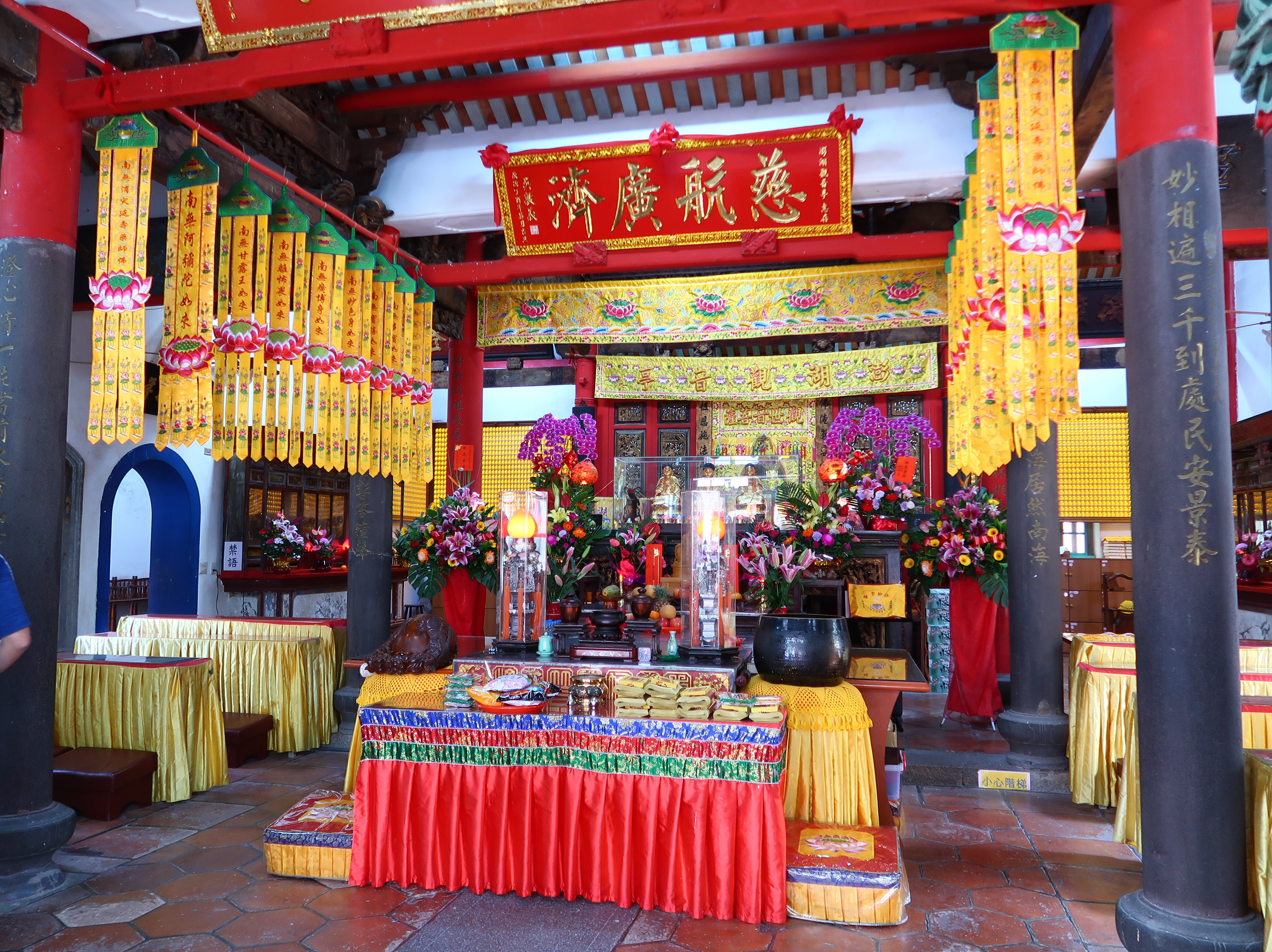
The Main Hall.

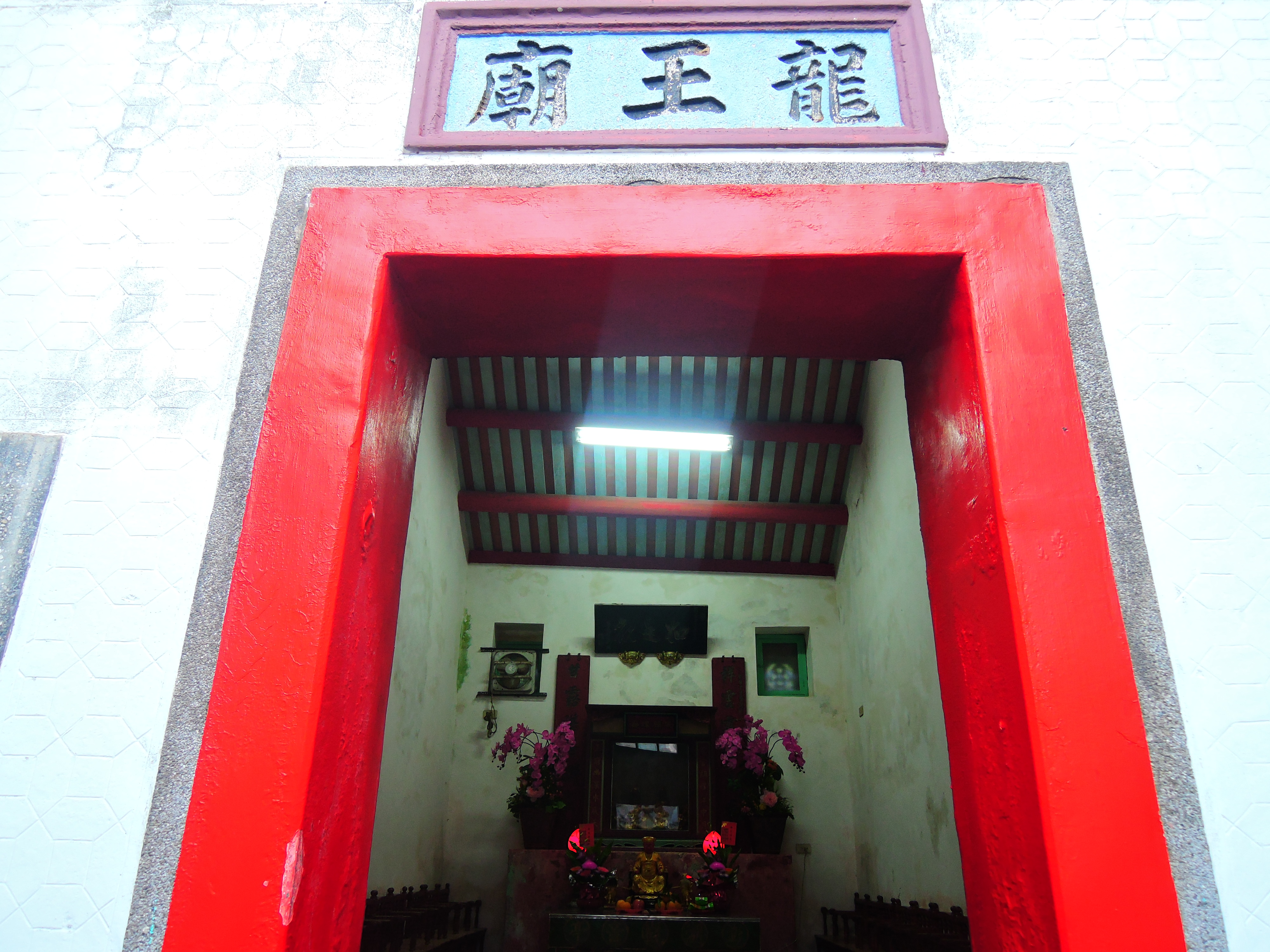
The Dragon King Temple located inside the Guanyin Temple.

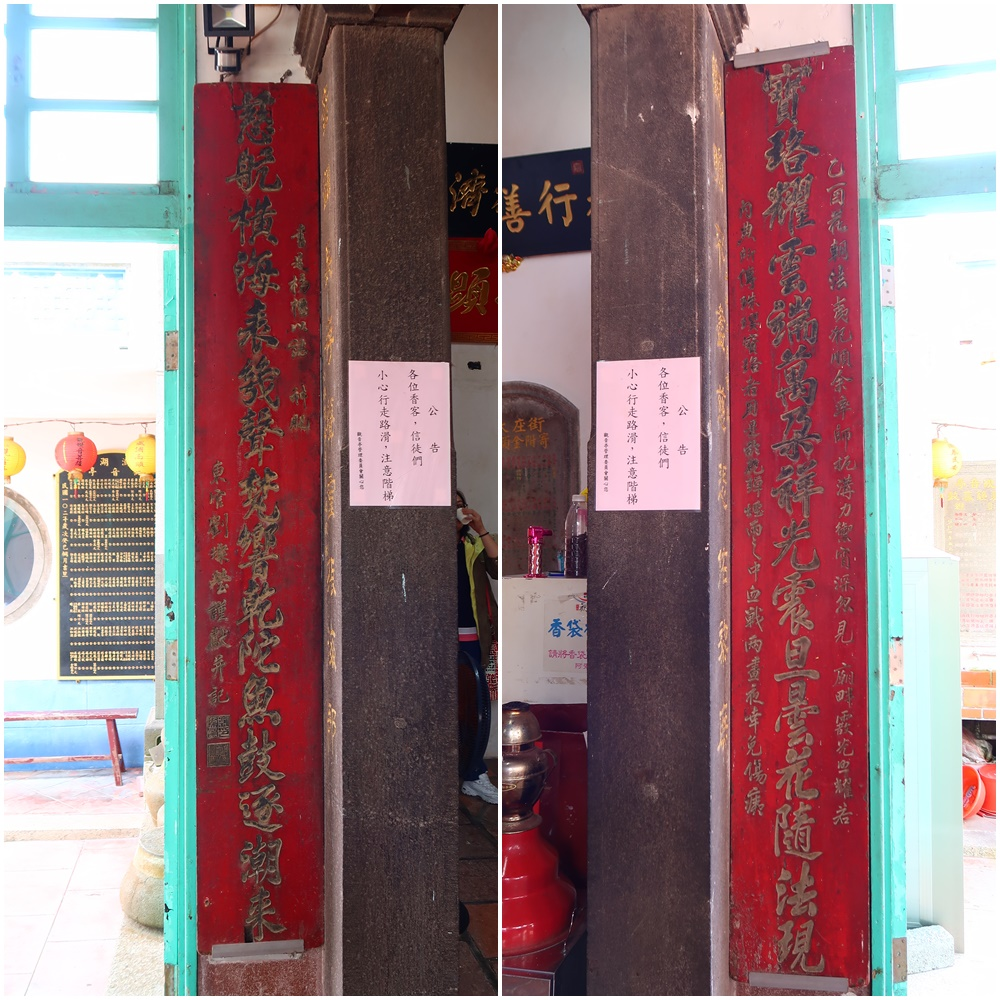
After the end of the Sino-French War, a pair of calligraphy couplets was gifted to the temple by a military officer who had participated in the Penghu campaign.

== See also ==
- Penghu Mazu Temple
- Penghu Daguankou Guanyin Temple
