= The 10th House =

2027 Vietnamese supernatural folk horror film

- Theatrical release poster
- Vietnamese: Trấn yểm
- Directed by: Trần Hữu Tấn
- Written by: Trần Hữu Tấn
- Based on: Lu Ban curse
- Produced by: Hoàng Quân
- Production companies: ProductionQ - Creative House; Galaxy Studio
- Distributed by: Galaxy Studio; Skyline Media
- Country: Vietnam
- Language: Vietnamese

The 10th House (Vietnamese: Trấn yểm) is an upcoming 2026 Vietnamese supernatural folk horror found-footage drama film directed and co-written by Trần Hữu Tấn and produced by Hoàng Quân. Based on a true story and stories surrounding Lu Ban curses in Asian folk beliefs, the film revolves around Văn Ân, a young man who documents supernatural occurrences inside his family home following the mysterious death of his father.

== Plot ==
After the mysterious death of his father inside their newly built house, Nguyễn Văn Ân lives with his mentally deteriorating mother as a series of unsettling supernatural events begin to unfold. In an attempt to uncover the truth, Ân starts documenting everything through a vlog series titled Spiritual Stories in My House (Chuyện tâm linh trong nhà mình). During his investigation, he discovers an ancient talisman buried beneath the foundation and gradually realizes that the house is connected to a Luban curse ritual passed down among construction workers — tied to a rumor that after nine ordinary houses, a mysterious “tenth house” is chosen for a dark purpose never meant to be revealed.

== Production ==
=== Development ===
In April 2026, ProductionQ and Galaxy Studio announced the horror film The 10th House. According to the producers, the film was inspired by stories surrounding Luban curses, a type of curse commonly associated with Asian folk beliefs. The film also marks ProductionQ’s return to working with Galaxy Studio since Survive and Skyline Media since The Sisters. Several media outlets also described the project as being presented in a found-footage style, drawing comparisons to Asian horror films such as Incantation, The Medium, and Gonjiam: Haunted Asylum. At the time of the announcement, information regarding the cast and characters had not yet been disclosed. Trần Hữu Tấn stated that in recent years, films such as Sinners, The Substance and Weapons have demonstrated that horror is no longer merely a form of entertainment, but can also serve as a medium for filmmakers to tell personal, haunting and artistically driven stories while reflecting contemporary social issues. Through the project, he expressed his desire to introduce Vietnamese folklore, spiritual beliefs and culturally rooted fears to international audiences, while creating more opportunities for Vietnamese horror films to gain wider recognition in the global film market.

Shortly afterward, international distributor Skyline Media announced that the film would be introduced at the Marché du Film of the Cannes Film Festival in search of international distribution partners. Furthermore, the film is considered the first feature film to center on this theme.
