= Lo Pan Temple =

Temple in Hong Kong

- 魯班先師廟
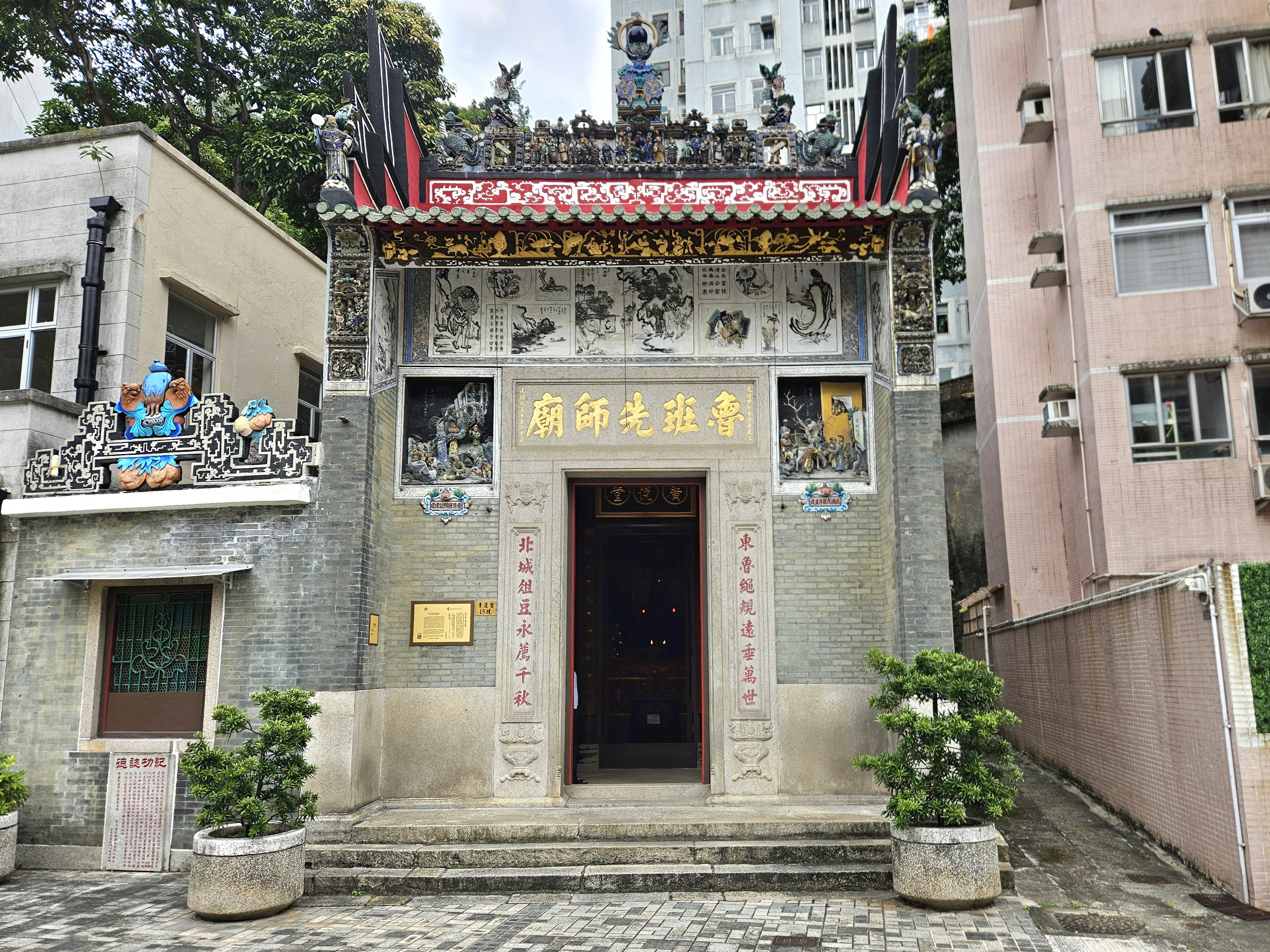
- Lo Pan Temple

Religion
- Affiliation: Chinese folk religion
- Deity: Lo Pan
- Festival: Lo Pan Festival
- Ownership: Kwong Yuet Tong

Location
- Interactive map of Lo Pan Temple

Architecture
- Founder: Contractors Guild

Lo Pan Temple
- 魯班先師廟 (Chinese)
- Location within Hong Kong
- 22.283033°N 114.132005°E
- Location: 15 Ching Lin Terrace, Kennedy Town, Hong Kong

History
- Built: 1884

Site notes
- Architect: Contractors Guild

Hong Kong Graded Building – Grade I

Lo Pan Temple
- Traditional Chinese: 魯班先師廟
Transcriptions
Yue: Cantonese
- Yale Romanization: Lóuh bāan sīn sī miuh
- Jyutping: Lou5 baan1 sin1 si1 miu6

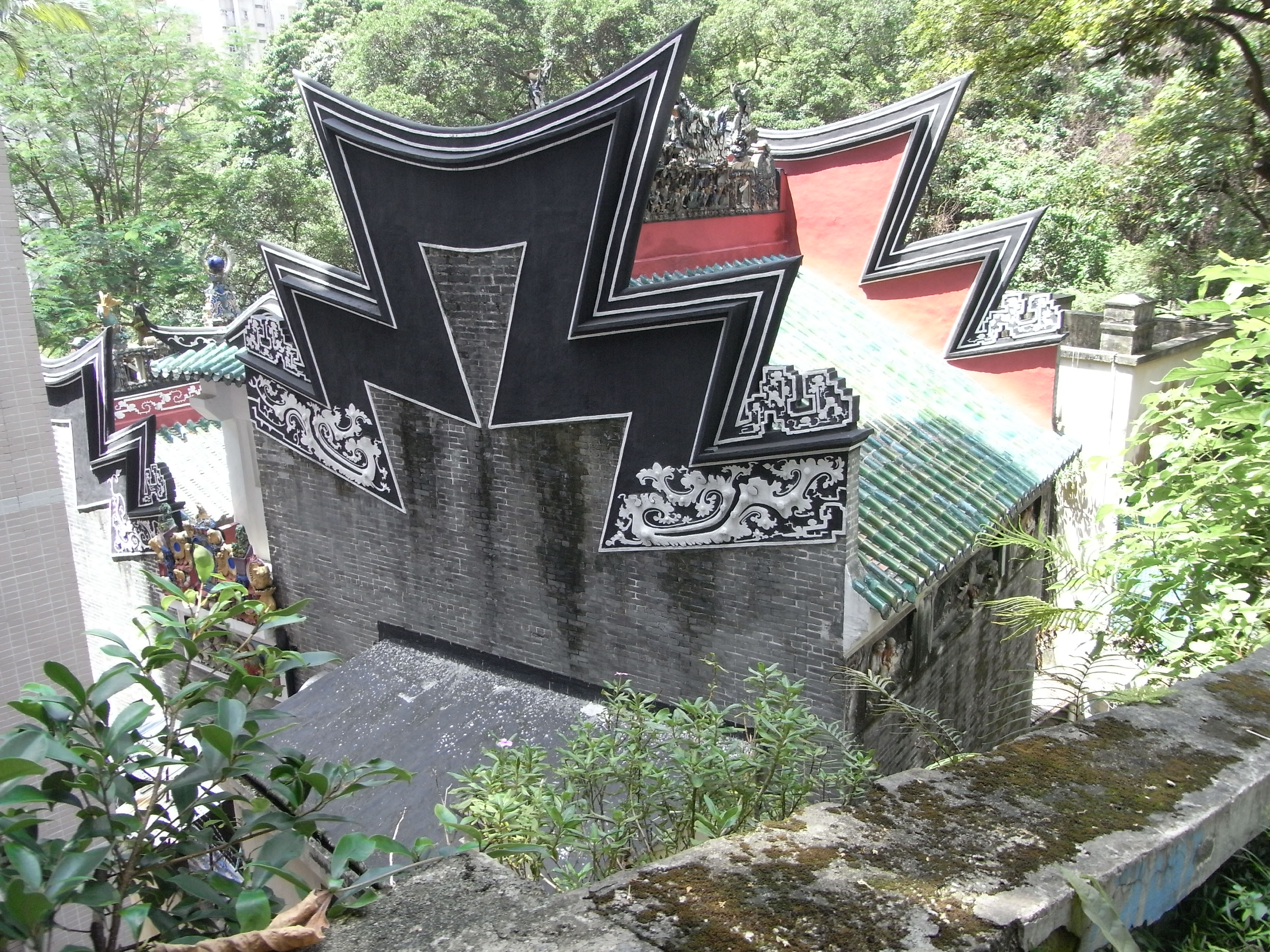
Roof of Lo Pan Temple

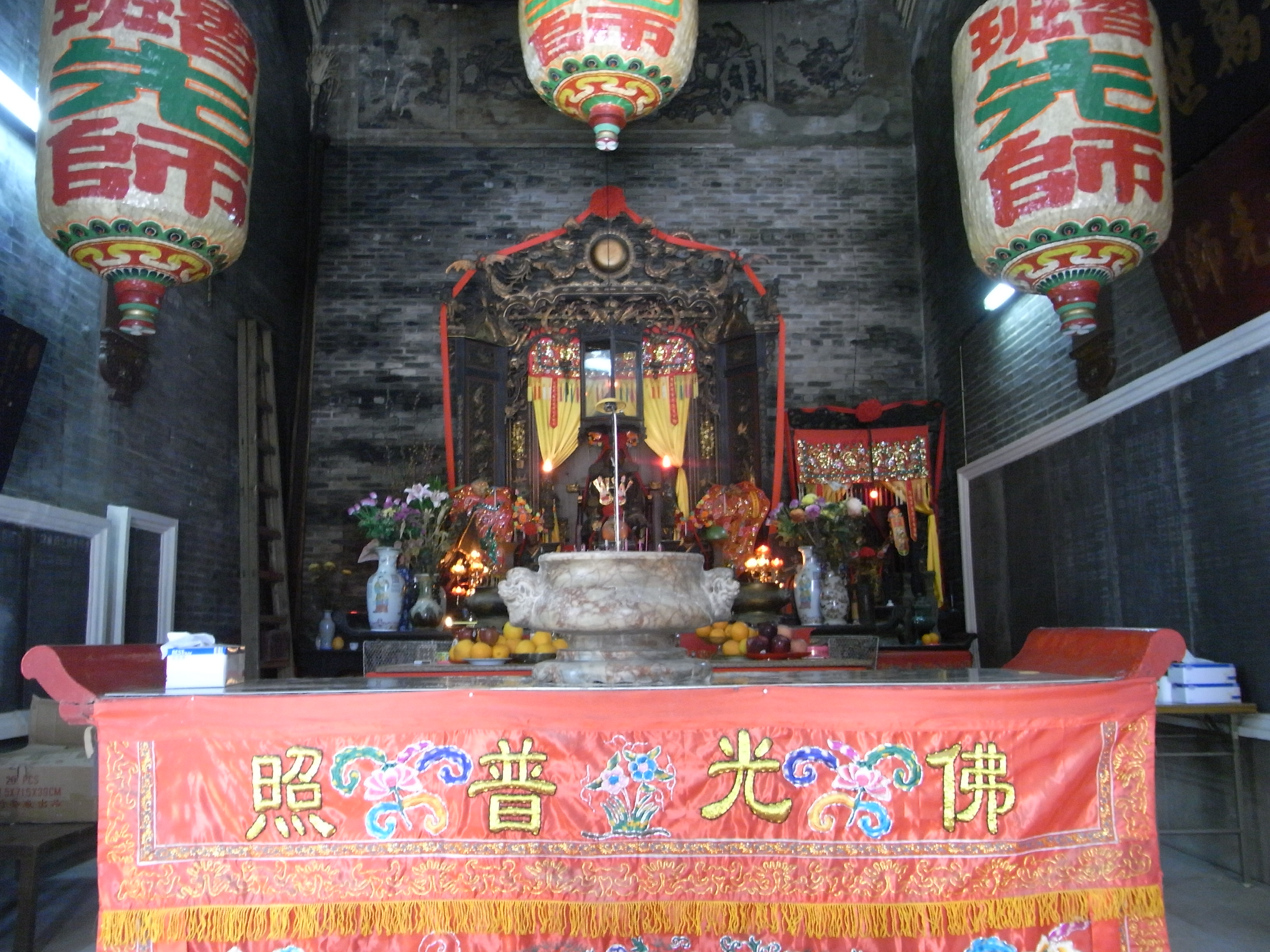
Interior of Lo Pan Temple

Lo Pan Temple is a temple located in Kennedy Town, Hong Kong Island, Hong Kong dedicated to Lo Pan (魯班; also transliterated as "Lu Ban"), the patron saint of Chinese builders and contractors.

First built in 1884, it is now classified as a Grade I historic building, and is also part of the Central and Western Heritage Trail-The Western District and the Peak Route.

== Lo Pan (Lu Ban) ==
Lu Ban was a Chinese carpenter, engineer, philosopher, inventor, military thinker, statesman who lived during the Spring and Autumn period of China. Lo Pan was deified as a god, and is the patron deity of Chinese builders and contractors. According to folk legend, he was born with a huge flock of cranes spiralling above his home and his room full of a special fragrance. He was therefore conceived as a celestial being. His festival falls on the 13th day of the sixth month of the Lunar Calendar.

== Temple history ==
Located at 15 Ching Lin Terrace, the temple is the only urban temple in Hong Kong erected to commemorate Lo Pan. It was built by the Contractors Guild in 1884 with donations from many people connected with the trade. According to the record of a stone carving inside the temple, over 1172 people from different towns in Guangdong joined together to donate money for the establishment of Lo Pan Temple.

The ownership of the land on which the temple was built has changed several times over the years, and in 1921 it was acquired by the Kwong Yuet Tong, which is currently the management body of the temple. In 1949, Kwong Yuet Tong was registered as a legal entity to manage the Temple. The staff of Kwong Yuet Tong mainly consists of the builders in Hong Kong.

Although there are several temples on the mainland China that are dedicated to Lo Pan, they are usually dedicated to Lo Pan along with other deities; Lo Pan Temple in Hong Kong pays tribute solely to Lo Pan. Although repair and maintenance work is often carried out, the Temple generally remains as its original appearance and structure. In 1949, an office of Kwong Yuet Tong and Hong Wah Secondary School were built on the vacant land next to the Temple.

Year	Event
1884	Establishment of Lo Pan Temple by the Contractor's Guild
1921	Kwong Yuet Tong became the management company of Lo Pan Temple
1928	Renovation work took place
1949	Kwong Yuet Tong registered as a legal entity
1949	The office of Kwong Yuet Tong and Hong Wah Secondary School were built next to the Temple
2006	Lo Pan Temple was declared monument as a Grade I historic building
2009	The 125th Anniversary of Lo Pan Temple was celebrated

== Architectural style ==
The Temple is a two-hall structure, with an unusual jagged roof, elaborate "fire" type parapet walls, clay sculptural figures, relieves and paintings inside and outside the Temple. It is the Chinese temple with the largest number of wall-paintings on Hong Kong Island.

=== Wall-paintings ===
Lo Pan Temple is known for its diverse murals filled with traditional Chinese Cultural style depicting different people, insects, animals, flowers and landscapes such as butterflies and narcissi (蝴蝶水仙圖), Bodhidharma Crossing Waves on a Reed (達摩一葦渡江), rowing a boat (張騫泛槎圖), Evening Trip to Red Cliff (夜遊赤壁圖), visiting friends (訪友圖), ladies next to the rock (倚石仕女圖), etc., a total of 26 pieces mural paintings. Different styles of calligraphy are incorporated into the wall-paintings to serve as captions.

=== Clay sculpture ===
Having different clay sculpture on the walls is one of the unique characteristics of Lo Pan Temple since it is difficult to find clay sculptures in the temples on Hong Kong Island. Those sculptures can be found on the wall and gable of the Temple. The theme of the sculptures are mainly about some Chinese history and mythology. For example, inside the Temple, there is a clay sculpture of one famous Chinese mythology "Historical Romance"(封神演義) on the left wall. There are also clay sculptures of plants, animals, etc. around the Temple.

=== Stone carvings ===
Inside the temple, there is a stone carving which is the oldest antique established in the Qing dynasty. It records the purpose of the temple's construction—to commemorate Lo Pan as the god of Chinese Architecture and to remind descendants to think of the origin.

=== Autography ===
On the two sides of the main door, there are engravings of Chinese poems which praise the contribution of Lo Pan in Architecture and wish his spirit can last forever.

== Lo Pan Festival ==
On the 13th day of the sixth month of every Lunar Calendar, the birthday of Lo Pan, Kwong Yuet Tong celebrates Lo Pan Festival. Meals (師傅飯) are distributed to celebrate the Festival. Many builders participate in the pilgrimage up the 200 steps from Belcher's Street to pray for working safely and smoothly. Builders and the Government also donate money for the upkeep of the Temple.

Besides, Lion dance and dragon dance are performed outside the Temple for entertainment and a ceremony is held by the Labour and Welfare Bureau to award the builders with outstanding performance to encourage the improvement of skills within the construction industry.

Apart from the celebration, Taoist priests are invited to comfort the deceased by chanting prayers inside the Temple.

== See also ==
- Lo Pan (Lu Ban)
- List of Grade I historic buildings in Hong Kong
