= Magong Beiji Temple =

Temple in Magong, Penghu, Taiwan

Coordinates: 23°33′53.2″N 119°34′01.3″E

Dongjia Beiji Temple
- 東甲北極殿
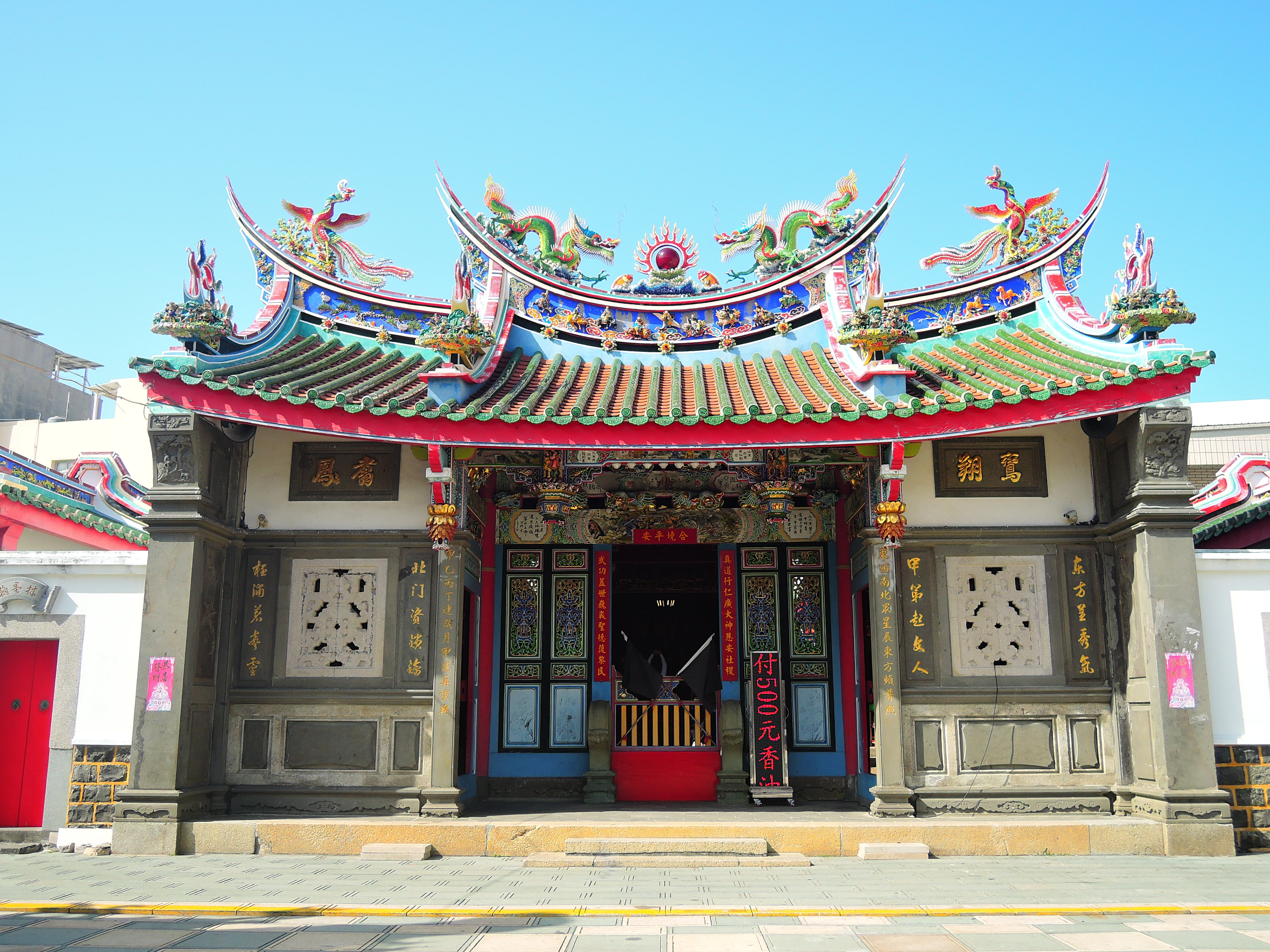

Religion
- Affiliation: Taoism

Location
- Location: 2 Qiming Street, Magong, Penghu, Taiwan
- Interactive map of Dongjia Beiji Temple

Architecture
- Completed: before 1791

Website
- 澎湖縣馬公市東甲北極殿

Magong Beiji Temple (Chinese: 北極殿; pinyin: Běijí Diàn) is a temple in Magong City, Penghu, Taiwan. The temple is dedicated to Xuantian Shangdi. Because the location of temple is at the eastern side of ancient Magong city, so Beiji Temple is more widely known as "Dongjia Temple". (東甲宮; pinyin: dōng jiǎ gōng; its first character "東 dong" means "east"; the next character "甲 jia" is "a district unit during Qing Dynasty"; the last character "宮 gong" is temple.)

== History ==
The year of establishment is unknown, some said it had existed since the late of Ming dynasty, some said it founded by Zhao Guang (趙廣) in 1690. However, we can confirm that the earliest recording of repair is after 1791 at least.

During the Guangxu years of Qing dynasty, there were three "jia" (甲), a kind of district unit in the past, which distributed over the Magong harbor area, they were "Dongjia (東甲)", "Beijia (北甲)" and "Nanjia (南甲)", means "East Jia", "North Jia" and "South Jia" in Chinese.

By tradition, these local residents would serve their own temple in every single Jia. Magong Beiji Temple belongs to the Dongjia area, it is also the most ancient one among those three according to the chorography of Qing dynasty. Beiji Temples mainly serves "Xuan Tian Shang Di (Chinese: 玄天上帝)", also known as "Zhen Wu Shang Di (Chinese: 真武上帝)", like other temples in Taiwan, the temple also housed a lot of god statues as well, including Cundi Bodhisattva, Dark Lady, Lord of the Soil and the Ground, Royal Lord and so on.

== See also ==
- Penghu Mazu Temple
- Penghu Guanyin Temple
- Magong Chenghuang Temple
- Penghu Shuixian Temple
- List of temples in Taiwan
