= Shuixian Zunwang =

Group of five Taoist immortals

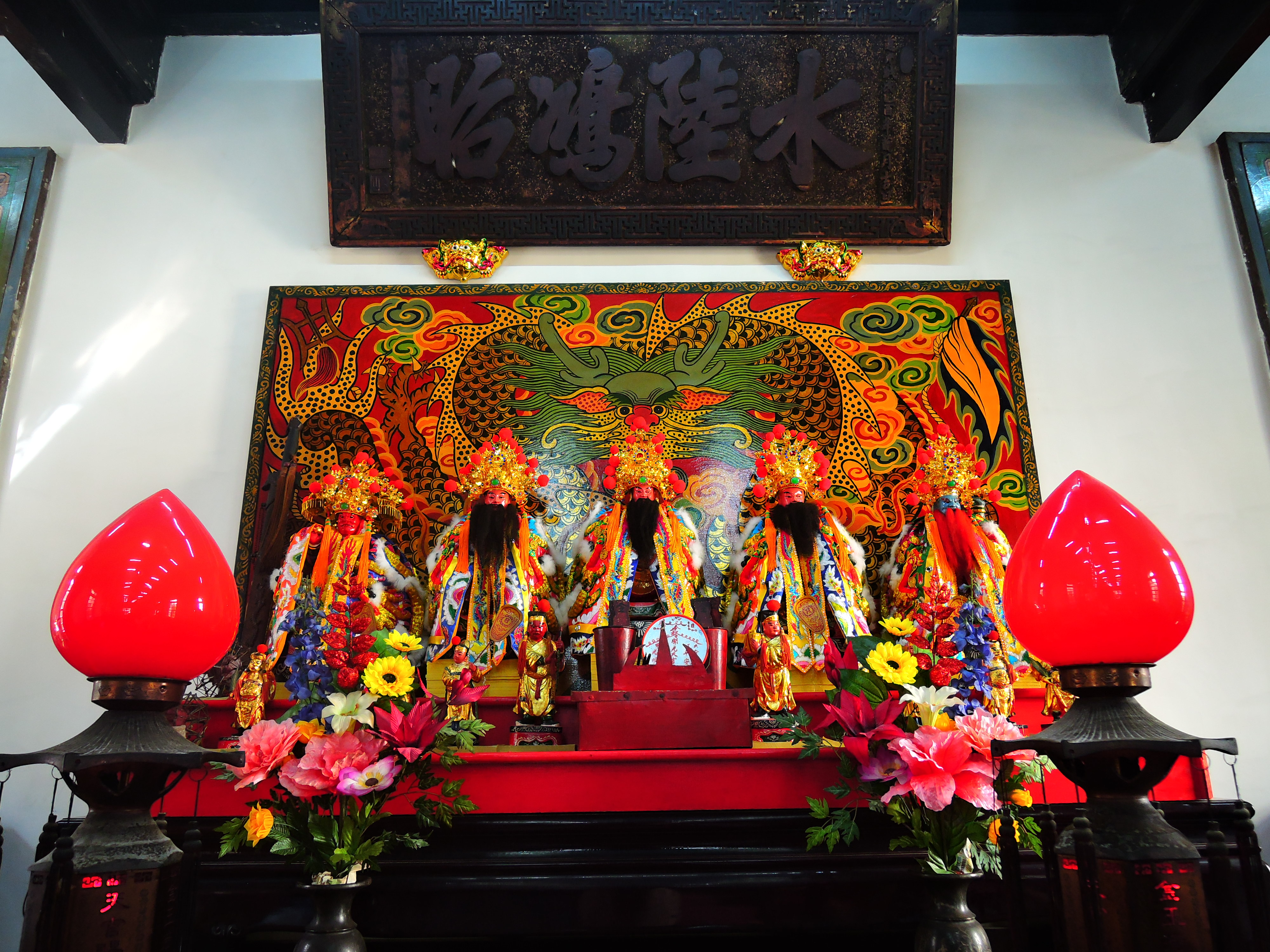
- Shuixian Zunwang，Penghu Shuixian Temple
- Chinese: 水仙尊王
- Literal meaning: Honorable King(s) of the Water Immortals
Transcriptions
Standard Mandarin
- Hanyu Pinyin: Shuǐxiān Zūnwáng
- Wade–Giles: Shui-hsien Tsun-wang

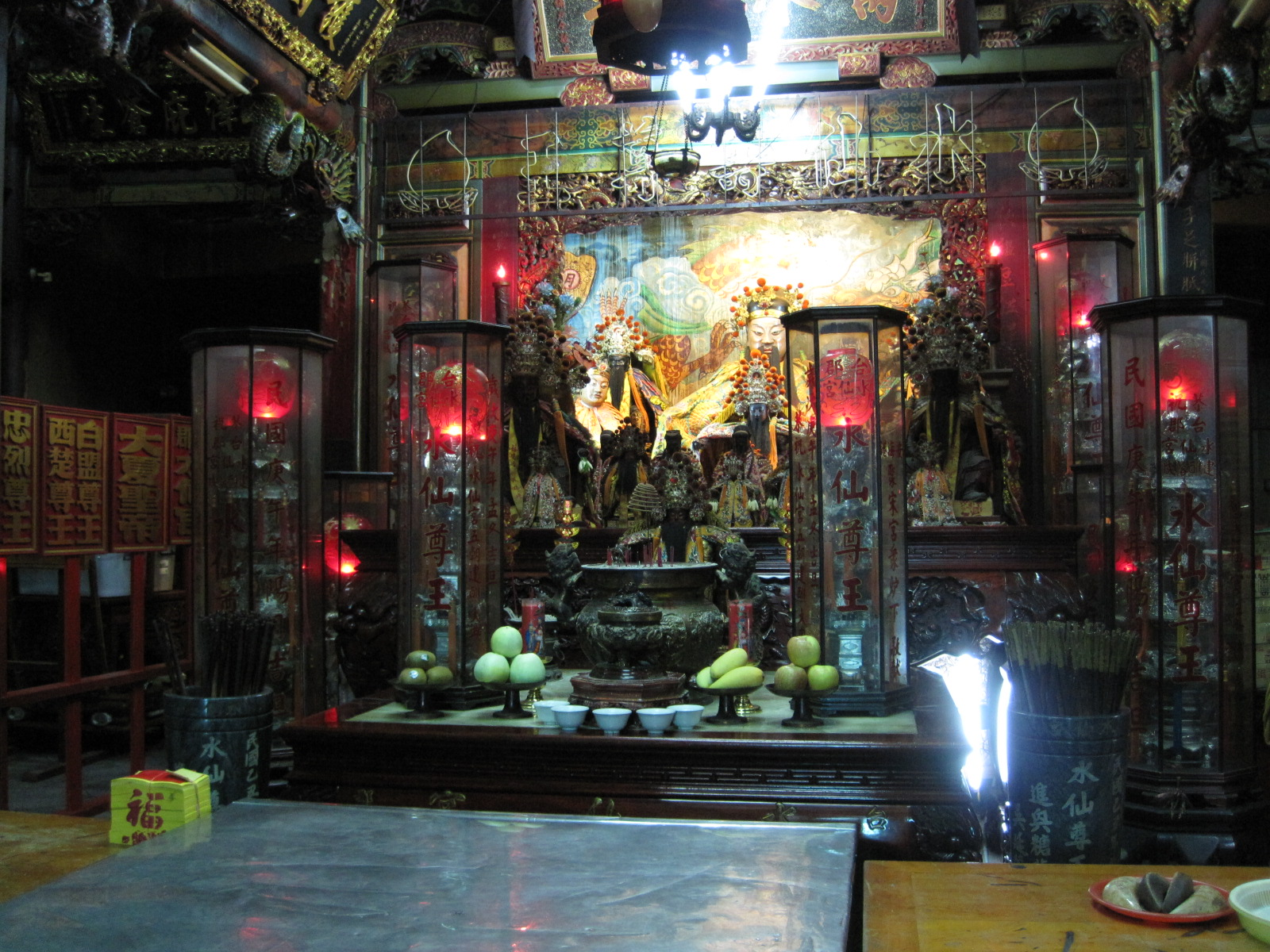
The main altar of the water immortal temple in Tainan on Taiwan.

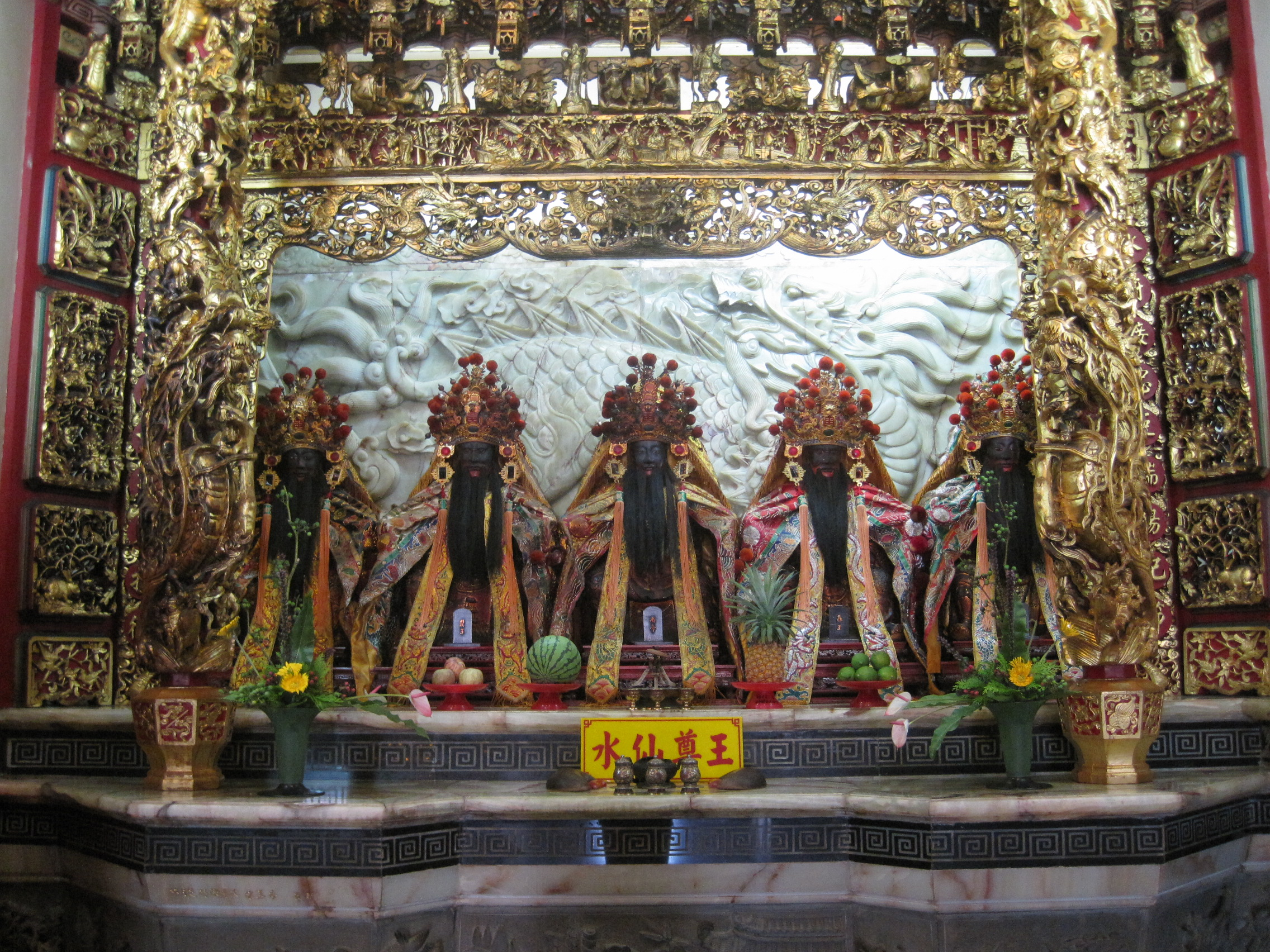
A shrine to the five kings in the Anping Tianhou Temple in Tainan.

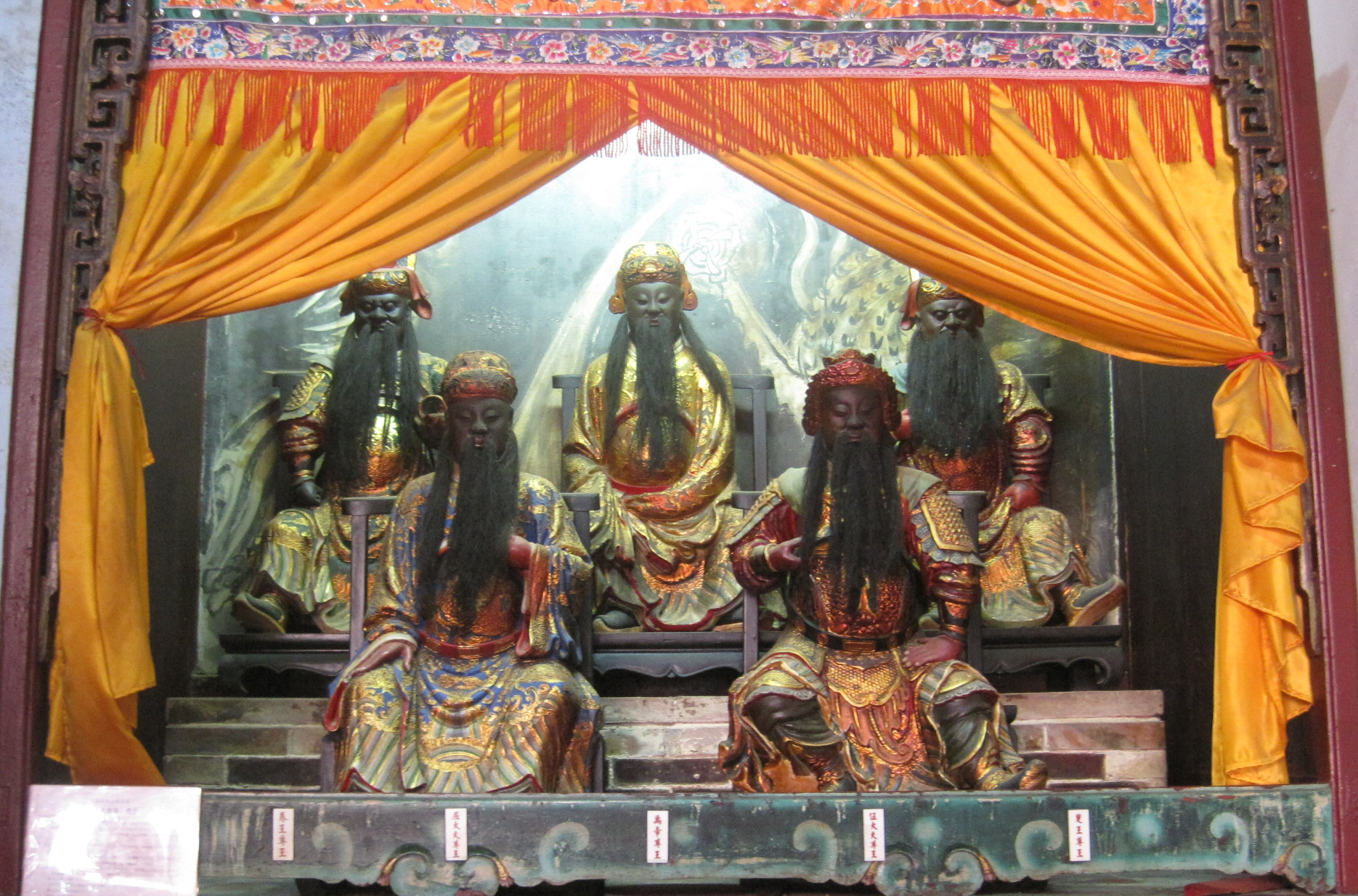
A shrine to the five kings in the Grand Matsu Temple in Tainan.

The Shuixian Zunwang are five Chinese Deities worshipped as water and sea deities. They have various names in English including the Honorable Water Immortal Kings and the Lords of the Water. All five deities were formerly famous heroes and are related to water in certain ways. They are also believed to protect vessels in transit.

== Names ==
The Chinese title Shuǐxiān Zūnwáng is variously translated into English as the Honorable Water Immortal Kings, the Illustrious, Revered, or Eminent Kings of the Water Immortals, the Noble King Water Spirits, the Shuexian Deities, the Five Water-Gods, and the Gods of the Waters.

The head of the five is Yu the Great, the legendary first emperor of the Xia dynasty in prehistoric China. Within China, the Xia are now generally associated with the historical Erlitou culture along the Wei and middle Yellow Rivers, while foreign scholarship often continues to dismiss it as legendary. Yu became regarded as a water deity through his involvement with controlling the Great Flood of Chinese myth, which may have preserved aspects of the Yellow River's massive flooding c. 1920 BCE. As Chinese generally fails to distinguish between singular and plural nouns, zūnwáng is sometimes considered to refer to a single Illustrious King. In such cases, it is usually identified with Yu alone.

The existence of a quintet of gods, however, is thought to derive from a misunderstanding of Wu Zixu's surname 伍 (p Wǔ) as intending its usual sense as a synonym for the Chinese word for "five" (五, p wǔ) in its appearance in his divine title "King Wu" (伍王, p Wǔwáng). However, there are several water deities apart from Wu.

Wu Zixu was a Chu noble who was forced into exile in Wu. (Note: Records of the Grand Historian, cited in Nienhauser.) There, he helped the prince Ji Guang assassinate the king and enthrone himself as King Helü. He then played a role in Wu's invasion of his homeland, exhuming the corpse of its former king to punish it for the earlier death of his father and brother. He accurately predicted that Yue would endanger Wu but did not have the ear of Helü's successor Fuchai. He was forced to commit suicide; his body placed in a leather bag and then thrown into a river. After the fall of Wu, Wu Zixu's spirit was worshipped as Taoshen, "God of the Waves", and particularly as the god of the Qiantang Tidal Bore at Hangzhou. Wu Zixu had also been involved with the urban planning of King Helü's capital at Suzhou and is sometimes considered a culture hero credited with inventing the waterwheel.

Xiang Yu, the "warlord of western Chu" whose revolt ended the Qin Empire in 206 BC, was killed fighting the forces of Han beside the Wu River in Anhui in 202 BC. He is usually said to have slit his throat and had his body torn to pieces by his enemies, but he became regarded as a water deity from a separate legend that his body miraculously remained standing in the waters of the Wu after his suicide.

Qu Yuan was a poet and advisor to his relative the king of Chu. He was exiled upon supposedly slanderous reports of his fellow courtiers and committed suicide by walking into the Miluo while holding a rock, out of frustration with either his exile or with the direction of Chu's public policy. His memory is honored at Duanwu by various the traditions of the Dragon Boat Festival, although some believe this to have been a misplaced bit of Wu Zixu's legacy.

The fifth figure variously appears as "King" Ao (奡王, Àowáng) or as the inventor Lu Ban.

The "King" Ao—literally the "Arrogant King"—is the deified form of Ao (奡, Ào) (Note: The Zuo Zhuan, translated in Selby.) or Jiao (澆, Jiāo), the preternaturally strong son of Han Zhuo, the advisor who usurped the realm of the archer Houyi in the 8th year of the reign of the Xia king Xiang. Ao is said to have conquered the state of Ge for his father during the same year. He became regarded as a water deity through his supposed role as the inventor of ships, which he was said to be able to sail across land as well as water. He was killed by Xiang's son King Shaokang.

Lu Ban, also known by his Cantonese name Lo Pan, was a woodworker at the end of the Spring and Autumn period who became revered as the Chinese god of carpentry and masonry. The great demand for his work during his life supposedly compelled him to invent or improve a number of carpenter's tools—the saw, the square, the planer, the drill, the shovel, and an ink marking tool—to complete his many projects more quickly.

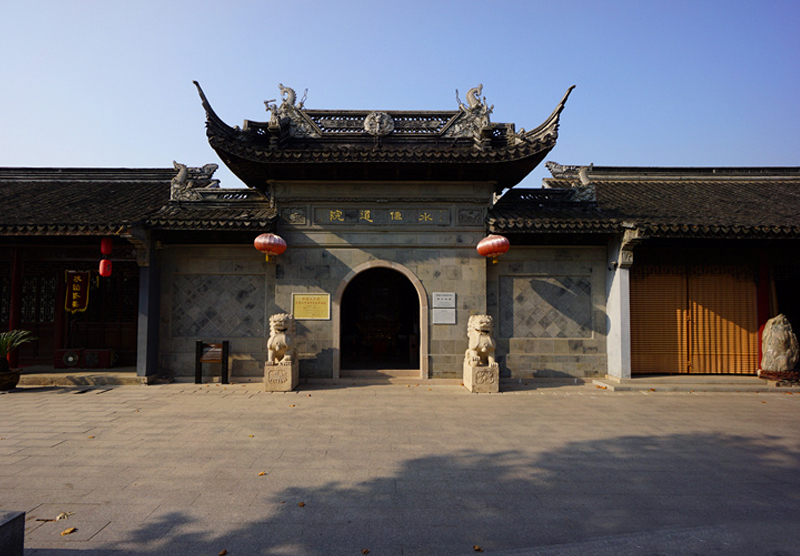
A temple of the water immortals in Wuxi on the mainland, preserved as a museum.

== History ==
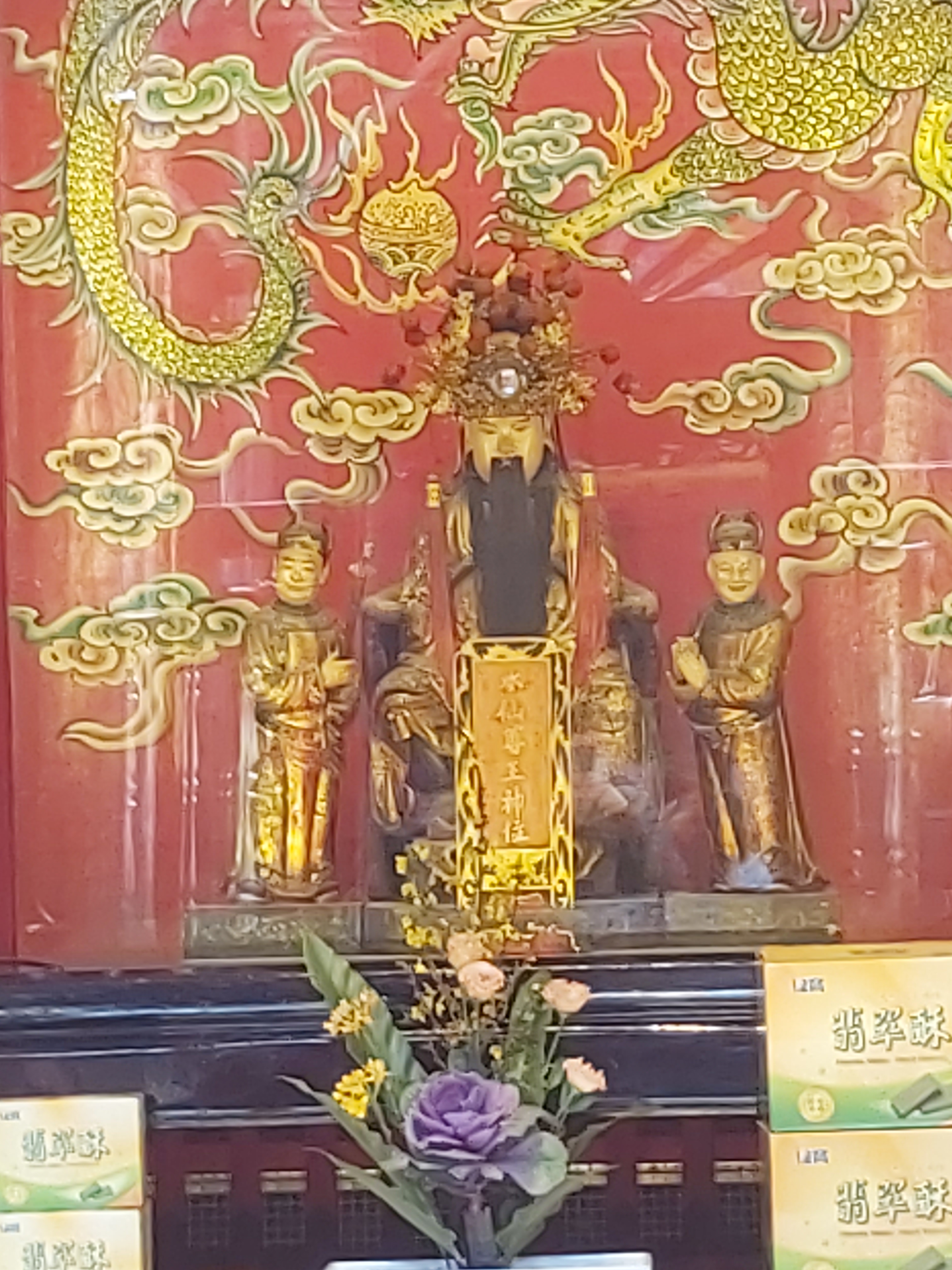
Statue of Shuixian Zunwang at Bangka Lungshan Temple, Taipei.

The worship of the Shuixian Zunwang as a quintet of kings is suggested to be derive from a misunderstanding of one of Wu Zixu's religious titles. (Chinese generally lacks plural noun forms and his surname is a variant of the Chinese word for "five".) The honorable kings or Lords of Water were related to water in certain ways and were first worshipped around Xiamen region, which became a stronghold for Ming loyalists during the Qing conquest of China. Under Koxinga, the Zheng dynasty defeated the Dutch on Taiwan and moved from a base at Xiamen to the area around Tainan, which they ruled as the Kingdom of Tungning. They appear to have been responsible for the introduction of the worship of Fujian's five kings there.

== Worship ==
Bengang Shuixian Temple in Chiayi County, Taiwan

The Shuixian Zunwang are worshipped as protectors of ships in transit. A shrine in their honor was included on most Taiwanese vessels during the imperial era; even today, most Taiwanese harbors include temples to them. There are shrines dedicated to the deities in many Mazu temples.

== See also ==
- Mazu
- Dragon Kings of the Four Seas
- List of Chinese gods
- Penghu Shuixian Temple
- Jiao (commercial guild)
