= Kau (commercial guild) =

Taiwanese commercial guild organization

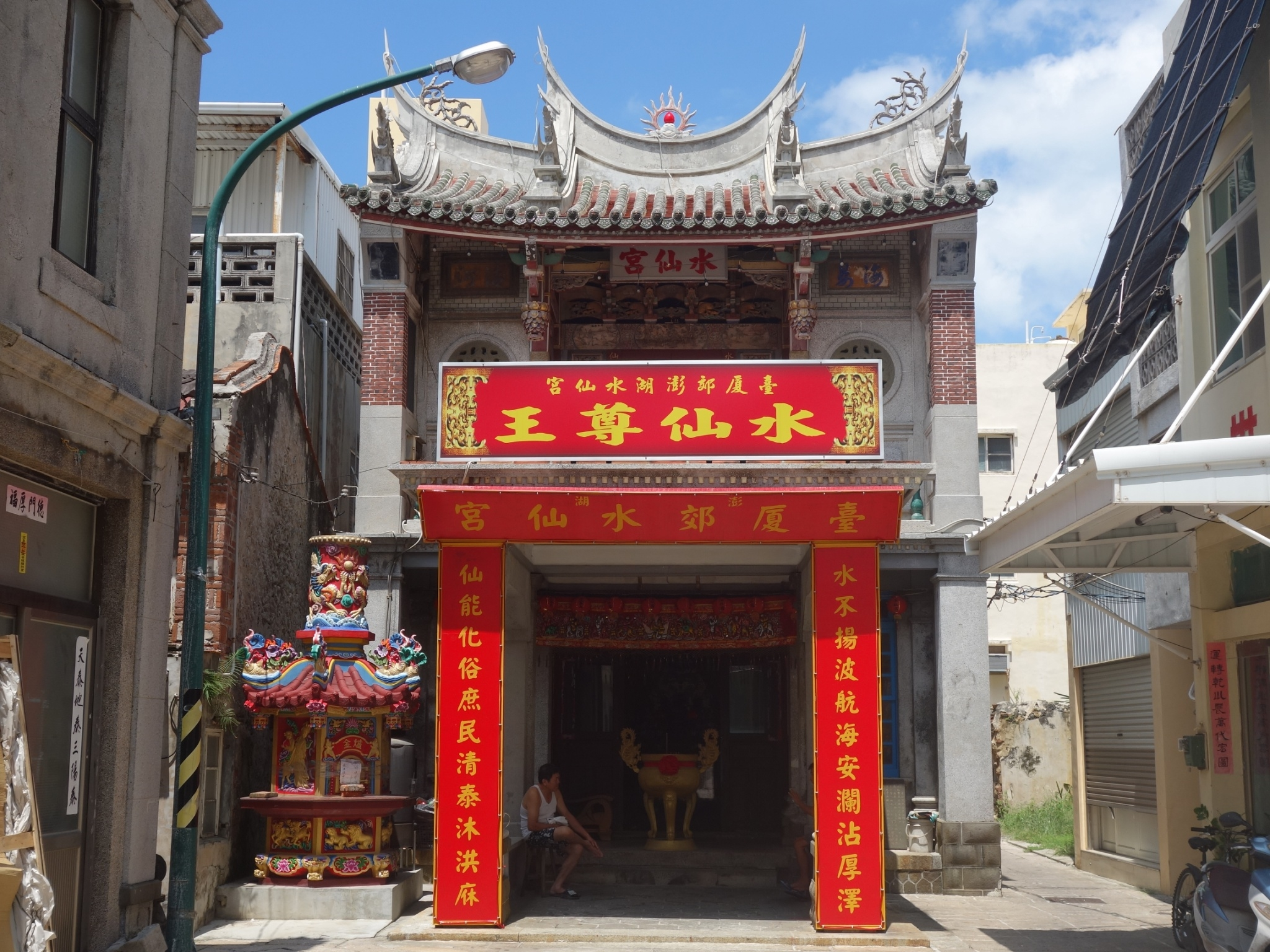
Tâi-ē-kau Guild Hall in Penghu (Penghu Narcissus Palace).

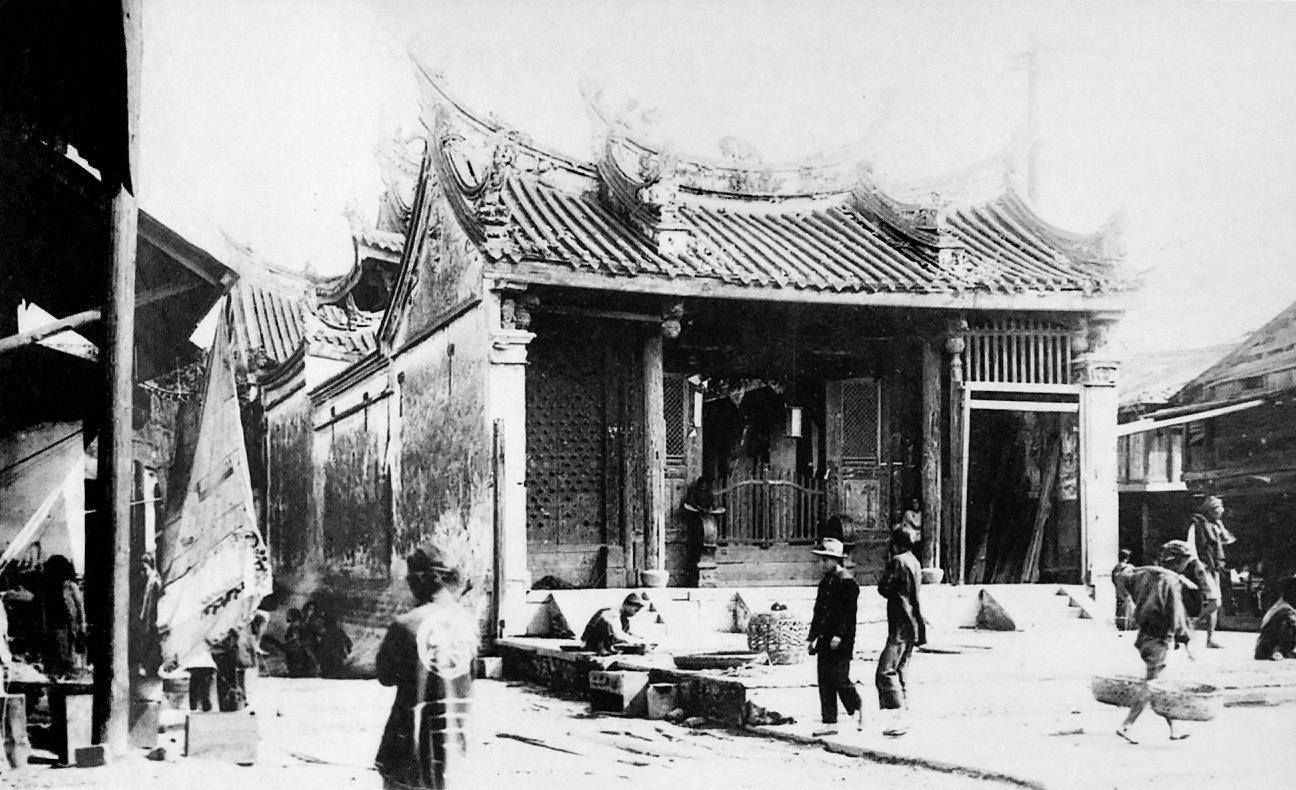
Tainan Shueisian Temple built in the three Kaus of Tainan.

Kau (Chinese character: 郊; Min Nan Chinese: Kau; pinyin: Jiao), also known as Jiao-shang (郊商 in Hanyu Pinyin), Hang-jiao (行郊 in Hanyu Pinyin), and also known as Ding-shou (頂手 in Hanyu Pinyin) and Jiu-Ba-hang (九八行 in Hanyu Pinyin), (Note: Originating from entrusting suburban merchants to sell goods, they are usually given a "commission" of 2% of the value of the goods as a "commission", and their own party only receives 98% of the total selling price of the goods. Therefore, the entrusted suburban merchants are called "98xing". However, the 2% commission rate is not a fixed number, and different commission rates may arise depending on the market situation of the product.) was a commercial guild organization that spread throughout Taiwan during the Qing dynasty. The members of the organization were mostly ship merchants or merchants who settled in ports. In the middle of the Qing dynasty, the commercial function of in Kau was gradually declining due to the sedimentation of the Taiwan River mouth and the establishment of foreign businesses by Western forces after the Xianfeng era of the Qing dynasty. However, after 1937, due to the outbreak of the second Sino-Japanese War and the long-term confrontation between the two sides of the Taiwan Strait after 1949, the commercial function of Kau gradually declined and had already disappeared. Most of the existing Kau have been transformed into religious groups dedicated to worship Shuixian Zunwang, Mazu, or Guan Yu.

== Origin ==
The term "Hangjiao" (行郊 in Hanyu Pinyin) originated from the "guild system" in ancient China: its prototype can be traced back to the Six Dynasties (period: 220–589) when the term "Hang" was used to describe the gathering of commercial and commercial colonizers in cities. However, the term "Hang" actually appeared in the Sui dynasty and only matured during the Tang and Song dynasties. After the Yuan and Ming dynasties, industry organizations such as "Hang" became very popular, but their titles were not fixed, and they differed from time to time as "Hui" or "Bang". In the case of the "public offices", they are also collectively called "Gongsuo" or "Huiguan".

In the 23rd year of the Kangxi Emperor (1684), after Taiwan and Penghu were included in the territory of the Qing dynasty, immigrants from Fujian and Guangdong gradually flooded in. In response to the prevailing trend of cross-strait trade, the system of "trade associations" in their hometown was also introduced in Taiwan. To avoid vicious competition and protect their own interests, most businessmen in Taiwan formed guilds with merchants from the same region, which are referred to as "Jiaoshang" or "Hangjiao" in Taiwan.

The earliest written record of the word "Hangjiao" in Taiwan appeared in the "Shuixian Temple Clearance Tablet" (Tainan Shuixian Temple) erected in the 30th year of the Qianlong Emperor (1765). In the 49th year of the Qianlong Emperor (1784), after the official opening of Lukang, Changhua, Taiwan and the Han River in Quanzhou, Fujian as opposite ferries, "Hangjiao" began to flourish. However, the term "Hangjiao" is only found in the southern Minnan region. Due to the fact that most Kau merchants are shipping merchants, it is particularly prevalent in Taiwan, which relies on maritime trade.

According to research, the origin of the word "Kau" comes from the Ming dynasty. Zhu Zhanji established the 'tax pass' in the fourth year of Xuande Emperor (1429). The subsequent Qing government continued the system of setting up checkpoints for inspection and taxation at customs, originally referred to as "customs clearance". However, "customs clearance" also had the meaning of "doing business" in the Southern Fujian language. Therefore, in the future, the use of "Kau" in Taiwan gradually replaced "customs clearance".

== Classification ==
"Kau" is a collective term for various types of trade associations, often referred to as "chambers of commerce" during the Japanese colonial period in Taiwan. To explore the composition of commercial groups, the following table shows its division:

Kau	Inner Kau	A commercial group formed by businessmen in Taiwan
Kau	Outer Kau	A commercial group composed of businessmen traveling between mainland China and Taiwan Island
Kau	There is no conflict between inner and outer Kau businesses, and there are also cases of concurrent operations	

=== Synopsis ===
Name classification	Interpretation	General example	Notes
Selling projects	Using the same sales items as the classification standard	Youjiao	Import and export of peanut oil, sesame oil, etc.
Selling projects	Using the same sales items as the classification standard	Tangjiao	Import and export of sucrose, green sugar, etc.
Selling projects	Using the same sales items as the classification standard	Bujiao	Import and export of cotton, ramie cloth, jute cloth, cotton silk, etc.
Market region	Using the same regional market as a benchmark for differentiation	Taijun Jiao	The Kau of Tainan region
Market region	Using the same regional market as a benchmark for differentiation	Qianjiao	The Kau of Hsinchu Prefecture
Market region	Using the same regional market as a benchmark for differentiation	Xinmengquan Jiao	Xinzhuang and Mengjia's Kau
Specific regions	Benchmarking for markets operating in specific regions	Beijiao	A general term for operating Kau businesses in Tianjin, Yantai, Shanghai, and other places (Business scope is north of Taiwan Island)
Specific regions	Benchmarking for markets operating in specific regions	Nanjiao	A general term for operating Kau businesses in Fujian, Guangdong, Hong Kong, and other places (Business scope is located south of Taiwan Island)
Specific regions	Benchmarking for markets operating in specific regions	Lugang Jiao	A collective term for operating Kau businesses in various ports on Taiwan Island
Native place	Use the address standard based on the native place of the business person (Usually only a general term, often without formal organization)	Jianjiao and Minjiao	Merchants from Fujian
Native place	Use the address standard based on the native place of the business person (Usually only a general term, often without formal organization)	Ningjiao	Merchants from Ningbo
Native place	Use the address standard based on the native place of the business person (Usually only a general term, often without formal organization)	Shanghai Jiao	Merchants from Shanghai
Native place	Use the address standard based on the native place of the business person (Usually only a general term, often without formal organization)	Guangzhou Jiao and Guangdong Jiao	Merchants from Guangdong

== Organization ==
The "Kau" organization is operated by "Kau Members", who are further divided into "Lu Zhu" (爐主 in Chinese, means "Furnace owner".) and "Lu Ding" (爐丁 in Chinese, the word "Ding/丁" means "men" in general.). Before becoming a member, one has to pay a membership fee, and also indicate their detailed residence, store number, and amount of burden in the registration book to become a member of the Kau community (also known as furnace foot). The person in charge of all affairs is the "Lu Zhu" and if a "Lu Ding" wants to leave the Hangjiao, he must first notify the "Lu Zhu" and if the "Lu Ding" violates Kau regulations, the "Lu Zhu" also has the power to punish. In addition to the Kau business, furnace owners highly rely on maritime safety in their commercial activities and place special emphasis on the belief in the sea god. Therefore, they must hold an annual festival to pray for good weather. They generally choose to hold the festival on the 23rd day of the third month of the lunar calendar, on Mazu Day; or on the 5th day of the fifth month of the lunar calendar, on Shuixian Zunwang Day. On the day of the gathering, the furnace owner has the obligation to report to the furnace owner the income and expenditure of that year and the status of the surrounding area, and the furnace owner may raise opinions or questions regarding the furnace owner's report.

Organization chart of Kau travel in the Qing dynasty
Members	Matters	Position	Duties	Notes
Kau worker	General Kau affairs	Furnace owner	Responsible for overseeing all business activities in the Kau and handling sacrificial ceremonies for the year	Rotate the bamboo shoot every year
Kau worker	General Kau affairs	Director	Also known as "eader", responsible for specific businesses	Sometimes he serves as the furnace owner
Kau worker	General Kau affairs	Copywriter	Write written articles for various Kau affairs	
Kau worker	General Kau affairs	Da Zhuo	Collect money for the Kau and carry out various official duties	
Kau worker	General Kau affairs	Bureau Ding	Handle various miscellaneous tasks	
Kau worker	Ceremonial assembly	Furnace owner	During the ritual gathering, it is necessary to report the income and expenditure, Kau affairs, and other statuses of the year	Also known as "sacrificial lord"
Kau worker	Ceremonial assembly	First chief	Assist the furnace owner in handling the ritual assembly	Selected from the Lu Ding
Kau worker	Ceremonial assembly	Deputy signature	Assist the furnace owner in handling the ritual assembly	Selected from the Lu Ding
Kau worker	Ceremonial assembly	Lu Ding	You must dress neatly to attend the banquet at the ceremony	

== Funding ==
Kau is a commercial organization that can only operate with funding raised by various parties. Due to the low efficiency of local governments in the Qing dynasty, it was also common for members of Kau merchants to take over social welfare, restrain the villagers, and even contribute to the formation of militia groups and the defense of the village (such as the Lin Shuangwen rebellion and Cai Qian events, where Kau merchants contributed to the war). Therefore, the operation of Kau funds has a significant impact on a single settlement.

Income
Project	Details	Interpretation	Notes
Contribution	Insert Lu Yin	Admission fee	During the God's Birthday celebration, all Kau residents also need to share the cost of the celebration equally
Assessment	Goods tax	Divide according to the annual distribution of goods	The main source of income in the Kau areas
Assessment	Ship tax	Score based on the carrying capacity of each vessel	The main source of income in the Kau areas
Property purchase	To purchase a property or storefront on behalf of Kau and rent it out, the interest earned is usually used as public funds		
Fine	Firms that violate Kau regulations shall pay a fine, but it is non-fixed income		

Expenditure
Project		Interpretation
Annual sacrifice		At the ceremony, the purpose of inviting performances to reward gods and gather for meals is mainly through purchasing property and generating interest. There are account books available for Kau verification
Employee salary		Regular salaries for staff such as copywriters, Da Zhuo, and Bureau Ding
Official duties	Corvee service	The business that originally belonged to local officials, such as building bridges, paving roads, and cities, required the recruitment of manpower for corvee work. Kau merchants usually paid money to offset the corvee work
Official duties	Social good	Local public welfare donations, such as donations for childcare centers, academies, temple incense, distribution of rice, and other public welfare undertakings
Other miscellaneous branches		1. Miscellaneous items such as tea, paper, ink, candles, oil lamps, etc. in the office area 2. Lu Ding borrows public funds to turn over the cash 3. The official funds are deposited in the outskirts of the bank, and interest-bearing funds are required

== Trade name ==
"Kau" generally refers to a collective name, such as "Quanjiao", which can be seen in Lukang, Beigang, or Tainan. There is a "trade name" in the Kau community, which is the trade name actually operated by businessmen. The business name "Jinshi Shun" is located in the "Quanjiao" area of Yunlin Beigang, "Jinjin Shun" is located in the "Quanjiao" area of Bang-kah, Taipei, and "Jin Chang Shun" is located in the "Quanjiao" area of Lukang, Changhua. It once had as many as 200 stores under its umbrella. In addition, due to the fact that business locations often straddle different counties, even the same trade name may be given different Kau names in different places. Taking the trade name "Jin Changshun" as an example, it is classified as "Quanjiao" in Lukang, but "Tâi-ē-kau" in Penghu.

Before the Qing dynasty opened up Taiwan for port trade, there were many well-known Kau commercial organizations throughout Taiwan, among which the "Tainan 3 Kaus", "Lukang 8 Kaus", and "Tamsui 3 Kaus" were more well-known. The Kau merchants also clashed with each other due to disputes over interests and differences in provincial affiliation, with the most representative being the "Top Down Kau Competition" in the third year of Xianfeng (1853).

== Decline ==
Although Kau was a popular commercial organization during the Qing dynasty, it ultimately declined due to environmental and social changes. The reasons for its decline are as follows:

1. Social unrest: Taiwan is a transitional society, with varying qualities of officials and soldiers, frequent armed conflicts, and civil commotions. Whenever the people cause chaos, not only are the streets affected by war and property damage, but also economic losses for Kau merchants.
2. Insufficient effectiveness of regulations: Although Kau employees are subject to Kau regulations, the government rarely interferes with Kau business, and lacks third-party discretion and enforcement units for those who violate Kau regulations, resulting in the inability of Kau regulations to effectively restrain Kau employees, which is like a written document. However, if there are offenders, they still jointly damage the reputation of Kau.
3. Shipping risks: Although the profits of shipping are large, the uncertainties along the way, such as climate, walrus, and reefs, are also high. Once there is a shipwreck, the damage to the ship will also be very heavy. (Note: According to a study by Taiwanese scholar Dai Baocun, the manufacturing cost of a Rongke sailboat with a capacity of one thousand stones was approximately 2000 taels in the 1890s, which is roughly similar to the cost of opening a store.)
4. The demand of petty officials: When merchant ships enter and exit ports, they often face the corrupt practice of demanding bribes from petty officials, which is called "regulatory etiquette". The amount of regulatory etiquette, even publicly accepted, has become a norm, and in the long run, it is not conducive to commercial development.
5. Port congestion: Ports such as Lukang, Beigang, Bali, and Anping have all faced the problem of river blockage, resulting in previously developed commercial ports becoming abandoned ports unable to engage in large-scale shipping.
6. Establishment of Foreign Banks: In the eighth year of the Xianfeng Emperor (1858), after the Qing government signed the Treaty of Tientsin, ports in various parts of Taiwan were gradually opened, and foreign banks were established to compete with Kau merchants. With the advantages of ship cargo capacity and politics, foreign banks still used Junk (ship), which were limited by climate and power, making it difficult for them to compete with foreign merchants for business.

In the early days of the Taiwan under Japanese rule, the Japanese government continued to trade with Xiamen and other places in Fujian through local Kau pipelines. It was not until the outbreak of the Second Sino-Japanese War in 1937 that the Japanese government restricted trade with China's coastal ports, which in turn affected the contraction of Kau export trade volume. After 1949, there was a prolonged military confrontation between the two sides of the Taiwan Strait, which led to future decline and even dissolution. However, due to the frequent merging of office guilds organized by Kau organizations for use in temples, a few Kau organizations, such as the Penghu Shuixian Temple in Penghu and the Narcissus Palace in Tainan, still have preserved the original sacrificial functions of Kau organizations to this day.

== See also ==
- Hong (business)
- Penghu Shuixian Temple

== Extended Books ==
- 林玉茹，《向海立生：清代臺灣的港口、人群與社會》，台北市：聯經出版，2023年3月23日。ISBN 9789570864335
