= Magong Chenghuang Temple =

Temple in Taiwan

Coordinates: 23°33′59″N 119°33′59″E

Magong Chenghuang Temple Magong City God Temple
- 媽宮城隍廟
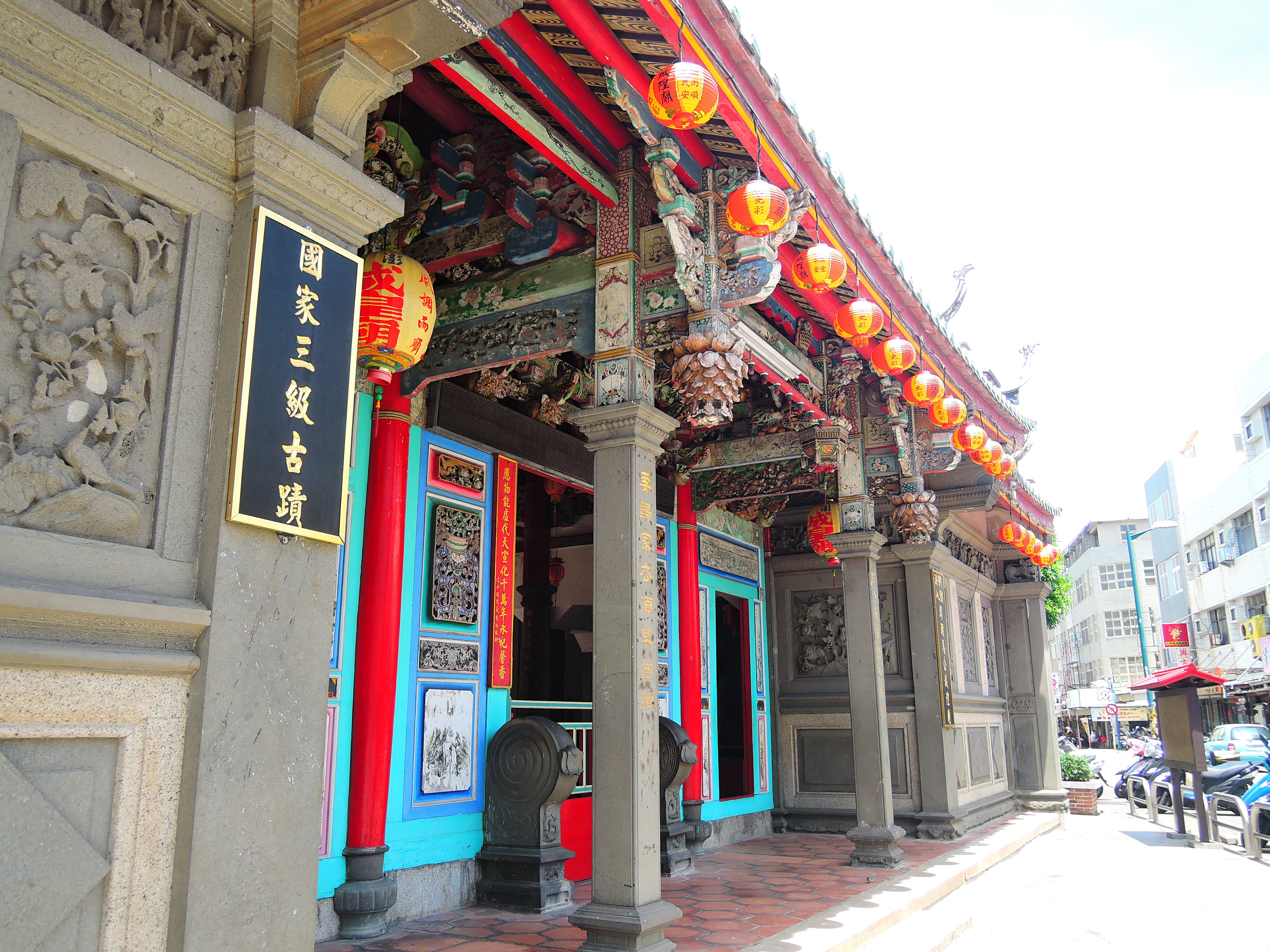

Religion
- Affiliation: Taoism

Location
- Location: 20 Guangming Rd., Magong City, Penghu County 880
- Interactive map of Magong Chenghuang Temple; Magong City God Temple

Architecture
- Founder: Xie Wei-Qi (謝維祺)
- Completed: 1779

Magong Chenghuang Temple (Chinese: 媽宮城隍廟; pinyin: Māgōng Chénghuáng Miào) is a temple in Magong, Penghu, Taiwan. This temple mainly serves Chenghuangye (Chinese: 城隍爺; pinyin: Chéng-huáng-yé transl. the Lord of City), a Taoist God in charge of the underworld of an administrative district (similar to Hades).

== History ==
Traditionally, only one Chenghuang Temple was placed in each county or city, next to the city hall. An exception to this is in Penghu County, which hosts two Chenghuang temples. The original city hall of Penghu (澎湖廳署) was located at Wenao (文澳) district, where the Chenghuang Temple was built.

As Wenao Chenghuang Temple was too small to allow its residents to fully express their respect, in 1777, Xie Wei-Qi (Chinese: 謝維祺; pinyin: Xiè wéi qí ), an officer of Penghu (澎湖海防糧補通判) during the Qing Dynasty, suggested the establishment of another temple in the Magong harbour area. The new temple was completed in 1779.

The temple was damaged during the Sino-French War in 1885. It was said that Chenghuangye was seen protecting people from war and insecurity. After the war and as the French navy retreated in the autumn of 1885, Chenghuang Temple was repaired. According to folk stories, Guangxu Emperor promoted Magong Chenghuangye's religious rank in 1886.

Afterwards, Magong Chenghuangye was named Lin Ying Hou (Chinese: 靈應侯; pinyin: líng yīng hóu). The first character, Lin (靈), means "spirit"; the second character, Ying (應), means "feel" or "answer"; the third character, Hou (侯), means "one of ranks of Chinese nobilIty". Together, Lin Ying Hou (靈應侯) means "this lord of god will show its spirit to answer you", or "you can feel the spirit appear".

== Architecture and art ==
Magong Chenghuang Temple has collected many beautiful wooden carvings, colorful paintings, and historic sign boards and steles.

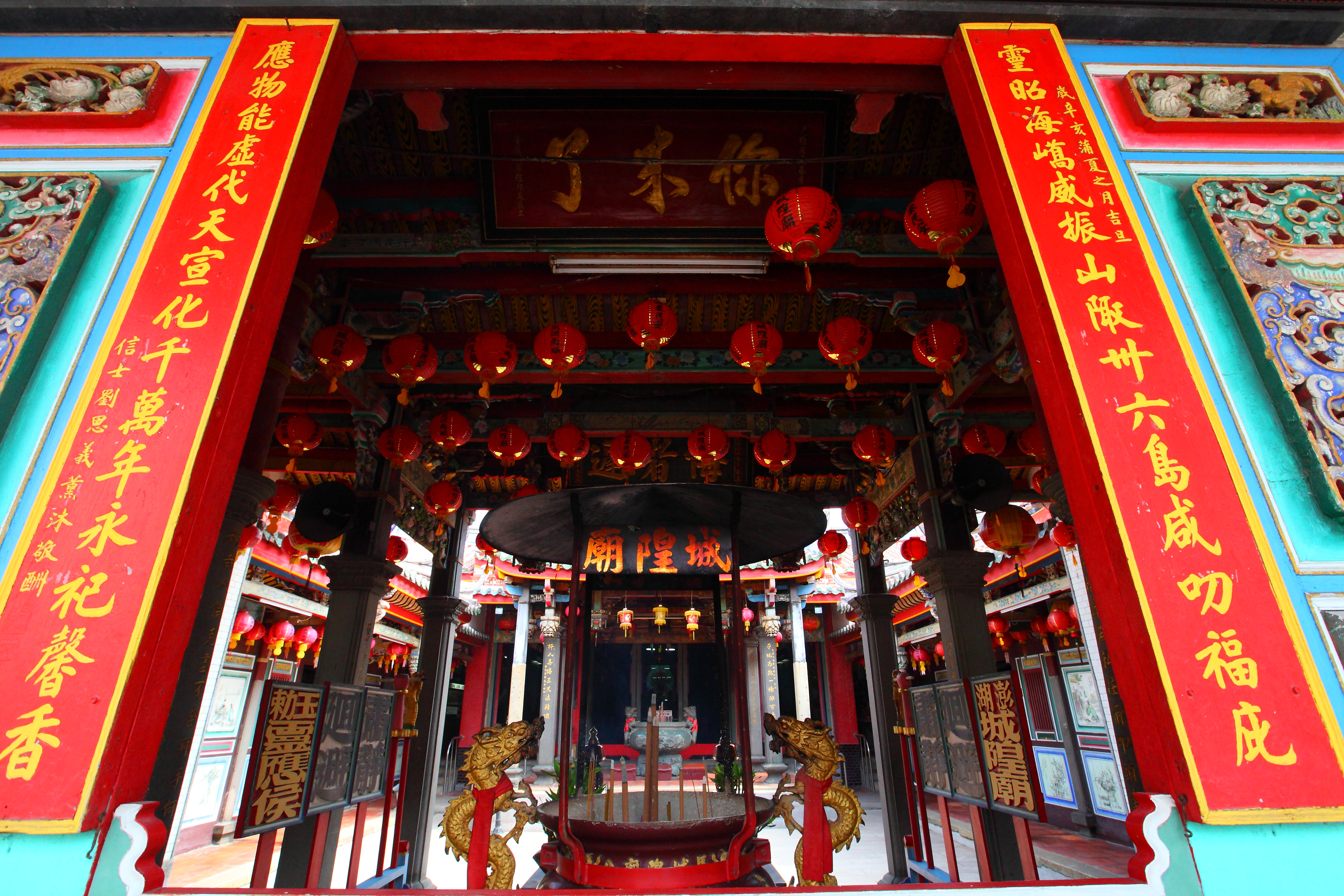
The Gate of the Temple.

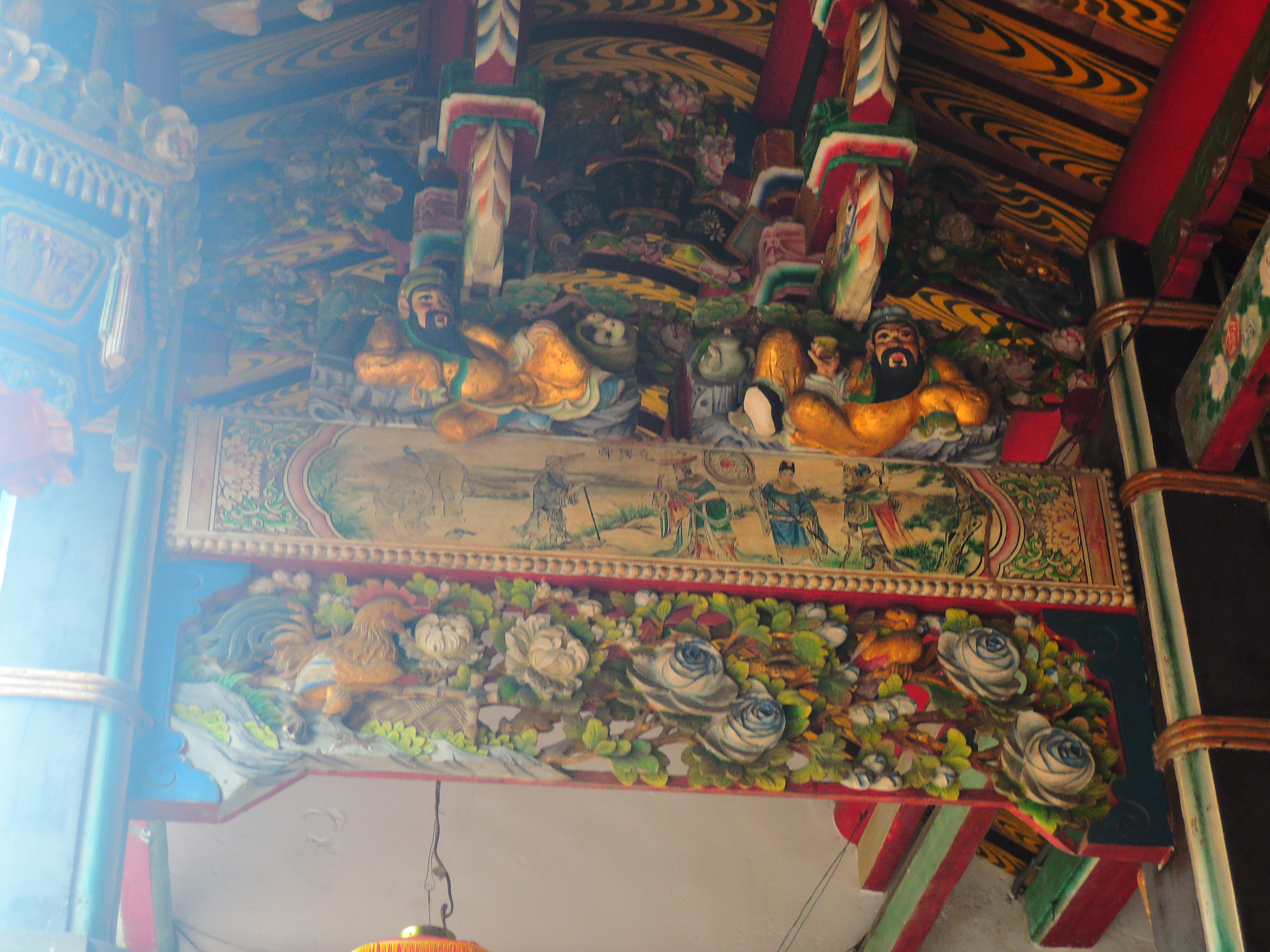
The Painting of Beams

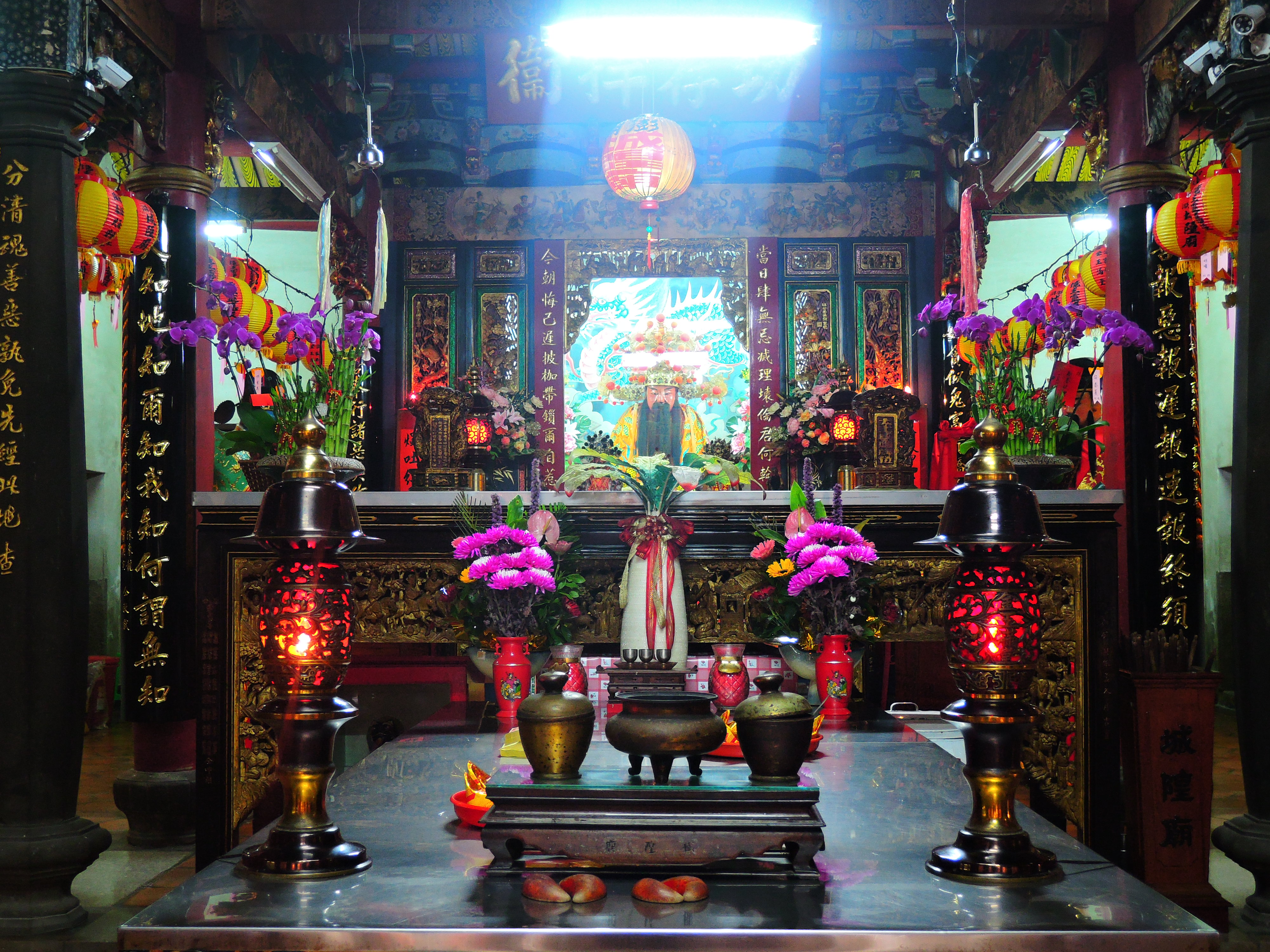
Main Hall

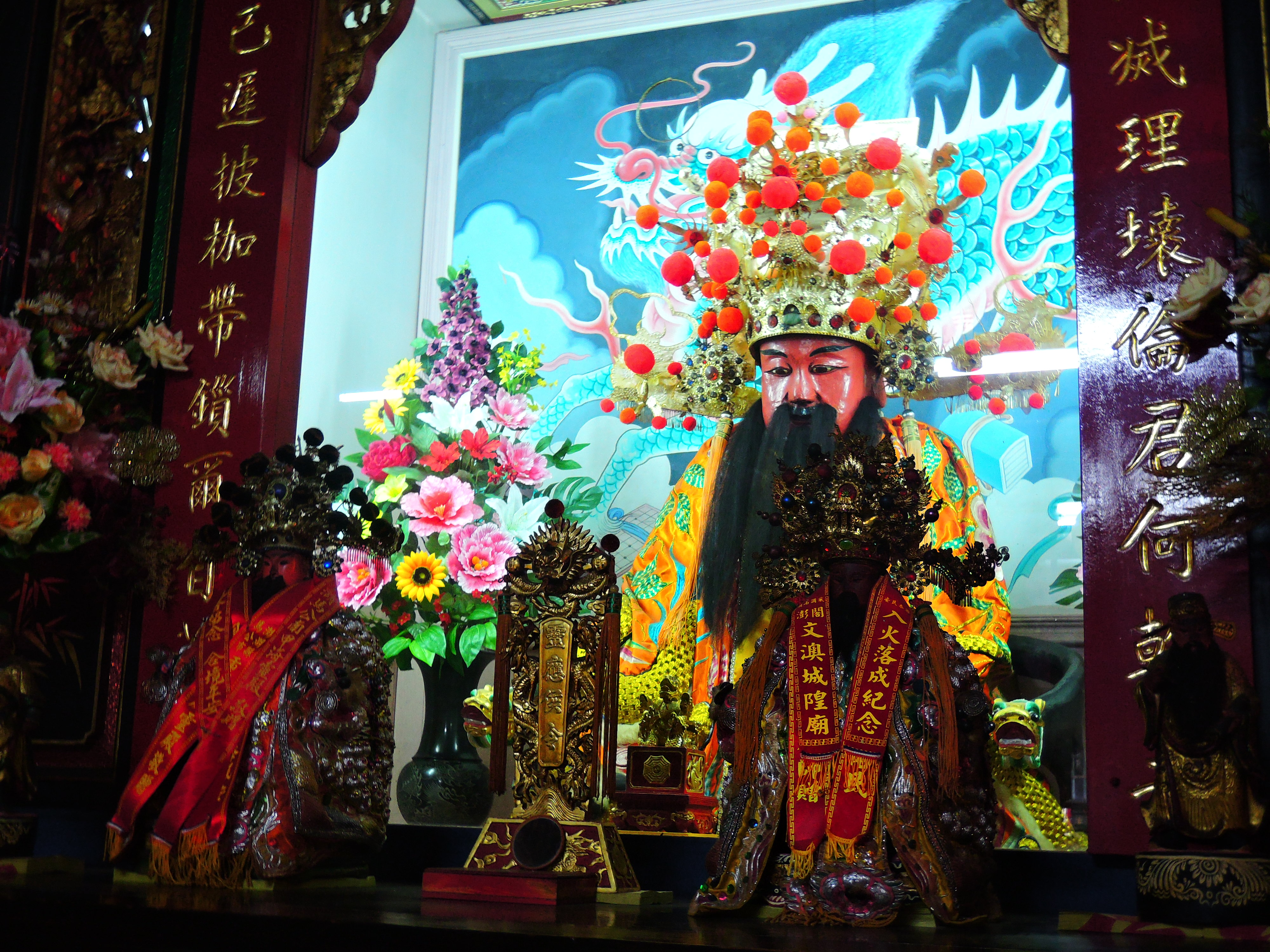
Chenghuangye (City God)
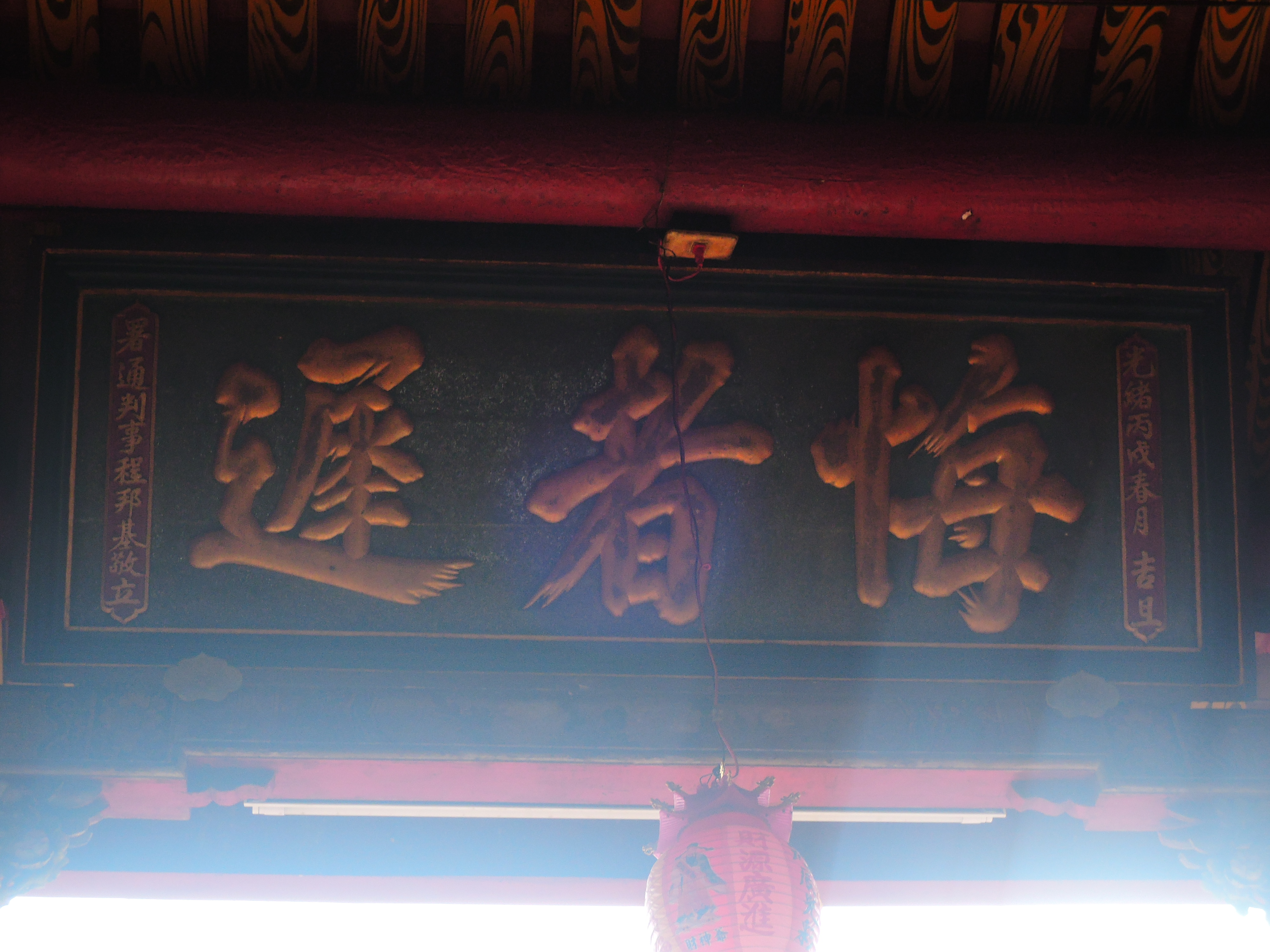
Sign saying "Repentance comes too late."

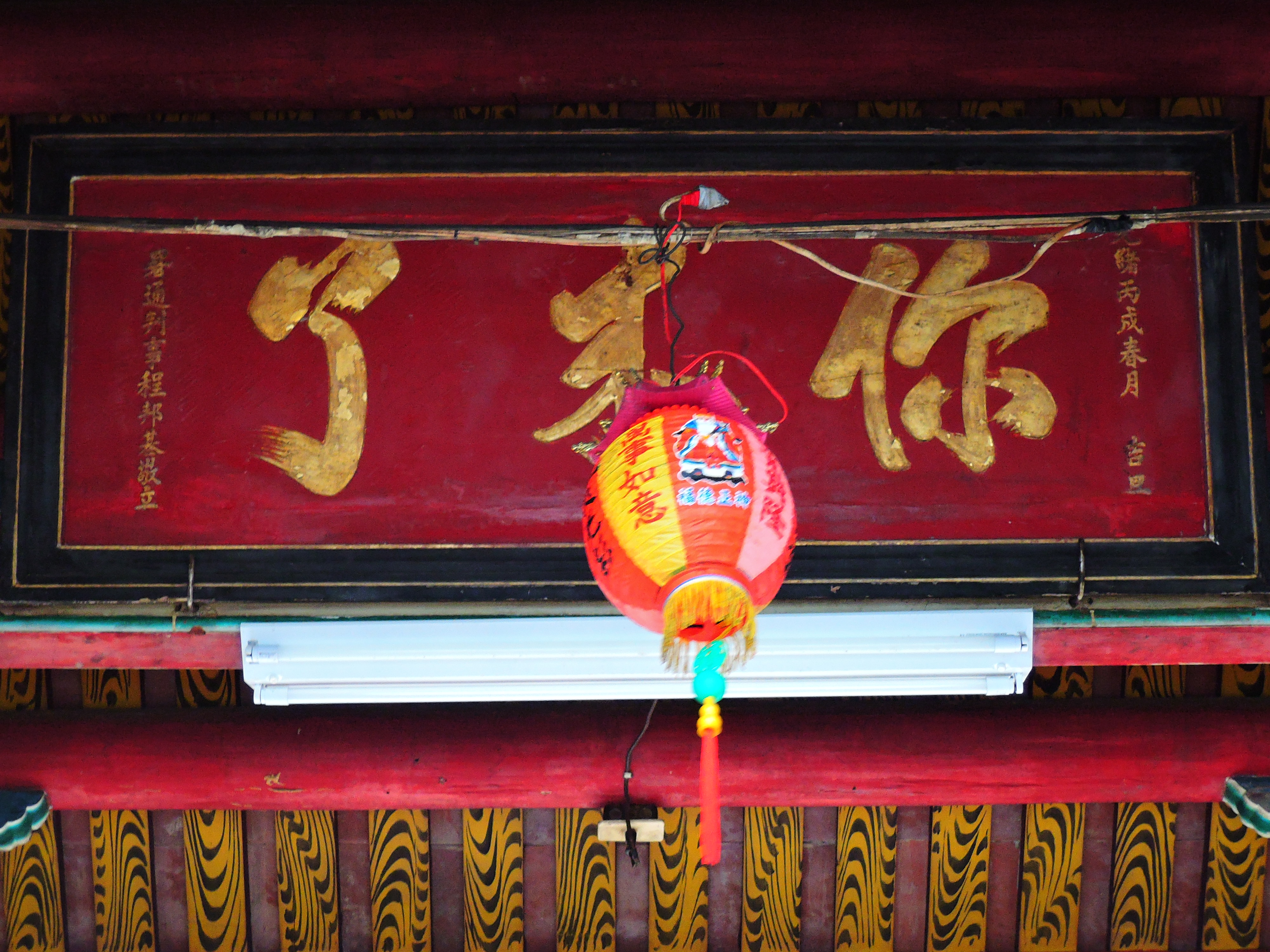
Sign saying "You come."

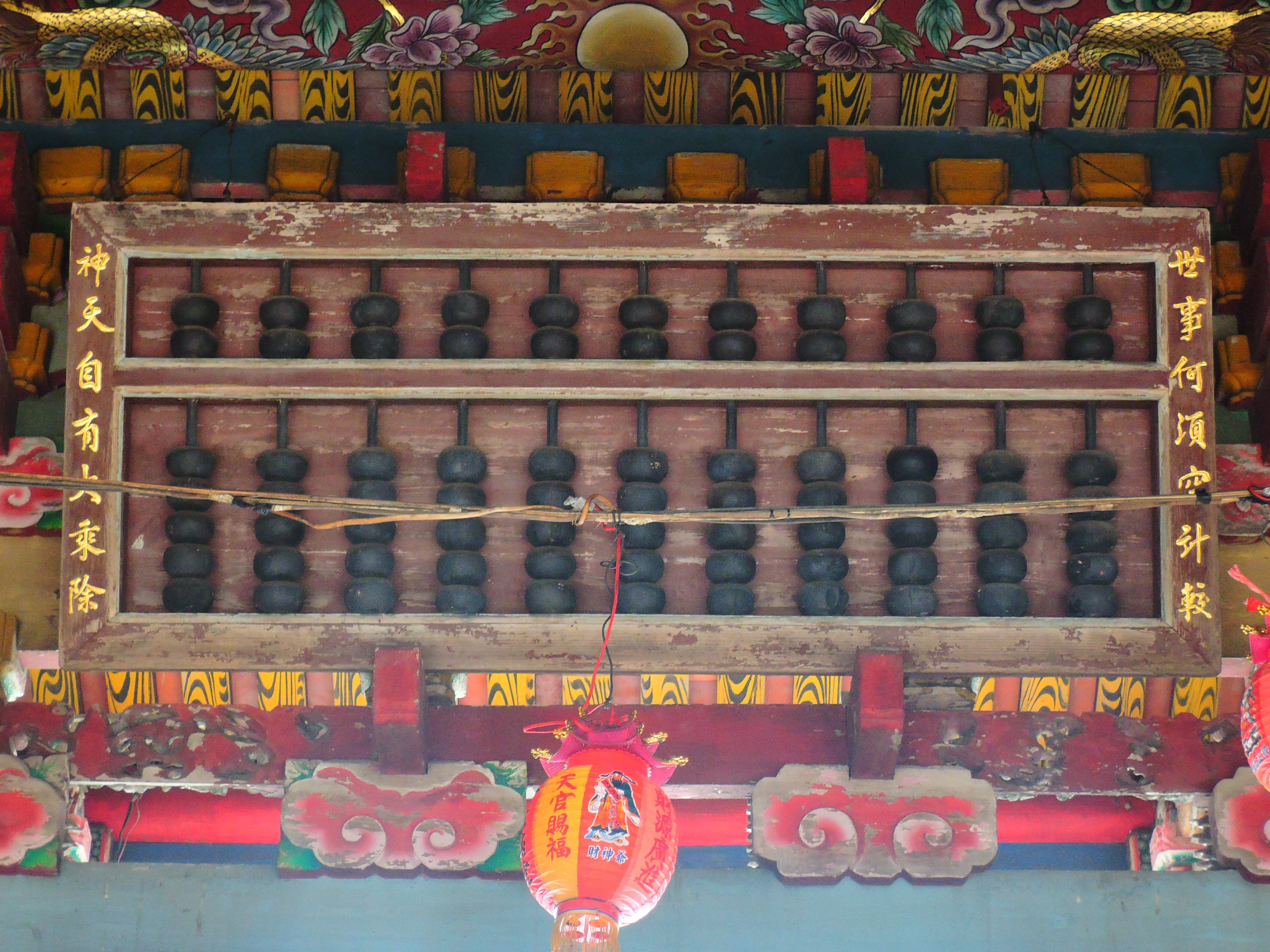
Abacus for calculating one's kindness and guild during their life.

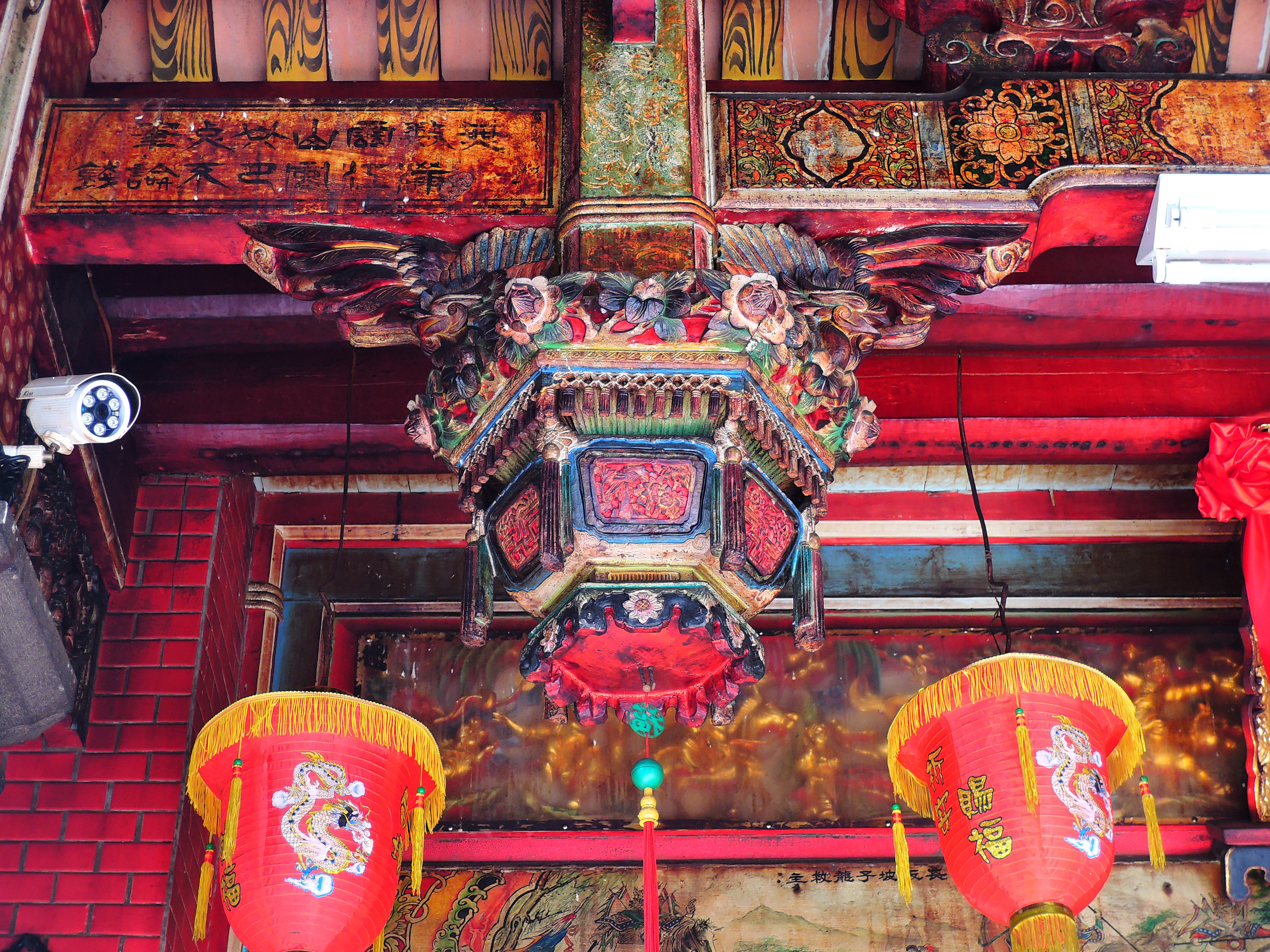
The Painting of Architecture.

== See also ==
- Penghu Mazu Temple
- Penghu Guanyin Temple
- Magong Beiji Temple
- Penghu Shuixian Temple
- List of temples in Taiwan
