= Penghu Shuixian Temple =

Taoist temple in Penghu, Taiwan

Penghu Shuixian Temple Taixiajiao Kongsi
- 澎湖水仙宮、臺廈郊會館
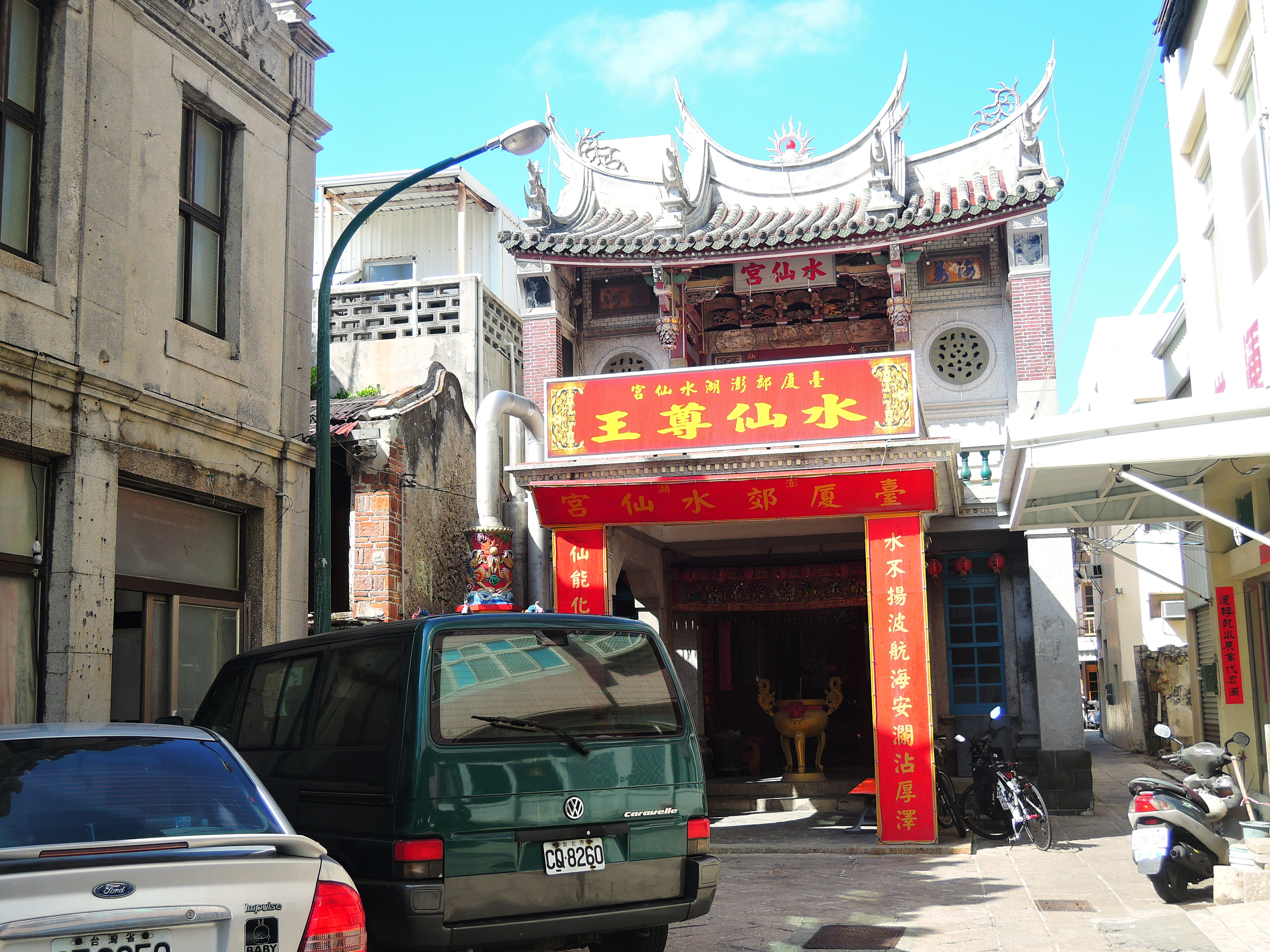

Religion
- Affiliation: Taoism

Location
- Location: No. 6, Lane 9, Zhongshan Road, Magong City, Penghu County, Taiwan
- Interactive map of Penghu Shuixian Temple; Taixiajiao Kongsi

Architecture
- Founder: Xue Kui (薛奎)
- Completed: 1696 (Kangxi 35th year, Qing Dynasty)

Penghu Shuixian Temple (Chinese: 澎湖水仙宮; pinyin: Pēnghú Shuǐxiān Gōng) is a Taoist temple in Magong, Penghu. Built in 1696 by Xue Kui (薛奎), a military officer of Penghu Navy, it mainly serves the Shuixian Zunwang, five Taoist immortals worshipped as sea gods.

This building is also called as "Taixiajiao Kongsi" (Chinese:臺廈郊會館; pinyin:Tái xià jiāo huìguǎn) because it was used as a commercial hall which dealt with the trading between Taiwan main island and Xiamen during the late of Qing Dynasty. According to the Chorography of Penghu, Shuixian Temple is one of 4 ancient temples in Penghu County.

== History ==
After Xue Kui built this temple in 1696, Shuixian Temple also was erected on 1780 and 1821, according to the Chorography of Penghu by Lin Hao (Chinese:林豪; pinyin: Lín háo).

In 1875, there were many local merchants who organized a company (Taixiajiao Kongsi), which was responsible for the business or coordination. The merchants donated the rebuilding of Penghu Shuixian Temple, therefore, their kongsi merged with the temple.

This temple was set up as two-storied house on 1929 (Shōwa the 4th year, Empire of Japan). That time, this building was separated into two different functions, merchants used the 1st floor as their office, and the 2nd floor still kept the space of religion.

== Gallery ==
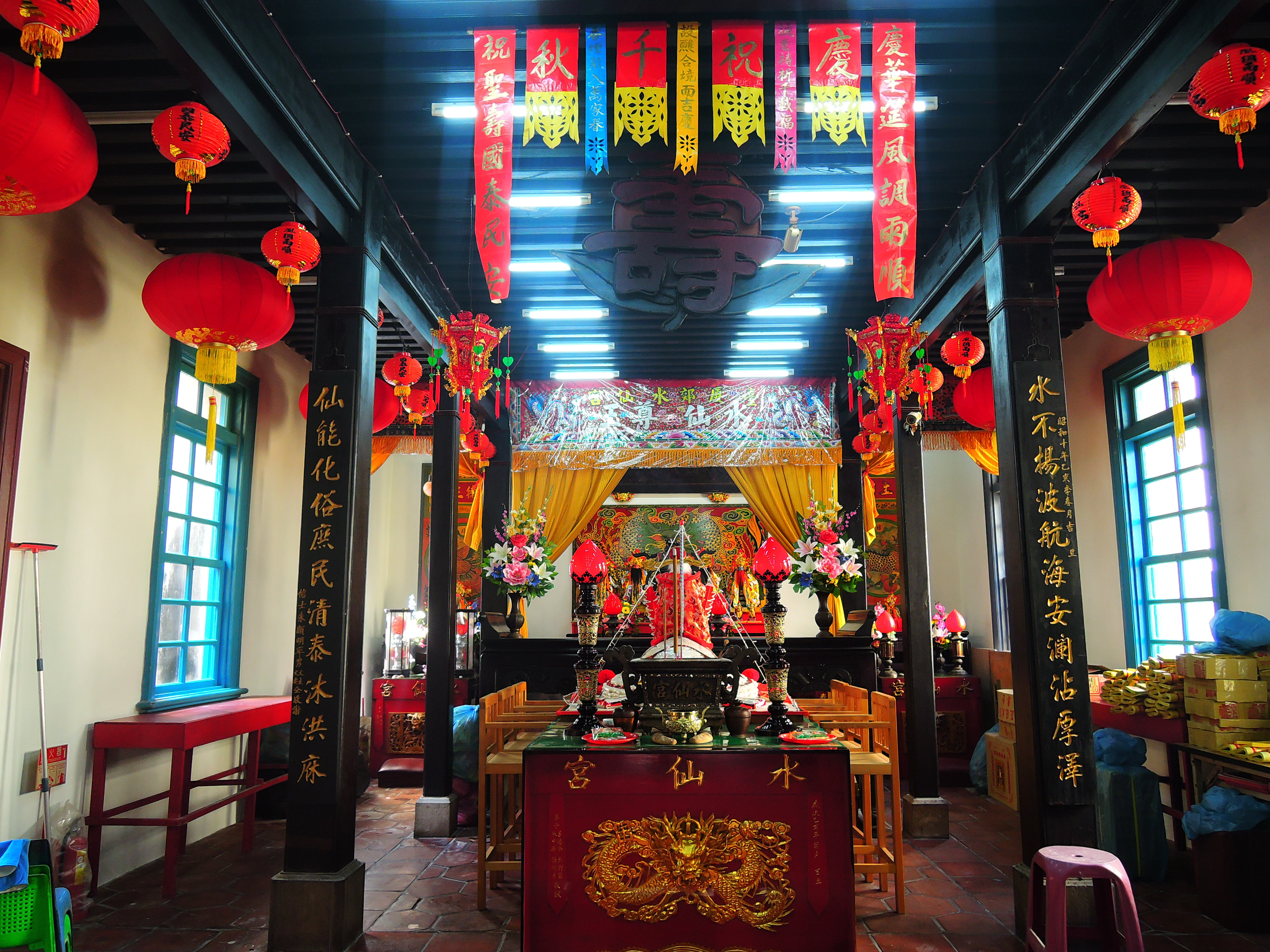

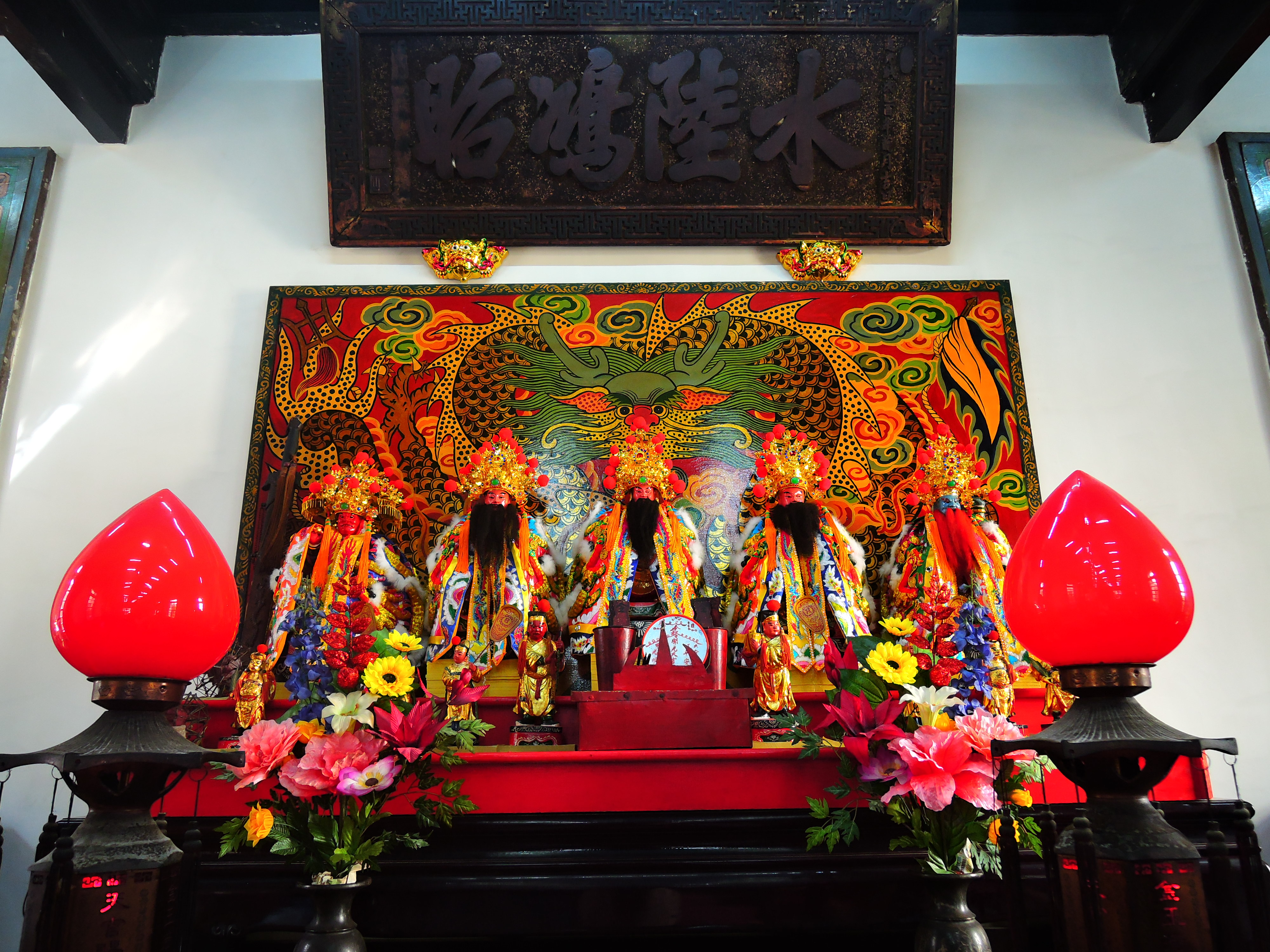

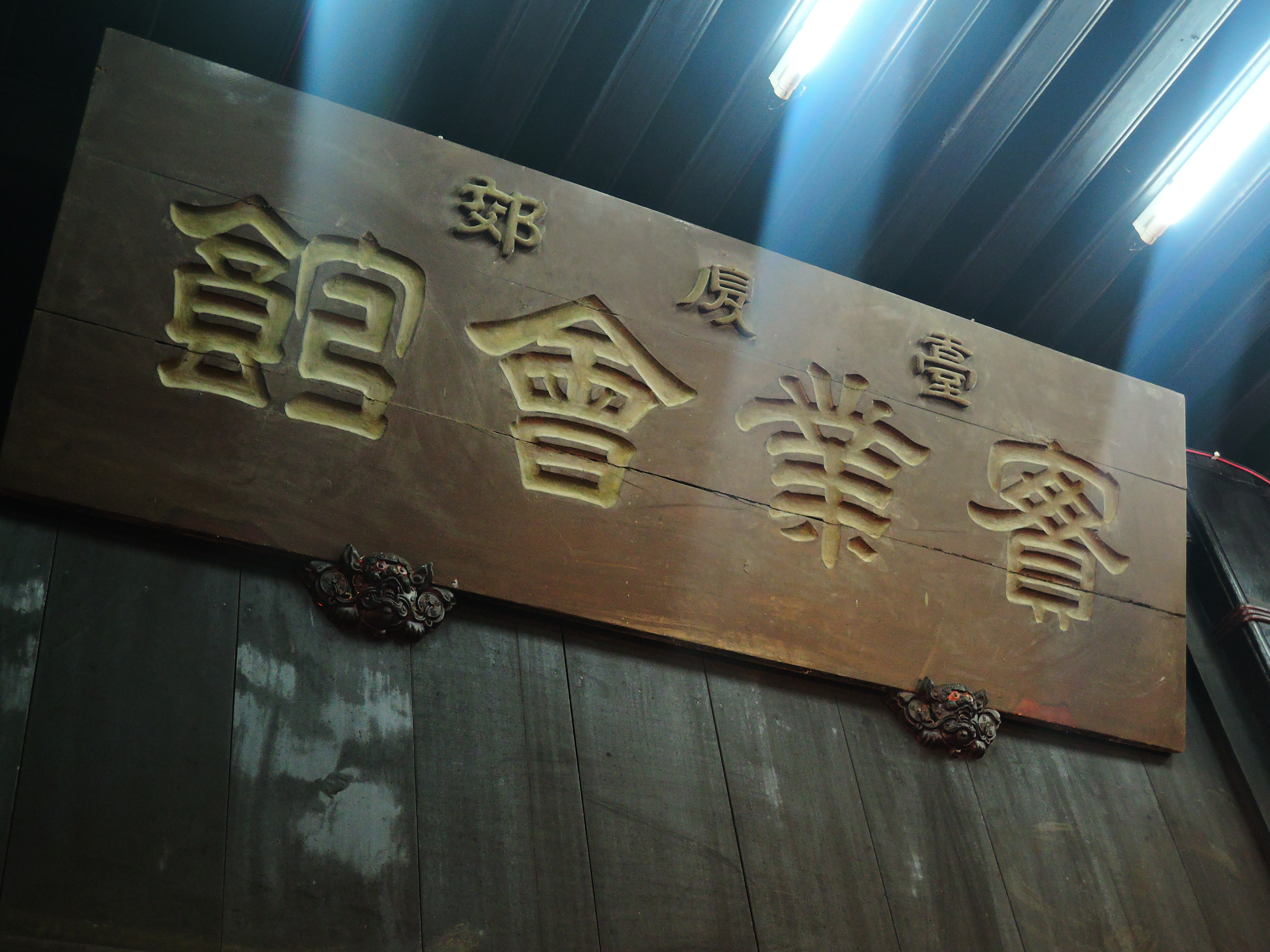

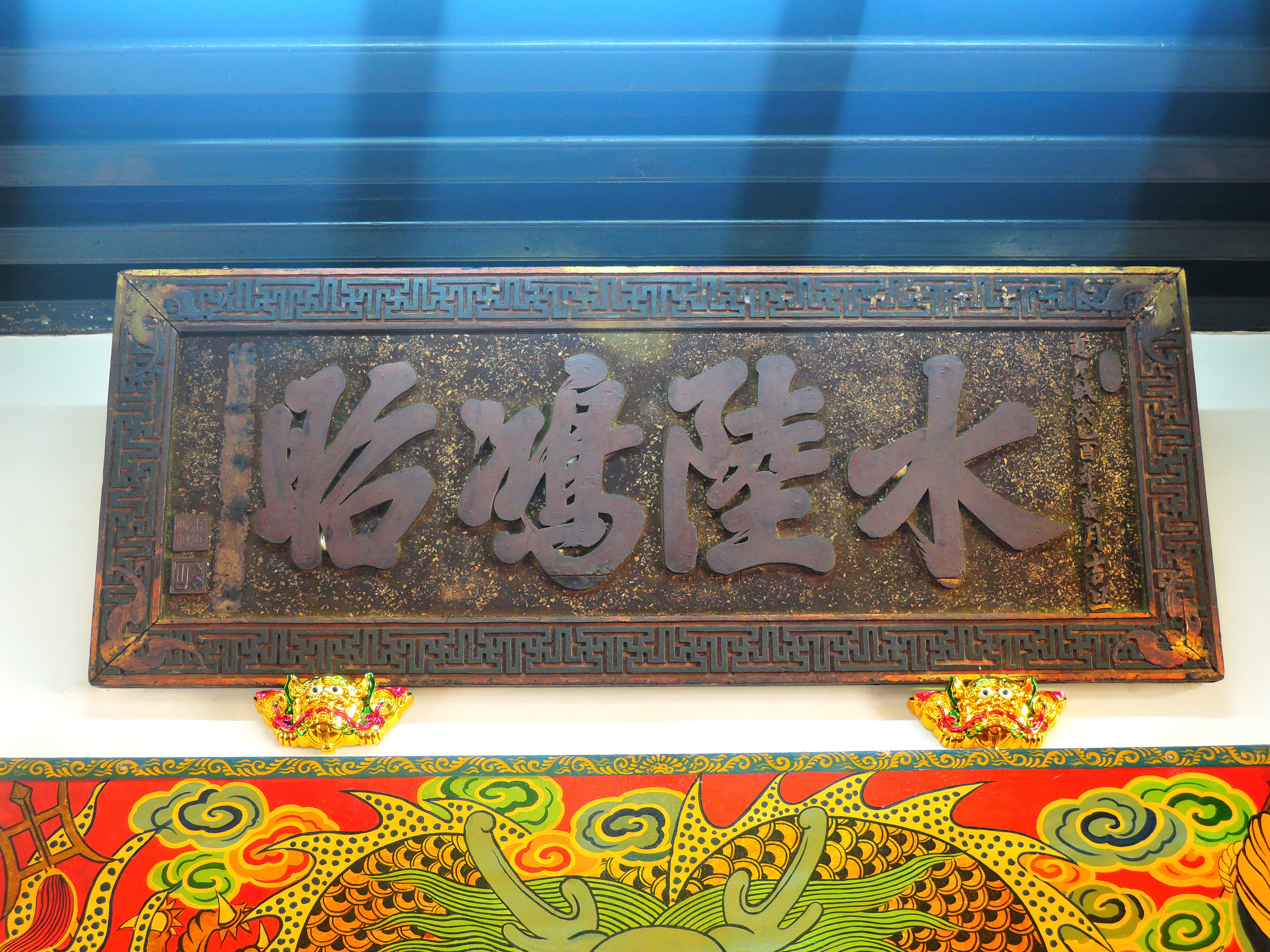

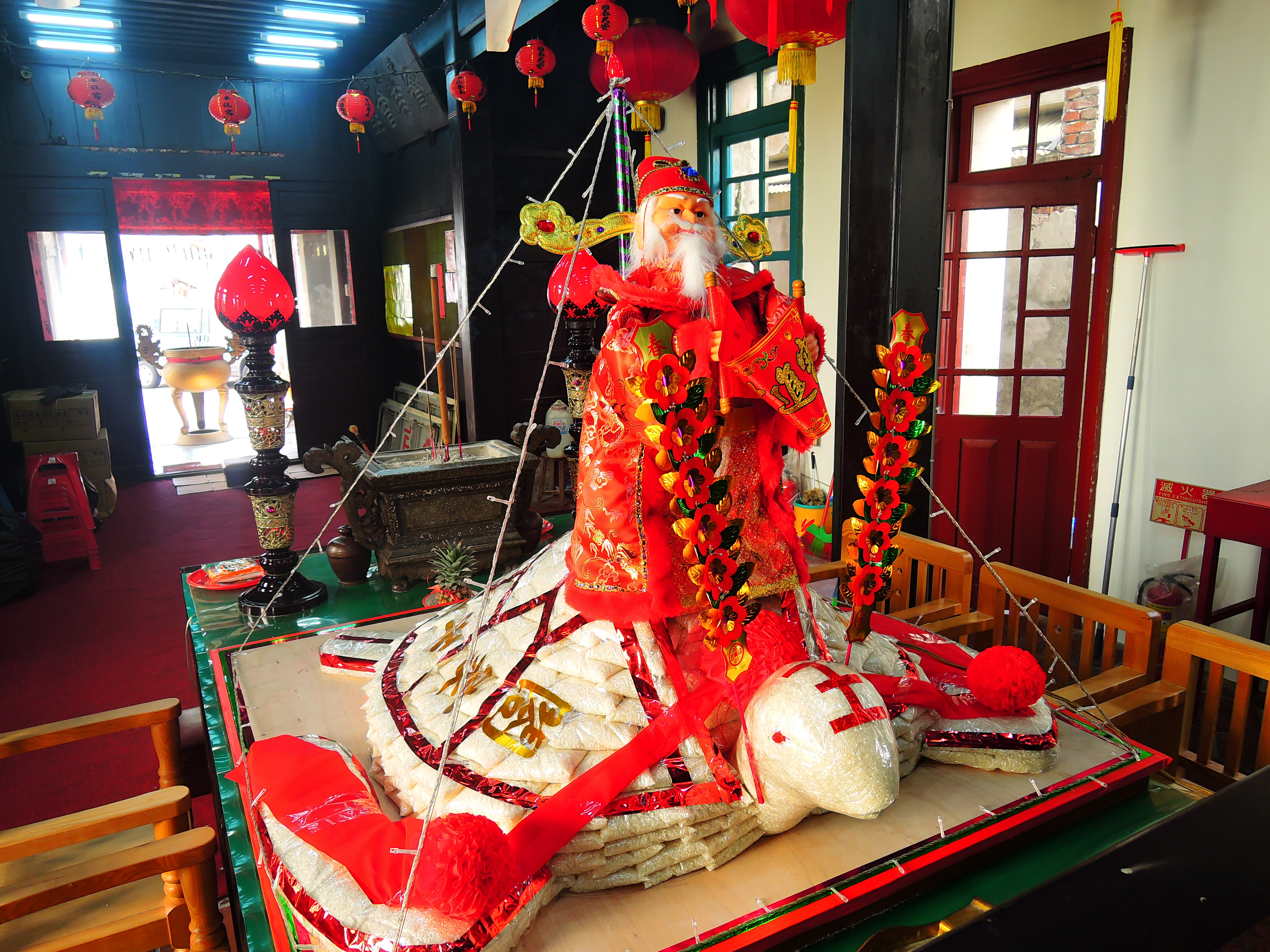
Rice Turtle (Lantern Festival)

== See also ==
- Shuixian Zunwang
- Magong Mazu Temple
- Magong Beiji Temple
- Magong Chenghuang Temple
- Penghu Guanyin Temple
- List of temples in Taiwan
- Jiao (commercial guild)
