= Lu Ban =

5th-century BC Chinese engineer and inventor

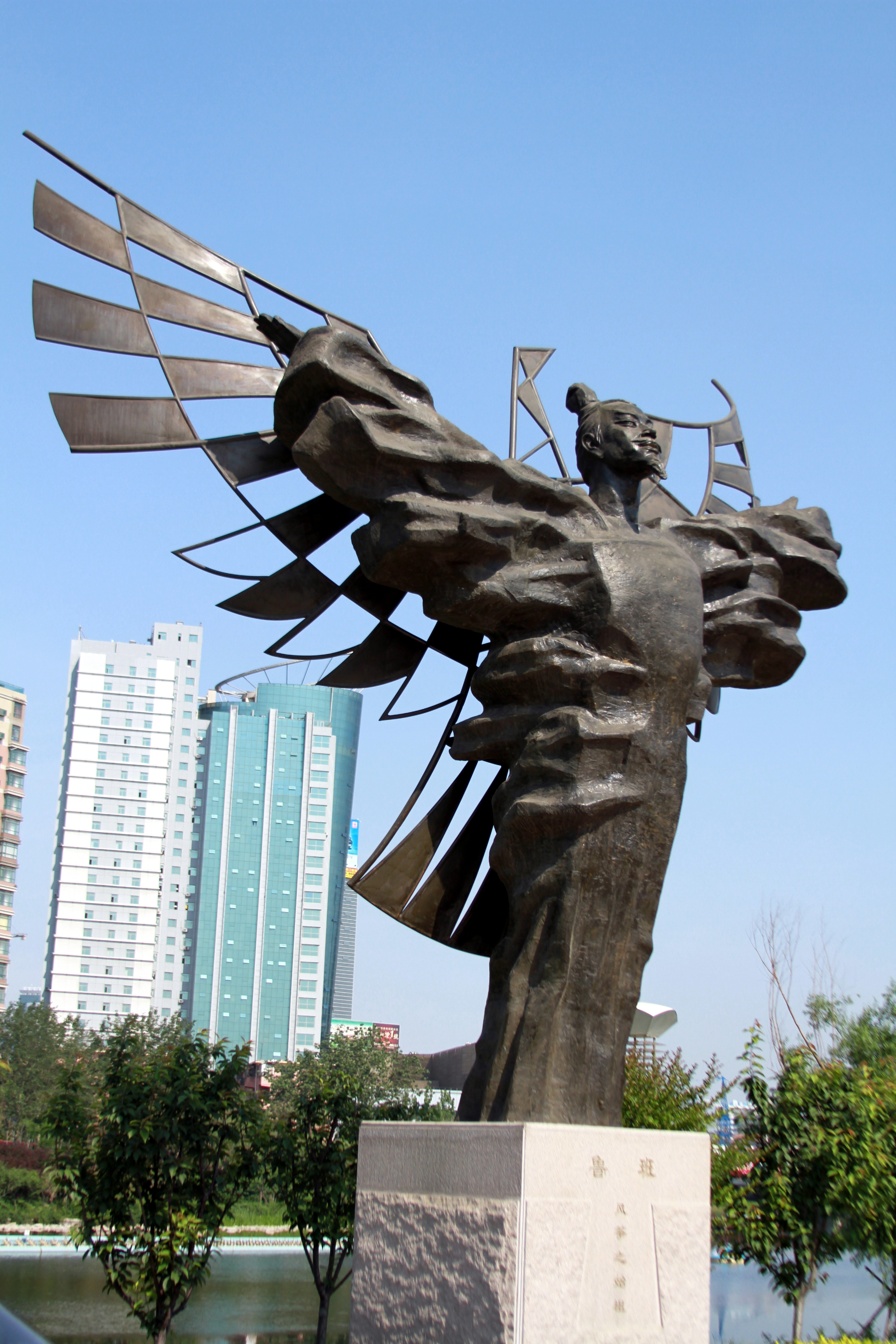
- Sculpture of Lu Ban in Weifang
- Traditional Chinese: 魯班
- Simplified Chinese: 鲁班
Transcriptions
Standard Mandarin
- Hanyu Pinyin: Lǔ Bān
- Wade–Giles: Lu Pan

Gongshu Yizhi
- Traditional Chinese: 公輸依智
- Simplified Chinese: 公输依智
Transcriptions
Standard Mandarin
- Hanyu Pinyin: Gōngshū Yīzhì
- Wade–Giles: Kung-shu I-chih

Gongshu Ban
- Traditional Chinese: 公輸班 公輸般
- Simplified Chinese: 公输班 公输般
Transcriptions
Standard Mandarin
- Hanyu Pinyin: Gōngshū Bān
- Wade–Giles: Kung-shu Pan

Gongshu Pan
- Traditional Chinese: 公輸盤
- Simplified Chinese: 公输盘
Transcriptions
Standard Mandarin
- Hanyu Pinyin: Gōngshū Pán
- Wade–Giles: Kung-shu P'an

Lu Ban (Note: Known as Lo Pan in Cantonese contexts. Sometimes spelled as Lu Pan.) (c. 507–444 BC) was an ancient Chinese master carpenter, architect, structural engineer and inventor during the Spring and Autumn period of the Eastern Zhou Dynasty. He is revered as the Chinese Deity (Patron) of builders and contractors.

== Life ==
Lu Ban was born in the state of Lu; a few sources claim he was born further to the west, in Dunhuang, to a family of carpenters or artisans during the Spring and Autumn period of the Zhou dynasty. His original name was Gongshu Yizhi. He was also referred to as Gongshu Ban or Pan. He was supposed to have been an indifferent pupil until his love of learning was kindled by the scholar Zi Xia. He later learned woodworking from Bao Laodong. The great demand for his work supposedly compelled him to invent or improve several carpenter's tools—the saw, the square, the planer, the drill, the shovel, and an ink marking tool—to complete his many projects more quickly. His wife was also credited with inventing the umbrella in order to permit him to work in inclement weather.

== Inventions ==
According to tradition, he was responsible for several inventions:

- Cloud ladder—a mobile, counterweighted siege ladder. (Note: 公輸盤爲楚造雲梯之械，成，將以攻宋。 "Gongshu Ban had completed the construction of Cloud ladders for the State of Chu and was going to attack the State of Song with them.")
- Grappling hooks and ram—implements for naval warfare. (Note: 公輸子自魯南遊楚，焉始爲舟戰之器，作爲鉤強之備，退者鉤之，進者強之，量其鉤強之長，而製爲之兵。楚之兵節，越之兵不節，楚人因此若埶，亟敗越人。 "Gongshuzi came south from the State of Lu to the State of Chu, and began making implements for naval warfare which consisted of grappling hooks and rams. When the enemy were retreating they used the hooks. And when the enemy were advancing they employed the rams. And the weapons were made according to the length of these hooks and rams. The weapons of the State of Chu thus were all standardized, and those of the State of Yue were not. And, with this advantage, the people of Chu greatly defeated the people of Yue.")
- Wooden bird—a non-powered, flying, wooden bird which could stay in the air for three days. It has been suggested to be a prototype of a kite. (Note: 公輸子削竹木以為鵲，成而飛之，三日不下。 "Gongshuzi constructed a bird from bamboo and wood and when it was completed he flew it. It stayed up [in the air] for three days.")
- The saw—legend has it that when Lu Ban was grabbing hold of tree trunks in order to climb a steep slope while gathering firewood, his hand was cut by a leaf with spiny texture. He then realized that he could turn the leaf's texture into a more efficient tool for tree-cutting, namely the saw.
- The Lu Ban lock— a toy made of six interlocking wooden sticks using mortise techniques.

Other inventions were also attributed to him, such as a lifting implement to assist with burial, a wooden horse carriage and coachman, a pedal-powered cycle, and other woodworking mentioned in various texts, which thereafter led Lu Ban to be acknowledged as a master craftsman:

- The Book of Lineages (Shiben), written c. the 3rd century BC.
- The Tales of the Marvelous (述異記), by Ren Fang, written c. the 5th century AD.
- The Records of Origin on Things and Affairs (事物紀原), by Gao Cheng, written c. the 11th century.
- The Origin on Things (物原), by Luo Qi, written c. the 15th century.
- The Treatise of Lu Ban (魯班經), attributed to Lu Ban, written in the 13th, 14th, or 15th century.

== Legacy ==
Lu Ban is revered as the god of carpentry and masonry in Chinese folk religion. His personality is assumed by the master carpenter involved in the construction of houses among the Kam people. He is sometimes counted among the Five Kings of the Water Immortals, Taoist water gods invoked by sailors for protection while carrying out journeys.

He is referenced in a number of Chinese idioms. The Chinese equivalent of "teaching one's grandmother to suck eggs" is to "brandish one's axe at Lu Ban's door" (班门弄斧). His cultural companion is the stone worker Wang Er, who lived around the same time.

The Lu Ban Ruler (魯班尺) is used in feng shui practices.

The modern artist Shi Lu has claimed that Lu Ban was an alias of his contemporary Confucius, but this seems dubious.

== See also ==
- Shuixian Zunwang
- Lo Pan Temple, Kennedy Town, Hong Kong
- Pisatao
