= 7th century BC =

One hundred years, from 700 BC to 601 BC

The 7th century BC began the first day of 700 BC and ended the last day of 601 BC.

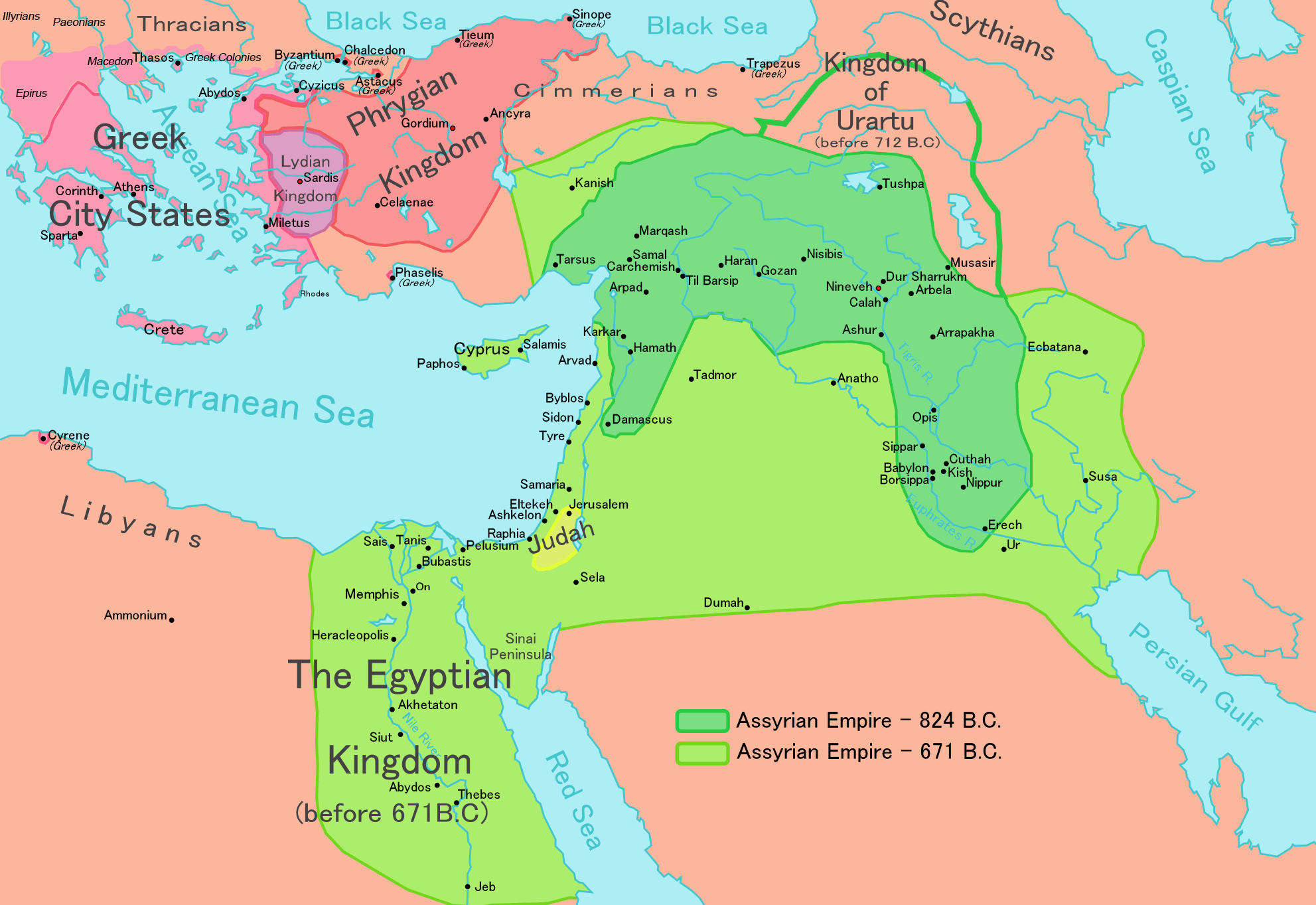
Map of the Neo-Assyrian Empire at their apex in 671 BC

The Neo-Assyrian Empire continued to dominate the Near East during this century, exercising formidable power over neighbors like Babylon and Egypt. In the last two decades of the century, however, the empire began to unravel as numerous enemies made alliances and waged war from all sides. The Assyrians finally left the world stage permanently when their capital Nineveh was destroyed in 612 BC. These events gave rise to the Neo-Babylonian Empire, which would dominate the region for much of the following century.

The Zhou dynasty continues in China and the Late Period begins in Egypt with the Twenty-sixth Dynasty starting with the coronation of Psamtik I.

In Mesoamerica, the Zapotec civilization began to develop in the area later known as the Valley of Oaxaca.

== Events ==
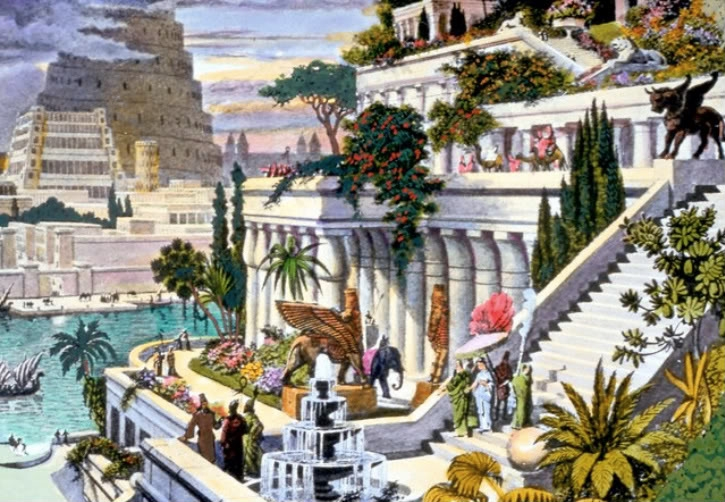
A 16th-century depiction of the Hanging Gardens of Babylon, by Martin Heemskerck, with Tower of Babel in the background.

=== 690s BC ===
- 699 BC: Khallushu succeeds Shuttir-Nakhkhunte as king of the Elamite Empire.
- 697 BC: Death of King Huan of Zhou, king of the Zhou dynasty of China.
- 696 BC: King Zhuang of Zhou becomes king of the Zhou dynasty of China.
- 696 BC: The Cimmerians ravage Phrygia, possible migration of the Armenians.
- 691 BC: King Sennacherib of Assyria defeats king Humban-nimena of Elam in the Battle of Halule.
- 690 BC: Taharqa, a king of the Twenty-fifth Dynasty, ascends the throne of Egypt (approximate date).
- 690s BC: —W'rn Hywt of D'mt in Ethiopia appears in the inscriptional record and mentions the king of Saba', Karib'il Watar.
- c. 690 BC-664 BC—Sphinx of Taharqa, from Temple T, Kawa, Nubia, is made. Twenty-fifth Dynasty of Egypt. It is now kept at The British Museum, London.

=== 680s BC ===
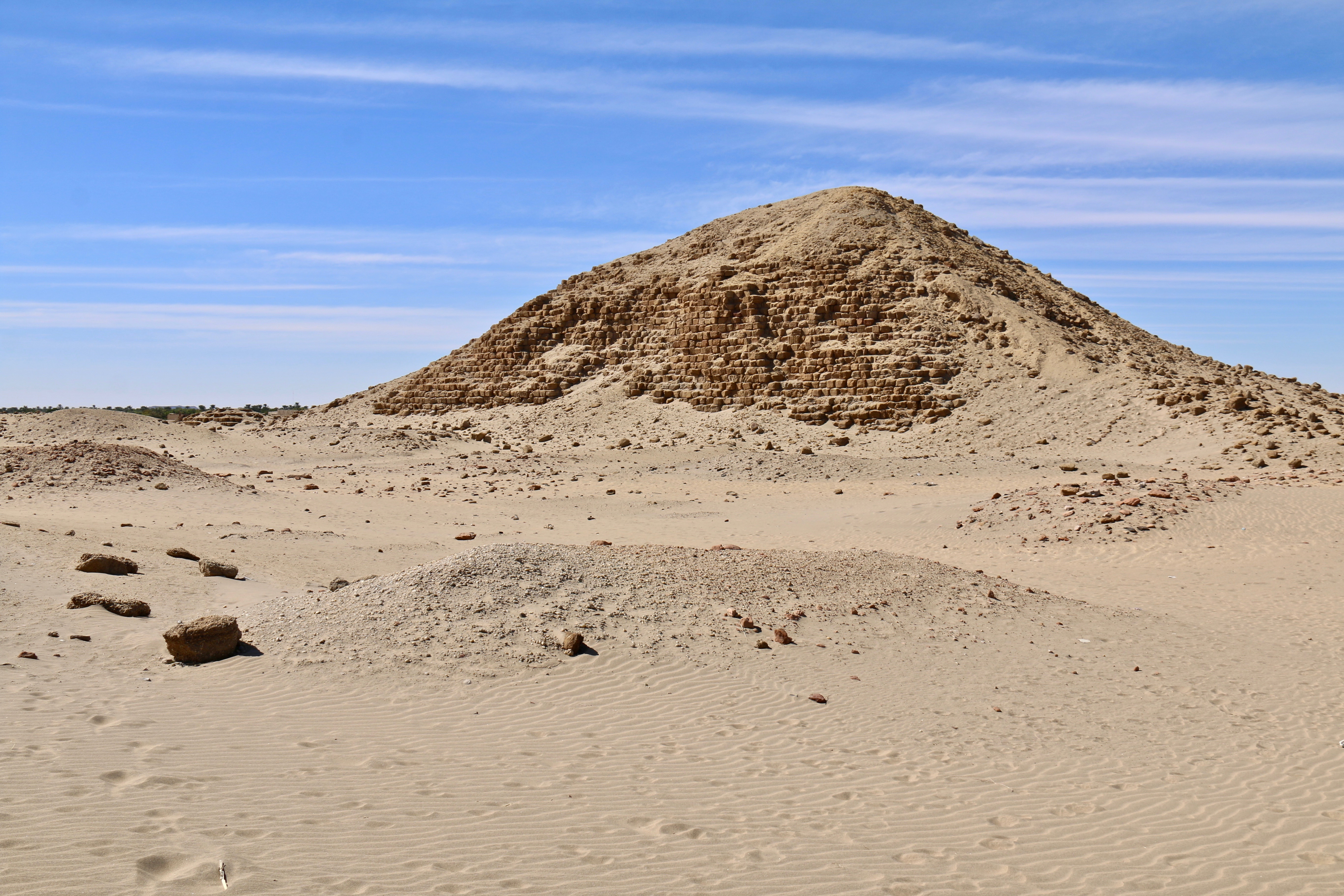
The ruins of the pyramid of Taharqa at Nuri

- 689 BC: King Sennacherib of Assyria sacks Babylon.
- 687 BC: Gyges becomes king of Lydia.
- 687 BC: Hezekiah succeeded by Manasseh as king of Judah.
- 682 BC: Death of King Zhuang of Zhou, king of the Zhou dynasty of China.
- 681 BC: King Xi of Zhou becomes king of the Zhou dynasty of China.
- 681 BC: Esarhaddon succeeds Sennacherib as king of Assyria.

=== 670s BC ===
- 678 BC: Phraortes becomes king of the Medes
- 677 BC: Death of King Xi of Zhou, king of the Zhou dynasty of China.
- 677 BC: Esarhaddon leads the Assyrian army against rebellious Arab tribes and advances as far as the Brook of Egypt.
- 676 BC: King Hui of Zhou becomes king of the Zhou dynasty of China.
- 675 BC: Esarhaddon begins the rebuilding of Babylon.
- 675 BC: Teispes becomes a king of Anshan.
- 674 BC: Esarhaddon puts down a revolt in Ascalon supported by Taharqa, king of Egypt. In response, the Assyrians invade Egypt, but Taharqa can hold the invaders off.
- 673 BC: Tullus Hostilius becomes king of Rome.
- 671 BC: Esarhaddon again invades Egypt, capturing Memphis as well as a number of the royal family.

=== 660s BC ===
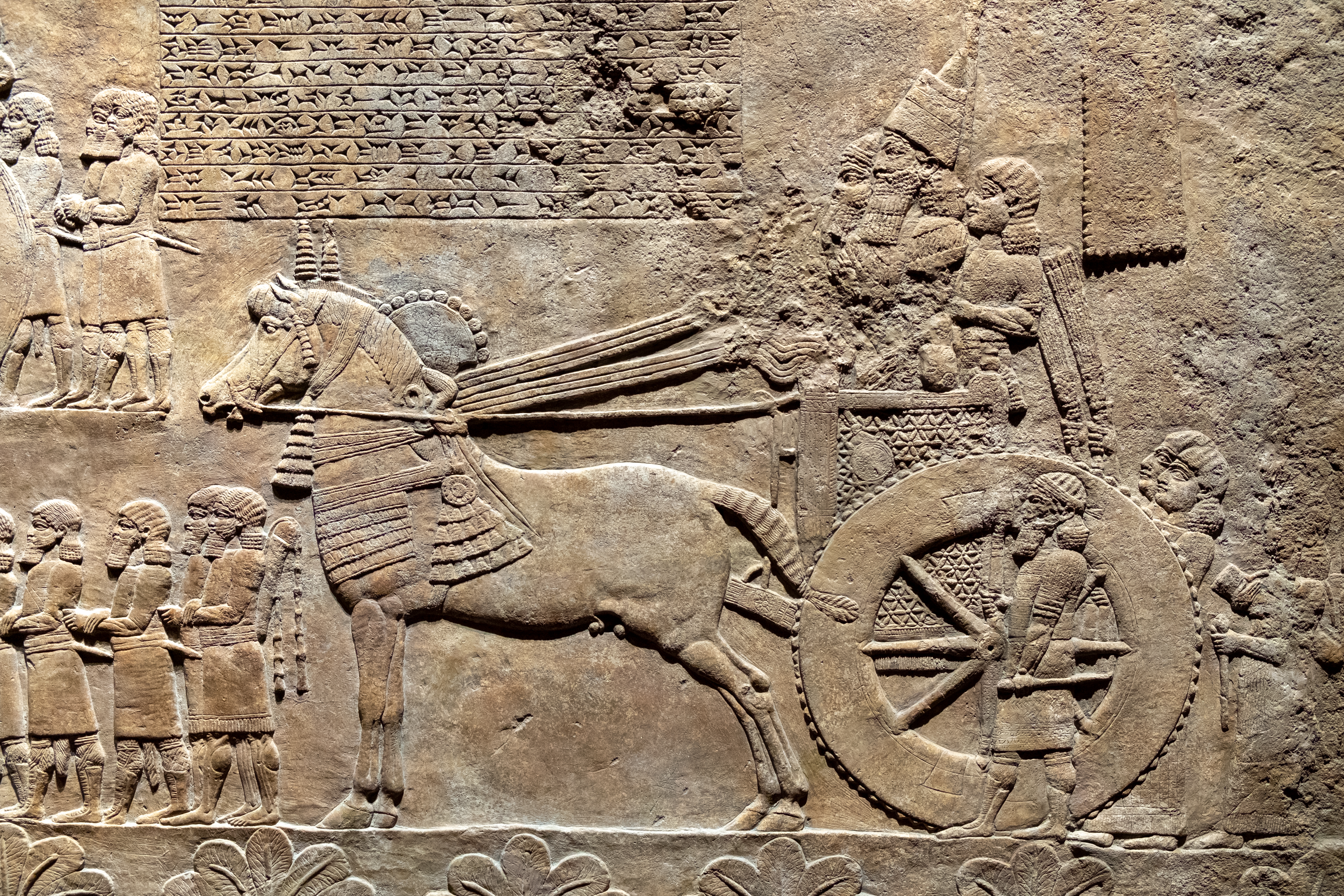
Relief depicting Assurbanipal in a chariot, inspecting booty and prisoners from Babylon.

- 669 BC: Assurbanipal succeeds his father Esarhaddon as king of Assyria.
- 669 BC: Argos defeats Sparta for the last time, this time using a hoplite phalanx, at the battle of Hysiae.
- 668 BC: Shamash-shum-ukin, son of Esarhaddon, becomes King of Babylon.
- 668 BC: Egypt revolts against Assyria.
- 668 BC: Nineveh, capital of Assyria, becomes the largest city of the world, taking the lead from Thebes in Egypt.
- 667 BC: Byzantium founded by Megaran colonists under Byzas. (traditional date)
- 664 BC: First naval battle in Greek recorded history, between Corinth and Corcyra.
- 664 BC: Assurbanipal captures and sacks Thebes, Egypt.
- 664 BC: Psammetichus I succeeds Necho I as king of Lower Egypt.
- 664 BC: Taharqa appoints his nephew Tantamani as his successor of Upper Egypt.
- February 11, 660 BC—Traditional founding date of Japan by Emperor Jimmu.
- 660 BC: First known use of the Demotic script.
- 660 BC: Psammetichus I drives the Assyrians out of Egypt.
- 660 BC: Estimated date of the impact that created the Kaali crater

=== 650s BC ===
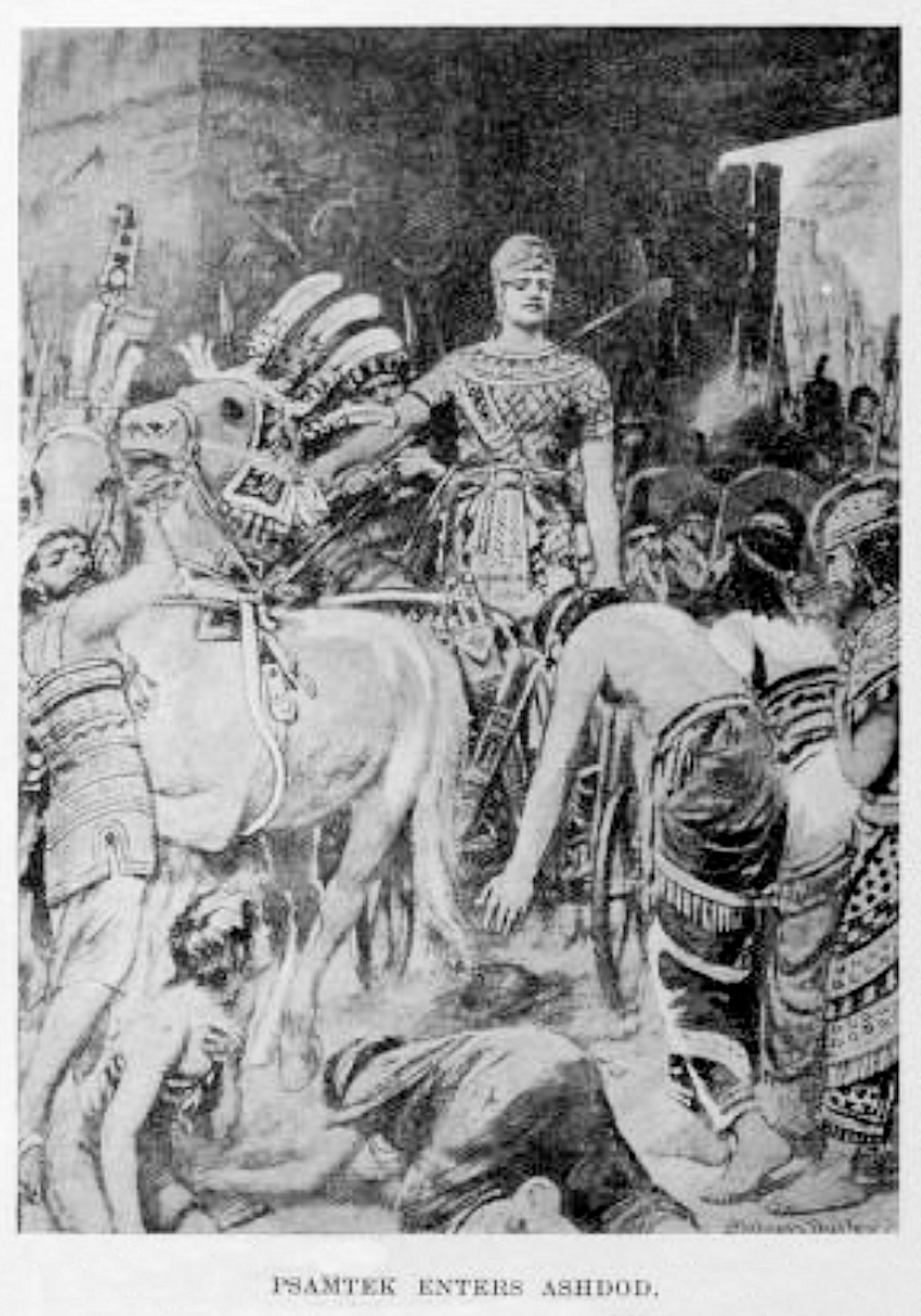
The Fall of Ashdod, Psamtik I enters Ashdod, c. 655 BC

- 650s BC: The Spartan Creed by Ancient Greek poet Tyrtaeus
- 650s BC: Occupation begins at Maya site of Piedras Negras, Guatemala.
- 657 BC: Cypselus becomes the first tyrant of Corinth.
- 656 BC: Psamtik I extends his control over all of Egypt. End of Twenty-fifth Dynasty.
- 653 BC: Atta-Khumma-In-Shushinak and Khumbanigash II succeed Shilhak-In-Shushinak and Tempti-Khumma-In-Shushinak as kings of the Elamite Empire.
- 653 BC: Atlanersa becomes ruler of the Napatan kingdom of Kush after the collapse of the Twenty-fifth Dynasty of Egypt.
- 652 BC: Babylonia rises in revolt under Shamash-shum-ukin against the Assyrians.
- 651 BC: King Xiang of Zhou becomes king of the Zhou dynasty of China.
- 650 BC: The town of Abdera in Thrace is founded by colonists from Clazomenae.
- 650 BC: A climate change affects all the Bronze Age cultures in Europe with colder and wetter climate, and tribes from the Scandinavian Nordic Bronze Age cultures are pushed downwards into the European continent.

=== 640s BC ===
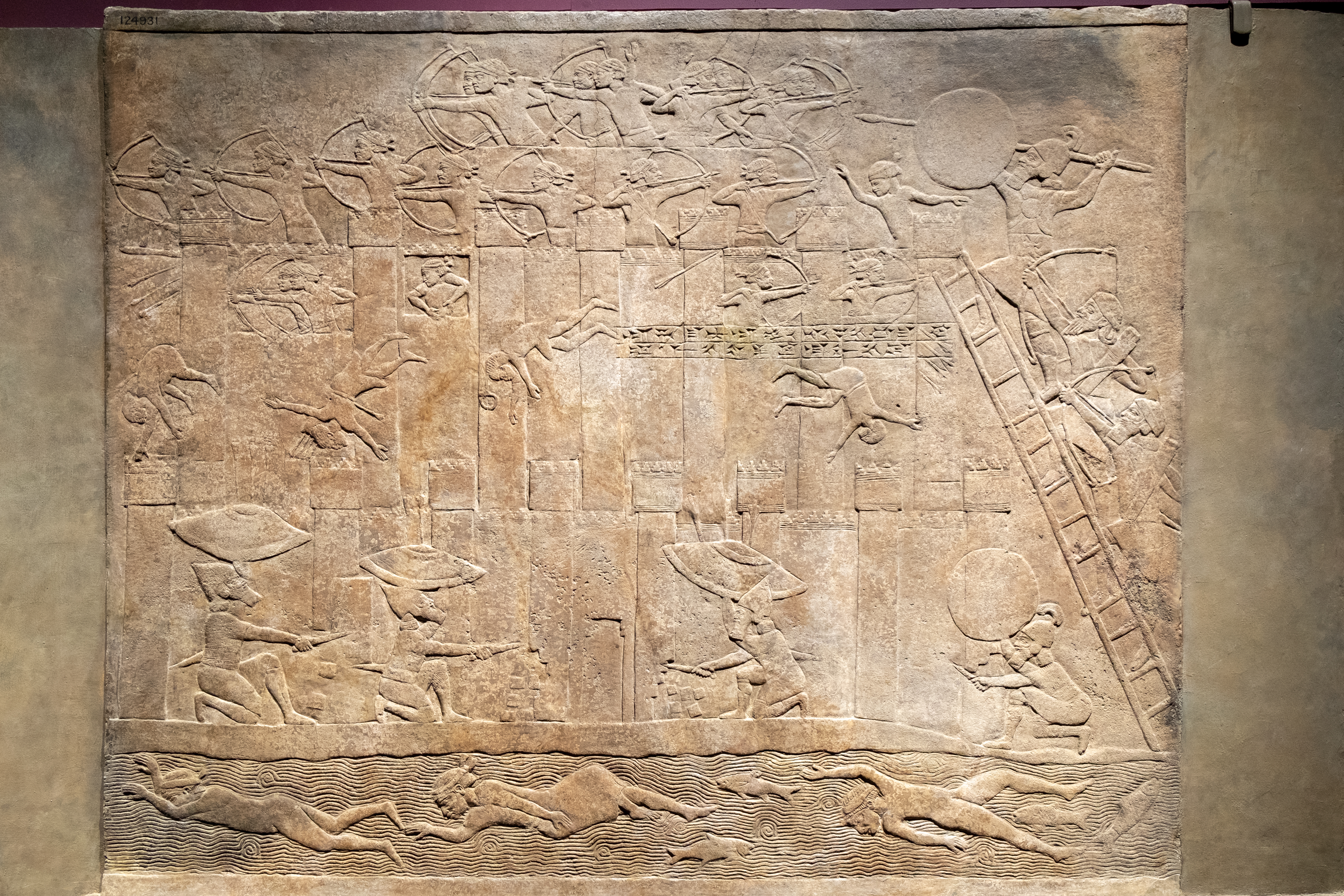
Relief depicting the Assyrians besieging the Elamite city of Hamanu in 646 BC

- 640s BC: Assyrian king Ashurbanipal founds library, which included our earliest complete copy of the Epic of Gilgamesh.
- 649 BC: Indabigash succeeds Tammaritu as a king of the Elamite Empire.
- 649 BC: Babylonian revolt under Shamash-shum-ukin is crushed by the Assyrians.
- 648 BC: Pankration becomes an event at the Ancient Olympic Games.
- April 6, 648 BC: Earliest Greek-chronicled solar eclipse.
- 647 BC: King Assurbanipal of Assyria sacks Susa.
- 642 BC: Ancus Marcius becomes king of Rome (traditional date).
- c.641 BC: Josiah becomes king of Judah.
- 640 BC: Decisive victory of Assyria over Elamite Empire; Assurbanipal captures its last king Khumma-Khaldash III, annexes Elam, and lays waste the country.

=== 630s BC ===
- 632 BC: Cylon, Athenian noble, seizes the Acropolis in a failed attempt to become king.
- 632 BC: In the Battle of Chengpu, the Chinese kingdom of Jin and her allies defeat the kingdom of Chu and her allies.
- 631 BC: Founding of Cyrene, a Greek colony in Libya (North Africa) (approximate date).
- 631 BC: Sadyates becomes king of Lydia.

=== 620s BC ===
- 627 BC: Death of Assurbanipal, king of Assyria; he is succeeded by Assur-etel-ilani (approximate date).
- 626 BC: Nabopolassar revolts against Assyria, founds the Neo-Babylonian Empire.
- 625 BC: Cyaxares becomes king of the Median Empire.
- 625 BC: Medes and Babylonians assert their independence from Assyria and attack Nineveh (approximate date).
- 623 BC: Sin-shar-ishkun succeeds his brother Assur-etel-ilani as king of Assyria (approximate date).
- 622 BC: Text of Deuteronomy found in the Temple in Jerusalem. The Hebrew prophet Ezekiel said to be born this year.

=== 610s BC ===
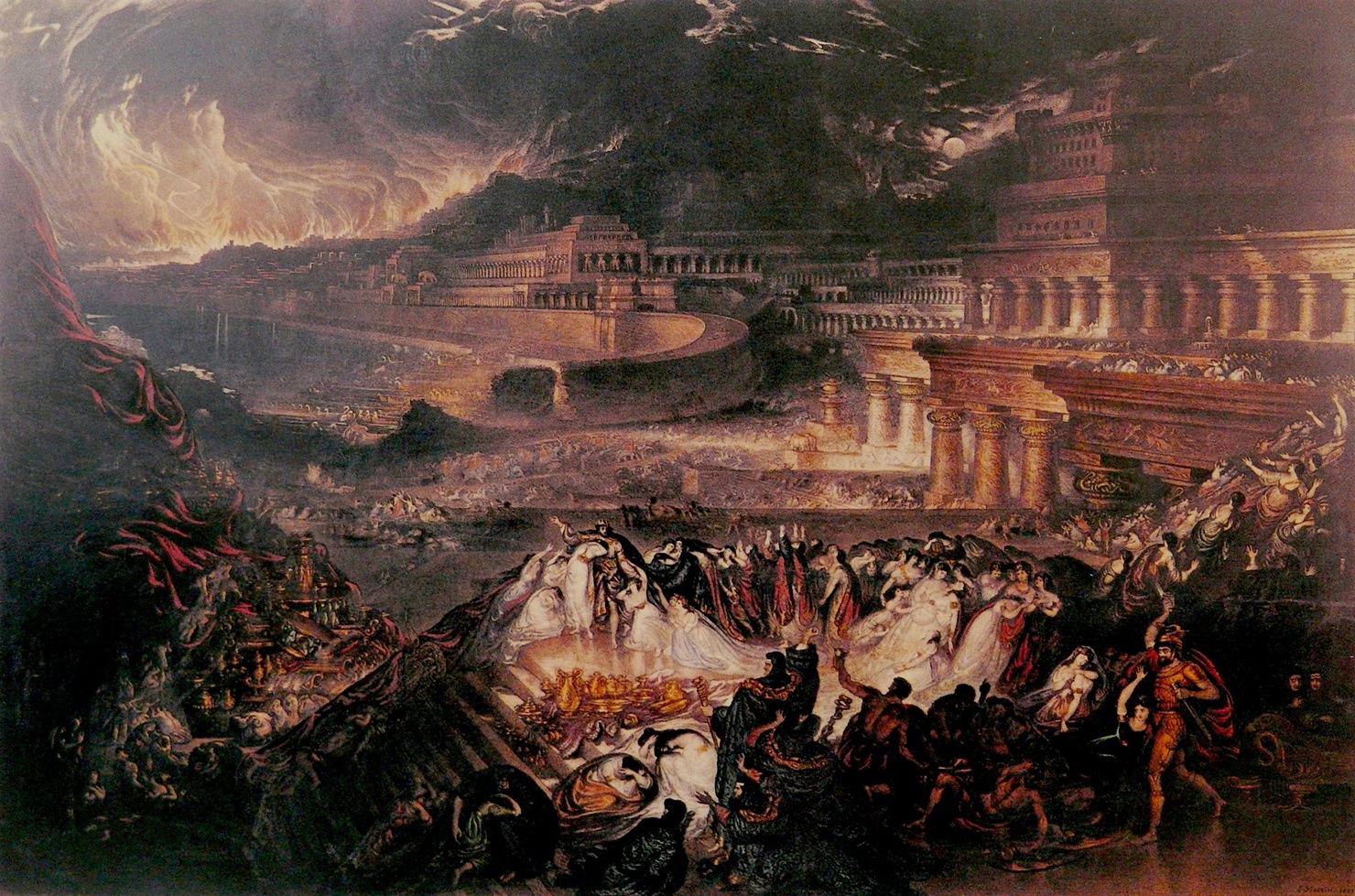
The Fall of Nineveh, by John Martin

- 619 BC: Alyattes becomes king of Lydia.
- 619 BC: Death of King Xiang of Zhou, king of the Zhou dynasty of China.
- 618 BC: King Qing of Zhou becomes king of the Zhou dynasty of China.
- 616 BC: Lucius Tarquinius Priscus becomes king of Rome.
- 614 BC: Sack of Ashur by the Medes and Babylonians.
- 613 BC: Death of King Qing of Zhou, king of the Zhou dynasty of China.
- 612 BC: King Kuang of Zhou becomes king of the Zhou dynasty of China.
- 612 BC: An alliance of Medes, Babylonians and Susianians besiege and conquer Nineveh. King Sin-shar-ishkun of Assyria is killed in the sack.
- 612 BC: Ashur-uballit II attempts to keep the Assyrian empire alive by establishing himself as king at Harran.
- 612 BC: Babylon, capital of Babylonia becomes the largest city of the world, taking the lead from Nineveh, capital of Assyria.
- 610 BC: Necho II succeeds Psammetichus I as king of Egypt.

=== 600s BC ===
Political maps of the Ancient Near East in 700 BC (top) and 600 BC (bottom)
- 609 BC: King Josiah of Judah dies in the Battle of Megiddo against Pharaoh Necho II of Egypt, who is on his way north to aid the rump Assyrian state of Ashur-uballit II.
- 609 BC: The Babylonians defeat the Assyrian army of Ashur-uballit II and capture Harran. Ashur-uballit, the last Assyrian king, disappears from history.
- 609 BC: Jehoahaz succeeds his father Josiah as King of Judah, but is quickly deposed by Necho, who installs Jehoahaz's brother Jehoiakim in his place.
- 607 BC: Death of King Kuang of Zhou, king of the Zhou dynasty of China.
- 606 BC: King Ding of Zhou becomes king of the Zhou dynasty of China.
- 605 BC: Battle of Carchemish: Crown Prince Nebuchadnezzar of Babylon defeats the army of Necho II of Egypt, securing the Babylonian conquest of Assyria. The Babylonians pursue the Egyptians through Syria and Palestine.
- 605 BC: Nebuchadnezzar II succeeds his father Nabopolassar as King of Babylon.
- 601 BC: An alliance of Medes (from western Iran) and Scythians (who originated from the Eurasian Steppe) invade the northern and eastern parts of Assyria.
- 600 BC: Foundation of Capua.
- 600 BC: India—Age of the Mahajanapadas—16 polities rule India—Kasi, Kosala, Anga, Magadha, Vajji (or Vṛji), Malla, Chedi, Vatsa (or Vamsa), Kuru, Panchala, Matsya (or Maccha), Surasena, Assaka, Avanti, Gandhara, Kamboja
- 600 BC: Foundation of Milan by Celts (approximate date).
- 600 BC: Foundation of Marseille by Phoceans (traditional date).
- 600 BC: Smyrna sacked and destroyed.
- 600 BC: Nebuchadnezzar builds the Hanging Gardens of Babylon.

== Inventions, discoveries, introductions ==
- First metal coins used by the Lydians of western Anatolia. Until c. 525 BC, coins bore an image on one side only.
- Greeks adopt coins from Asia Minor.
- Iron allegedly discovered in China.
- 7th century BC – 4th century BC – Etruscan cemetery of La Banditaccia, Cerveteri is made.

== Sovereign states ==
See: List of sovereign states in the 7th century BC.
