= 670s BC =

679 BC in various calendars
- Gregorian calendar: 679 BC; DCLXXIX BC
- Ab urbe condita: 75
- Ancient Egypt era: XXV dynasty, 74
- Pharaoh: Taharqa, 12
- Ancient Greek Olympiad (summer): 25th Olympiad, year 2
- Assyrian calendar: 4072
- Balinese saka calendar: N/A
- Bengali calendar: −1272 – −1271
- Berber calendar: 272
- Buddhist calendar: −134
- Burmese calendar: −1316
- Byzantine calendar: 4830–4831
- Chinese calendar: 辛丑年 (Metal Ox); 2019 or 1812 — to — 壬寅年 (Water Tiger); 2020 or 1813
- Coptic calendar: −962 – −961
- Discordian calendar: 488
- Ethiopian calendar: −686 – −685
- Hebrew calendar: 3082–3083
- Hindu calendars
- Vikram Samvat: −622 – −621
- Shaka Samvat: N/A
- Kali Yuga: 2422–2423
- Holocene calendar: 9322
- Iranian calendar: 1300 BP – 1299 BP
- Islamic calendar: 1340 BH – 1339 BH
- Javanese calendar: N/A
- Julian calendar: N/A
- Korean calendar: 1655
- Minguo calendar: 2590 before ROC 民前2590年
- Nanakshahi calendar: −2146
- Thai solar calendar: −136 – −135
- Tibetan calendar: ལྕགས་མོ་གླང་ལོ་ (female Iron-Ox) −552 or −933 or −1705 — to — ཆུ་ཕོ་སྟག་ལོ་ (male Water-Tiger) −551 or −932 or −1704

The 670s BC, or 670s BCE are the decade that runs from 679 BC to 670 BC. At the time it was known as 75-84 Ab urbe condita in Rome. The denomination 670s BC for this decade has been used since the early medieval period, when the Anno Domini calendar era became the prevalent method in Europe for naming decades.

== Events and trends ==
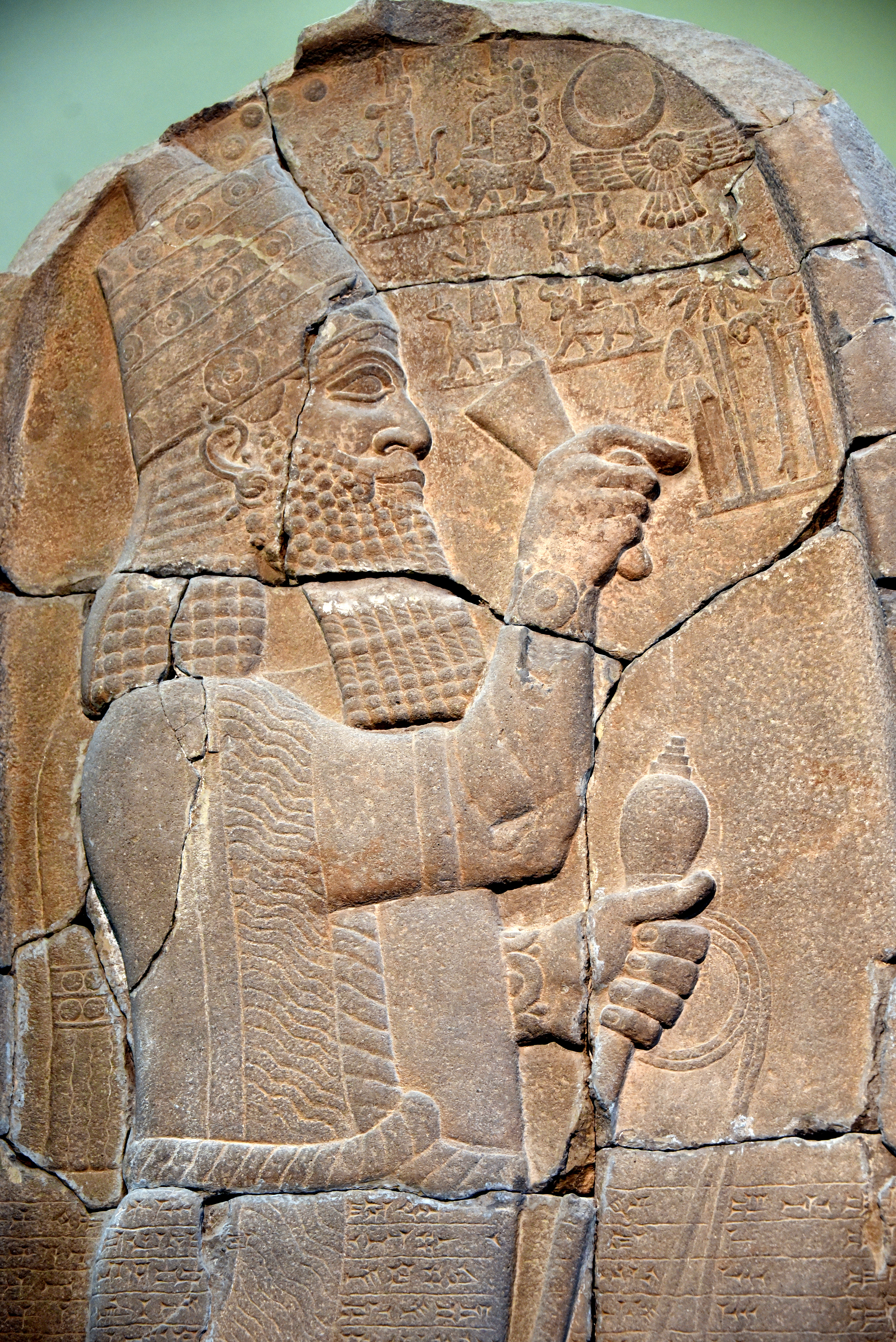
Esarhaddon

=== 679 BC ===
- Siomón Brecc's reign ends and is succeeded by Dui Finn, according to the chronology of Geoffrey Keating's Foras Feasa ar Éirinn.
- The Assyrian king Esarhaddon (r. 681 – 669 BCE), the son of Sennacherib, defeated the Cimmerians and killed their king Teušpa at Ḫubišna. Esarhaddon appears to have reached Ḫubišna by passing through the Göksu River valley and bypassing the Anti-Taurus Mountains and Tabal proper.
- Duke Huan of Qi was officially rewarded hegemony by the Zhou king Xi in 679 BCE.
- Esarhaddon, is mentioned in some texts as having taken a city called Arsa near the River of Egypt, and its king Asuhili was taken back to the Assyrian capital Ninveh.
- A large structure with a mudbrick self-supporting arch roof was discovered and dated to between this year and 630 BCE in Tell Jemmeh.
- Bartatua succeeds Išpakaia as king of Iškuza.
- Esarhaddon campaigned in the Tabalian region against the Cimmerians from his base in Que and Ḫilakku, resulting in the defeat and killing of the Cimmerian king Teušpâ in Ḫubišna, who was succeeded by Dugdammî, and the annexation of a part of the territory of Ḫilakku and of the sub-kingdom of Kundu and Sissu in Que, whose king Sanduarri fled into the mountains, and of a part of the territory of Ḫilakku.
- Esarhaddon campaigned in Khor, destroyed Sidon, and forced Tyre into tribute from 677 to 676 BC.
- The Cimmerians attacked Lydia for the third time, led by their king Lygdamis. The Lydians were defeated, Sardis was sacked, and Gyges was killed, following which he was succeeded by his son, Ardys, who was the father of Sadyattes.
- The Cimmerians migrate to the east and west of Mannaea.
- The Assyrians used Cimmerians in their army as mercenaries; a legal document of 679 B.C. refers to an Assyrian ‘commander of the Cimmerian regiment’; but in other Assyrian documents they are called ‘the seed of runaways who know neither vows to the gods nor oaths’
- The Cimmerians invade the westernmost provinces of the Assyrian Empire.
- Palaka of the Pradyota dynasty begins and ends reign according to Aryabhata.

=== 678 BC ===
- Phraortes becomes king of the Medes (according to the chronology proposed by Igor Diakonoff)
- Chu soldiers invade Zheng (according to the Zuo Zhuan)
- King Wen of Chu conquers the state of Deng.
- King Xi of Zhou used his royal clout to give legitimacy to Wu of Quwo as the rightful duke of Jin
- The state of Jin became the first to maintain a standing army
- Jin–Quwo wars end (739–678 BCE), dynastic struggles between two branches of Jin's ruling house
- Kaštaritu is mentioned as "King of the Medes" in an inscription
- According to Herodotus, Ecbatana was chosen as the Medes' capital by Deioces, the first ruler of the Medes.
- Deioces united the Median tribes of Media and made the first Iranian Empire.
- Chu had conquered most of the Nanyang Basin
- Nekauba becomes pharaoh of the twenty-sixth dynasty of Egypt

==== November ====
- Two solar eclipses occur on the 1st and the 30th over the Penzhina Bay and the South Pacific Ocean respectively.

=== 677 BC ===
- Esarhaddon leads the Assyrian army against rebellious Arab tribes and advances as far as the Brook of Egypt.
- From this year to 676 BC, Esarhaddon, forced Tyre into tribute after campaigning in Khor and destroying Sidon in 679 BC.
- Esarhaddon recaptures the rebellious city of Sidon in Syria. The king of Sidon, Abdi-Milkutti, escapes by boat but is captured and executed a year later.
- Manasseh of Judah was taken into temporary captivity by the soldiers of Esarhaddon and taken to Babylon.

=== 676 BC ===
- Callisthenes of Laconia wins the stadion race at the 26th Olympic Games.
- Zhou Hui Wang becomes King of the Zhou Dynasty of China.
- The Cimmerians penetrate deep into Assyrian territory but are defeated by Esarhaddon and his army.

=== 675 BC ===
- The Elamite king Urtaku comes to power; during his reign, relations between Elam and Babylonia worsen.
- King Deioces dies after a 53-year reign that has established the kingdom of the Medes and its capital at Ecbatana (later Hamedan) in what will be northwest Persia. He is succeeded by his son Phraortes, who forms an anti-Assyrian alliance with the Cimmerians to subjugate the Persians and other Asian peoples.
- King Esarhaddon begins to rebuild Babylon (approximate date).
- Teispes becomes a king of Anshan.
- The Elamites invade Babylonia and capture Sippar. The conflict is resolved peacefully after the death of the Elamite king Khumban-khaltash II and Sippar is returned.
- Esarhaddon's Treaty with Ba'al of Tyre

=== 674 BC ===
- Esarhaddon puts down a revolt in Ascalon supported by Taharqa, king of Kush and Egypt. In response, the Assyrians invade Egypt, but Taharqa is able to hold them off.
- Esarhaddon names his eldest son Sin-nadin-apli crown prince.

=== 673 BC ===
- Tullus Hostilius becomes the third king of Rome.
- Esarhaddon unsuccessfully invades Egypt, one of the worst defeats of the Assyrian Empire.

=== 672 BC ===
- Sin-nadin-apli dies; Esarhaddon replaces him as heir with the younger son Ashurbanipal and designates his eldest son Shamash-shum-ukin as the heir to Babylon.

=== 671 BC ===
- Esarhaddon again invades Egypt, this time successfully, capturing Memphis as well as a number of the royal family. He sets up a new Assyrian administration in Lower Egypt and withdraws.
- Esarhaddon invades and conquers Egypt, bringing the Assyrian Empire to its greatest extent.
- The usurper Sasî unsuccessfully attempts to wrestle the throne from Esarhaddon.

=== 670 BC ===
- King Gyges of Lydia's name is written on the first Greek coins.
- Miletus begins establishing colonies in the Black Sea and Mediterranean Sea.
  Map of the Black Sea, featuring the chronological phasing of major Milesian colonial foundations

=== Year unknown ===
- The Cimmerian invasion of Phrygia probably happened in 679 or 676 BC, though some sources place it in the 690s BC.

== Significant people ==
- Esarhaddon, King of Assyria and conqueror of Egypt (reigned 681–669 BC)
- Argaeus I, who acceded to the kingship of Macedon with his father's death; he reigned from c. 623 BC to c. 640 BC
- Zhou Hui Wang, ruler of China during the Zhou dynasty

== Births ==
=== 675 BC ===
- Ancus Marcius, 4th king of Rome

== Deaths ==
=== 679 BC ===
- Siomón Brecc, according to the chronology of Geoffrey Keating's Foras Feasa ar Éirinn.
- Teušpâ, king of the Cimmerians
- Išpakaia, king of Iškuza.
- Gyges of Lydia

=== 678 BC ===
- approximate date of death of Perdiccas I, king of Macedon
- Min, Marquis of Jin
- Duke Wu of Qin, ruler of the state of Qin, had 66 people sacrificed and buried with him

=== 677 BC ===
- King Xi of Zhou, king of the Zhou Dynasty of China.
- Abdi-Milkutti, king of Sidon.
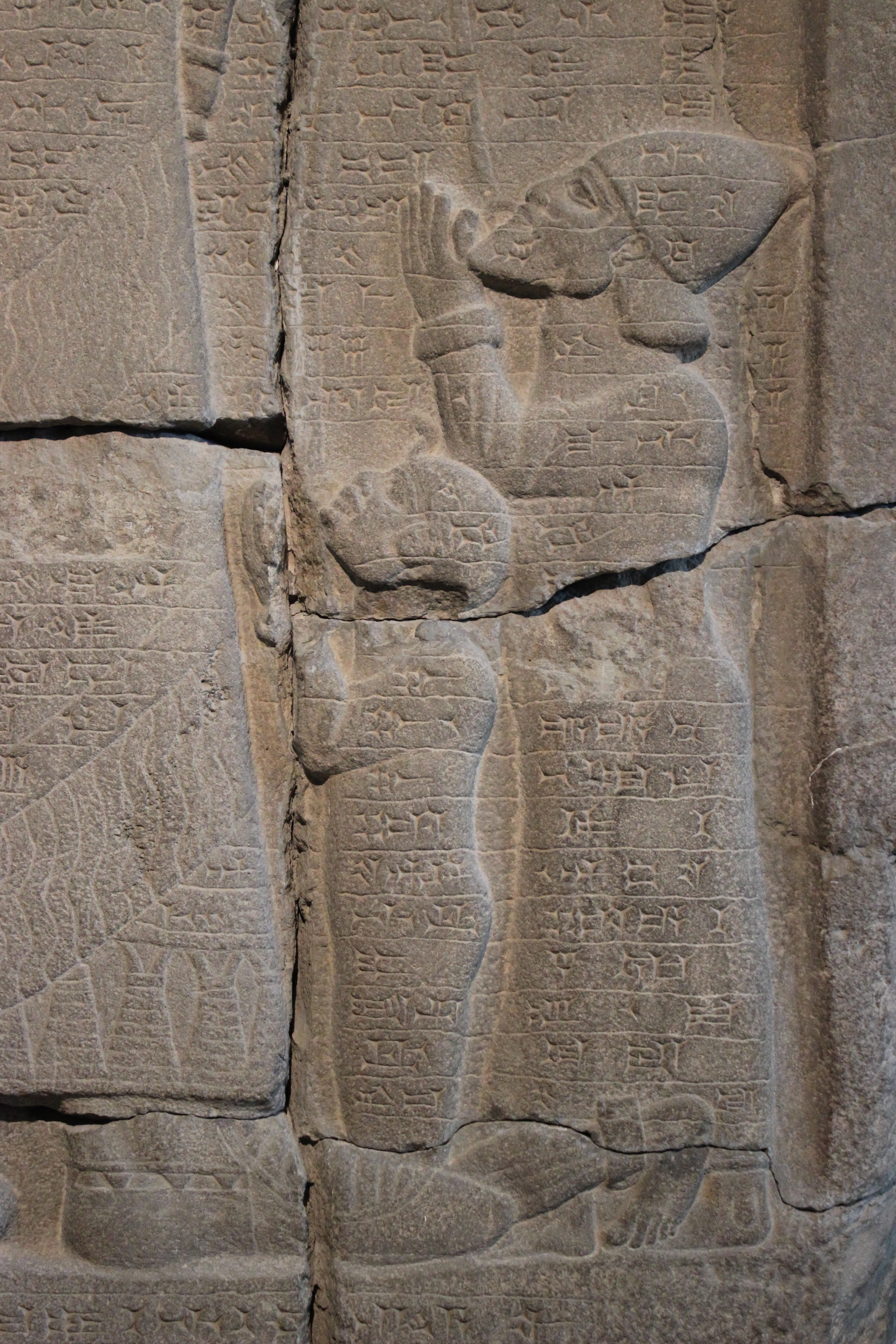
  Abdi-Milkutti
- King Wen of Chu
- Duke Wu of Jin

=== 676 BC ===
- Duke De of Qin

=== 675 BC ===
- Deioces
- Marquis Ai of Cai

=== 673 BC ===
- Numa Pompilius, second of the Kings of Rome, successor to Romulus
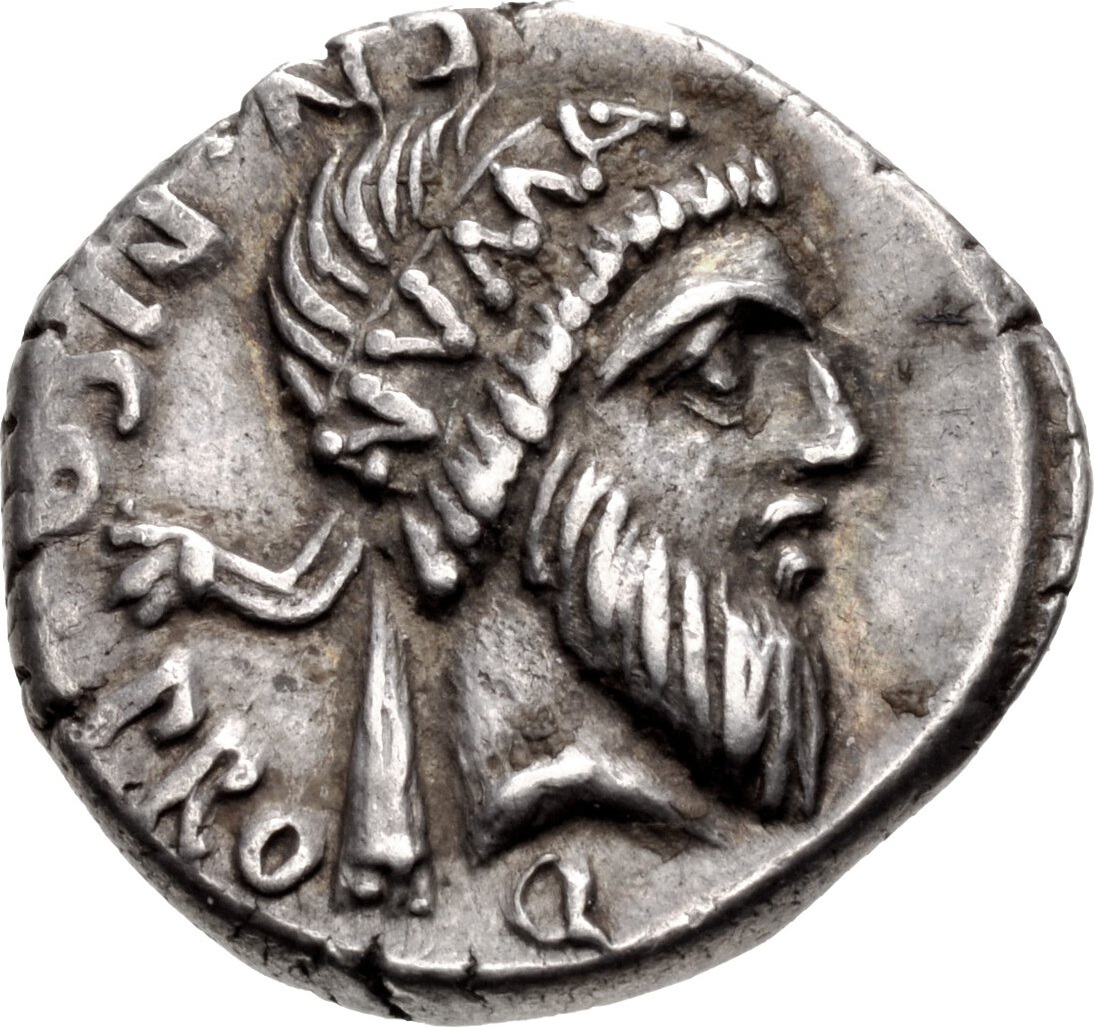
  Numa Pompilius
- Wen Jiang, princess of the State of Qi and duchess of the State of Lu

=== 672 BC ===
- Du'ao, king of the Chinese state of Chu.
- Yukou

==== February ====
- Ešarra-ḫammat, Queen of the Neo-Assyrian Empire

=== 670 BC ===
- Mettius Fufetius, Latin king of Alba Longa
- Oracle of Nusku
