= Battle of Ashdod =

The Battle of Ashdod may refer to one of the following battles:

- Fall of Ashdod in circa 635 BC
- Operation Pleshet in the 1948 Arab–Israeli War
- Capture of Ashdod during Operation Yoav in the 1948 Arab–Israeli War
