= 640s BC =

Decade

This article concerns the period 649 BC – 640 BC.

== Events and trends ==
- Assyrian king Ashurbanipal founds a library, which includes the earliest complete copy of the Epic of Gilgamesh.
- 649 BC — Indabigash succeeds Tammaritu as a king of the Elamite Empire.
- 649 BC — A Babylonian revolt under Shamash-shum-ukin is crushed by the Assyrians.
- 649 BC — Traditional date of the foundation of Himera by Zancle.
- 648 BC — Babylon falls to Assyrian forces after a 3-year siege (see 651 BC); starved out by his half brother Ashurbanipal, king Shamash-shum-ukin commits suicide in his burning palace, as the Assyrians slaughter his city's garrison and much of its population.
- 648 BC — Messenians in the Peloponnese revolt against Sparta under the leadership of king Aristomenes, beginning a struggle that will continue until 631 BC.
- 648 BC — Pankration becomes an event at the Ancient Olympic Games.
- April 6, 648 BC—Earliest Greek-chronicled solar eclipse.
- 647 BC — King Assurbanipal of Assyria sacks Susa.
- c. 647 BC — The wall panel Assurbanipal and his Queen in the garden, from the palace at Nineveh (modern Kuyunjik, Iraq) is completed. It is now in The British Museum, London.
- 645 BC — In the Chinese book of the Spring and Autumn Annals, it was recorded that on December 24 of this year there were five meteors seen in the sky over what is now northern Shanqiu County, Henan Province. It was the first Chinese recording of meteors.
- 644 BC — Cimmerian forces from Anatolia conquer Sardis and reach the peak of their power. King Gyges of Lydia has spent most of his 28-year reign fighting his southern and western neighbors in an effort to gain suzerainty over all of Western Asia Minor. He has helped the rebellion of Psamtik I, but he receives no support from his erstwhile Assyrian ally Ashurbanipal. Gyges falls in a battle against the Cimmerians under king Tugdamme.
- 644 BC — Ardys succeeds his father Gyges as the second Mermnad king of Lydia. During his reign he finds payment of tribute to Assyria preferable to rule by the Cimmerians, who will be routed a few decades later.
- c. 641 BC — Josiah becomes king of Judah.
- 641 BC — Tullus Hostilius dies and interregnum starts (traditional date).
- 640 BC — Decisive victory of Assyria over Elamite Empire; Ashurbanipal captures its last king Khumma-Khaldash III, annexes Elam, and lays waste to the country.
- 640 BC — Theagenes becomes tyrant at Megara.
- 640 BC — Kolaios of Samos reaches the Strait of Gibraltar.
- 640 BC — The interregnum in Rome ends. Ancus Marcius becomes the fourth king of Rome

== Significant people ==
- c. 648 BC — Birth of Josiah, king of Judah (d. 609 BC)
- 648 BC — Death of Shamash-shum-ukin, Assyrian king of Babylonia.
- 645 BC — Death of Guan Zhong, Prime Minister of the Chinese state of Qi
- c. 645 BC — Death of Archilochos, Greek poet
- 644 BC — Death of Gyges, king of Lydia
- 644 BC — Death of Bao Shuya, prominent official under Duke Huan of Qi
- c. 643 BC — Death of Manasseh of Judah
- 643 BC — Birth of Ezekiel, prophet
- 643 BC — Death of Duke Huan of Qi in China
- 642 BC — Death of Wukui, ruler of the state of Qi
- 641 BC — Death of Tullus Hostilius, third king of Rome
- 641 BC — Death of Amon, king of Judah
- c. 640 BC — Birth of Stesichorus, Greek poet
- 640 BC — Death of Teispes, son of Achaemenes and ancestor of Cyrus the Great
