= 627 (disambiguation) =

627 may refer to:

- the year 627, AD
- the year 620s BC
- the number 627 (number)
- Prisoner 627, identification number for Captain John Price, a fictional character in the video game Call of Duty: Modern Warfare 2.
- Experiment 627, a fictional character from the Lilo & Stitch franchise
- Disodium guanylate E627 food additive
