= Tammaritu II =

Ruler of Elam from 652 to 650/649 BC

Tammaritu II was the ruler of Elam from 652 until 650 or 649 BC. After the brief reigns of Indabibi and Humban-haltash III, Tammaritu II was briefly restored to power in 648. Tammaritu II was the son of Tammaritu I and the successor of Ummanigash, his uncle.

After a failed attack in 652 BC by then Elamite king Ummanigash against the Assyrian Empire, Tammaritu II rose to power in a coup. Tammaritu continued Ummanigash's policy of supporting the Babylonian ruler Shamash-shum-ukin against the Assyrian king Ashurbanipal. During the fighting, one of his generals, Indabibi, switched sides, and Tammaritu escaped to Nineveh in either 650 or 649 BC. Thus began the brief rule of Indabibi over Elam.

In 648 BC, Indabibi was killed and replaced by Humban-haltash III. The Assyrians then invaded Elam again, and installed Tammaritu once more as king of Elam. Tammaritu was then deposed and exiled by Assyria after complaining about the Assyrian plundering of Elam. Humban-haltash III then ruled again over Elam.

== See also ==
- List of rulers of Elam
