= Battle of Susa =

647 BCE military engagement between Assyria and Elam

Coordinates: 32.18922°N 48.25778°E

- Part of the Assyrian conquest of Elam
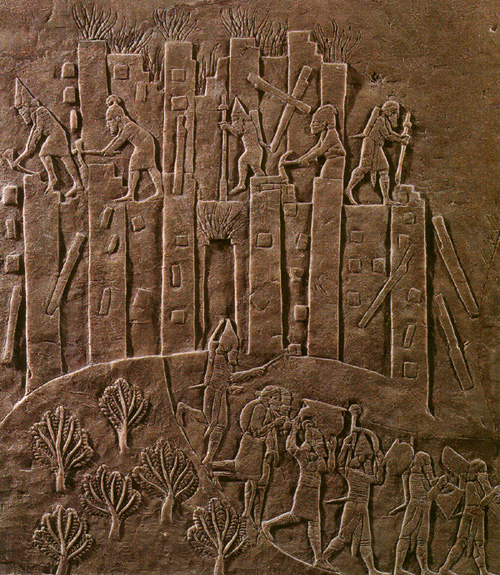
- City of Hamanu in Elam, sacked by the Assyrians. Ashurbanipal's brutal campaign against Susa in 647 BC is triumphantly recorded in this relief. Here, flames rise from the city as Assyrian soldiers topple it with pickaxes and crowbars and carry off the spoils.
Date	647 BC
Location	Mesopotamia, Elam
Result	Assyrian victory; Looting and total destruction of Susa

Belligerents
Assyria	Elam

Commanders and leaders
King Assurbanipal	King Humban-haltash III

Strength
Unknown	Unknown

Casualties and losses
Unknown	Unknown

The Battle of Susa was a battle involving Assyrians and Elamites. The Assyrian king Ashurbanipal, had grown tired of the Elamites' attacks on the Mesopotamians, and he decided to destroy Susa as punishment.

In 647 BC, the Assyrian king Ashurbanipal leveled the city during a war in which the people of Susa apparently participated on the other side. A tablet unearthed in 1854 by Austen Henry Layard in Nineveh reveals Ashurbanipal as an "avenger", seeking retribution for the humiliations the Elamites had inflicted on the Mesopotamians over the centuries. Ashurbanipal dictates Assyrian retribution after his successful siege of Susa:

Susa, the great holy city, abode of their gods, seat of their mysteries, I conquered. I entered its palaces, I opened their treasuries where silver and gold, goods and wealth were amassed... I destroyed the ziggurat of Susa. I smashed its shining copper horns. I reduced the temples of Elam to naught; their gods and goddesses I scattered to the winds. The tombs of their ancient and recent kings I devastated, I exposed to the sun, and I carried away their bones toward the land of Ashur. I devastated the provinces of Elam and on their lands I sowed salt.

— Ashurbanipal
