= 590s BC =

Decade

This article concerns the period 599 BC – 590 BC.

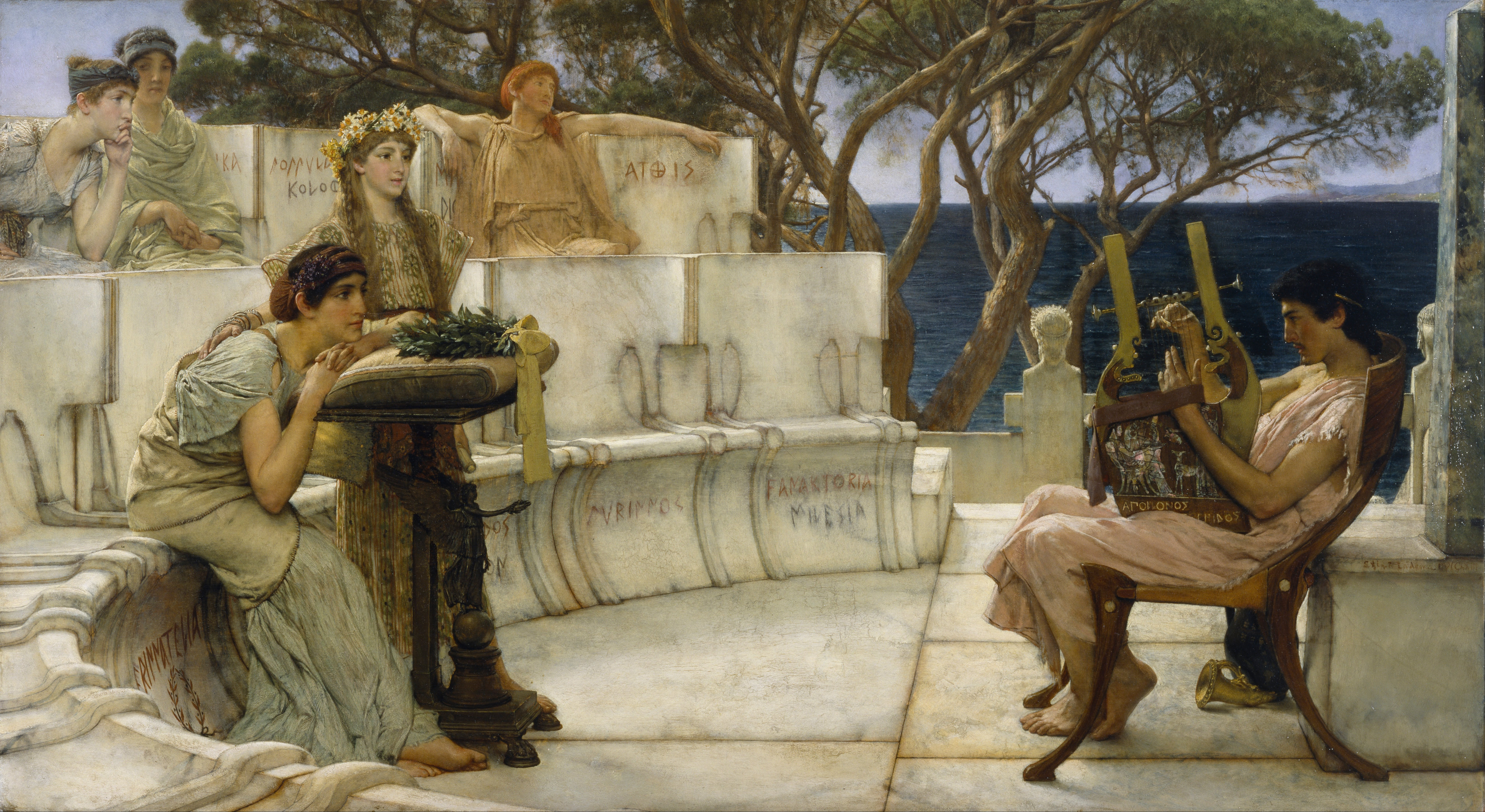
Sappho and Alcaeus by Lawrence Alma-Tadema (1881).

== Events and trends ==
- 598 BC—Jeconiah succeeds Jehoiakim as King of Judah.
- 598 BC—Kamarina is founded in Sicily (traditional date).
- March 16, 597 BC—Babylonians capture Jerusalem following a siege, replace Jeconiah with Zedekiah as king, and send many Jews (including Ezekiel) into Babylonian captivity.
- 597 BC—Jin and Chu fought in the Battle of Bi. Viscount Huan of Zhongxing led the Jin army and was defeated by King Zhuang of Chu.
- 595 BC—Psamtik II succeeds Necho II as king of Egypt.
- 595 BC—Beginning of the First Sacred War in ancient Greece.
- 594 BC—The leaders of Athens, facing an economic crisis and popular discontent, appoint the poet–statesman Solon (eponymous archon) to institute democratic reforms and revive the city's constitution, extending citizenship to males of many classes and establishing the Ecclesia.
- 593 BC—Napata is sacked by the Egyptians and the Kushite capital relocates to Meroë.
- 593 BC—Exile of Sappho and Alcaeus (Alkaios) of Mytilene in Sicily.
- 592 BC—Early history of Sudan: An Egyptian army sacks Napata, compelling the Cushite court to move to a more secure location at Meroë near the sixth cataract of the Nile.
- 590 BC—The Medians invade the Kingdom of Urartu, causing its fall.

== Births ==
- 599 BC—Birth of Mahavira, the 24th Tirthankara of Jainism (died 527 BC)
- 598 BC—Ma'add ibn Adnan, ancestor of several Arab tribes

== Deaths ==
- 599 BC—Duke Hui of Qi, ruler of the Chinese state of Qi
- 598 BC—Jehoiakim, king of Judah
- 595 BC—Necho II, ruler of Egypt
- 591 BC—King Zhuang of Chu, king of Chu
- 590 BC—Eurycratides, Agiad king of Sparta
- 590 or 615 BC—Rusa III, king of Urartu
