= Fall of Ashdod =

Ancient battle

- Part of the Wars of Neo-Assyria
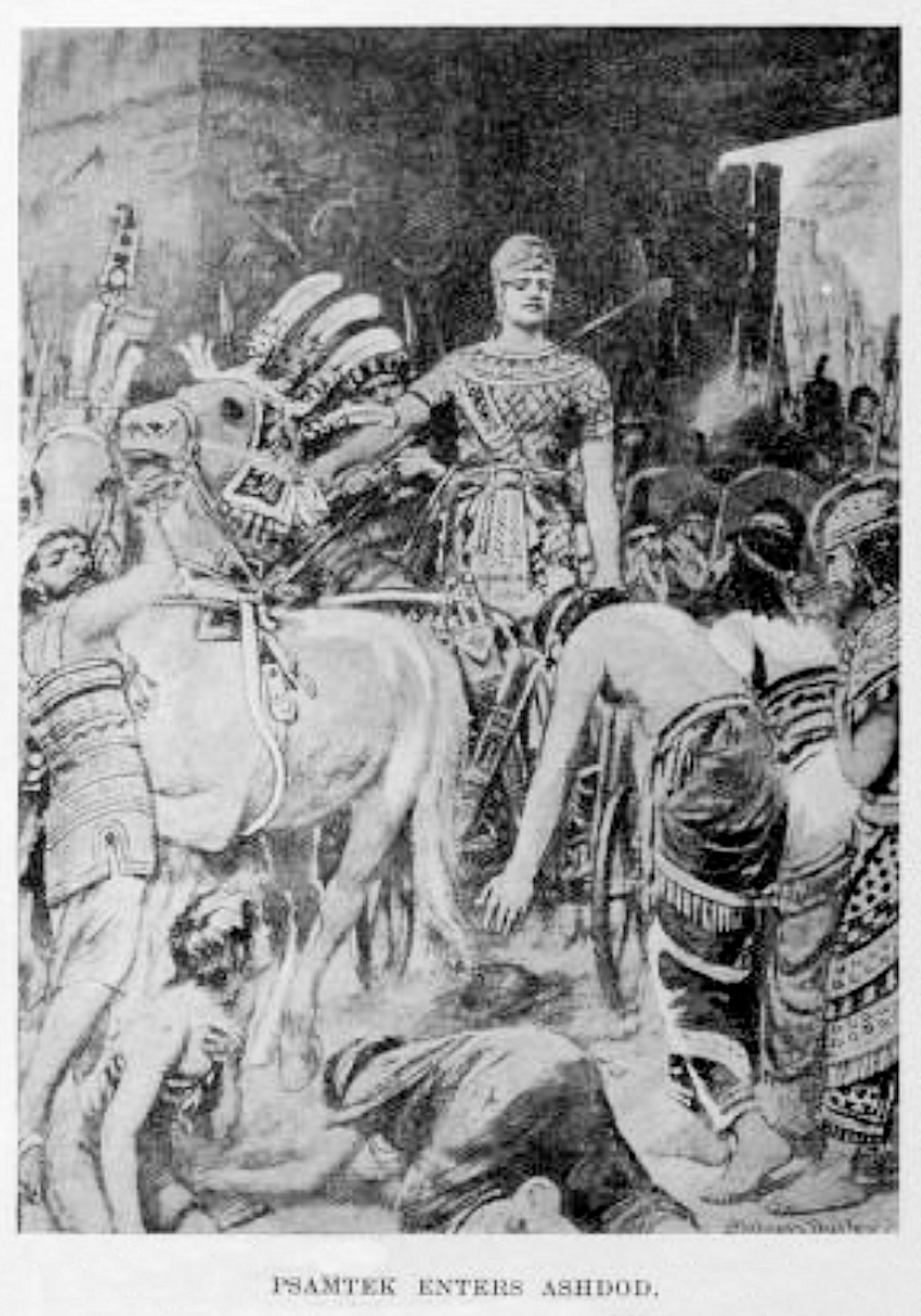
- Psamtik I enters Ashdod
| Date | c. 655 BC |
| Location | Ashdod, Neo-Assyrian Empire (Southern Levant) |
| Result | Egyptian victory. |

Belligerents
| Twenty-sixth dynasty of Egypt | Neo-Assyrian Empire |

Commanders and leaders
| Psamtik I | Unknown |

Strength
| Unknown | Unknown |

Casualties and losses
| Unknown | Unknown |

The Fall of Ashdod was the successful Egyptian assault on the city of Ashdod, one of the five cities of the famed Philistine pentapolis, located in southwestern Canaan, about 655 BC. According to the Greek historian Herodotus, pharaoh Psamtik I besieged Ashdod for 29 years. Ashdod had lost most of its inhabitants during those long years of siege.

== Background ==
Prior to the death of King Ashurbanipal sometime in 627 BC, the Assyrian Empire was engaged in almost constant warfare on multiple fronts, with nomadic tribesmen from the south, Chaldeans initiating uprisings, Elamites supporting such rebellions and Egyptians inciting further rebellion in the Levant. In the face of these multiple threats, the Assyrians under Ashurbanipal campaigned aggressively. Despite success, the Assyrians lost too many soldiers through years of debilitating warfare. In an effort to increase Assyria's standing in the East, Ashurbanipal abandoned Egypt and concentrated on Elam. However, this left Egypt more or less unchecked.

== Capture of Ashdod ==
Despite the previous hostility between the two powers, it appears that the Assyrians and the Egyptians did not go to war. Indeed, as late as 605 BC, the Egyptians were actively aiding the Assyrians in an attempt to help them against the Medes and the Babylonians. Moreover, the Nubian rulers of Egypt were driven out by the native Egyptians sometime around 650; therefore the Assyrians and the native Egyptians made natural allies against Nubian domination. The capture of Ashdod may have effectively reflected part of the transfer of power from the crumbling Assyrian Empire to the new Egyptian 26th Dynasty.
