= 610s BC =

Decade

This article concerns the period 619 BC – 610 BC.

== Events and trends ==
- 618 BC—Silphium discovered in Cyrene according to Theophrastus.
- 618 BC—King Qing of Zhou becomes king of the Zhou dynasty of China.
- 616 BC—Lucius Tarquinius Priscus becomes the fifth King of Rome (traditional date).
- 615 BC—Neo-Babylonian kingdom begin attacking Assyrian cities.
- 614 BC—Sack of Assur and Tarbiṣu by the Medes and Babylonians.
- 613 BC—King Zhuang of Chu ascends to the throne of Chu in China
- 612 BC—Ji Ban becomes king of the Zhou dynasty of China.
- 612 BC—An alliance of Medes, Persians, Scythians, Babylonians and Susianians besiege and conquer Nineveh at the Battle of Nineveh. King Sin-shar-ishkun of Assyria is killed in the sack.
- 612 BC—Ashur-uballit II attempts to keep the Assyrian empire alive by establishing himself as king at Harran.
- c. 612 BC— Babylon, capital of Babylonia becomes the largest city of the world, taking the lead from Nineveh, capital of Assyria.
- 612 BC—Fall of the Assyrian Empire and Rise of the Neo-Babylonian Empire.
- 612 BC—King Kuang of Zhou becomes king of the Zhou dynasty of China.
- 610 BC—Necho II succeeds Psamtik I (Psammetichus) as king of Egypt.

== Births ==
- c. 610 BC — Anaximander, Greek philosopher

== Deaths ==
- 619 BC — Sadyattes, king of Lydia
- 619 BC — King Xiang of Zhou, king of the Zhou dynasty of China
- 618 BC — Duke Gong of Cao, ruler of the state of Cao
- 617 BC — Ancus Marcius, legendary fourth king of Rome
- 615 or 590 BC — Rusa III, king of Urartu
- 614 BC — King Mu of Chu, king of Chu
- 613 BC — She (Qi), temporary ruler of Qi
- 613 BC — King Qing of Zhou, king of the Zhou dynasty
- 613 BC — Duke Zhao of Qi, ruler of Qi
- 612 BC — Sin-shar-ishkun of Assyria
- 610 BC — Psammetichus I, king of Egypt
