= 660s BC =

Decade

This article concerns the period 669 BC – 660 BC.

== Events ==
- 669 BC: Taharqa, king of Kush, invades and reconquers Egypt from the Assyrian Empire.
- 669 BC: Esarhaddon, king of Assyria, dies in Harran on his way to recover Egypt.
- 669 BC: Argos defeats the Spartans at Battle of Hysiae.
- 668 BC: Ashurbanipal, son of Esarhaddon, starts to rule Assyria.
- 668 BC: Shamash-shum-ukin, son of Esarhaddon, becomes King of Babylon.
- 668 BC: Nineveh, capital of Assyria becomes the largest city of the world, taking the lead from Thebes in Egypt (estimation).
- 667 BC: Traditional date of the founding of Byzantium by Megaran colonists under Byzas.
- 666 BC: Ashurbanipal sends a small Assyrian army corps to Egypt which recovers Lower Egypt from Taharqa's forces.
- 665 BC: Elamite king Urtak launches a surprise attack against Babylonia but is successfully driven back
- 665 BC: First naval battle recorded in Greek history, according to Thucydides.
- 665 BC: Pami II possibly succeeds Pedubast II.
- 665 BC: Lydia faces war with Cimmerians and sends an embassy to Assyria.
- 665 BC: Ashurbanipal was forced to war in Egypt again, this time as the country was invaded by Taharqa's designated successor, Tantamani.
- 665 BC: The Gambulu begin to rebel.
- 665 BC: A ten-year campaign against Media is launched by Assyria.
- 665 BC: Elam attacks Babylon, but fails.
- 665 BC: Eurycrates becomes King of Sparta.
- 665 BC: As late as 665 BC, the vassal rulers of Sais, Mendes, and Pelusium were still making overtures to Taharqa in Kush.
- 665 BC: Kushite territory was reduced to Upper Egypt and Nubia
- 665 BC: the Kushite king Tantamani invaded Lower Egypt again, and Necho I and Pakruru resisted the Kushite attack. Necho I died in battle and his son Psamtik I fled to Syria, while Pakruru became the spokesperson of the Delta kinglets during the peace negotiations with Tantamani at Memphis.
- 665 BC: Phraortes, king of the Median Empire is born. (approximate date)
- 665 BC: Xiqi, Chinese ruler of the State of Jin is born. (died 651 BC)
- 664 BC: First naval battle in Greek recorded history, between Corinth and Corcyra.
- 664 BC: Tantamani succeeds his uncle Taharqa as king of Kush. He invades Egypt to try to take it back.
- 664 BC: Necho I, puppet Pharaoh of Egypt, is killed by invading Kushite forces under Tantamani.
- 664 BC: Duke Xuan of Qin, ruler of the state of Qin, dies.
- Amon, king of Judah, is born.
- 664–663 BC: There was an extreme solar particle event comparable with the 774–775 carbon-14 spike. The estimated strength of the event is about 2 orders of magnitude stronger than anything that has been recorded instrumentally since the beginning of the Space Age.
- 663 BC: Assyrian army captures and sacks Thebes, Egypt, ending the Nubian period in Egypt.
- 663 BC: Siege of Tyre by the Assyrians under Ashurbanipal.
- 661 BC: Queen Macha of Ireland begins to rule alone, after the death of her husband Cimbaeth, according to the Annals of the Four Masters.
- 660 BC: Traditional founding date of Japan by Emperor Jimmu on 11 February.
- 660 BC: First known use of the Demotic script.
- 660 BC: Mythical founding of the Japanese royal family.
- 660 BC: Extreme solar particle event comparable with the event detected at AD 774/775
- 660 BC: Duke Cheng of Qin, ruler of the state of Qin, dies.

== Sources ==
- Adalı, Selim Ferruh (2017). "Cimmerians and the Scythians: the Impact of Nomadic Powers on the Assyrian Empire and the Ancient Near East". In Kim, Hyun Jin; Vervaet, Frederik Juliaan; Adalı, Selim Ferruh (eds.). Eurasian Empires in Antiquity and the Early Middle Ages Contact and Exchange between the Graeco- Roman World, Inner Asia and China. Cambridge, United Kingdom: Cambridge University Press. pp. 60–82. ISBN 978-1-107-19041-2.
- Adalı, Selim Ferruh (2023). "The Phantom Menace? The Chronology of Cimmerian Expeditions, Territories and Zones of Influence in Anatolia". In Draycott, Catherine M.; Branting, Scott; Lehner, Joseph W.; Özarslan, Yasemin (eds.). From Midas to Cyrus and Other Stories: Papers on Iron Age Anatolia in Honour of Geoffrey and Françoise Summers. BIAA Monograph Series. London, United Kingdom: British Institute at Ankara. pp. 209–228. ISBN 978-1-912-09011-2.
- Bouzek, Jan (2001). "Cimmerians and Early Scythians: the Transition from Geometric to Orientalising Style in the Pontic Area". In Tsetskhladze, G.R. (ed.). North Pontic Archaeology: Recent Discoveries and Studies. Leiden, Netherlands: Brill Publishers. pp. 33–44. ISBN 978-9-004-12041-9.
- Dale, Alexander (2015). "WALWET and KUKALIM: Lydian coin legends, dynastic succession, and the chronology of Mermnad kings". Kadmos. 54: 151–166. doi:10.1515/kadmos-2015-0008. S2CID 165043567.
- Fuchs, Andreas (2023). "The Medes and the Kingdom of Mannea". In Radner, Karen; Moeller, Nadine; Potts, Daniel T. (eds.). The Age of Assyria. The Oxford History of the Ancient Near East. Vol. 4. New York City, United States: Oxford University Press. pp. 674–768. ISBN 978-0-190-68763-2.
- Ivantchik, Askold (1993). Les Cimmériens au Proche-Orient [The Cimmerians in the Near East] (PDF) (in French). Fribourg, Switzerland; Göttingen, Germany: Éditions Universitaires Fribourg (Switzerland); Vandenhoeck & Ruprecht (Germany). ISBN 978-3-727-80876-0.
- Kõiv, Mait (2022). "Lydia, Phrygia and the Cimmerians: Mesopotamian and Greek evidence combined". In Mattila, Raija; Fink, Sebastian; Ito, Sanae (eds.). Evidence Combined: Western and Eastern Sources in Dialogue. Melammu Symposia. Vol. 11. Vienna, Austria: Austrian Academy of Sciences Press. pp. 261–294. ISBN 978-3-700-18573-4.
- Mellink, M. (1991). "The Native Kingdoms of Anatolia". In Boardman, John; Edwards, I. E. S.; Hammond, N. G. L.; Sollberger, E.; Walker, C. B. F. (eds.). The Assyrian and Babylonian Empires and other States of the Near East, from the Eighth to the Sixth Centuries B.C. The Cambridge Ancient History. Vol. 3, part 2. Cambridge, United Kingdom: Cambridge University Press. pp. 619–665. ISBN 978-1-139-05429-4.
- Spalinger, Anthony J. [in German] (1978). "The Date of the Death of Gyges and Its Historical Implications". Journal of the American Oriental Society. 98 (4): 400–409. doi:10.2307/599752. JSTOR 599752.
