= 680s BC =

Decade

680 BC in various calendars
- Gregorian calendar: 680 BC; DCLXXX BC
- Ab urbe condita: 74
- Ancient Egypt era: XXV dynasty, 73
- Pharaoh: Taharqa, 11
- Ancient Greek Olympiad (summer): 25th Olympiad (victor)¹
- Assyrian calendar: 4071
- Balinese saka calendar: N/A
- Bengali calendar: −1273 – −1272
- Berber calendar: 271
- Buddhist calendar: −135
- Burmese calendar: −1317
- Byzantine calendar: 4829–4830
- Chinese calendar: 庚子年 (Metal Rat); 2018 or 1811 — to — 辛丑年 (Metal Ox); 2019 or 1812
- Coptic calendar: −963 – −962
- Discordian calendar: 487
- Ethiopian calendar: −687 – −686
- Hebrew calendar: 3081–3082
- Hindu calendars
- Vikram Samvat: −623 – −622
- Shaka Samvat: N/A
- Kali Yuga: 2421–2422
- Holocene calendar: 9321
- Iranian calendar: 1301 BP – 1300 BP
- Islamic calendar: 1341 BH – 1340 BH
- Javanese calendar: N/A
- Julian calendar: N/A
- Korean calendar: 1654
- Minguo calendar: 2591 before ROC 民前2591年
- Nanakshahi calendar: −2147
- Thai solar calendar: −137 – −136
- Tibetan calendar: ལྕགས་ཕོ་བྱི་བ་ལོ་ (male Iron-Rat) −553 or −934 or −1706 — to — ལྕགས་མོ་གླང་ལོ་ (female Iron-Ox) −552 or −933 or −1705

This article concerns the period 689 BC – 680 BC.

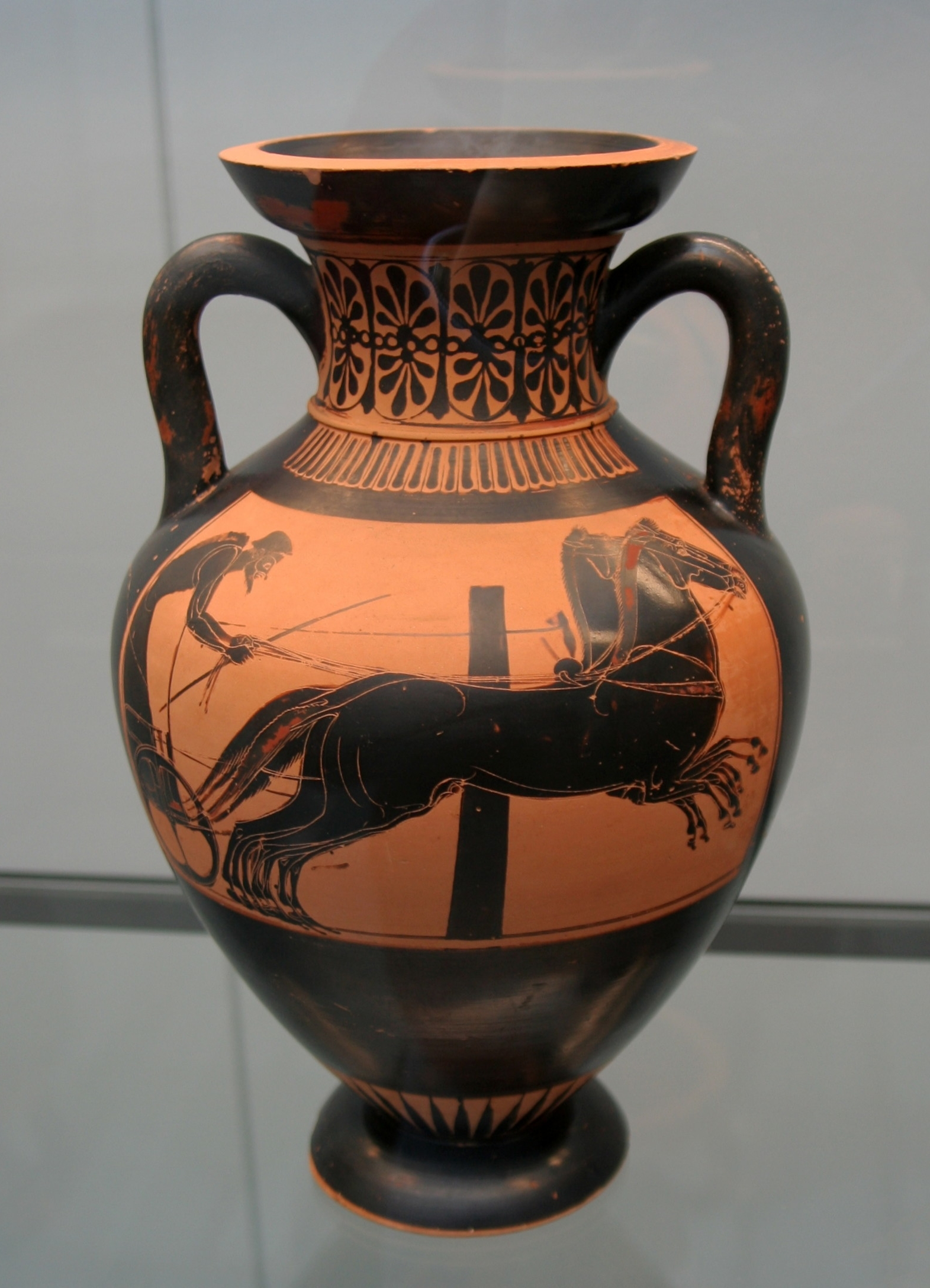
Chariot race on a black-figure hydria (Greece)

== Events and trends ==
- 689 BC—King Sennacherib of Assyria sacks Babylon. (or 691 BC)
- 688 BC—Traditional date for the founding of Gela in Sicily by colonists from Rhodes and Crete.
- 688 BC—Greece's games of the 23rd Olympiad are held at Olympia; boxing is added to the Olympic Games that are more and more intended as preparation for war. Icarius of Hyperesia wins the stadion race at the 23rd Olympic Games.
- 687 BC—Gyges becomes king of Lydia.
- 687 BC—Hezekiah succeeded by Manasseh as king of Judah, either this year or next or about a decade earlier.
- 685 BC—Traditional date of the foundation of Chalcedon by Megara or when it became a Greek colony.
- 684 BC—Spring and Autumn period: Duke Zhuang, ruler of the Chinese state of Lu, defeats Duke Huan of Qi in the Battle of Changshao.
- 684 BC—Cleoptolemus of Laconia wins the stadion race at the 24th Olympic Games.
- 684 BC—Taharqa gives orders to build a temple to Amun-Re at Kawa
- 682 BC—Urtaki succeeds Shilnak-Inshushinak as the king of Elam.
- 682 BC—Last year of the reign of Sennacherib, king of the Neo-Assyrian Empire.
- 682 BC—Ripunjaya, the last king of the Brihadratha dynasty, is assassinated by his minister Punika, who puts his son Pradyota on throne.
- 681 BC—King Sennacherib of Assyria is assassinated by one or two of his sons in the temple of the god Ninurta at Kalhu (Northern Mesopotamia) after a 24-year reign in which he defeated the Babylonians, made Nineveh (modern Iraq) a showplace, and diverted the waters of the Tigris River into a huge aqueduct to supply the city with irrigation.
- 681 BC—Sennacherib's second wife, Naqi'a (Zakitu), uses her wiles and influences to have the imperial council appoint her son Esarhaddon as her husband's successor in preference to the young man's two older brothers, who flee to Urartu (Armenia). Esarhaddon, unlike his father, is friendly toward Babylon and orders her reconstruction.
- 681 BC—Xi of Zhou becomes king of the Zhou Dynasty (China).
- 680 BC—Esarhaddon succeeds Sennacherib as king of Assyria.
- 680 BC—Greece's games of the 25th Olympiad is held at Olympia with the first equestrian event. A four-horse chariot race is run at the nearby hippodrome, slaves driving the chariots in a fierce competition that not infrequently ends in death. Thalpis of Laconia wins the stadion race at the 25th Olympic Games.
- 680 BC—A meteorite hits the Estonian island of Saaremaa, forming the Kaali crater (approximate date).

== Births ==
- 685 BC—Ashurbanipal, king of Assyria (d. c. 627 BC)
- 680 BC—Birth of Archilochus, Greek lyric poet (approximate date)

== Deaths ==
- 689 BC—Mushezib-Marduk, king of Babylon
- 687 BC—Hezekiah, king of Judah, either this year or next or about a decade earlier.
- 686 BC—Duke Xiang of Qi, ruler of the state of Qi
- 686 BC—Hezekiah, king of Judah, either this year or the previous or about a decade earlier.
- 682 BC—King Zhuang of Zhou, King of the Zhou dynasty of China.
- 681 BC—Sennacherib, king of Assyria
