= Assyrian conquest of Persia =

Assyrian campaigns in Parsua and Elam

Assyrian campaigns in Parsua and Elam
- Part of Assyrian expansion into the Zagros
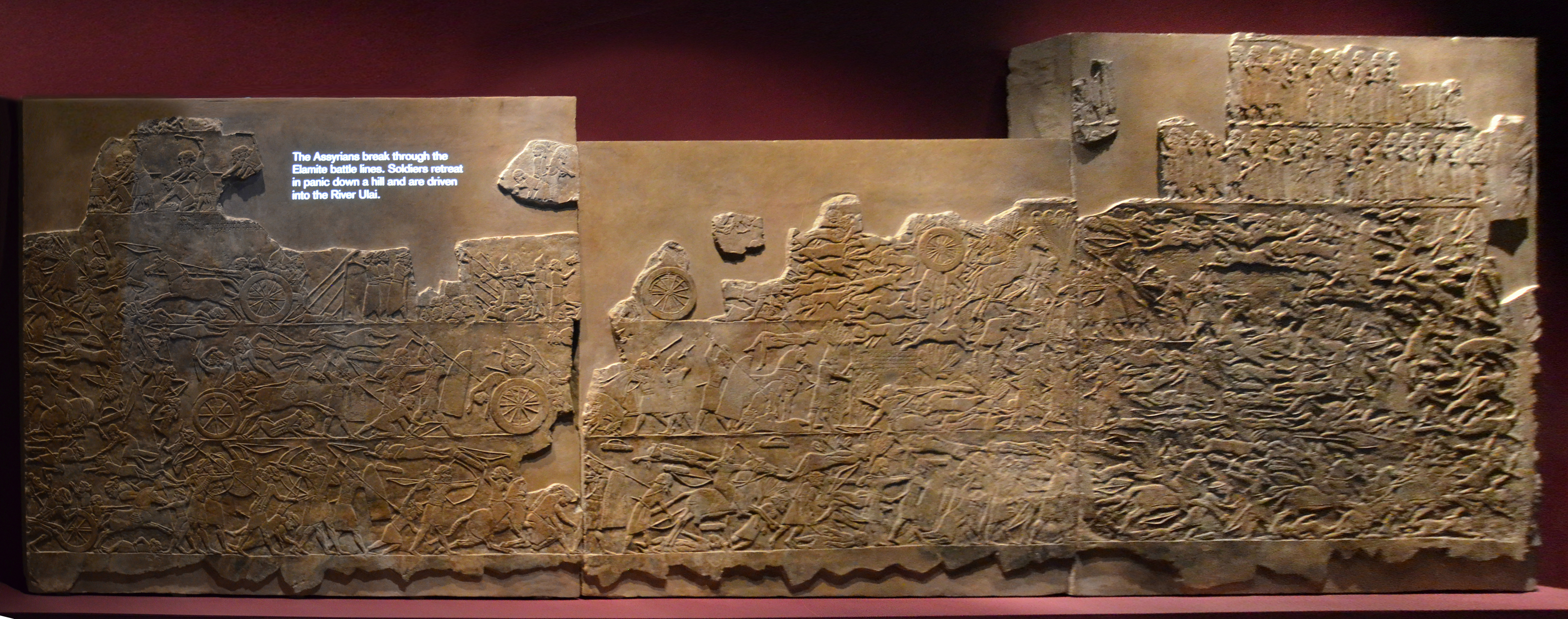
- Relief depicting the Battle of Ulai (653 BCE) between the Neo‑Assyrian Empire and Elam, from the British Museum collections.
Date	844–639 BC
Location	Parsua, Parsa, Elam, Zagros Mountains (modern western Iran)
Result	Assyrian victory
Territorial changes	Persia, Media and Elam fell to the sphere of the Assyrian influence

Belligerents
Neo-Assyrian Empire	Elam; Median tribes; Early Persian tribes (Parsua/Parsa)

Commanders and leaders
Shalmaneser III; Tiglath-Pileser III; Sargon II; Esarhaddon; Ashurbanipal	Humban-haltash III; Teumman; Urtak; Shutruk-Nakhunte II

Strength
20,000–70,000	15,000–45,000

Casualties and losses
Dead and wounded: 500–2,000 soldiers (estimated); Wounded: 1,000–2,500 (estimated); Captured: minimal; Civilian deaths: minimal; Equipment losses: a few chariots and weapons lost during battles	Dead or killed: 12,000–33,000 soldiers (estimated); Wounded: 6,000–13,000 soldiers (estimated); Captured: several thousand soldiers and civilians; Civilian deaths: significant during sieges; Equipment losses: chariots destroyed; bows, spears, shields, and fortifications heavily damaged

== Background ==
Clashes between the Elamites and the Assyrians had been ongoing for many years prior to 721 BC, the first recorded conflict between Elamites and Assyrians. For many centuries before that, the Elamites had made it a habit of intervening in Babylonian politics. Naturally this would have placed them in conflict with the Assyrians, who saw Babylon as within their sphere of influence. In 721 BC, the Babylonians rebelled against Assyria and Elamite forces attempted to aid Babylon in her revolt. Following this event, the Assyrians and Elamites clashed on numerous occasions: at the Tigris in 717 BC; along the Elamite coast as part of an amphibious invasion in 694 BC; and at the province of Der along with at the River Diyala in 693 BC (which may have been the same battle). For the most part, these battles were bloody and inconclusive. However, the Assyrians were able to obtain the upper hand for the most part, demonstrated by the failure of the Elamites to extend their power beyond the boundaries of Mesopotamia.

After a failed attack on Babylon in 655 BC, Elamite power soon began to collapse. At the Battle of Ulai in the plain of Susa, an Assyrian army assaulted strong Elamite defensive positions. The Elamites were soundly beaten and Teumman, the Elamite king, was beheaded during the battle. Although another Babylonian revolt saved Elam from immediate invasion, it would remain one of the most important objectives in the mind of Ashurbanipal.

== Campaign against Elam ==
In 648 BC, the Elamite city of Susa was razed to the ground; it was to be a terrible portent of events to come. In 639 BC, the Assyrians moved their entire army from the west to destroy their enemies.

=== Collapse of Elam ===
The defeats inflicted by Assyria on Elamite offensives were one of many problems facing the Elamites; civil war had erupted in the land, whilst her northern borders were being overrun by the Persians. In 639 BC, Ashurbanipal moved into Elam and proudly documented the vengeance against Elamite incursions:

For a distance of a month and twenty-five days' journey I devastated the provinces of Elam. Salt and sihlu I scattered over them... The dust of Susa, Madaktu, Haltemash and the rest of the cities I gathered together and took to Assyria... The noise of people, the tread of cattle and sheep, the glad shouts of rejoicing, I banished from its fields. Wild asses, gazelles and all kinds of beasts of the plain I caused to lie down among them, as if at home.

— Ashurbanipal

With Elam destroyed, the Assyrians returned to find their empire falling apart; years of war had destroyed their ability to wage it. Within 34 years of Elam's destruction, Assyria fell as an independent political entity in the Middle East forever.

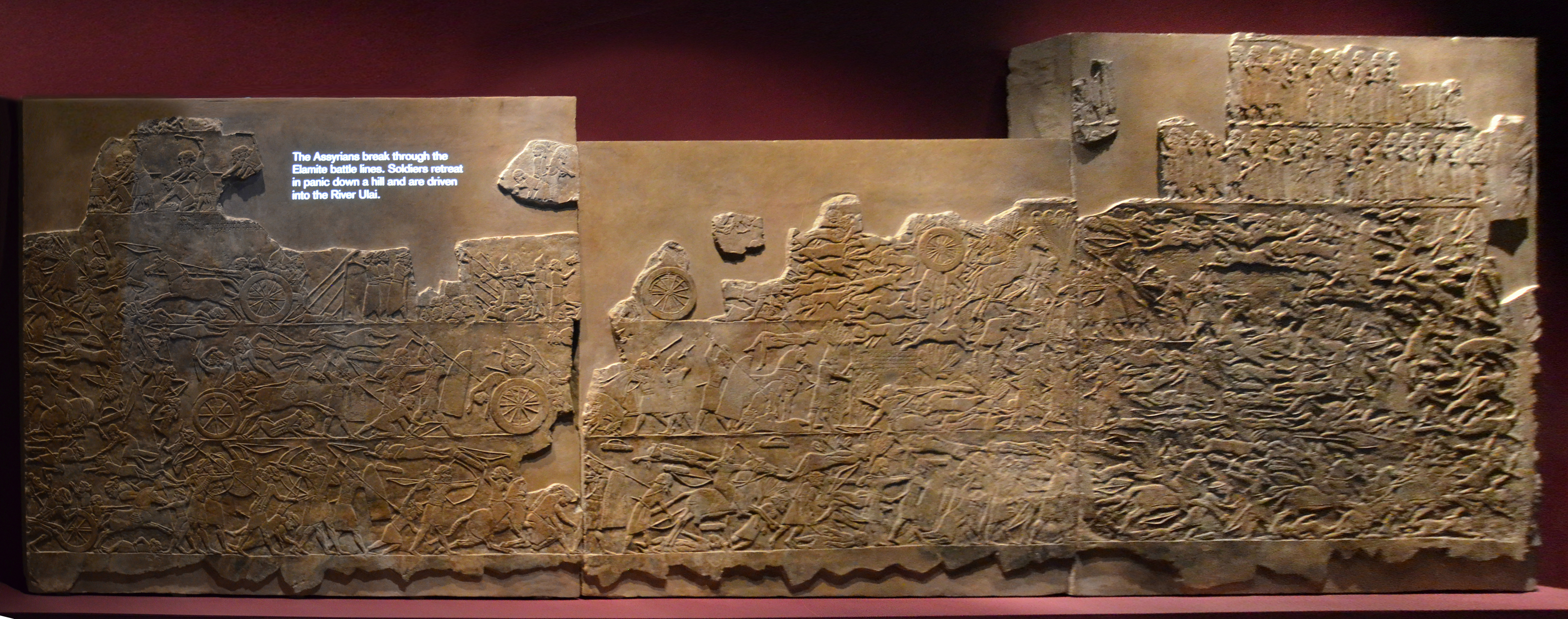
Relief of the Battle of Ulai, British Museum.

== See also ==
- Battle of Susa
- Battle of Ulai
- Battle of Diyala River
- Battle of Halule
