= Indabibi =

Ruler of ancient Elam (fl. 649 BC)

Indabibi was a ruler of ancient Elam in 649 BCE and perhaps 648. He is sometimes referred to as Indabigash. He was the successor of Tammaritu II and the predecessor of Humban-Haltash III. Elam was located to the east of the more powerful Assyrian Empire, and the reign of Indabibi occurred during the reign of Assyrian king Ashurbanipal (668 - c. 617).

In 649 BC, then-Elamite king Tammaritu II was deposed in an uprising and fled to Assyria's king Ashurbanipal, at which point Indabibi took the throne. At this time, Ashurbanipal was engaged in a conflict with his brother, Shamash-shum-ukin, king of Babylon, who was attempting to gain control of the Assyrian Empire. Tammaritu II militarily supported Shamash-shum-ukin. During a battle, one of his generals, Indabibi, switched sides, and Tammaritu escaped to Nineveh in either 650 or 649 BC. Thus began the brief rule of Indabibi over Elam.

Assyrian records give contradictory reports concerning Indabibi's relationship to Assyria: one source, written during Indabibi's rule records that Indabibi was an ally and "brother" of Ashurbanipal, while a source written two years later has a different opinion.

As relations soured, Ashurbanipal send a demand that Indabibi extradite to him a number of rebellious subjects who were taking refuge in Elam. Indabibi delivered some of these, but withheld others. Later Ashurbanipal sent a messenger to demand the extradition of the remaining subjects, but the message did not reach Elam.

The Annals of Ashurbanipal record that Ashurbanipal declared war against Indabibi. As Ashurbanipal's armies approached Elam, the Elamites revolted and killed Indabibi in 648.

Indabibi was then replaced by Humban-haltash III.

== See also ==
- List of rulers of Elam
