= Liuxia Hui =

Chinese politician

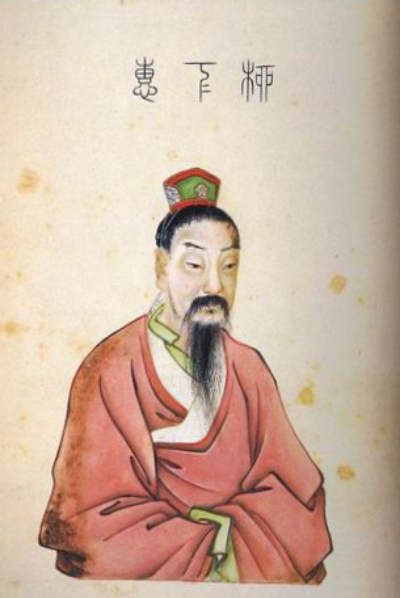
Qing dynasty illustration

Zhan Huo (Chinese: 展獲; pinyin: Zhǎn Huò; 720–621 BCE), courtesy name Qin (禽; changed at 50 years of age to Ji 季), was an ancient Chinese politician. He was canonised as Hui (惠), and is now commonly known as Liuxia Hui (柳下惠).

He was governor of the District of Liuxia (柳下) in the Lu State. He was a man of eminent virtue, and is said on one occasion to have held a lady in his lap without the slightest imputation on his moral character. When he died, his wife insisted on pronouncing a funeral oration over his body, arguing that none knew his great merits so well as her.
