= 690s BC =

Decade

This article concerns the period 699 BC – 690 BC.

== Events and trends ==
- 699 BC—Hallashu-Inshushinak (Khallushu) succeeds Shuttir-Nakhkhunte as king of the Elamite Empire.
- 699 BC—Manasseh succeeds Hezekiah as king of Judah. The first king who did not have an experience with the Kingdom of Israel, Manasseh ruled with his mother, Hephzibah, as regent.
- 699 BC—Sennacherib carries out his fifth military campaign in Babylonia, a series of raids against the villages around the foot of Mount Judi, located to the northeast of Nineveh.
- 698 BC—Death of Chuzi I, ruler of the state of Qin
- 698 BC—Death of Duke Xi of Qi, ruler of the state of Qi
- 697 BC—Birth of Duke Wen of Jin in China.
- 697 BC—Death of King Huan of Zhou in China.
- 697 BC—Manasseh becomes co-ruler with King Hezekiah of Judah.
- 696 BC—Zhou Zhuang Wang becomes king of the Zhou Dynasty of China.
- 696 BC—Cimmerian forces begin a conquest of Phrygia (modern Turkey), having failed in their efforts to defeat the Assyrians and moved into Anatolia.
- 696 BC—Possible migration of the Armenians (approximate date).
- 696 BC—Pantacles of Athens wins the stadion race at the 21st Olympic Games.
- 694 BC—Duke Xiang of Qi and Duke Huan of Lu meet at Luo(濼). Duke Huan of Lu and his wife, Wen Jiang goes to Qi.
- 694 BC—Duke Huan of Lu dies in Qi, and Prince Peng Sheng(彭生) is killed.
- 694 BC—Troops of Qi killed Zheng-zi Wei(7th ruler of Zheng) and Gao Qumi(高渠弥). Ji Zhong(祭仲) invited Zheng-zi Ying(8th ruler of Zheng) from Chen and helped him assume the throne.
- 694 BC—Duke Hei Jian(黒肩) of Zhou killed King Zhuang of Zhou and plotted to help Prince Ke(克) assume the throne. Xin Bo(辛伯) reported it to King Zhuang, and killed Duke Hei Jian. Prince Ke defected to Yan.
- 694 BC—Death of Ashur-nadin-shumi, Assyrian king of Babylon
- 694 BC—Death of Duke Huan of Lu, ruler of the state of Lu
- 694 BC—Death of Luli, king of Tyre
- 693 BC—Babylon is destroyed by the Assyrian king Sennacherib, but the city will be rebuilt in even greater splendor and luxury. He fights his way back north and captures various cities along the River Euphrates (or 691 BC or 689 BC).
- 693 BC—Death of Nergal-ushezib, king of Babylonia
- 692 BC—Pantacles wins the stadion race for a second time and the diaulos at the 22nd Olympic Games.
- 692 BC—Karib'il Watar of Saba' is recorded as having given "gifts" (tribute) to King Sennacherib of Assyria.
- 691 BC—King Sennacherib of Assyria defeats king Humban-nimena of Elam in the Battle of Halule.
- 690 BC—Duke Xiang of Qi, Duke Xuan of Chen, Zheng-zi Ying met at Chui(垂).
- 690 BC—Marquis of Ji(紀) does not surrender to Qi, and passes the throne to his younger brother, Ji Ji(紀季).
- 690 BC—Death of King Wu of Chu
- 690 BC—Death of Xuan Jiang, Chinese Duchess.
- 690 BC—Taharqa, a king of the Twenty-fifth Dynasty, ascends the throne of Egypt (approximate date)
- c. 690 BC—Death of Manava, author of the Indian geometric text of Sulba Sutras.
- 690s BC—W'rn Hywt of D'mt in Ethiopia appears in the inscriptional record and mentions the king of Saba', Karib'il Watar.
- Greek colonization of the Mediterranean in the next two centuries will be motivated primarily by a need to find new food sources as Greece's population expands. The barren and rocky soil of the Greek Peninsula is inadequate to meet the people's alimentary needs (approximate date).
