= 630s BC =

Decade

This article concerns the period 639 BC – 630 BC.

== Events and trends ==
- 639 BC—Interregnum ends and Ancus Marcius becomes the king of Rome.
- 637 BC—Sadyattes becomes king of Lydia.
- 636 BC—Duke Wen of Jin ascends to power in the State of Jin during the Zhou dynasty of China.
- 635 BC—Alyattes becomes king of Lydia
- 632 BC—Cylon, Athenian noble, seizes the Acropolis in a failed attempt to become king.
- 632 BC—In the Battle of Chengpu, the Chinese kingdom of Jin and her allies defeat the kingdom of Chu and her allies.
- c. 631 BC—Founding of Cyrene, a Greek colony in Libya (North Africa).

== Significant people ==
- c. 638 BC—Birth of Solon, lawmaker of Athens
- 637 BC—Death of Ardys, Lydia
- 637 BC—Death of Duke Xiang of Song, China
- 637 BC—Death of Duke Hui of Jin, predecessor to Duke Huai of Jin
- 637 BC—Death of Duke Huai of Jin, ruler of the state of Jin
- c. 635 BC—Birth of Thales, Greek philosopher (d. 543 BC)
- 635 BC—Death of Sadyattes, Lydia
- c. 634 BC—Birth of Jehoiakim, 18th king of Judah
- c. 633/632 BC—Birth of Jehoahaz, 17th king of Judah
- c. 633 BC—Death of Phraortes, second king of the Medes
- 633 BC—Death of Duke Xiao of Qi, ruler of the state of Qi
- 632 BC—Cheng Dechen, Chinese prime minister of Chu
- c. 632 BC—Cylon, Athenian nobleman and usurper
- c. 631 BC—Death of Ashurbanipal, Assyrian king
- c. 630 BC—Birth of Sappho
