= Hamanu =

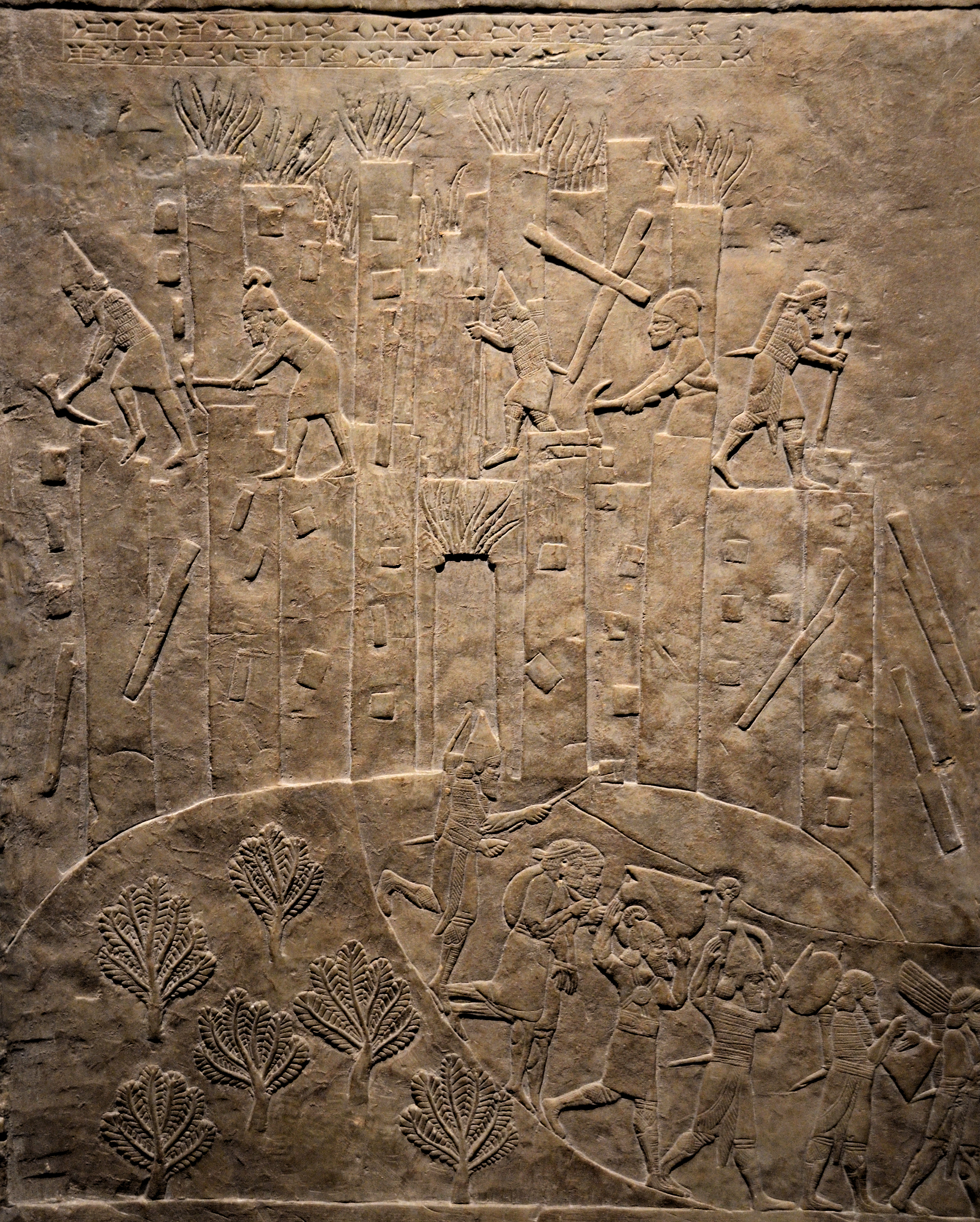
Ashurbanipal's campaign against Elam is triumphantly recorded in this relief showing the destruction of Hamanu. Here, flames rise from the city as Assyrian soldiers topple it with pickaxes and crowbars and carry off the spoils. 645-635 BCE. British Museum BM 124919.

Hamanu was a city of Elam, which was razed by Ashurbanipal during the Assyrian conquest of Elam in 645-635 BCE. Ashurbanipal wrote in his inscriptions:

"The city of Hamanu, a royal city of the land of Elam, I besieged, I conquered, its booty I carried off."

— Siege of Hamanu, British Museum.

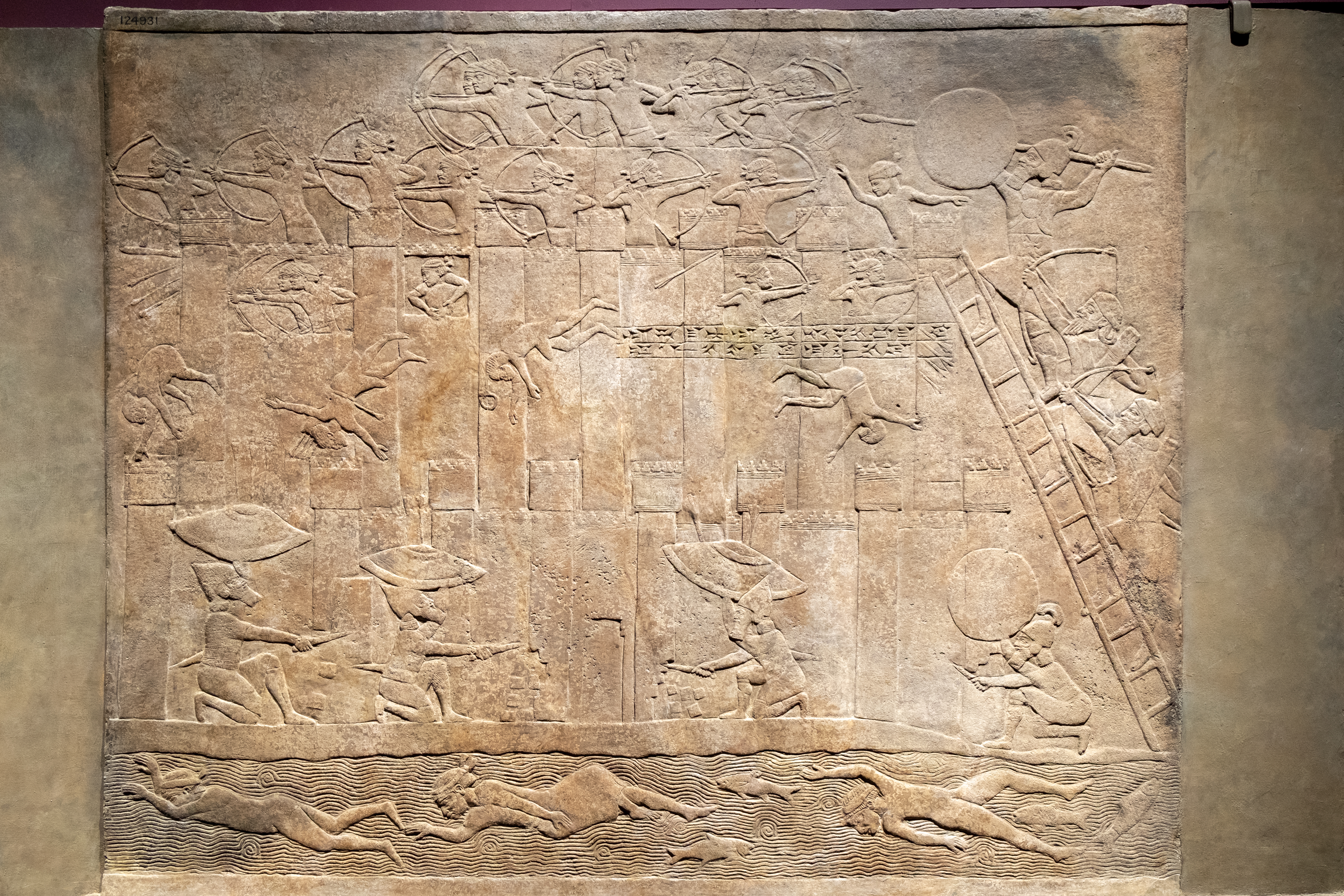
The siege of the city of Hamanu in Elam, 645-635 BCE. Inscription: "The city of Hamanu, a royal city of the land of Elam, I besieged, I conquered, its booty I carried off." British Museum.

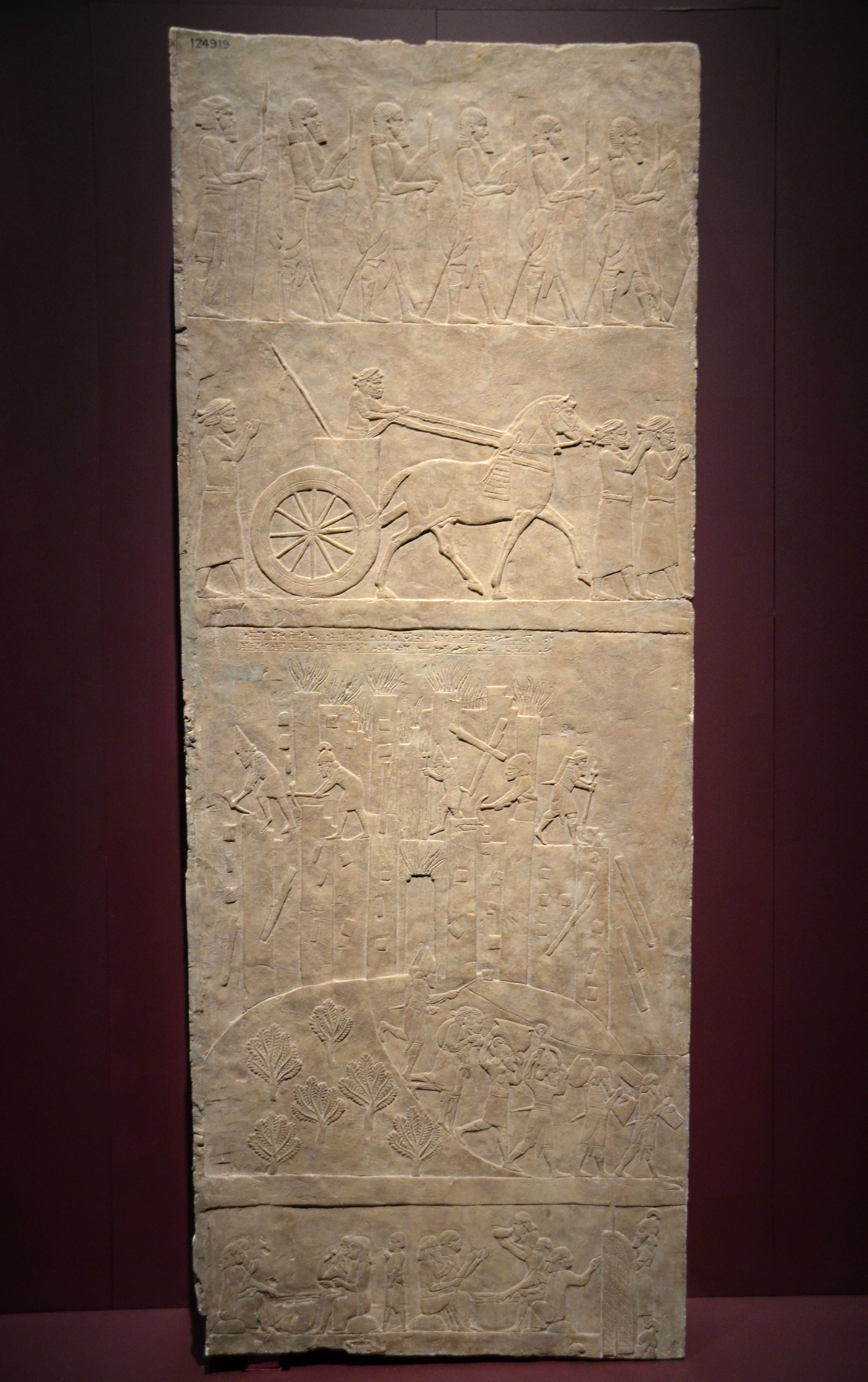
Relief of the conquest of Hamanu

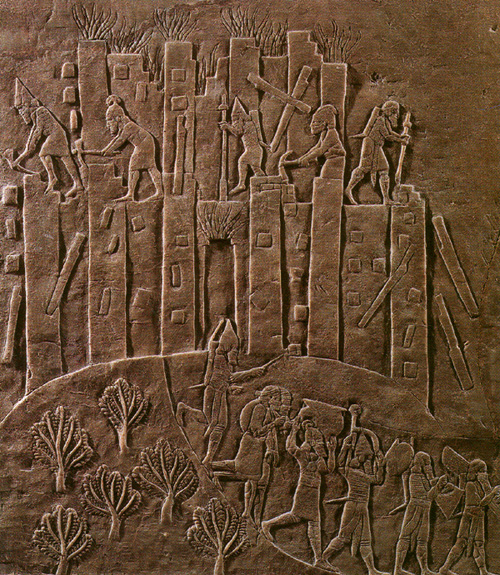
Detail of the dismantlement of the city
