= 650s BC =

Decade

This article concerns the period 659 BC – 650 BC.

== Events and trends ==
- Occupation begins at Maya site of Piedras Negras, Guatemala.
- First evidence of written Olmec language from the New World. Pyramid building continues.
- 659 BC — The enemy city of Alba Longa is destroyed by the Romans.
- 658 BC — End of the rule of Duke Zhuang in Yan.
- 658 BC — End of the rule of Miltiades in Athens.
- 658 BC — End of the rule of Énna Derg in Ireland (according to Foras Feasa ar Éirinn by Geoffrey Keating).
- c. 657 BC — King Gyges of Lydia establishes a state monopoly in metal coinage, making it illegal for individuals to issue the bean-shaped lumps of electrum used as a medium of exchange in place of commodities.
- 657 BC — Cypselus becomes the first tyrant of Corinth.
- 657 BC — The Li Ji Unrest is a series of events from 657BC to 651BC that takes place during the Spring and Autumn period, caused by Li Ji, the concubine of Duke Xian of Jin, in order to put his son Xiqi onto the throne of Jin.
- 656 BC — Thebes submits to the Egyptian ruler Psamtik I of Sais, who has allied himself with Gyges of Lydia and employs Libyan soldiers in a rebellion against Assyrian rule with help from Carian and Ionian mercenaries. Psamtik permits the city's mayor Mentuemhat to retain his position, who is not only the most powerful Theban but also the fourth prophet of Amon.
- 656 BC — Psamtik I extends his control over all of Egypt. End of Twenty-fifth Dynasty.
- 656 BC — King Shamash-shum-ukin of Babylon forms a secret alliance with Arabs, Aramaeans, Elamites, Persians, and Egyptians against his half brother Ashurbanipal.
- 655 BC — The Assyrian army invade Elam and overtake its twin capital cities Madaktu and Susa and install a king that is pro-Assyrian on the throne.
- 655 BC — Stagira on the Chalkidiki peninsula is founded by Ionian settlers from Andros.
- c. 654 BC — Enna is founded in Sicily.
- 654 BC — Traditional date of the foundation of Abdera in Thrace by colonists from Clazomenae.
- 654 BC — Traditional date of foundation of Akanthos by Andros.
- 654 BC — Traditional date of foundation of Lampsacus by Phocaea.
- 653 BC — Elamite forces attack southern Babylon. A large Assyrian army sent by king Ashurbanipal defeat the Elamites, in the Battle of Ulai, and kill their king, Teumman. He is succeeded by his nephew Ummanigash.
- 653 BC — Atta-Khumma-In-Shushinak and Khumbanigash II succeed Shilhak-In-Shushinak and Tempti-Khumma-In-Shushinak as kings of the Elamite Empire.
- 652 BC — Babylonia rises in revolt under Shamash-shum-ukin against the Assyrians.
- 652 BC — Guan Zhong urges the Duke of Qi to maintain the respect of the other states by refusing the offer of the son of a recently defeated state's ruler to ally himself with Qi if Qi would help him depose his father.
- 651 BC — King Xiang of Zhou becomes king of the Zhou dynasty of China.
- 651 BC — King Ashurbanipal defeats the Babylonian army of his half brother Shamash-shum-ukin and surrounds the fortified city of Babylon. Beginning a 3-year siege during which the Assyrians will defeat Shamash-shum-ukin's allies.
- 651 BC — King Teispes of Anshan (Persia) sends help to Shamash-shum-ukin but his heirs will later be obliged to accept Assyrian overlordship.
- 651 BC — The Li Ji Unrest ends, resulting in the deaths of Li Ji, Xian, Xiqi and Zhuozi. After the revolt Duke Hui of Jin becomes ruler of the State of Jin.
- 650 BC — The town of Abdera in Thrace is founded by colonists from Clazomenae.
- First evidence of writing in the New World, among the Olmec Winters, C.A. (1984a). Blacks in ancient America. ColorLines, 3(2), 27–28.
- 650 BC — A climate change affects all the Bronze Age cultures in Europe with colder and wetter climate, and tribes from the Scandinavian Nordic Bronze Age cultures are pushed downwards into the European continent.
- 650 BC–625 BC — Wine pitcher (oinochoe), from Rhodes, is made. It is now at Museum of Fine Arts, Boston.
- 650 BC — The city of Ancient Carthage acquires independence from Tyre.
- c. 650 BC — Thales discovered the first theorems related to circles.
- 650 BC — End of the Second Messenian War.

== Significant people ==
- 653 BC — Death of Tantamani, last king of the Twenty-fifth Dynasty of Egypt
- 652 BC — Death of Zhou Hui Wang, king of the Zhou dynasty of China.
- 652 BC — First recorded mention of King Kuras of Parsumas, possibly the same as King Cyrus I of Anshan, head of the Achaemenid dynasty
- c. 650 BC — Death of Mentuemhat, Theban Egyptian official
