= Humban-haltash III =

Humban Haltash III
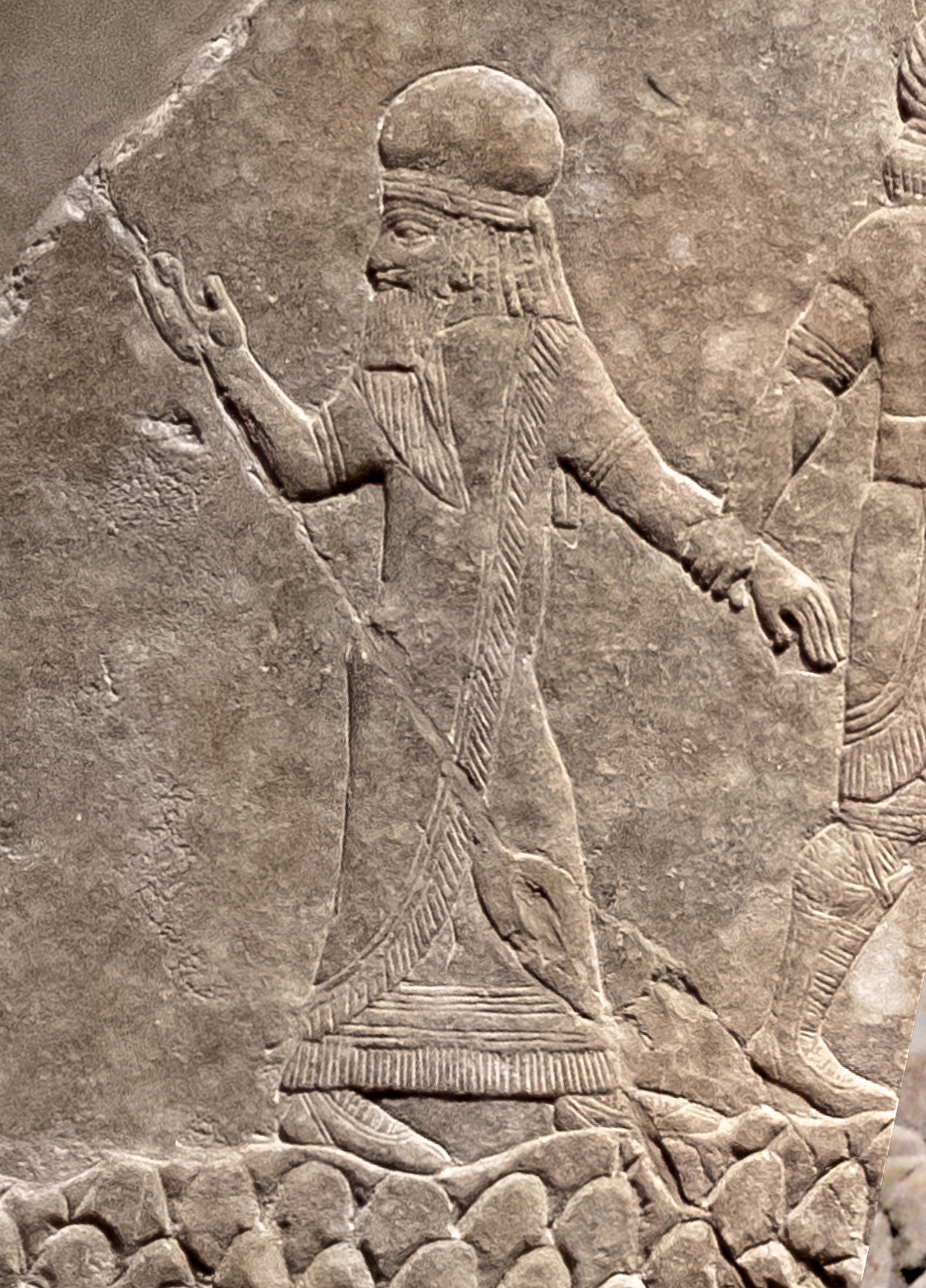
- Ummanaldash, King of Elam, being arrested by Assyrian troops, circa 645-640 BCE.

King of Elam
- Reign: 650 BC – 647 BC
- Predecessor: Tammaritu II
- Successor: Ashurbanipal
- Died: after 647 BC; Assyria
- House: Elamite

Humban-haltash III or Umanaldash was the last major ruler of Elam. He was defeated and captured by the Assyrian king Ashurbanipal.

== Reign ==
He belonged to the Humban-Tahrid, "Neo-Elamite", dynasty (c.830–521 BC). He became king 650 BC. During his kingdom, the Assyrian people attacked Elam and occupied Madektu. This facilitated their way to the Karkheh river. In 647 BC, Susa fell in the Battle of Susa and Ashurbanipal captured Humban Haltash. Ashurbanipal wrote:

Susa, the great holy city, abode of their gods, seat of their mysteries, I conquered. I entered its palaces, I opened their treasuries where silver and gold, goods and wealth were amassed... I destroyed the ziggurat of Susa. I smashed its shining copper horns. I reduced the temples of Elam to naught; their gods and goddesses I scattered to the winds. The tombs of their ancient and recent kings I devastated, I exposed to the sun, and I carried away their bones toward the land of Ashur. I devastated the provinces of Elam and on their lands I sowed salt.

— Ashurbanipal

Ashurbanipal's inscriptions and carvings at his palace in Nineveh show a humiliated Humban-haltash being forced to serve food at an Assyrian banquet. It is unclear what happened to Humban-haltash after this.

== Gallery ==
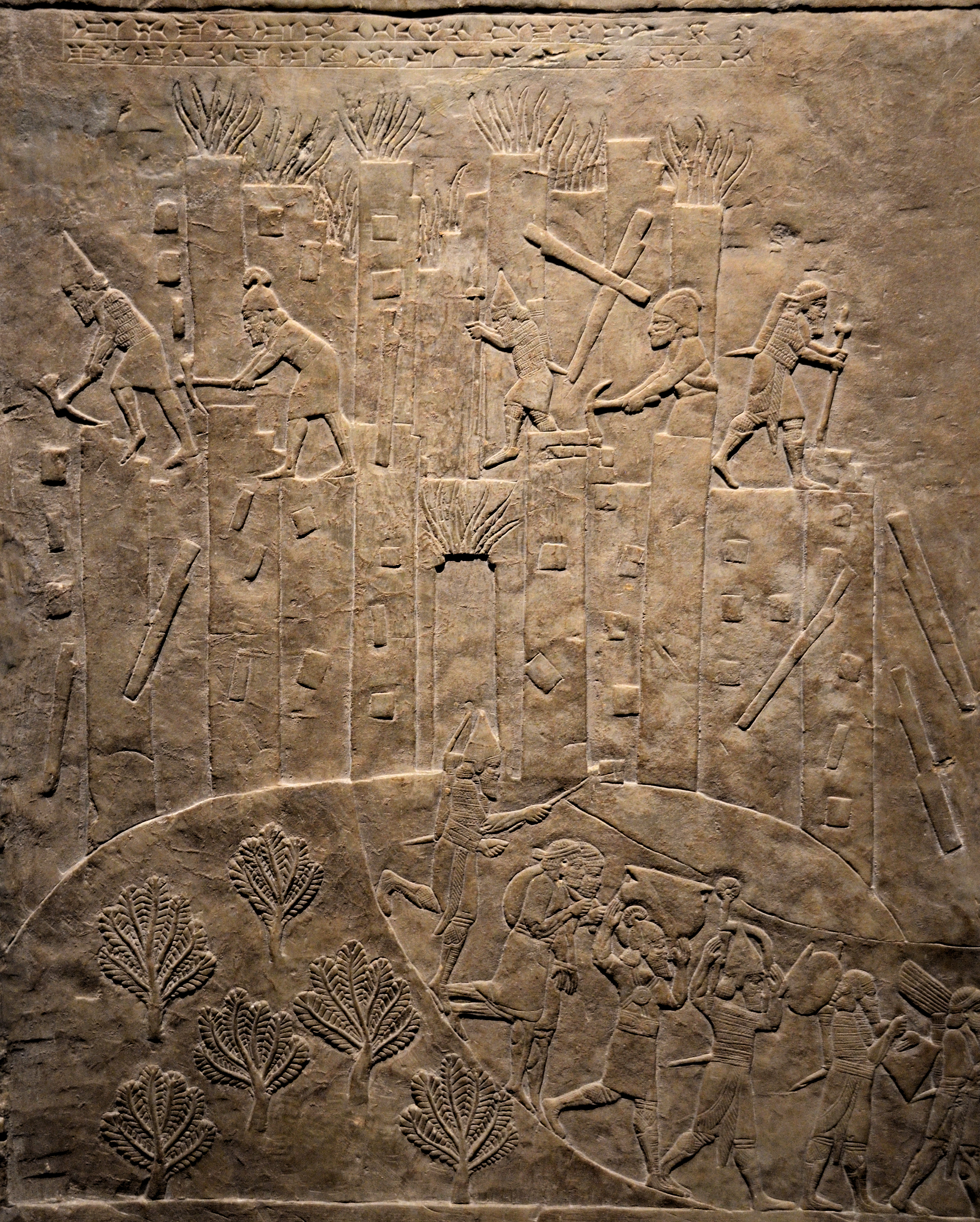
Ashurbanipal's campaign against Elam is triumphantly recorded in this relief showing the destruction of Hamanu. Here, flames rise from the city as Assyrian soldiers topple it with pickaxes and crowbars and carry off the spoils. British Museum.

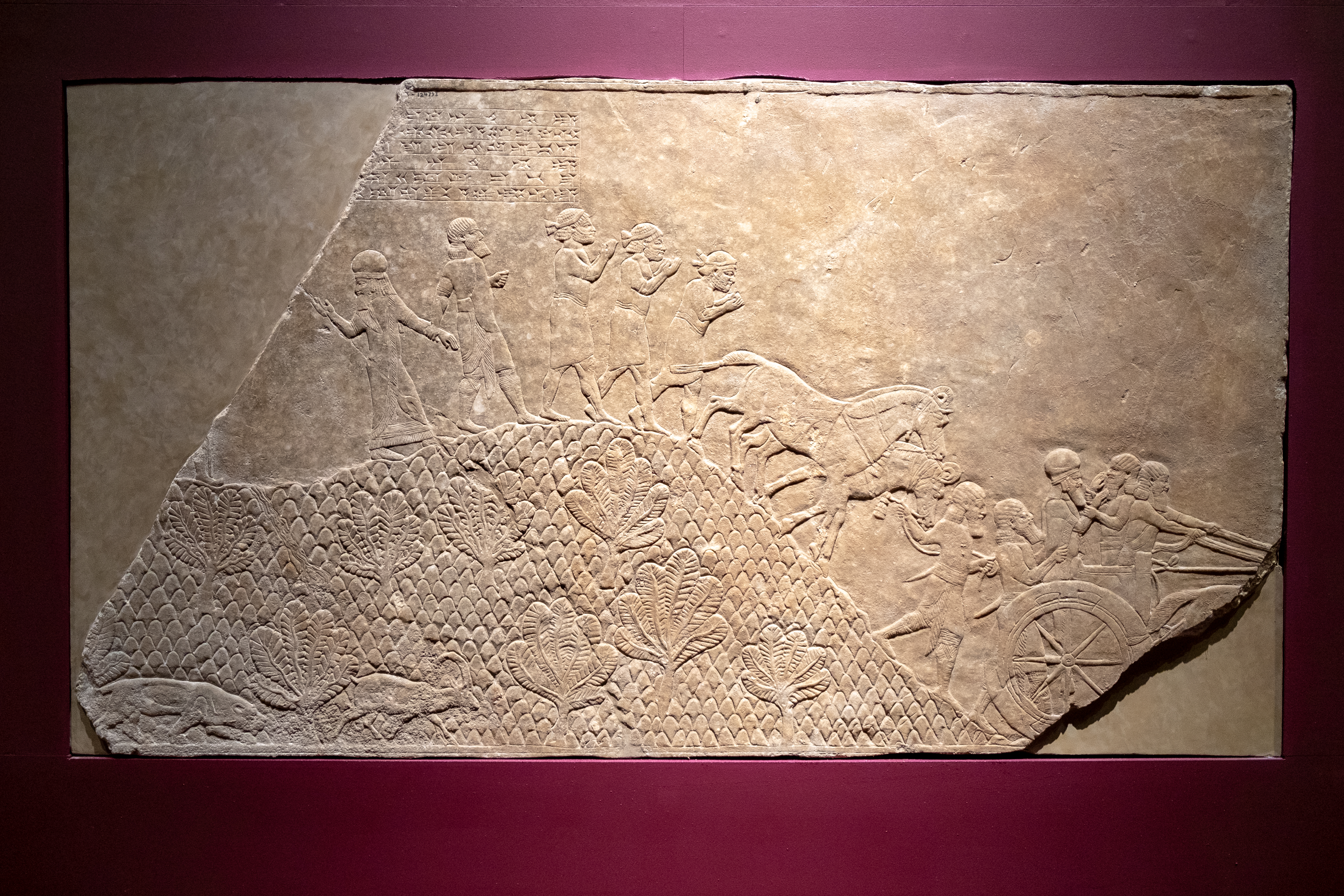
The capture of Ummanaldash, King of Elam by the Assyrians. 645-640 BCE.

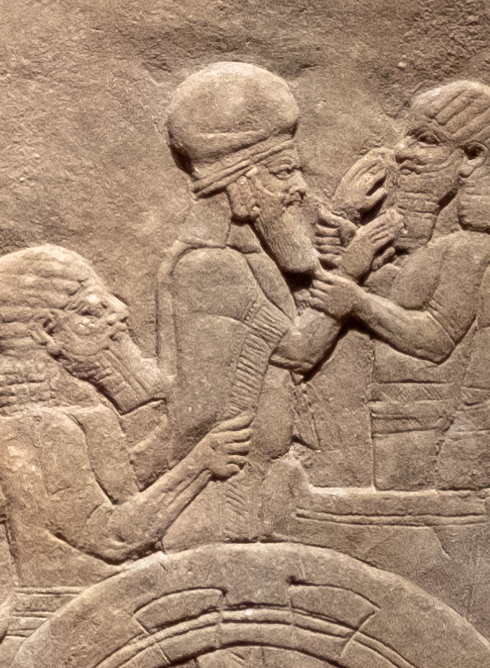
Ummanaldash, King of Elam being taken to Nineveh by the Assyrians 645-640 BCE.

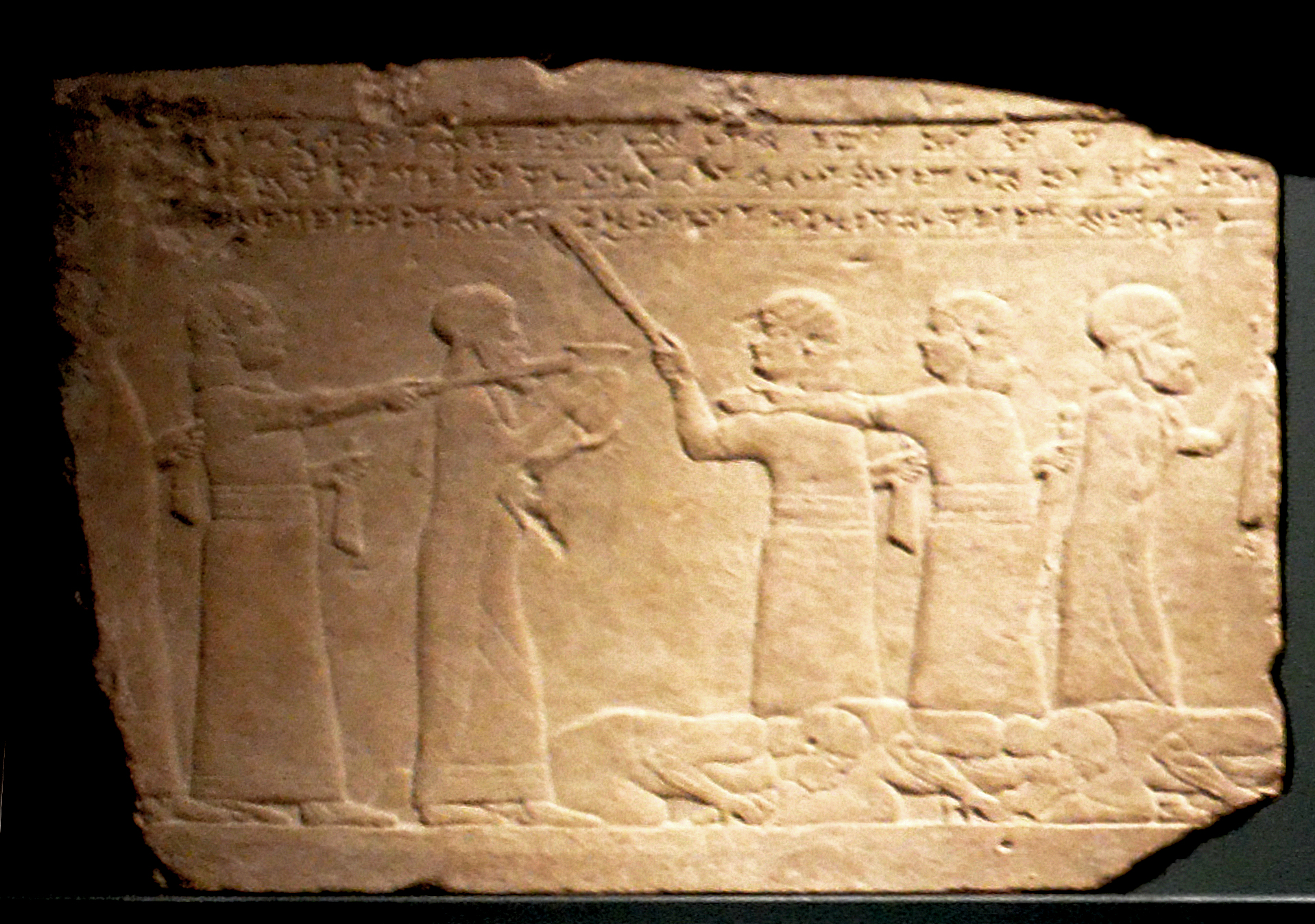
Humiliation of the Elamite King, forced to serve food at the court of Ashurbanipal. Inscription "...the kings of Elam, whom with the aid of Ashur and Ninlil my hands captured . . . they stood(?), and their own hands prepared their royal meal, and they brought it in before me".

== See also ==
- Elam
- List of rulers of Elam
