= 620s BC =

Decade

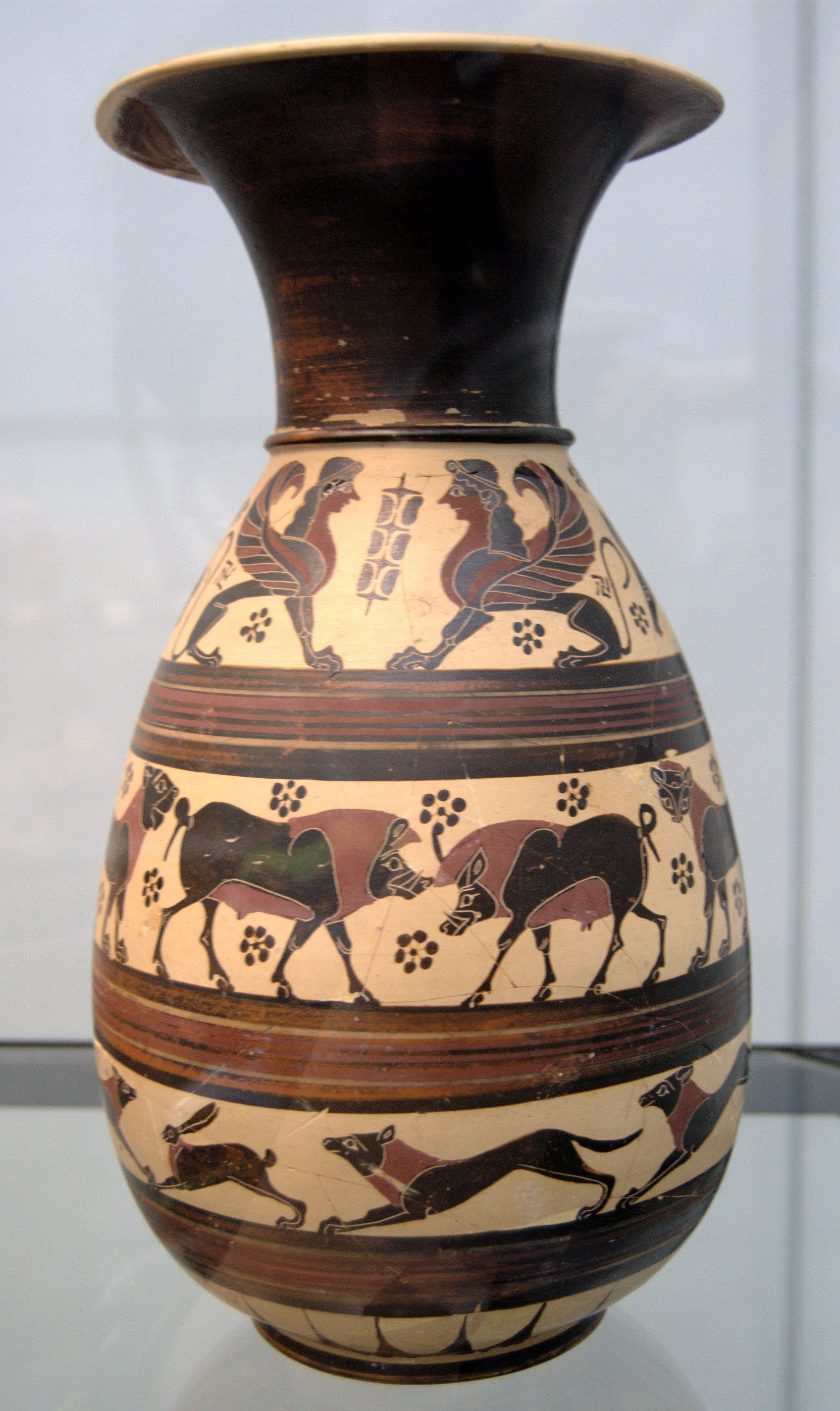
Corinthian oil jug from circa 620 BC at the Staatliche Antikensammlungen

This article concerns the period 629 BC – 620 BC.

== Events and trends ==
- 628 BC—Traditional date of the foundation of Selinus by Megara Hyblaea.
- c. 627 BC—Sinsharishkun succeeds his brother Ashur-etil-ilani as king of Assyria.
- 627 BC—Creation of Durrës, at the time known as Epidamnus.
- 627 BC—Spring and Autumn period: Jin defeats Qin in the Battle of Xiao
- 626 BC—Jeremiah begins his ministry in the Kingdom of Judah.
- 626 BC—Nabopolassar revolts against Assyria, founds the Neo-Babylonian Empire.
- 625 BC—Medes and Babylonians assert their independence from Assyria and attack Nineveh (approximate date).
- c. 625 BC—Cyaxares becomes king of the Medes.
- c. 625 BC—Orientalizing period of vases ends in Ancient Greece.
- c. 623 BC—Sin-shar-ishkun succeeds his brother Assur-etel-ilani as king of Assyria.
- c. 622 BC—The finding of one of the five books of Moses in Jerusalem by king Josiah.
- 622 or 621 BC - Draco makes the first law code for Ancient Greece.

== Significant people ==
- 628 BC—Death of Duke Wen of Jin, China.
- c. 628 BC—Commonly accepted date for the Birth of Zoroaster.
- c. 627 BC—Death of Ashur-etil-ilani, Assyrian king
- 627 BC—Death of Cypselus, Greek tyrant of Corinth
- 627 BC—Death of Kandalanu, Babylonian king
- c. 626 BC—Birth of Habakkuk.
- 626 BC—Death of King Cheng of Chu, king of the state of Chu
- 625 BC—Death of Yuan Taotu, China.
- c. 624 BC—Birth of Thales.
- c. 623 BC—Birth of Buddha.
- c. 622 BC—Birth of Ezekiel.
- 622 BC—Death of Viscount Cheng of Zhao
- 621 BC—Death of Duke Mu of Qin, China.
- 621 BC—Death of Duke Xiang of Jin, ruler of Jin (state)
- 621 BC—Death of Zhan Huo, Chinese governor
- Duke Xiang of Jin, ruler of Jin (state)
- Zhan Huo, Chinese governor
- c. 620 BC—Birth of Alcaeus of Mytilene, Greek lyric poet from Lesbos Island
- c. 620 BC—Birth of Aesop
