= Hu Yan =

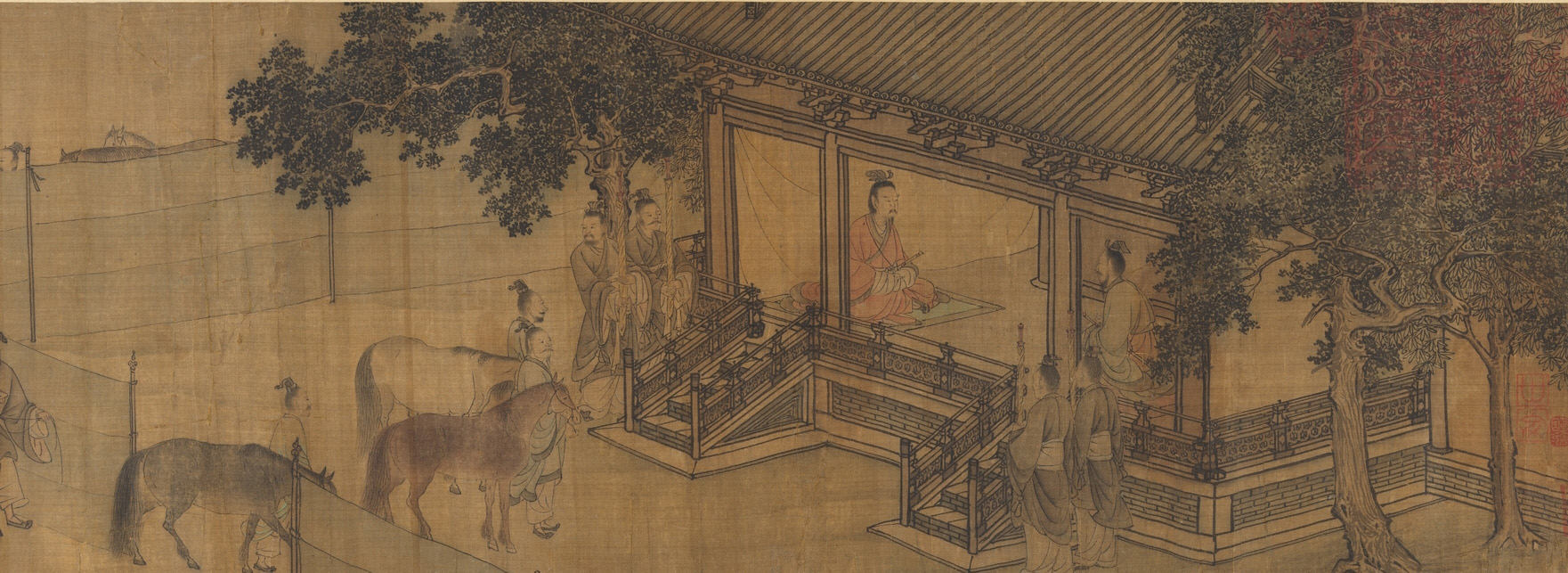
- The Wen Duke recovering Jin, attributed to Li Tang (AD 1140)
- Chinese: 狐偃
Transcriptions
Standard Mandarin
- Hanyu Pinyin: Hú Yǎn
- Wade–Giles: Hu Yen

Courtesy name
- Chinese: 子犯
- Literal meaning: Master Fan; Viscount Fan
Transcriptions
Standard Mandarin
- Hanyu Pinyin: Zǐfàn
- Wade–Giles: Tzu-fan

Other names
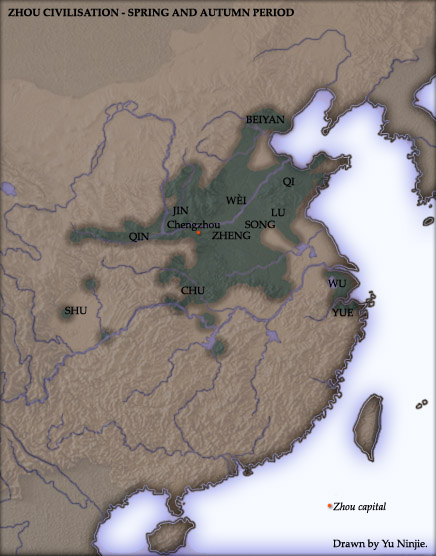
- The major states of Zhou China during its Spring and Autumn period

Jiu Ji
- Chinese: 臼季 咎季
Transcriptions
Standard Mandarin
- Hanyu Pinyin: Jiù Jì
- Wade–Giles: Chiu Chi

Jiu Fan
- Chinese: 舅犯 咎犯
- Literal meaning: Uncle Fan
Transcriptions
Standard Mandarin
- Hanyu Pinyin: Jiù Fàn
- Wade–Giles: Chiu Fan

Sikong Jizi
- Chinese: 司空季子
- Literal meaning: Jizi, the Minister of Works
Transcriptions
Standard Mandarin
- Hanyu Pinyin: Sīkōng Jìzǐ
- Wade–Giles: Ssu-k‘ung Chi-tzu

Hu Yan (715–629 BC) was a Di tribesman who served as a minister and general of Jin during the Spring and Autumn period of Chinese history. Hu Yan assisted Prince Chong'er (posthumously the "Wen Duke") during his long exile, his usurpation of his nephew Yu, and his rise to hegemonic status over the other states of the Zhou Kingdom. The Legalist Han Fei considered Hu Yan one of the best advisors of ancient China, and the historian Sima Qian listed him with Sun Tzu as the greatest tacticians of the age.

== Names ==
Hu Yan is a Chinese name: Hu is the surname and Yan is the given name. His courtesy name was Zifan (Note: In addition to the forms given above, Zifan and Jiu Fan also appear as Tse-fan and Kieou-fan in older sources following Chavannes. Giles reads 咎犯 as Kao or Gao Fan.) ("Master" or "Viscount Fan"). Classical sources also refer to him as Jiu Ji and Jiu Fan ("Uncle Fan"), in reference to his relationship to Chong'er through his mother's line. He is also sometimes known as Sikong Jizi ("Minister of Works").

== Life ==
Hu Yan was born in 715 BC into the leadership of one of the "barbarian" Di tribes who lived north of China during the Zhou. His father was Hu Tu (zh:狐突), his brother Hu Mao (zh:狐毛), and his sister Hu Ji (狐姬). The family was closely tied to the branch of the House of Ji who ruled Jin in present-day Shanxi. Some sources even make the Hu descendants of Shu Yu and thus distant cousins of the dukes of Jin and the kings of Zhou. Hu Tu served as the charioteer for the Jin prince Shensheng against the Red Di tribes of Gaoluo (皋落). Hu Ji became one of the wives of Jin's Duke Guizhu (posthumously, the "Xian Duke"). When the machinations of the concubine Li Ji led to the ritual suicide of Shensheng in 656 BC, Hu Tu retired from public service and ceased to leave his home. Hu Ji's son Chong'er replaced him as crown prince. Hu Yan was counted among his 5 Worthies (zh:五賢). When Li Ji successfully framed him for an attempted rebellion, he was compelled to flee from his seat in Pu to his mother's tribe in the north. Hu Yan either fled with him from his court at Pu or joined his retinue among the Di.

After the Jin minister Li Ke (zh:里克) had Li Ji, her son, and her nephew killed in 651 BC, he offered the throne to Chong'er but was declined. Another of Chong'er's younger half-brothers, Yiwu (posthumously, the "Hui Duke"), then took his place. Yiwu was captured in battle by Duke Renhao of Qin (posthumously, the "Mu Duke"); upon his liberation and return to Jin, he found that many of his ministers supported his replacement by his half-brother Chong'er. Yiwu then sent assassins against him in 644 BC, causing Chong'er and his followers to flee the Di (Note: The commentary on Confucius's Spring and Autumn Annals traditionally credited to Zuo Qiuming states that Chong'er and his followers were among the Di for 12 years.) and wander among the courts of China. The Discourses of the States records that it was Hu Yan who convinced Chong'er that it was necessary to leave. Hu Yan, Hu Mao, Xian Zhen (zh:先軫), (Note: Other sources state that Hu Mao and Xian Zhen formed part of the court of Duke Yu (posthumously, the "Huai Duke"), the son and successor of Chong'er's brother Duke Yiwu. When Chong'er and his followers invaded Jin with a Qin army, Hu and Xian refused to obey orders to oppose them. Hu Yan then recommended his brother to Chong'er, who appointed him general of his Upper Army.) Jie Zhitui, Zhao Cui, Wei Chou (zh:魏犨), and Jia Tuo (zh:賈佗) were among those who traveled with him from the Di to Qi.

In Qi, Duke Xiaobai (posthumously the "Huan Duke") treated Chong'er with such generosity that he did not wish to leave at all. Hu Yan conspired under a mulberry tree with some of the other Jin exiles, planning to abduct the prince and force him to concern himself with matters of state. The prince's wife Qi Jiang killed the young silk worker who overheard them and reported to her; although she told her husband of his advisors' plans, she advised him to permit his own abduction, as it was for the best. He refused, saying that he chose to end his days idling in Qi. Qi Jiang then joined the conspirators and, getting him drunk, helped Hu in carrying him off. When Chong'er recovered, he seized a spear and threatened Hu, crying, "If we succeed, fine! but if we don't, then I will eat your flesh as if I can never get my fill!"

The party then passed to Cao, Song, Zheng, and Chu, passing through other states as they went. After its duke disrespected Chong'er while he was passing through Wey, the prince was ready to beat a peasant who offered him a clod of dirt instead of food. Hu Yan supposedly intervened, kowtowed to the peasant, and loaded the dirt into his wagon, taking it as a portent that Jin would later take the peasant's territory Wulu (五鹿).

Chong'er, Hu Yan, and the others were invited to Qin after Yiwu's death. There, Duke Renhao supported their overthrow of Yiwu's son Yu (posthumously, the "Huai Duke"). During Yu's brief period of rule in 637 BC, he attempted to force Hu Tu to compel his sons to return to Jin and cease supporting the cause of Chong'er. When Hu Tu refused, he was executed.

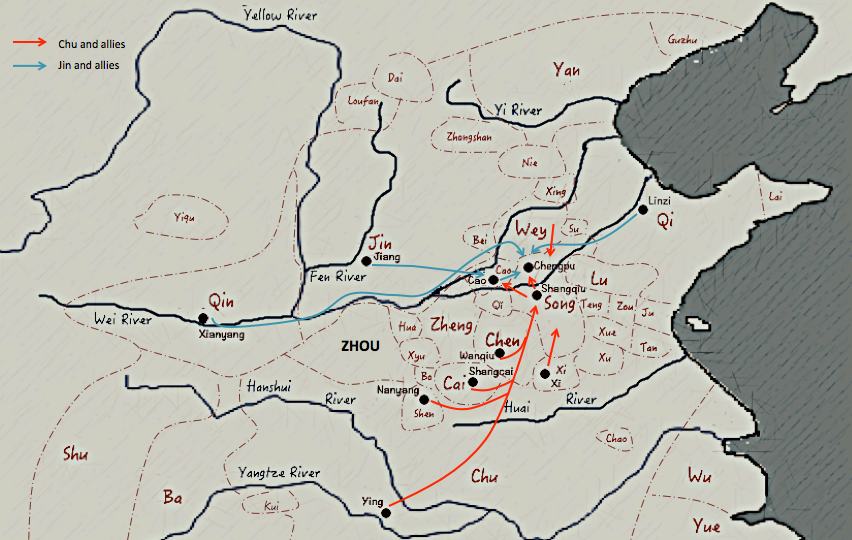
A map of the armies at the 632 BC Battle of Chengpu, including some of the minor states of the era

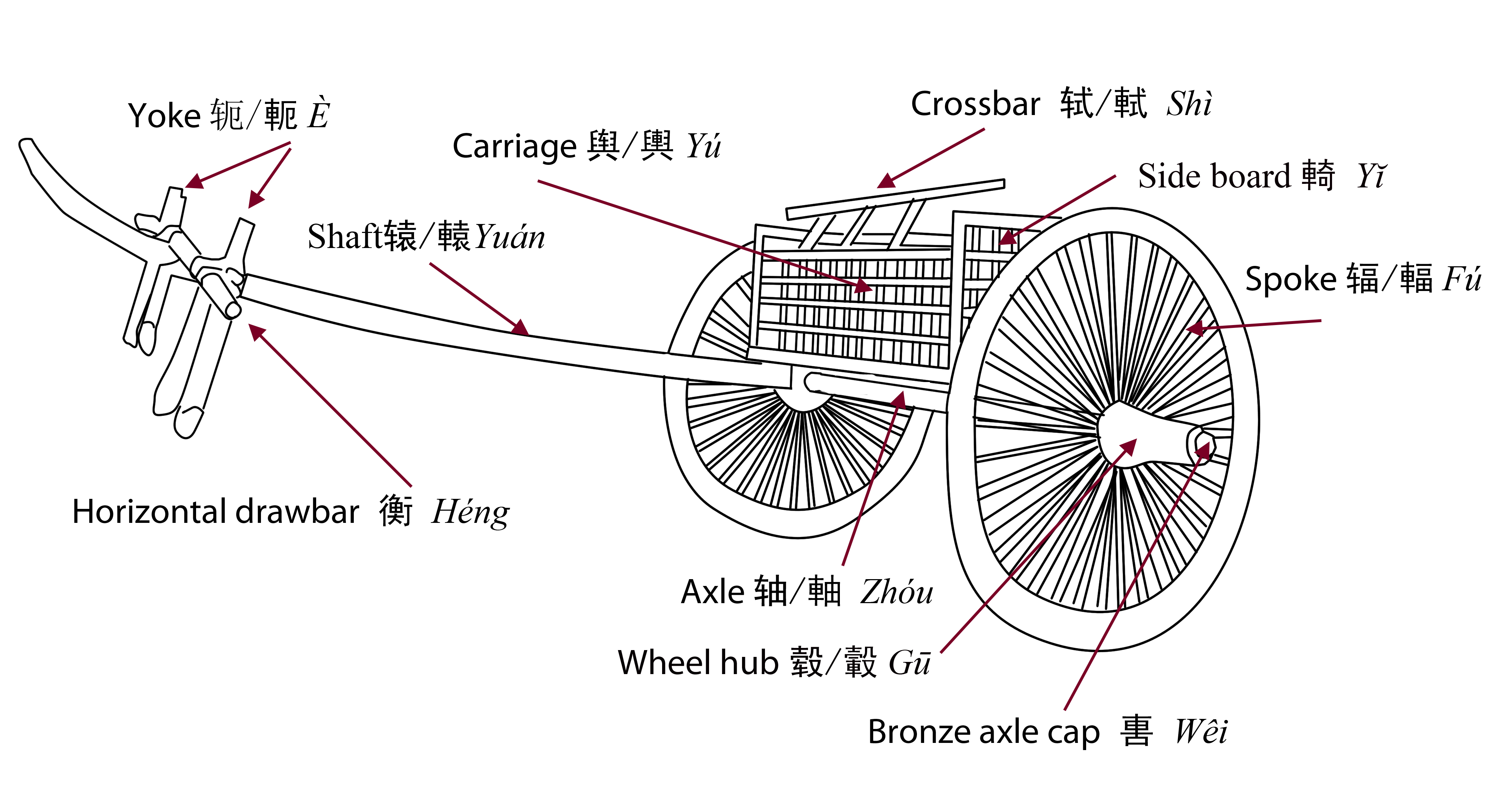
A Chinese chariot

When the Qin army reached the border of Jin, Hu Yan made a great show of humility. He apologized for his many faults while in Chong'er's service (Note: Hu Yan's supposed mistakes are not specified in the Zuozhuan or by Sima Qian. Han Fei has Hu Yan apologize to his prince for the many lies that he had been forced to tell during their travels, but as part of a remonstrance against the prince's attempt to hide the poor equipment and ragged servants of his travels from his new subjects.) and, offering him a jade disk, tendered his resignation. Poised to be the next duke of Jin, Chong'er threw the disk into the Yellow River and called upon it to witness that he would not forget those who had followed him in adversity. (Note: Han Fei has him untie the left horse from his chariot and swear by the river that he will countermand his order to hide his loyal but bedraggled followers from public view.) Jie Zhitui was so disgusted by what he took to be presumption and insincerity on both sides that he withdrew silently from Chong'er's service.

Hu Yan served Chong'er as a general in the Jin army. In 635 BC, he led men from Jin in assisting the restoration of King Zheng (posthumously the "Xiang King") against the usurper Shu Dai (zh:叔帶). In 633 BC, he served as the assistant commander of the Central Army (中軍佐). (Note: Other sources make him the lead general of the Upper Army (上軍), with his brother Hu Mao as his lieutenant.) The next year, he was one of the leaders of the Jin contingent that secured a major victory over Chu at Chengpu, somewhere in southern Henan or Shandong. Hu Yan was strongly supportive of the Jin position prior to the battle and even interpreted the Duke of Jin's dream—in which the Duke of Chu bent him over and began sucking out his brains—as a favorable omen. A passage in the Han Feizi credits Hu Yan with the successful tactics used by the coalition against Chu at Chengpu, but states that Chong'er subsequently rewarded Yong Ji instead because his advice had been to avoid deception and—while that had been less useful during wartime—it became better once peace was secured. Confucius praised this behavior, but Han Fei considered it textbook misadministration. He goes so far as listing Hu Yan as the most capable and important of Duke Chong'er's men and one of the prime "Assistants to Hegemonic Rulers" in ancient China. Han Fei says such assistants worked hard without concern for their health, rising early and retiring late, thinking cautiously but speaking frankly, holding their lord and state ahead of their own families and careers, and advising well but behaving humbly. He concludes, "Ministers like these, even under stupid and outrageous masters, could still achieve meritorious service. How much more could they do under brilliant sovereigns?"

In 630 BC, Hu Yan was one of the Jin representatives to the conference at Diquan (狄泉), near present-day Luoyang in Henan, where Prince Hu (虎) tried to create a general alliance of the Zhou Kingdom's vassal states of Lu, Song, Qi, Chen, Qin, Cai, and Jin.

He died in 629 BC. His son was Hu Shegu (zh:狐射姑, Hú Shègū).

== Legacy ==
Centuries later, Han Fei still considered the incident between Chong'er and Hu Yan in Qi as a classic example of how rulers sometimes depend on their followers and advisors for their success. Sima Qian placed Hu Yan beside Sun Tzu in a list of "famous soldiers" who "developed and threw new light on the principles of war", although no treatise in his name similar to the Art of War survives from antiquity. A passage in the Han Feizi suggests that Hu Yan was credited in antiquity with legitimizing and popularizing the use of deception in Chinese warfare. By offending Jie Zhitui into early retirement, Hu Yan may also be considered indirectly responsible for China's Cold Food and Tomb-Sweeping Festivals.

Hu Yan was portrayed by Zhang Rihui (张日辉) in the 1996 TV documentary Later Years of the Zhou Dynasty: Spring and Autumn Period (zh:东周列国春秋篇) and by You Liping (由立平) in the 2011 TV drama Song of Spring and Autumn.
