= Jie Zhitui =

7th century BC Chinese Jin aristocrat

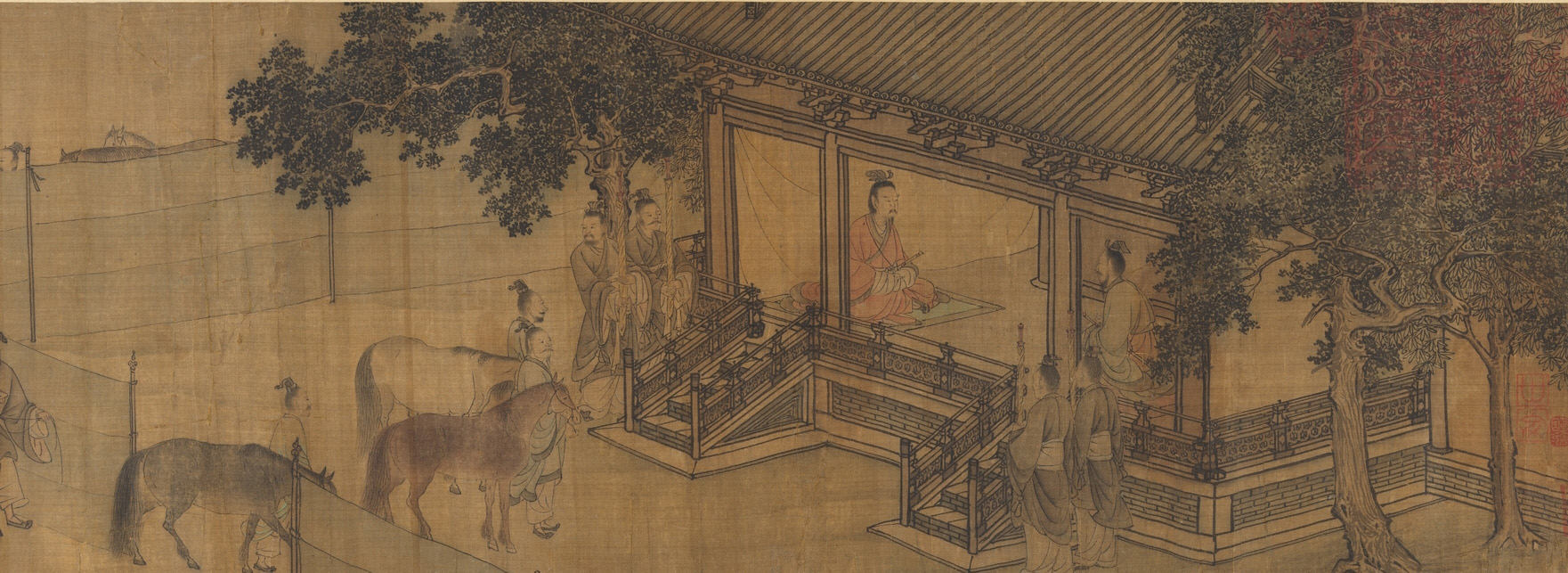
- The Wen Duke recovering Jin, attributed to Li Tang (AD 1140)
- Chinese: 介之推
Transcriptions
Standard Mandarin
- Hanyu Pinyin: Jiè Zhītuī
- Wade–Giles: Chieh Chih-t‘ui
- IPA: [tɕjê ʈʂí.tʰwéɪ]

Alternative names

Jie Zitui
- Chinese: 介子推
Transcriptions
Standard Mandarin
- Hanyu Pinyin: Jiè Zǐtuī
- Wade–Giles: Chieh Tzu-t‘ui
- IPA: [tɕjê tsì.tʰwéɪ]

Jiezi
- Chinese: 介子
- Literal meaning: Master Jie; Viscount Jie
Transcriptions
Standard Mandarin
- Hanyu Pinyin: Jièzǐ
- Wade–Giles: Chieh-tzu
- IPA: [tɕjê.tsì]

Jie Tui
- Chinese: 介推
Transcriptions
Standard Mandarin
- Hanyu Pinyin: Jiè Tuī
- Wade–Giles: Chieh T‘ui
- IPA: [tɕjê tʰwéɪ]

Wang Guang
- Chinese: 王光
Transcriptions
Standard Mandarin
- Hanyu Pinyin: Wáng Guāng
- Wade–Giles: Wang Kuang
- IPA: [wǎŋ kwáŋ]

Jie Zhitui (fl. 7th century BC), also known as Jie Zitui, was an ancient aristocrat who served the Jin prince Chong'er during the Spring and Autumn period of Chinese history. Chinese legend holds that when Chong'er finally ascended to power as the duke of Jin ("Duke Wen"), Jie either refused or was passed over for any reward, despite his great loyalty during the prince's times of hardship. Jie then retired to the forests of Jin in what is now central Shanxi with his mother. Supposedly, the duke so desired to repay Jie's years of loyalty that, when Jie declined to present himself at court, he ordered a forest fire to compel the recluse out of hiding. Instead, Jie and his mother were killed by the fire on Mt Mian. By the Han, Jie was being revered in central Shanxi as a Taoist immortal. He was annually commemorated with a ritual avoidance of fire that, despite many official bans, eventually became China's Cold Food and Qingming Festivals.

== Names ==
Jie Zhitui (Note: In addition to the forms given above, Jie Zhitui's name also appears as Këae Che-ts‘uy in older sources using Legge romanization and, for Jiezi Tui, as Kie-tse Tch'oei in sources following Chavannes.) or Jiezhi Tui is the name given to him in the oldest surviving records, with Jie Zitui or Jiezi Tui coming later. Sima Qian treats his name as though it were actually Jie Tui, with "Jiezi" serving as an honorific equivalent to "Master" or "Viscount Jie". A single 2nd-century source has "Jiezi Sui" (simplified Chinese: 介子绥; traditional Chinese: 介子綏; pinyin: Jièzǐ Suí). Others state that the entire name Jiezi Tui was a posthumous title and that his real name had been Wang Guang.

== Life ==
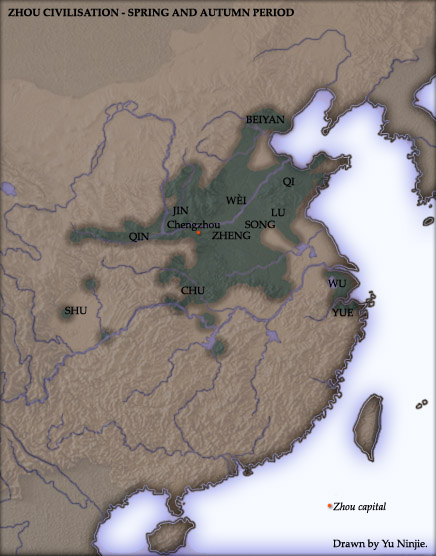
The major states of Zhou China during its Spring and Autumn period

Jie was a Jin aristocrat, poet, and composer for the Chinese zither during the Spring and Autumn period of China's Zhou dynasty. He served at the court of the Jin prince Chong'er (posthumously the "Wen Duke") in Pu during the reign of Chong'er's father Duke Guizhu (posthumously the "Xian Duke"). A passage of the Huainanzi relates that, when Master Jie sang "The Dragon and the Snake", Prince Chong'er "broke down in tears". Giles considered Jie to be the same person as the "Jiezi Tui" who is mentioned as having been a minister in Chu at the age of 15.

In 655 BC, Jie followed Chong'er into exile among the Di tribes north of the Chinese when the Rong beauty Li Ji successfully plotted against the sons of the other wives of the Duke of Jin. Her son Xiqi and his successor Zhuozi were quickly killed by the minister Li Ke, who then offered the throne to Chong'er in 651 BC. The prince declined; his younger brother Yiwu (posthumously the "Hui Duke") accepted and then—after a perilous period of imprisonment in Qin—sent assassins after Chong'er in 646 BC. Hearing about them, he and his court fled from the Di, arriving at the state of Qi in Shandong in 644 BC. Soon after, Qi fell into a civil war over its own succession. Prince Chong'er and his growing entourage then travelled to the courts of Cao, Song, Zheng, Chu, and finally Qin. In 636 BC, Duke Renhao (posthumously the "Mu Duke") lent Qin's army for an invasion against Duke Yiwu's son Yu (posthumously the "Huai Duke"), defeating him at Gaoliang.

Jie was passed over for reward when Chong'er became duke of Jin. The 4th-century-BC commentary on the Spring and Autumn Annals credited to Zuo Qiuming contains the earliest surviving record of Jie's story, in a section now placed beside Confucius's entry on Duke Yiwu's death in 637 BC. In it, a Thucydidean dialogue between Jie and his mother explains how he finds the duke's other retainers to be thieves for taking credit and receiving rewards when Heaven itself was responsible for Chong'er's restoration. His lord also showed himself to be unworthy by failing to reward him despite his failure to appear at court. His mother asks him to at least go before the duke, but he explains he has already criticized the other nobles so harshly that he could not possibly return and is resolved to withdraw into the wilderness. She accepts his decision and leaves with him. When the duke later realized his mistake, he sought out Jie but failed. He then set aside the produce of the fields of Mianshang to endow sacrifices in Jie's honor, "a memento ... of my neglect and a mark of distinction for the good man".

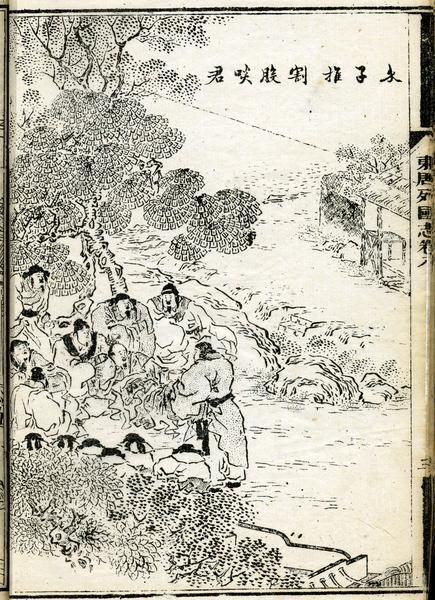
During the exile of Gongzi Chong'er, Jie Zhitui with made soup from flesh carved from his own body to feed his master (illustration from the Chronicles of the Eastern Zhou Kingdoms).

The annals compiled c. 239 BC under Qin's chancellor Lü Buwei opine that Duke Chong'er never became a king because he proved less capable in success than he had been in adversity. Its account of Jie's fate—which omits mention of his mother—begins with the moral that "it is easy to hold onto others if you offer them honor and wealth[, b]ut it is difficult ... if you offer them poverty and debasement". Lü's scholars do not suggest that the duke overlooked Jie, however, but that he was simply "far from the vulgar crowd" and embarrassed by the behavior the duke's other close retainers. He posts a poem upon the palace gates, (Note: Knoblock & al. translate it as: A dragon went flying, Circling all the world. Five serpents accompanied him, Serving as aides and helpers. When the dragon returned to his home, And won his proper place, Four of the serpents accompanied him And won their dew and rain. But one serpent was ashamed of this And withered to death in the open fields.) obliquely announcing his retirement into the mountains. Chong'er hears of it, recognizes its author, and goes into mourning for his old friend, changing his clothes and sleeping away from the palace. He offers a million "fields" of land and a position as senior minister (上卿; 'shǎngqīng') to anyone—noble or common—who is able to find Jie for him. The only person who does discover Jie, however, finds him carrying a pot and a large umbrella in the remote mountains. Asked if he knows where Jie Zhitui might live, the hermit replies that Jie "does not wish to be discovered" and "wants to remain hidden". Complaining "How is it that I alone know this?" he wandered away beneath his umbrella, never to be seen again.

The account in Sima Qian's 1st-century BC Records largely repeats the Zuozhuan account with greater detail. (In fact, the four-character lines and rhyming dialogue in Jie's conversations with his mother suggests it draws on an earlier, now-lost poetic treatment of the life of Chong'er.) Sima specifies that Jie hid himself out of disgust at what he took as Hu Yan's insincere and overdramatic retirement on the journey from Qin to Jin, which Chong'er declined with similar overstatement. Sima interrupts Jie's story, though, to make excuses for the duke's tardiness in remembering and rewarding Jie. The beginning of Chong'er's reign was distracted by rioting caused by Duke Yu's partisans Yin Yi and Xi Rui, who even succeeded in burning down the ducal palace before being captured and put to death with Duke Renhao's assistance. When Jie is brought back to Chong'er's attention by the poem on the gates of the new palace, (Note: Nienhauser & al. translate it as: The dragon wanted to ascent to Heaven, [and] Five snakes acted to support him. Once the dragon had risen to the clouds Four of the snakes each entered their own dwelling places. Only one snake harbored resentment and To the end one never saw where he lived.) it has been placed there not by Jie himself but by his own loyal friends. Chong'er sees it himself and again immediately understands that it is about Jie. Jie and his mother are never seen again, but Chong'er—doing what he can—"surrounded and sealed off" the "heart" of Mianshang in order to make it Jie's and "in order to record [his] error and also to commend an excellent man".

== Legend ==
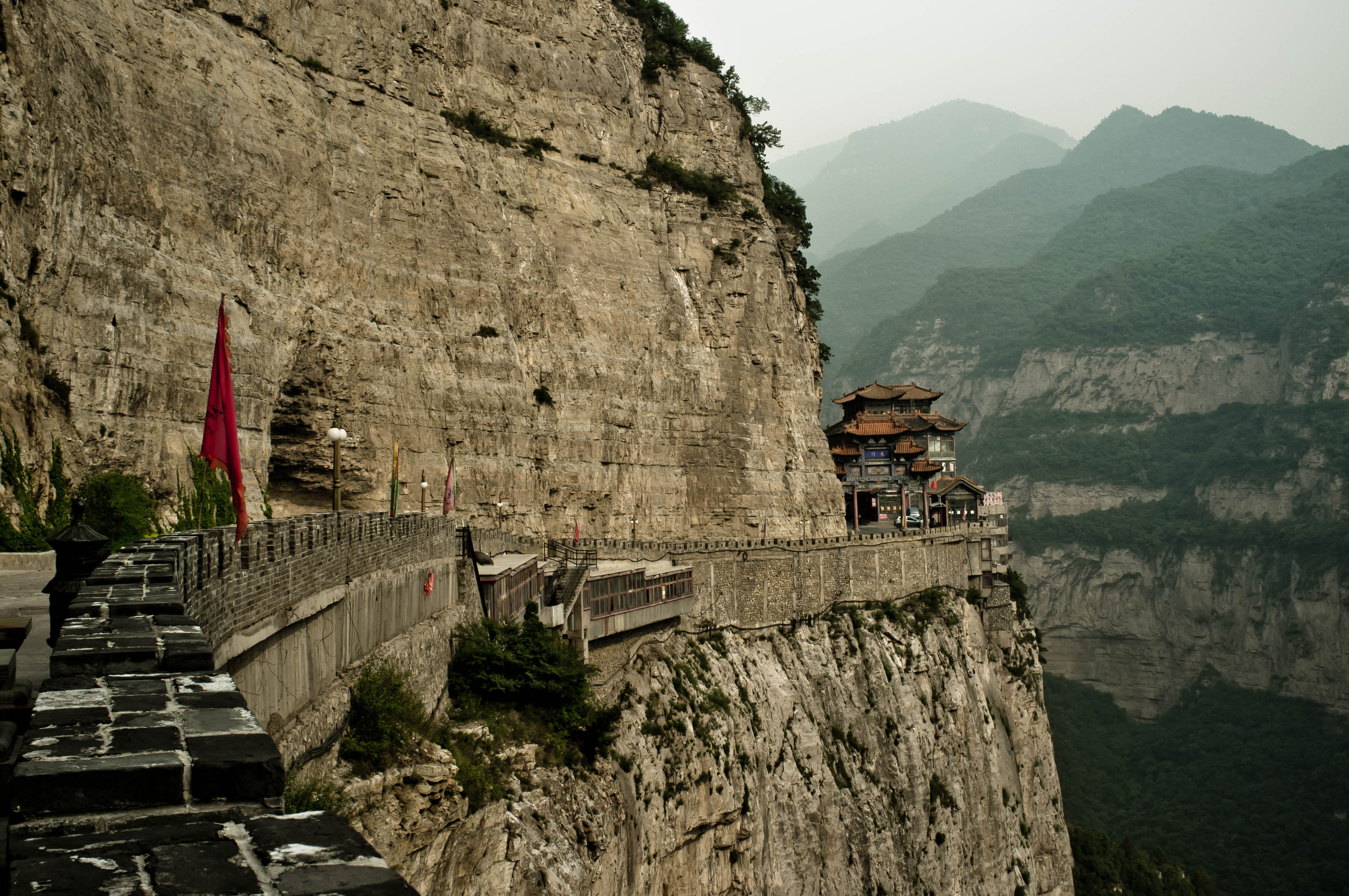
Mt Mian in Jinzhong Prefecture in central Shanxi

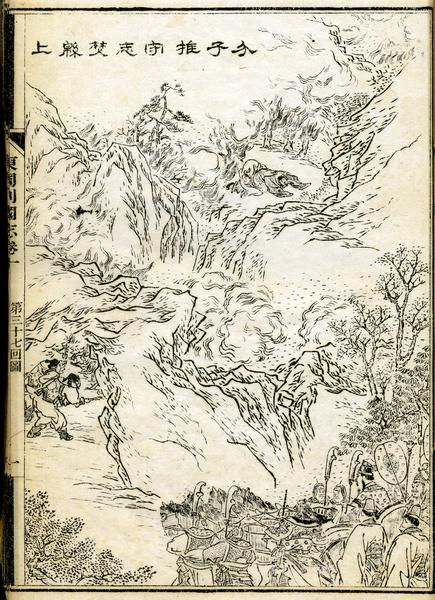
Duke Wen of Jin lid a forest fire on one side of Mt Mian to drive out Jie Zhitui (illustration from the Chronicles of the Eastern Zhou Kingdoms).

By the 3rd century BC, Jie Zhitui's story had received additional embellishment. Han Fei's collected works reference the story—dramatizing Jie's selflessness and loyalty—whereby he fed Chong'er with soup made from flesh carved from his own body because he was unable to bear his lord's thirst or hunger. Zhuang Zhou's collected works specify that the meat came from his thigh and that he "was burned to death with a tree in his arms". The Songs of Chu written and compiled between the 3rd century BC and the 2nd century AD reference Jie repeatedly as a loyal and wronged vassal, mentioning the story about his flesh, treating his former haunts as shrines for honest officials, and adding the details that Chong'er found Jie's body and donned mourning robes for him. (Note: Liu Xiang, the 1st-century BC author of the Songs of Chu’s "Nine Laments", references the original story of Jie disappearing into the forest, rather than his death in a fire. At one point, Hawkes's translation suggests that Jie starved to death. but a subsequent note in its Penguin reprint clarifies that the text does not intend that.)

Modern forms of the story invariably include the story of Jie cooking a stew using flesh from his own thigh and wild herbs, usually specifying that Chong'er was on the verge of starvation at the time. Some elaborate on the duke's generosity to all his other supporters: one source includes proclamations that "awards may be divided into three grades: the first-grade award goes to those [who] followed me into exile; the second-grade award goes to those who donated money; and the third grade goes to those who welcomed the return of my dukedom" and that even "those who have supported me in other ways but not yet been rewarded may report their names for awards". Nonetheless, Jie retired to Mt Mian, carrying his mother. When the duke was unable to find his old friend's hermitage amid the endless trees and ridges, his advisors suggested lighting a forest fire on one side of Mt Mian to drive him out since his duty to his mother would overcome his pride. However, the fire raged three days and nights and Jie was burnt to death under a willow together with his mother. Some add the detail that he left verses written in blood, "I cut off my own flesh to dedicate [it] to you, [and] only wish [that] my king will always be clear and bright." Duke Chong'er then erected a temple in his honor and personally ordered the Cold Food Festival.

== Works ==
Jie is listed as the author of several poems or songs, although since they were composed in a dialect of Old Chinese their lines do not necessarily rhyme or scan correctly in present-day Mandarin. The lyrics of "The Dragon and Snake Song" (simplified Chinese: 龙蛇歌; traditional Chinese: 龍蛇歌; pinyin: Lóngshégē) or "The Song of the Dragon and the Snake" (simplified Chinese: 龙蛇之歌; traditional Chinese: 龍蛇之歌; pinyin: Lóngshé zhī Gē) are included in the Qin Melodies. They tell the story of a beautiful dragon stripped of its horns, scales, and flight owing to the jealousy of Heaven. On Earth, it becomes close friends with a snake before eventually returning to its proper station. The snake understands the two come from different worlds but remains forlorn, and the song—set for the Chinese zither—ends with the moral that, "to be cheerful, one cannot look back." (Note: Its lyrics are reported as: 有龍矯矯，遭天譴怒。 卷排角甲，來遯於下。 志願不與，蛇得同伍， 龍蛇俱行，身辨山墅。 龍得升天，安厥房戶， 蛇獨抑摧，沈滯泥土。 仰天怨望，綢繆悲苦， 非樂龍伍，惔不眄顧。) He was also credited with "The Scholar who Lost His Ambition" (士失志操; Shì Shī Zhì Cāo).

== Legacy ==
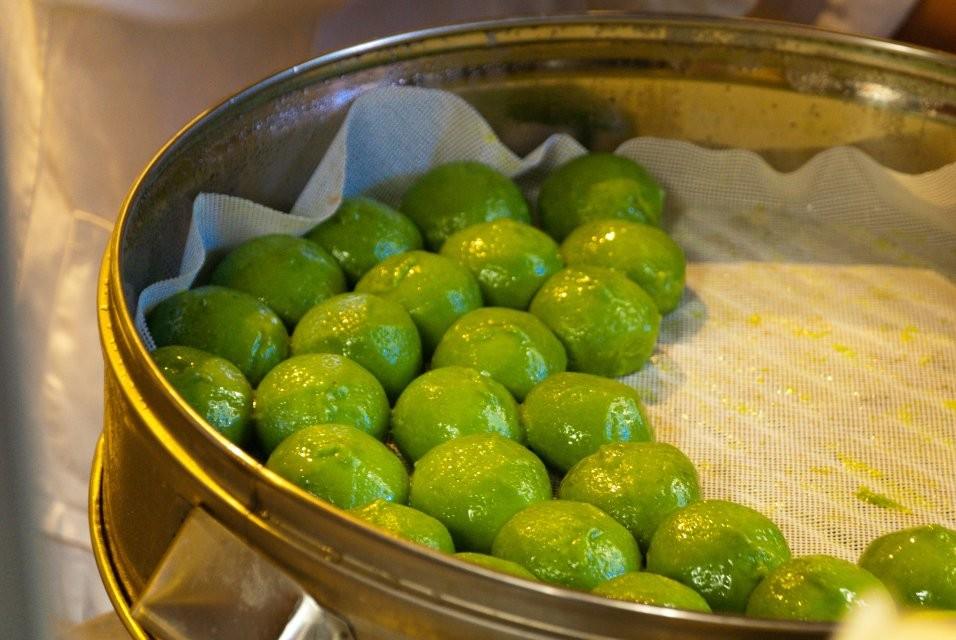
Qingtuan, one of the "cold foods" still eaten for the Tomb-Sweeping Festival around the Qingming solar term.

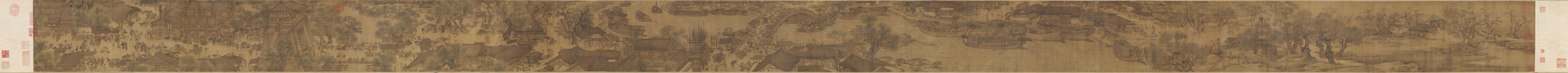
Zhang Zeduan's 12th-century Along the River at Qingming, one of the most famous Chinese paintings, showing the people of the Northern Song during the Cold Food Festival. (Click to enlarge.)

The oldest sources for Jie's story state that Duke Chong'er set apart the income from the fields of Mianshang near Jiexiu to endow sacrifices in his honor. By the Eastern Han (1st & 2nd centuries), he was listed among the Taoist immortals and had a temple in Taiyuan and another at Mt Mian at his tomb on Lord Jie Ridge. The mountain temple supposedly also preserved various relics of Jie's, brought there by Chong'er. A grove of blackened trees on the mountain was also revered and, in the 6th century, supposed to be a place of miracles granted by the sage.

During the Eastern Han, people in central and southern Shanxi avoided fire for up to a month in the middle of winter, either out of respect for Jie or because they feared his spirit's vengeance against those who broke the taboo. This left them unable to cook their staple grains like rice and millet or most other forms of Chinese food. At first, the most common dish was a cold form of uncooked congee or gruel; later, a menu developed of items that were precooked but kept long enough that they could be eaten unheated during the festival.

From the 2nd to the 5th century, Zhou Ju (simplified Chinese: 周举; traditional Chinese: 周舉; pinyin: Zhōu Jǔ), Cao Cao, Shi Le, and Tuoba or Yuan Hong all attempted to ban this Cold Food Festival because of the suffering that it caused children and the elderly. All failed, in Shi Le's case because a massive hailstorm across all of Shanxi the year after his ban required that he adjust the policy. At some point before the end of the 3rd century, however, the pronouncements of Zhou Ju and other officials did succeed in moving the festival from the middle of winter to 105 days later, around the Qingming solar term near the end of spring (by Chinese reckoning). The Cold Food Festival spread throughout China by the 6th century but, after the incorporation of ancestral veneration and other aspects of the Double Third Festival under the Tang, the prohibition against fire and remembrance of Jie slowly diminished in importance as it became the modern Tomb-Sweeping Festival by the Qing. Today, as was true long in the past, observance of the fire taboo is mostly limited to the countryside around Jiexiu and Mt Mian in Shanxi, where there is still a small temple in his honor, the Pavilion of the Divine Jie (simplified Chinese: 介神阁; traditional Chinese: 介神閣; pinyin: Jièshéngé). Some people hang willow beside their doors. Downtown Jiexiu also holds themed events and temple fairs during the old Cold Food Festival and some cold foods like qingtuan continue to be popular as seasonal staples.

Jie is usually considered the namesake of the town of Jiexiu (lit. 'Jie's Rest'), which was renamed from Pingchang under the Tang about AD 618 to reflect the name its surrounding commandery—including Mt Mian—had borne since the Northern Wei (4th–6th century).

His legend—with adjustments—appears in Wang Mengji's 17th-century short story "Jie Zhitui Sets Fire to His Jealous Wife", which uses irony and absurdities to comment on feminine jealousy and the difficulty of matching results to intentions. The first contemporary dance troupe on Taiwan, the Cloud Gate Dance Theater, has dramatized the story of Jie Zhitui as Han Shih since 1974. Jie is depicted in "a white robe with a long, broad trail ... as the hero[,] dragging the weight of his principle, struggles to his self-redemption". He Bing portrayed "Jie Zitui" as the main character of the 2011 TV drama Song of Spring and Autumn.

Jie's intransigence has not always escaped criticism. The Legalist philosopher Han Fei listed him among the absurd advisors who "were all like hard gourds". Holzman acknowledges that Jie's behavior "earned him immortality as a loyal official who chose obscure retirement rather than sacrifice his principles", but still personally finds it "rather strange... and rather petulant". A 2015 article in the Shanghai Daily admits that, "judged in light of modern notion[s]", Jie "would probably be suffering from personality disorders that lead to him to perceive and understand the world in ways that are 'inflexible'". Being "one of the most celebrated models of integrity of the old school", however, Jie is not faulted for his actions but listed as "a mentally sound person who live[d] in an 'unhealthy society'" and did not "fit" it.

== See also ==
- Qu Yuan and Wu Zixu, two other ancient Chinese courtiers whose deaths supposedly inspired Chinese holidays
