= Biographies of Exemplary Women =

18 BCE book

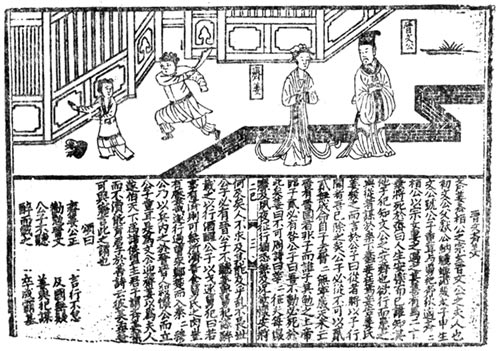
- An 11th-century woodblock print of the book
- Author: Liu Xiang
- Original title: 列女傳
- Language: Classical Chinese
- Genre: Biography
- Publication date: c. 18 BCE
- Publication place: Han China
- Dewey Decimal: 920.051
- LC Class: PG3366.S6
- Original text: 列女傳 at Chinese Wikisource

Biographies of Exemplary Women
- Traditional Chinese: 列女傳
- Simplified Chinese: 列女传
- Literal meaning: arrayed biographies of women
Transcriptions
Standard Mandarin
- Hanyu Pinyin: Liènǚ Zhuàn
- Wade–Giles: Lieh^{4} nü^{3} chʻuan^{2}
Middle Chinese
- Middle Chinese: /liᴇt̚ ɳɨʌ^{X} ɖˠiuᴇn/
Old Chinese
- Zhengzhang: /*red naʔ don/

The Biographies of Exemplary Women (Chinese: 列女傳) is a book compiled by the Han dynasty scholar Liu Xiang c. 18 BCE. It includes 125 biographical accounts of exemplary women in ancient China, taken from early Chinese histories including Chunqiu, Zuozhuan, and the Records of the Grand Historian. The book served as a standard Confucianist textbook for the moral education of women in traditional China for two millennia.

== Description ==
The idealized biographies are divided into eight scrolls, including the eighth addendum from an unknown editor, as shown below.

Chapter	Chinese	Translation
1	母儀傳; mǔ yí zhuàn	Matronly Models
2	賢明傳; xián míng zhuàn	The Worthy and Enlightened
3	仁智傳; rén zhì zhuàn	The Benevolent and Wise
4	貞順傳; zhēn shùn zhuàn	The Chaste and Obedient
5	節義傳; jié yì zhuàn	The Principled and Righteous
6	辯通傳; biàn tōng zhuàn	The Accomplished Speakers
7	孽嬖傳; niè bì zhuàn	Depraved Favorites
8	續列女傳; xù liè nǚ zhuàn	Supplemental Biographies

This book follows the lièzhuàn (列傳; "arrayed biographies") biographical format established by the Chinese historian Sima Qian. The word liènǚ (列女; "famous women in history") is sometimes understood as liènǚ (烈女; "women martyrs"), which Neo-Confucianists used to mean a "woman who commits suicide after her husband's death rather than remarry; [a] woman who dies defending her honor."

The online Chinese Text Initiative at the University of Virginia provides an e-text edition of the Lienü Zhuan, including both digitized Chinese content and images of a Song dynasty woodblock edition with illustrations by Gu Kaizhi (c. 344-405 CE) of the Jin dynasty.

== Notable Biographies ==
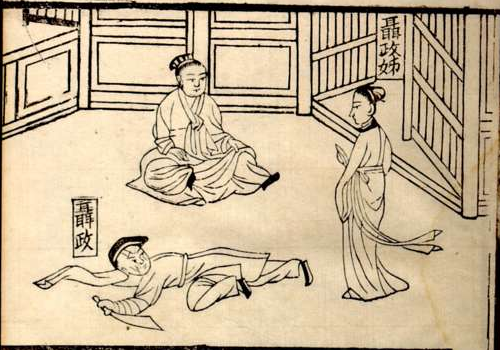
The female assassin

Chapter 1, Matronly Models (母儀傳; mǔ yí zhuàn):

- Ehuang and Nüying, daughters of Emperor Yao; both married his successor, Emperor Shun, providing him with invaluable political advice.
- Jiang Yuan, virgin mother of Hou Ji, and, through him, effectively the ancestor of the Zhou dynasty.
- Jiandi, consort of Emperor Ku, said to have become pregnant after swallowing a blackbird's egg.
- Lady Tushan, consort of Yu the Great; taught her son, the future-Emperor Qi, how to be a virtuous ruler.
- Bi Bing, consort of King Tang, founder of the Shang dynasty; said to have ensured there was order and respect among Tang's concubines, and that there was no jealousy or backbiting.
- Tai Si (12th-11th centuries BCE), along with Tai Jiang and Tao Ren, one of the three mothers of the Zhou dynasty; hailed by later dynasties as the ideal Imperial consort.
- Zhuang Jiang (died 690 BCE), daughter of Duke Zhuang of Qi; was admonished by her tutor over her improper conduct, after which she turned her life around.
- Meng Mu (4th century BCE), the mother of Mencius; a single mother who taught her son the importance of etiquette and learning despite living in poverty.

Chapter 2, The Worthy and Enlightened (賢明傳; xián míng zhuàn):

- Queen Jiang (died 782 BCE), wife of King Xuan of Zhou; her extreme display of humility persuaded Xuan to focus on affairs of state rather than his concubines.
- Lady Shao Wey (7th century BCE), concubine of King Huan of Qi; successfully pleaded for her home state of Wey to be spared from attack.
- Qi Jiang (7th century BCE), wife of Duke Wen of Jin; got Wen drunk after he refused to retake his home state, then took him there, forcing him to act.
- Duchess Mu of Qin (7th century BCE), wife of Duke Mu of Qin, whose tears and threat of self-immolation persuaded the Duke to spare her brother's life.
- Lady Fan (7th-6th centuries BCE), favorite consort of King Zhuang of Chu; persuaded the King to cut back on his passion for hunting by refusing to eat meat until he did so.
- Lady Zhao (7th century BCE), second wife of Zhao Cui, who convinced her husband to reconcile with his first wife and eldest son.
- Liuxia Hui's Wife (7th century BCE), insisted on performing her husband's funeral oration, as no one knew his deeds and merits better than her.

Chapter 3, The Benevolent and Wise (仁智傳; rén zhì zhuàn):

- Deng Man, wife of King Wu of Chu (8th century BCE), famous for a proverb stating that it is the way of Heaven for decline to follow prosperity.
- Duchess Mu of Xu (7th century BCE), reputedly China's first female poet, remembered for risking her position to get aid to her home state of Wey when it was attacked.
- Sunshu Ao's mother (7th century BCE), who praised her son for doing good deeds in secret, as it would bring him good fortune in the future.
- Zhao Kuo's wife (3rd century BCE), tried to persuade both her son and King Xiaocheng of Zhao that the former was the wrong choice to take command of the army; she was ignored, and the army was destroyed, along with her son.

Chapter 4, The Chaste and Obedient (貞順傳; zhēn shùn zhuàn):

- Lady Meng (7th century BCE), wife of King Xiao of Qi, renowned for her modesty and chastity; hanged herself rather than seemingly be disgraced in public.
- Lady Meng Jiang (3rd century BCE); her tears on hearing of her husband's death caused part of the Great Wall to collapse, revealing his bones.
- Bo Ying (6th century BCE), mother to King Zhao of Chu; fought her would-be rapist, King Helü of Wu, with a knife and lectured him on morality, causing him to retreat in shame.
- Zhen Jiang (6th century BCE), first wife of King Zhao of Chu, refused to be evacuated during a flood due to the messenger not having the King's command token (which she had pledged to obey above all), and so died before it could be retrieved.

Chapter 5, The Principled and Righteous (節義傳; jié yì zhuàn):

- Zheng Mao (7th century BCE), primary wife of King Cheng of Chu, advised her husband not to appoint his eldest son, Shangchen, as crown prince, then committed suicide as a warning when Cheng dismissed her fears as jealousy.
- Huai Ying (650-620 BCE), refused to escape with her husband out of loyalty to her father, then refused to tell her father of the escape plan out of loyalty to her husband.
- Lady Yue (5th century BCE), daughter of King Goujian of Yue, who successfully lectured her husband for choosing pleasure over affairs of state.

Chapter 6, The Accomplished Speakers (辯通傳; biàn tōng zhuàn):

- Lady Yue (4th century BCE), concubine of King Wei of Qi, successfully pleaded her case when accused of treason.
- Zhongli Chun (4th century BCE), made King Xuan of Qi aware of the "Four Daggers" threatening his kingdom, causing him to abandon licentiousness and luxury in favor of honest governing.
- Su Liu Nü (4th-3rd centuries BCE), literally "The Lump-necked Woman", who surprised King Min of Qi in not being ashamed of her appearance or her station, nor intimidated by the King himself.
- Zhuang's Niece (3rd century BCE), warned King Qingxiang of Chu that many calamities faced his kingdom if he didn't start leading by example.

Chapter 7, Depraved Favorites (孽嬖傳; niè bì zhuàn):

- Mo Xi (17th century BCE), concubine whose influence is said to have brought about the fall of the Xia dynasty.
- Daji (died 1046 BCE), had a love of torture and executions, going so far as to torture prisoners personally.
- Bao Si (died 771 BCE), her amusement at the lighting of warning beacons caused King You of Zhou to abuse their use, meaning that no one came when the emergency was real.
- Xuan Jiang (730-690 BCE), consort of Duke Xuan of Wey, arranged the murder of her stepson to ensure her own son's succession.
- Wen Jiang (died 673 BCE), had her husband murdered after he discovered her incestuous relationship with her half-brother.
- Ai Jiang (died 660 BCE), wife of Duke Zhuang of Lu, partly responsible for the murders of Zhuang's immediate successors.
- Lady Yi (died 651 BCE), concubine of Duke Xian of Jin, responsible for the Li Ji Unrest, in which the designated crown prince was framed for treason and forced to commit suicide.
- Mu Jiang (621-564 BCE), ruled on behalf of her husband and son, taking decisions related to war and diplomacy.
- Xia Ji (7th century BCE), allegedly had multiple marriages and affairs.
- Lady Nanzi (died 480 BCE), ruled the state of Wey in her own right, which led to a clash with Confucius.

Chapter 8, Supplementary Biographies (續列女傳; xù liè nǚ zhuàn), added later:

- Lady Xian (died 66 BCE), wife of the statesman Huo Guang; had Empress Xu Pingjun murdered so her own daughter would become empress instead.
- Consort Feng (died 6 BCE), favorite consort of Emperor Yuan of Han; forced to commit suicide by her rival, *Consort Fu, who had previously tortured a number of Feng's relatives to death.
- Consort Ban (48-2 BCE), concubine of Emperor Cheng of Han, renowned as a scholar and poet; was accused of witchcraft by the emperor's new favorite, Zhao Feiyan, yet managed to save her life through an impassioned speech.
- Empress Zhao Feiyan (c. 45–1 BCE), dancing girl who, along with her sister, Zhao Hede, became favorites of Emperor Cheng of Han; proclaimed empress in 16 BCE after she and Hede had removed all of their rivals.
- Empress Wang (8 BCE–23 CE), daughter of Wang Mang, last empress of the Western Han; remained loyal to the dynasty even after her father overthrew it, and refused all attempts by him to have her remarry.
- Lady Han (died c. 25 CE), consort of the Gengshi Emperor, whose fondness for drinking was held to have caused the emperor's downfall.
- Empress Ma (died 79 CE), wife of Emperor Ming of Han; a political advisor known for her modesty and frugality, as well as her refusal to engage in nepotism.

By the coauthor Huangfu Mi:

- Zhao E, noble of the state of Cao Wei during the Three Kingdoms period, decapitated her father's killer and turned herself in.
- Xiahou Lingnu, aristocrat of the state of Cao Wei during the Three Kingdoms period, refused to remarry after her husband's family were executed for treason.
- Wang Yi, wife of Zhao Ang.

== See also ==
- Historiography
- Chinese Historiography
- De Mulieribus Claris, parallel in Western literature
