= Li Ji Unrest =

Series of events in ancient China

- Traditional Chinese: 驪姬之亂
- Simplified Chinese: 骊姬之乱
- Literal meaning: Li Ji's Unrest
Transcriptions
Standard Mandarin
- Hanyu Pinyin: Lí Jī zhī luàn
- Wade–Giles: Li Chi chih Luan

The Li Ji Unrest or Rebellion (657–651 BCE) was a series of events that took place in the State of Jin during the Spring and Autumn period of ancient China, caused by Li Ji, the concubine of Duke Xian of Jin, in order to put her son Xiqi onto the throne of Jin.

== Background ==
Duke Xian of Jin married six wives who gave birth to five sons. The first was Jia Jun (賈君) from the State of Jia (賈國). Qi Jiang (齊姜) gave birth to Prince Shensheng. Hu Ji (狐姬) was the mother of Prince Chong'er while her younger sister Xiao Rongzi (小戎子) gave birth to Prince Yiwu. Li Ji was the mother of Xiqi while her dowry younger sister (Note: Following the custom at the time, Shao Ji, as the younger sister of Li Ji, also became the concubine of Duke Xian when the pair married.) Shao Ji (少姬) gave birth to Zhuozi.

== Duke Xian marries Li Ji ==
At the time Duke Xian considered taking his concubine Li Ji as his first wife. Before doing so he asked the gods through divination whether or not it was wise to do this. The answer he received was that the outcome would not be good. He asked a second time and on receiving a positive response he made Li Ji his main wife, replacing Qi Jiang.

== The unrest ==
In 665 BCE, the twelfth year of the reign of Duke Xian, Li Ji gave birth to Prince Xiqi. Since Li Ji wanted her son to be the crown prince, she bribed two of Duke Xian's most trusted officials, Liang Wu (梁五) and Dongguan Biwu (東關嬖五). The two officials persuaded Duke Xian to let Shensheng, Chong'er and Yiwu leave the capital, Jiang (絳). The officials told the duke that the northern Rong and Di tribes frequently attacked Jin such that the princes were needed to defend their territory. Duke Xian then sent Prince Shensheng to defend Quwo. Duke Xian also sent Chong'er to defend the city of Pu (within present-day Linfen Prefecture, Shanxi) and Yiwu to Erqu (二屈), modern Ji County in Shanxi.

In 656 BCE, Li Ji started her plot to frame Prince Shensheng. She told Shensheng that he should offer sacrifices to his deceased mother Qi Jiang while he was in Quwo. Moreover, Li Ji suggested that Shensheng bring back some of the sacrificial meat and wine and offer it to his father as tribute. Without the Prince’s knowledge, Li Ji secretly spiked the meat and wine with poison. Before eating the meat Shensheng had brought, Duke Xian gave a piece to his dog which immediately collapsed. Discovering the poison in the food, Duke Xian sent men to Quwo to arrest Shensheng and kill his teacher Du Yuankuan (杜原款). Upon hearing the news, Shensheng escaped to Quwo.

Shensheng was visited by his half-brother Chong'er in Quwo who then advised Shensheng to defend himself in front of Duke Xian by revealing Li Ji's plot. Shensheng replied that he wouldn't like to break his father's heart by revealing Li Ji's plot. When Chong'er advised him to escape, he replied that if he escaped, then it would look like he really planned to kill his father. He said that no one in the world would protect him then. Shensheng then hanged himself on the 7th day of the second month of 656 BCE.

Later generations admired the filial piety and loyalty of Prince Shensheng that they nicknamed him "Gong Taizi" (恭太子) or "Gong Shizi" (恭世子), both meaning "the respectful crown prince".

== Aftermath ==
After Prince Shensheng committed suicide, Li Ji falsely accused Chong'er and Yiwu of revolting, and the two princes escaped to Pu and Erqu, respectively. In 655 BCE, the 22nd year of his reign, Duke Xian sent troops to Pu and Erqu to capture Chong'er and Yiwu. Chong'er escaped to the Di tribe, where his mother came from, with some of his loyal subjects: Zhao Cui, Hu Yan (狐偃), Jia Tuo (賈佗), Xian Zhen (先軫), and Jie Zhitui.

In 655 BCE, Duke Xian sent troops led by Jia Hua (賈華) to attack Prince Yiwu in Erqu but Yiwu escaped to the State of Liang.

After the death of Duke Xian on the ninth month of 651 BCE, Li Ji placed the 15-year-old Crown Prince Xiqi on the throne and made Xun Xi the chancellor to help him in government affairs. On the tenth month of 651 BCE, Li Ke killed Xiqi roughly a month after his accession. Duke Xian was not yet properly buried at that time. Xun Xi then placed Zhuozi on the throne even though Zhuozi was still a toddler at that time. After that, Xun Xi finished the burial of Duke Xian. On the eleventh month of 651 BCE, Li Ke killed Zhuozi and his aunt Li Ji. Xun Xi then committed suicide by hanging himself. Shao Ji, the younger sister of Li Ji and mother of Zhuozi, was imprisoned.

Li Ke then invited Prince Chong'er who was then in the State of Qi back to ascend the Jin throne, but Chong'er declined. Li Ke then invited Prince Yiwu who was then in the State of Liang and he accepted. Yiwu ascended the throne, becoming posthumously known as Duke Hui.

== See also ==
- List of rebellions in China
