= Li Ke (general) =

Chinese general (died 650 BC)

Li Ke (Chinese: 里克; died 650 BC) was a general and official of the State of Jin during the Spring and Autumn period of Chinese history.

== Biography ==
Li Ke first appears in history as an official and general serving Duke Xian of Jin. In the summer of 658 BC, he led an army to attack the State of Guo (虢) with the assistance of the nearby State of Yu (虞), the duke of which granted Li Ke's army military access and the right to station near the Yu capital. Soon after Guo was conquered, Li Ke conquered Yu as well. This action, known as "Obtaining safe passage to conquer the State of Guo" (假道伐虢), was later enshrined as a part of the Thirty-Six Stratagems.

Duke Xian died in 651 BC. As Shensheng, the crown prince, had committed suicide, the succession had come into a state of flux. Li Ji, the late duke's wife, placed prince Xiqi, her own son with the late duke, onto the throne, but a month later, Li Ke killed Xiqi, and Chancellor Xun Xi (荀息) installed prince Zhuozi, Xiqi's half-brother, as the new duke. After another month, Li Ke killed Zhuozi and Li Ji, while Xun Xi committed suicide.

Li Ke had wanted to install prince Chong'er, the future Duke Wen of Jin, but he turned down the offer. After being promised land and position by prince Yiwu, being persuaded by Yiwu-aligned chancellors Xi Rui (郤芮) and Lu Xing (呂省), and seeing Duke Mu of Qin's military support of Yiwu, Li Ke installed prince Yiwu, the future Duke Hui of Jin, instead. Duke Hui, however, was wary of the fact that Li Ke had already deposed two dukes, and planned to kill him.

The duke sent an envoy to Li Ke to say to him, "If it had not been for you, I would not have attained this position. Nevertheless, you killed two rulers and one high officer. Are not those who become your ruler only making trouble for themselves?" Li Ke replied, "How would you, my lord, have risen to power had others not been cast aside? But if you wish to put the guilt on me, how could you fail to make a case? I have heard your command!" Then, Li Ke "fell upon his sword and died." Later, the duke expressed regret over killing Li Ke, claiming that he was a pillar to the state.
