= Huai of Jin =

Huai of Jin may refer to:

- Duke Huai of Jin (died 637 BC)
- Emperor Huai of Jin (284–313)
