= Lady Zhao (Three Kingdoms) =

Lady Zhao 趙姫

Personal details
- Born: Unknown Yuyang County, Yuzhou (modern-day Yuyang County, Henan Province)
- Died: 243 CE
- Spouse: Yu Wei
- Children: One daughter
- Profession: Historian, scholar

Lady Zhao (pinyin: Zhào Jī; died 243 CE) was a female historian and scholar during the Three Kingdoms period of China. Hailing from Yuyang County in Yuzhou, she served as a palace maid in the Eastern Wu kingdom and was known for her intelligence and literary talents. She was the wife of Yu Wei (虞韙), a county magistrate from Tongxiang County in Yu Province. Lady Zhao is also referred to as Yu the Chaste (虞貞節) and Mother Zhao (趙母).

Her literary contributions and intellectual achievements have left an enduring legacy, shedding light on the remarkable intellectual capabilities of women during the turbulent Three Kingdoms era, being compared with the famous female scholar Ban Zhao. As a result, her case was recorded in Huangfu Mi's Biographies of Exemplary Women which was supposed to be an instructional text for Confucian women.

== Early life ==
Lady Zhao's exact birth date remains shrouded in mystery. She was born into the Zhao family of Yuyang County in Yuzhou (modern-day Yuyang County, Henan Province). She was renowned for her exceptional intellect and extensive knowledge from a young age. Zhao Hui's marriage to Yu Wei, a county magistrate, resulted in the birth of their daughter.

As her daughter prepared to embark on married life, Lady Zhao shared a poignant piece of advice: "My dear daughter, when you join your husband's household, be careful not to do too many good deeds." Her daughter, puzzled, asked, "Mother, if not good deeds, should I then do bad deeds?" Lady Zhao responded, "Even good deeds can sometimes lead to unexpected consequences, let alone bad ones."

== Service in Eastern Wu council ==
Lady Zhao's literary prowess earned her considerable respect. After her husband's passing, her talents caught the attention of Sun Quan, the founder and ruler of Eastern Wu. She was summoned to serve within the court's administrative apparatus, where she was granted access to the government offices. Her contributions transcended the confines of her role as a palace maid.

In the 3rd year of the Jiahe era (234 CE), when Sun Quan contemplated leading an expedition against Gongsun Yuan, Lady Zhao submitted a memorial to the court, urging restraint and reconsideration. Sun Quan ultimately did not go through with the intended military campaign.

=== The "Zhao Mother Commentary" ===
Lady Zhao authored a significant work titled the "Zhao Mother Commentary" (趙母注), which served as an annotated commentary on the "Imperial Biographies" section of the "Book of the Later Han" and Liu Xiang's "Biographies of Exemplary Women". Her commentary was an extensive work, comprising several hundred thousand characters.

=== Death ===
Lady Zhao passed away in the 6th year of the Chiwu era (243 CE). Her literary contributions and intellectual achievements have left an enduring legacy, showcasing the intellectual capabilities of women during the Three Kingdoms period.

== Sources ==
- Huangfu Mi, "Biographies of Exemplary Women" (列女傳)
- Liu Yiqing, "A New Account of the Tales of the World" (世説新語), Volume on Virtuous Women
