= Hui of Jin =

Hui of Jin may refer to:

- Duke Hui of Jin (died 637 BC)
- Emperor Hui of Jin (259–307)
