= Xiqi =

Ji Xiqi 姬奚齊

Ruler of Jin
- Reign: 651 BC
- Predecessor: Duke Xian
- Successor: Ji Zhuozi
- Born: 665 BC
- Died: 651 BC
Names
- Ancestral name: Jī (姬); Given name: Xīqí (奚齊)
- House: Ji
- Dynasty: Jin
- Father: Duke Xian
- Mother: Li Ji

Ji Xiqi was briefly a ruler of the Jin state. He was the son of Duke Xian and his favored concubine Li Ji, and later replaced his older half-brother Ji Shensheng as crown prince. After the death of Duke Xian, he took the throne for about a month before being killed by Li Ke.

== Biography ==
In 665 BC, the twelfth year of the reign of Duke Xian of Jin, Li Ji gave birth to Xiqi. Since Li Ji wanted her son to be the crown prince, she bribed two of Duke Xian's most trusted officials, Liang Wu (梁五) and Dongguan Biwu (東關嬖五). The two officials persuaded Duke Xian of Jin to let princes Shensheng, Chong'er and Yiwu leave the capital, Jiang (絳). The officials told the duke that the northern Rong tribes (戎族) and Di tribes (狄族) frequently attacked Jin such that the princes were needed to defend their territory. Duke Xian then sent Shensheng to defend Quwo (曲沃), modern Quwo County in Shanxi. Duke Xian also sent Chong'er to defend the city of Pu (蒲), northwest of modern Xi County in Shanxi, and Yiwu to Erqu (二屈), modern Ji County in Shanxi.

In the ninth month of 651 BC, Duke Xian died. Li Ji placed the 14-year-old Crown Prince Xiqi on the throne of Jin and made Xun Xi the chancellor of Xiqi to help him in government affairs. On the tenth month of 651 BC, the Jin general Li Ke killed Xiqi roughly a month after his ascension. Duke Xian of Jin was not yet properly buried at that time. Xun Xi then placed Zhuozi, the younger half-brother of Xiqi, on the throne even though Zhuozi was still a toddler at that time. In the eleventh month of 651 BC, Li Ke killed Zhuozi and his aunt Li Ji. Xun Xi then committed suicide by hanging himself. Shao Ji, the younger sister of Li Ji and mother of Prince Zhuozi, was imprisoned.

Xiqi House of Ji Cadet branch of the House of Ji Born: 665 BC Died: 651 BC
Regnal titles
Preceded by Duke Xian of Jin	Duke of Jin; 651 BC	Succeeded by Zhuozi
