= Liang (state) =

Liang 梁
- ?–641 BCE
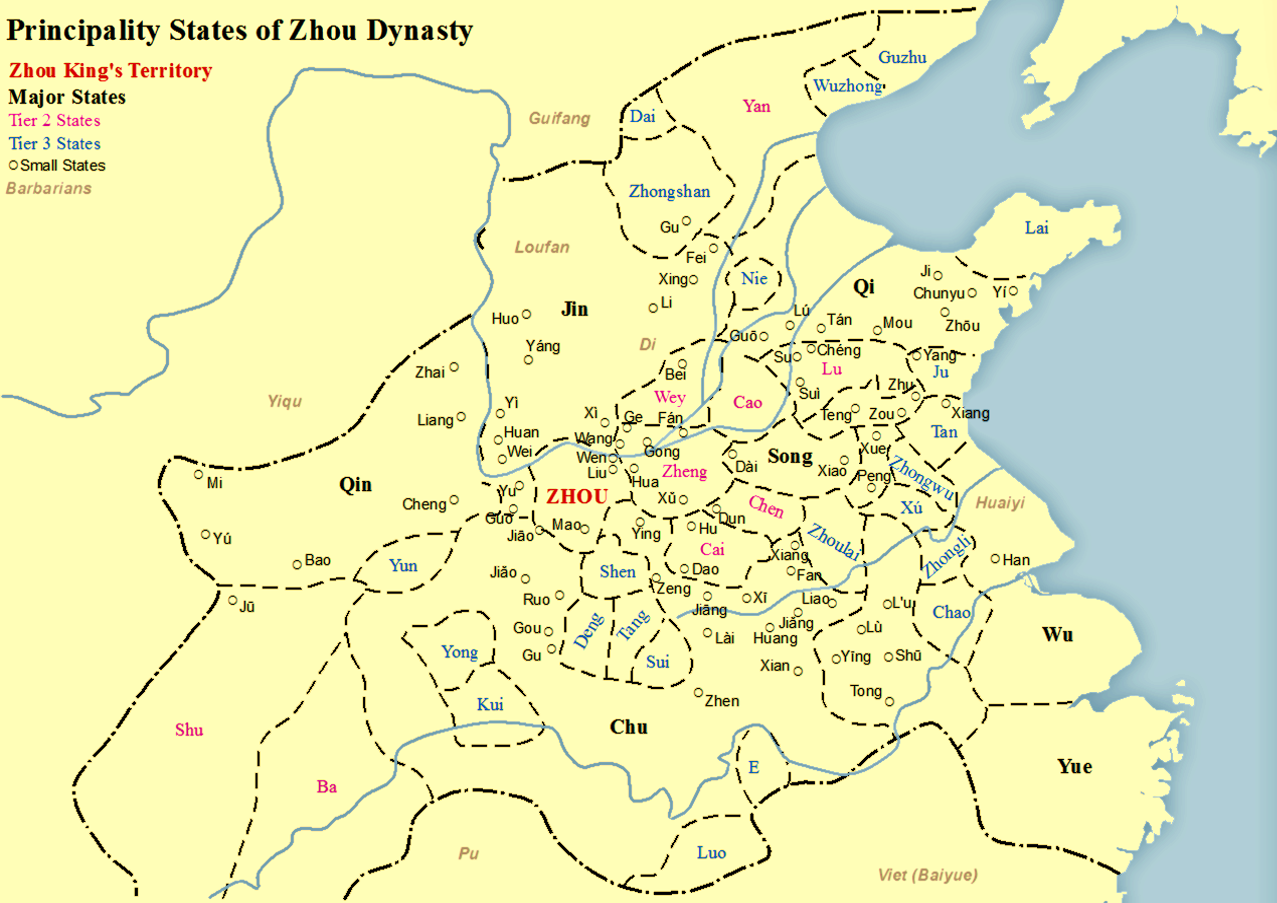
- Liang is a state in the western region, near Qin and Jin
- Status: Annexed by Qin
- Government: Monarchy
- Historical era: Eastern Zhou
  - Established: ?
  - Internal collapse followed by annexation.: 641 BCE
Preceded by	Succeeded by
?	Qin (state)
- Today part of: People's Republic of China

Liang (Chinese: 梁; pinyin: Liáng) was one of the states during the Spring and Autumn period of ancient China, bordering the State of Qin, which collapsed due to internal strife and was later annexed by Duke Mu of Qin in 641 BCE. The rulers of Liang had the surname Ying (嬴). The capital of Liang was located south of modern City of Hancheng in Shaanxi.

In 703 BC, the rulers of the five states of Western Guo, Rui, Xun (荀國) and Jia (賈國), including the State of Liang, suppressed Duke Wu of Quwo using armed force.

In 654 BC, Prince Yiwu from the State of Jin escaped to Liang. (Note: Yiwu's departure from the State of Jin resulted from the Li Ji Rebellion instigated by Duke Xian of Jin's wife Li Ji (concubine).) The ruler of Liang (梁伯) betrothed his daughter Liang Ying (梁嬴) to Prince Yiwu.

In 642 BC, the ruler of Liang wanted to build a new capital but it was seized by the State of Qin after it was completed.

In 641 BC, Liang was conquered by the State of Qin. According to the Zuo Zhuan, the Liang people were not able to bear the work given to them by the ruler of Liang so that the State of Qin easily conquered Liang.

== Liang in astronomy ==
Liang is represented by the star Delta Ophiuchi in asterism Right Wall, Heavenly Market enclosure (see Chinese constellation).
