= Duke Wen of Jin =

Ruler of Jin from 636 to 628 BC

Duke Wen of Jin 晉文公
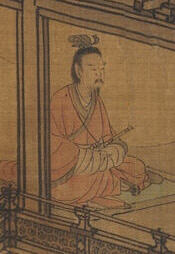
- Duke Wen of Jin Recovering His State by Li Tang, 1140

Duke of Jin
- Tenure: 636–628 BC
- Predecessor: Duke Huai
- Successor: Duke Xiang
- Full name: Ancestral name: Jī (姬); Given name: Chóng'ěr (重耳)
- Born: 697 BC
- Died: 628 BC (aged 68–69)
- Noble family: Jin
- Spouses: Ji Kui (季隗); Qi Jiang (齊姜); Huai Ying
- Issue: Ji Botiao (姬伯鯈); Ji Shuliu (姬叔劉); Duke Xiang; Ji Yong (姬雍); Ji Le (姬樂); Duke Cheng
- Father: Duke Xian
- Mother: Hu Ji Ji (胡季姬)
Duke Wen of Jin
- Traditional Chinese: 晉文公
- Simplified Chinese: 晋文公
- Literal meaning: Cultured Duke of Jin
Transcriptions
Standard Mandarin
- Hanyu Pinyin: Jìn Wén Gōng
- Wade–Giles: Chin Wen Kung
- IPA: [tɕîn wə̌n.kʊ́ŋ]
Yue: Cantonese
- Yale Romanization: Jeun Màhn Gūng
- Jyutping: Zeon^{3} Man^{4} Gung^{1}
Southern Min
- Tâi-lô: Tsìn Bûn Kong
Middle Chinese
- Middle Chinese: Tsìn Mjun Kuwng
Old Chinese
- Baxter–Sagart (2014): *Tsi[n]-s Mə[n] C.qˤong
Chong'er
- Chinese: 重耳
Transcriptions
Standard Mandarin
- Hanyu Pinyin: Chóng'ěr
- Wade–Giles: Ch‘ung-êrh
- IPA: [ʈʂʰʊ̌ŋ.àɚ]
Yue: Cantonese
- Yale Romanization: Chùhng-yíh
- Jyutping: Cung^{4}-ji^{5}
Southern Min
- Tâi-lô: Tîng-ní
Middle Chinese
- Middle Chinese: ɖjuwng-nyí
Old Chinese
- Baxter–Sagart (2014): *[m]-trong C.nəʔ

Duke Wen of Jin (697–628 BC), personal name Ji Chong'er, was Duke of Jin from 636 to 628 BC. He was exiled from Jin for approximately 20 years before finally assuming the throne and rapidly leading Jin to hegemony over the other Chinese states of his time.

Duke Wen is a figure in numerous Chinese legends, including those about his loyal courtier Jie Zhitui, whose death is said to have inspired China's Cold Food Festival and Qingming Festival.

== Names ==
"Duke Wen of Jin" is a posthumous name bestowed on him as part of his family's ancestral veneration. It literally means the "Cultured Duke of Jin". Duke Wen's given name was Chong'er. His clan name was Ji.

== Life ==
=== Early life ===
Prince Chong'er was born to Duke Xian of Jin in 697 BC. The Zuo Zhuan notes that "his ribs were all grown together," a sign of strength and leadership. Chong'er's half-brothers included Shensheng and Xiqi. While Shensheng was the original crown prince, in his later years Duke Xian favoured the concubine Li Ji, who desired her son Xiqi to be heir instead. As such, she plotted to discredit Shensheng before his father, eventually leading to Shensheng's suicide in 656 BC.

=== Wandering ===
This event led to a civil war in Jin, known as the Li Ji Unrest, where Duke Xian led several campaigns against his own sons, forcing them to flee Jin. With a retinue of capable men, including Zhao Cui, Hu Yan, Wei Chou (魏犨), Jia Tuo (賈佗), Xian Zhen (先軫), and Jie Zhitui, Chong'er fled to the north. In 651 BC, after the death of Duke Xian led to a succession crisis, Chong'er was invited to return to Jin and assume the duchy, but declined; the throne passed instead to his half-brother Yiwu, who became Duke Hui of Jin.

In 644 BC, after failed assassination attempts by Duke Hui, Chong'er moved to the State of Qi. He remained there until yet another succession crisis in Qi in 639 BC, whereupon he fled first to the State of Cao, then the states of Song, Zheng, Chu and finally the State of Qin. Over this 19-year period of exile, Chong'er gained both prestige and talented followers; a lady of a foreign court once commented that "When I look at the followers of the prince of Jin, every one of them is fit to be a premier of a state".

In 636 BC, after the death of Duke Hui, Duke Mu of Qin escorted Chong'er back to Jin with an army, and Chong'er was installed as the Duke of Jin.

=== Duke of Jin ===
Duke Wen undertook several major reforms of the state's military and civil institutions, partly in order to fill the gaps that had been caused by the slaughter of the ducal house previously. These included the formation of a three-army system, with an upper, middle and lower army each commanded by a General and a Lieutenant-General. The state was further invigorated by the many capable leaders Duke Wen had gathered from his wanderings, who were given senior military and governmental posts.

With this army, as well as his considerable prestige, Duke Wen was able to absorb many of the states around Jin, greatly increasing its extent, while also subjecting others as vassals; its vassal states included Cao, which he attacked in reprisal for the rude treatment afforded him during his exile. At the same time, he took the political stance of supporting the Eastern Zhou court and King Xiang of Zhou. When in 635 BC King Xiang was deposed and driven out by his brother, Duke Wen led a coalition of states which re-installed him as King.

At the same time, the northward expansion of the State of Chu was also resisted by Duke Wen; the two states' conflict was mostly played out among the smaller states which lay between their territories and formed alliances with one state or another. In 633 BC, Chu invaded the State of Song, which was an ally of Jin; Duke Wen led his coalition, including troops from Qin, Qi and Song, and won a decisive victory over Chu forces at the Battle of Chengpu in 632 BC. This battle checked Chu's northern expansion for decades, while cementing Duke Wen's position; the next year, he convened a large coalition of rulers at Jiantu, and was confirmed as hegemon over the other states, becoming one of the Five Hegemons.

Duke Wen died in 628 BC, and was succeeded by his son Duke Xiang of Jin; his son also inherited the hegemony, which would stay with Jin for nearly a century.

== Legends ==
=== Ordering the army to retreat three she ===
When Chong'er stayed at the court of Chu, its king set banquets for him and afforded him good treatment. At one meal, he asked Chong'er how he intended to repay this debt. Chong'er replied that, should Jin and Chu meet on the battlefield in the future, he would order his own troops to retreat three she (舍) or about 30 km (20 mi). After Chong'er was restored to his throne by the duke of Qin, he did meet Chu in battle. Remembering his promise, he ordered his men to retreat three she. He used the occasion, however, to lure the Chu commander Ziyu into an ambush at Chengpu and won the battle there.

=== Cold Food Festival ===
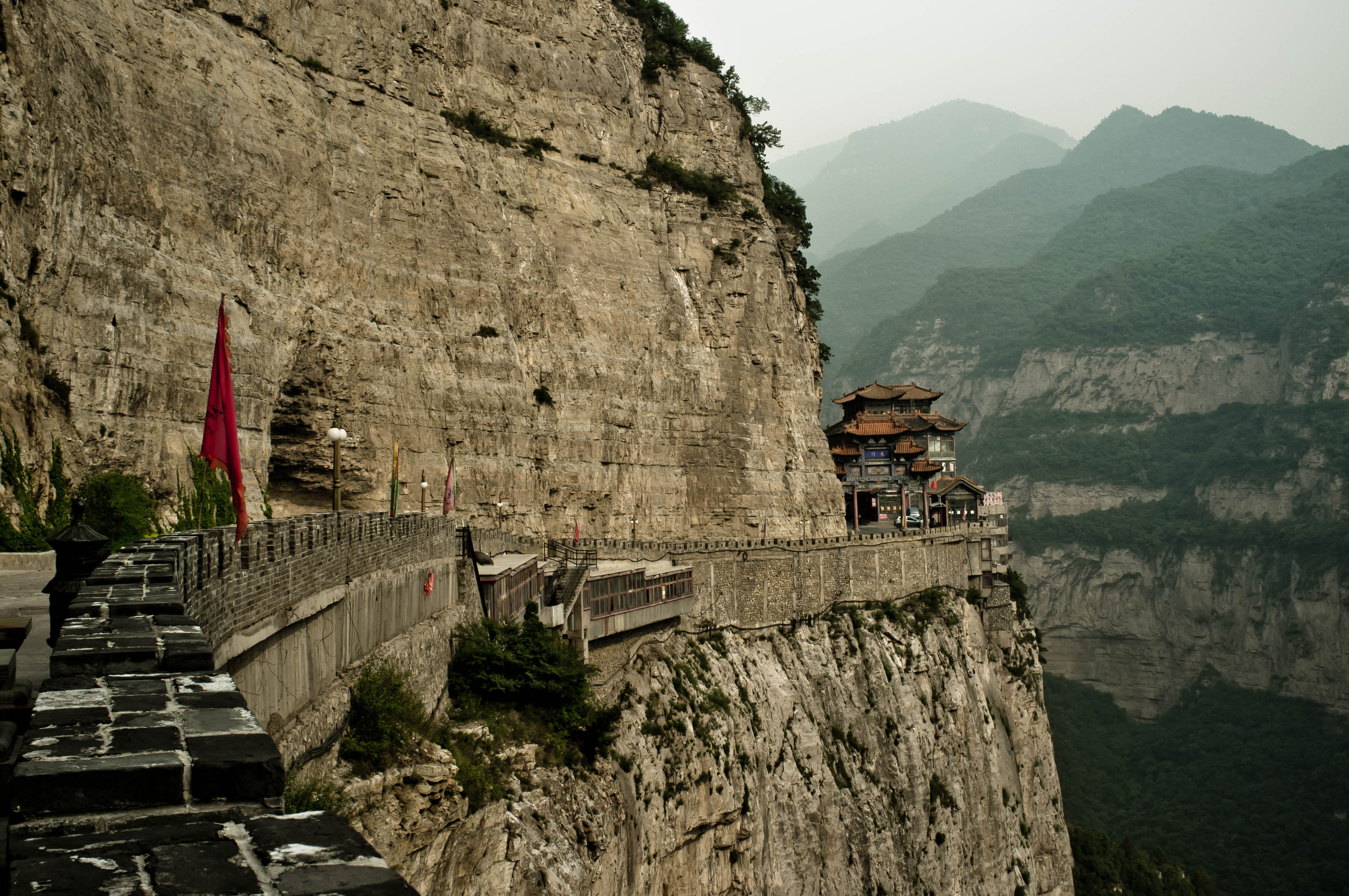
Mt Mian near Jiexiu, Shanxi, the supposed site of Chong'er's immolation of Jie Zhitui & his mother.

Accounts of Chong'er and his retainer and musician Jie Zhitui or Zitui circulated by at least the 4th century BC. (Note: Apart from the other sources mentioned, Jie appears in the Zuozhuan, the Huainanzi, the Songs of Chu, Master Lu's Spring and Autumn Annals, and the collected works of Han Fei and Zhuang Zhou.) Sima Qian relates that Jie was among those who followed the prince through all his years of exile but, crediting Heaven with Qin's willingness to install Chong'er in place of Duke Yu, he declined to present himself at court for reward and insulted those who did so. He and his mother left to become hermits in the forests around Mt Mian and were never seen again. Chong'er was distracted during this time by the chaos of his installation, as Yu's partisans started riots and even burnt down the ducal palace. He was eventually reminded of Jie by a poem about a dragon and some snakes that was posted on his new palace's main gate; unable to find or reward him, he set aside the fields of Mianshang to endow sacrifices in his honor. This later developed into a temple, and Jie became regarded as a Taoist immortal with power over the weather by the early Han.

Later legends embellished this story: after the retinue of exiles were robbed by bandits while traveling through the Chinese countryside, they ran so low on food that Chong'er was at risk of starvation. Jie prepared him a hearty soup of meat and wild herbs that revitalized him and, under questioning, revealed that he had used flesh from his own thigh to prepare it. Upon the prince's restoration in Jin, he proclaimed that "awards may be divided into three grades: the first-grade award goes to those [who] followed me into exile; the second-grade award goes to those who donated money; and the third grade goes to those who welcomed the return of my dukedom" and that even "those who have supported me in other ways but not yet been rewarded may report their names for awards". Jie, however, was overlooked and felt so sad that he retired to the countryside, carrying his mother on his back. Recalling his loyal follower months or years later, Chong'er personally wandered the forests and ridges looking for them. His new advisors suggested using a forest fire to drive Jie out, since his duty to his mother would overwhelm any other concerns. The fire was started on one or three sides, and men waited on the open end to welcome the official back into public service. Instead, the fire raged for three days and nights and the mother and son were found burnt to death beneath a willow. In his sorrow and guilt, Chong'er renamed the mountain after Jie. (The surrounding territory would also later take the name "Jiexiu" or "[Place of] Jie's [Final] Rest".) He also ordered a period of prohibition against fire in Jie's honor, forcing the people to eat cold food during three days around the Qingming solar term.

In fact, the Cold Food Festival is not attested before the Han and began as a month-long popular observance to placate Jie's spirit in the depths of winter. The hardship this caused—including death among infants and the elderly—caused it to be repeatedly banned over a period of centuries. The regulations succeeded in moving the festival to the end of spring (by Chinese reckoning), but it never died out in Shanxi and spread through the rest of China under the Sui and Tang. Aspects of ancestral veneration added to it from the old Double Third Festival eventually overshadowed the stories of Chong'er and Jie Zhitui, however, causing it to develop into the modern Tomb-Sweeping Festival instead.

== Offspring ==
Huan (驩). Born by Bi Ji (逼姞). He succeeded his father and was known as Duke Xiang of Jin. He was regarded as a good successor as he defeated Qin and Di, but died too early in 621 BC. His son became Duke Ling of Jin, and Duke Dao of Jin was the grandson of his another son named Jie.

Bo Ji (伯姬). Also born by Bi Ji (逼姞). She was married to Zhao Cui (趙衰), and was praised highly for returning the wifehood to the first wife Shu Wei (叔隗), thereby making herself a concubine. She bore three sons named Zhao Yingqi (趙嬰齊), Zhao Tong (趙同) and Zhao Kuo (趙括). Also known as Zhao Ji (趙姬) and Junjishi.

Yong (雍). Born by Du Qi (杜祁). He was initially sent to the State of Qin to be a minister in Qin to avoid the probable conflict among his brothers. When Duke Xiang of Jin died, Zhao Dun decided to let Yong succeed the throne, since he was elder and had a good reputation. Therefore, Yong was returning to Qin guarded by Qin troops. However, when Yong and the Qin troops were at border, Dun changed his mind and created Yigao (夷皋) as Duke Ling of Jin and attacked the Qin troops. Yong was killed in the attack from the State of Jin.

Le (Yue?) (樂). Born by Chen Ying (辰嬴) from the State of Qin. He was initially sent to the State of Chen to avoid the probable conflict among his brothers. When Duke Xiang died, another noble minister, Hu Shegu (狐射姑), wanted to make Le the duke and secretly fetched him from Chen. However, he was ambushed and killed on the way by fellows led by Gongsun Chujiu, one of the men of Zhao Dun.

Heitun (黑臀). Born by Zhou Nü (周女). He was initially sent to Zhou. When Duke Ling was murdered, he succeeded the throne and became Duke Cheng of Jin. He died in 600 BC.

== Family ==
- Father: Duke Xian of Jin
- Stepmother: Li Ji
- Brother: Shensheng, Hereditary Duke of Jin / Xiqi, Duke of Jin / Duke Hui of Jin
- Nephew: Duke Huai of Jin

== Legacy ==
Duke Wen's military and civil reforms created a framework of government which helped ensure the stability and preeminence of the Jin for subsequent decades. At the same time, though, it laid the framework for the political situation in the later years of Jin, when several houses of nobles came to dominate the ducal court. The houses of Wei and Zhao, for example, were consolidated by their military appointments in Duke Wen's court, setting the ground for their eventual domination and the partition of Jin two and a half centuries later.

Hong Kong's TVB made a television drama series about Duke Wen in the early 1990s called The Legend of Duke Wen (晉文公傳奇), starring Leon Lai. The series was semi-fictional, with many episodes featuring wuxia ("kung fu") scenes. Other dramatizations of his life include the 2011 Chinese series Song of Spring and Autumn, with the duke played by Gallen Lo.

In 2019 a Chinese historical romantic comedy television series called Chong Er's Preach was directed by Lai Shuiqing and Zhao Jian and starring Wang Longhua, Baby Zhang, Zhang Yishan, Madina Memet, Purba Rgyal, Shen Mengchen, and Gan Tingting. It is produced jointly by China Film Group Corporation, Global Hao Xiang Television Media and Shenzhen Yucong Cultural Media Co., Ltd.. The television series follows the story of the Duke Wen of Jin from exile to later ascending the throne to become hegemon.

Duke Wen of Jin House of Ji Cadet branch of the House of Ji Born: 697 BC Died: 628 BC
Regnal titles
Preceded by Duke Huai of Jin	Duke of Jin; 636–628 BC	Succeeded by Duke Xiang of Jin
