= Zhao Cui =

Zhao dynasty dafu

Viscount Cheng of Zhao 趙成子

Leader of Zhao clan
- Reign: 636–622 BC
- Successor: Viscount Xuan
- Died: 622 BC
- Spouse: Shu Kui; Zhao Ji (daughter of Duke Wen of Jin)
- Issue: Viscount Xuan (Zhao Dun); Zhao Tong; Zhao Kuo; Zhao Yingqi
Names
- Ancestral name: Yíng (嬴); Lineage name: Zhào (趙); Given name: Cuī (衰); Courtesy name: Zǐyú (子餘)
Posthumous name
- Viscount Cheng (成子)
- House: Ying
- Father: Zhao Gongmeng (趙共孟)

Zhao Cui (Chinese: 趙衰), also known by his posthumous name as the Viscount Cheng of Zhao (Chinese: 趙成子), also known as Chengji (成季), was leader of the Zhao clan in the Jin state from 636 BC to 622 BC. He served as dafu (大夫) during the reign of Duke Wen of Jin.

Duke Wen of Jin was exiled due to the Li Ji Unrest prior to taking the Jin throne. Zhao Cui had always accompanied Duke Wen of Jin during this period. In the Qin state, they received the assistance of Duke Mu of Qin.

After Duke Wen of Jin's death, he served Duke Xiang of Jin and participated in the Battle of Pengya. The Jin army defeated the Qin army in this battle.

== Family ==
Zhao Cui was a direct male descendant of Zaofu, for Zaofu's services, the King Mu of Zhou granted Zaofu a city called Zhao (趙), Zaofu and his descendants adopted Zhao as their surname.

Zhao Cui's brother was Zhao Su who served Duke Xian of Jin. Zhao Cui married the daughter of Duke Wen of Jin.

Before the marriage with the Duke's daughter, Zhai (翟) people caught two Qianggaoru (a branch of the Red Di) women, the young one was given to Chong'er as his wife and the older one was given to Zhao Xiu as his wife, so Cui had married the older one Shu Kui.

He had four sons and named them Zhao Dun (son of Shu Kui), Zhao Tong, Zhao Kuo and Zhao Yingqi respectively. Zhao Dun succeeded Zhao Cui as the head of Zhao. His father, Zhao GongMing is a legendary form of Cai Shen (The God of money in Chinese folk religion).
