= Huai Ying =

Chinese duchess (650–620 BC)

Huai Ying (Chinese: 懷嬴; 650–620 BC), was the duchess consort of Duke Huai of Jin (r. 637).

She was the daughter of the Duke Mu of Qin. She married Duke Huai of Jin in a marriage arranged by her father to ensure that her spouse, who was kept prisoner in Jin, did not escape. When he did escape, she cited loyalty to her father for not accompanying him, and loyalty to her spouse for not revealing his escape plan. When her spouse was succeeded by his uncle Duke Wen of Jin (r. 636-627), she was sent to Jin to act as the adviser of Duke Wen in issues concerning the relations between Jin and Qi, a task she evidently performed well, and she intervened in such issues on several known occasions.

== Legacy ==
She is included in the Biographies of Eminent women (Lienü zhuan).
