= Zhuozi (Jin) =

Ji Zhuozi 姬卓子

Ruler of Jin
- Reign: One month in 651 BC
- Predecessor: Ji Xiqi
- Successor: Duke Hui
- Died: 651 BC
Names
- Ancestral name: Jī (姬); Given name: Zhuózǐ (卓子)
- House: Ji
- Dynasty: Jin
- Father: Duke Xian
- Mother: Shao Ji (少姬)

Ji Zhuozi, also known as Daozi (Chinese: 悼子), was briefly a ruler of the Jin state. He was the son of Duke Xian, and his mother Shao Ji (少姬) was the younger sister of Duke Xian's favored concubine Li Ji.

When Duke Xian died in the ninth month of 651 BC, Ji Xiqi, the son of Li Ji, ascended the throne. However, only a month later Xiqi was killed by the minister Li Ke. Chancellor Xun Xi (荀息) then installed Zhuozi, Xiqi's younger half-brother and cousin, on the throne. But Zhuozi met the same fate as Xiqi: a month later he was also killed by Li Ke, and Xun Xi committed suicide. After Zhuozi's death, Li Ke installed his older half-brother, Duke Hui, on the throne. Duke Hui would later force Li Ke to commit suicide for the crime of killing Xiqi and Zhuozi.

Zhuozi House of Ji Cadet branch of the House of Ji Died: 651 BC
Regnal titles
Preceded by Xiqi	Duke of Jin; 651 BC	Succeeded by Duke Hui of Jin
