= Duke Xian of Jin =

Ruler of the state of Jin from 676 to 651 BC

Duke Xian of Jin 晉獻公
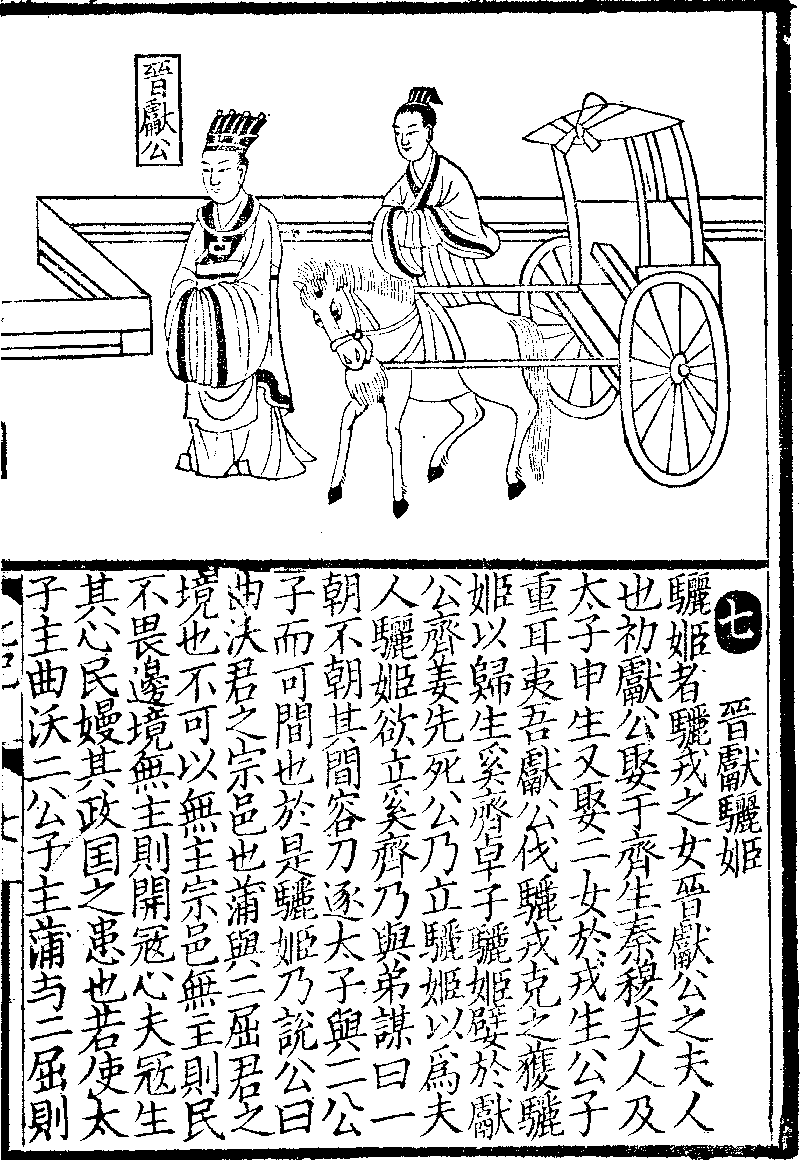

Duke of Jin
- Reign: 676–651 BC
- Predecessor: Duke Wu
- Successor: Ji Xiqi
- Died: 651 BC
- Spouse: Qi Jiang; Hu Ji; Li Ji; Shao Ji
- Issue: Wife of Duke Mu of Qin; Ji Shensheng; Duke Wen of Jin; Duke Hui of Jin; Ji Xiqi; Ji Zhuozi
Names
- Ancestral name: Jī (姬); Given name: Guǐzhū (詭諸)
Posthumous name
- Duke Xian (獻公)
- House: Ji
- Dynasty: Jin
- Father: Duke Wu

Duke Xian of Jin (Chinese: 晉獻公; pinyin: Jìn Xiàn Gōng), personal name Ji Guizhu, was a ruler of the Jin state, reigning for 26 years. He moved the capital from Quwo (曲沃) to Jiang (絳). He was named after the Rongdi (戎狄) leader Guizhu (詭諸), whom his father and predecessor, Duke Wu, captured alive.

During his reign, the Jin state became one of the most powerful and largest states due to his conquests of many small neighboring states. He is also renowned for the slaughter and exile of many ducal family members of Jin and for favoring one of his concubines, Li Ji.

== Rise to power ==
When he ascended the throne, Duke Xian of Jin and the duke of Guo visited King Hui of Zhou and they were given rewards which resulted to the increase of their popularity throughout the states. He also adopted a strategy that his official, Shi Wei (士蒍), suggested which involves the slaughter and exile of almost all the royal family members of Jin to ensure that the throne of Jin will always be held by one of his descendants. This resulted to the increase of the power of the duke and the loss of political power of the clan of the duke since the clan was almost annihilated.

To increase the military power of the state, he expanded his army into 2 troops, each having 10,000 men (some say 12,500). In 672 BC, the fifth year of his reign, he eliminated the Li Rong tribe and he obtained two women from the tribe: Li Ji and her younger sister, Shao Ji (少姬). Both women were favored by Duke Xian of Jin.

In 665 BC, the twelfth year of his reign, Li Ji gave birth to Xiqi. Since Duke Xian of Jin favored Li Ji, he had a desire to dethrone Shensheng, the eldest son of Duke Xian of Jin, from his position as crown prince to make Prince Xiqi the crown prince instead, so he sent Prince Shensheng to defend Quwo, modern Quwo County in Shanxi. Duke Xian of Jin also sent Prince Chong'er to defend the city of Pu and Prince Yiwu to Erqu (二屈), modern Ji County in Shanxi.

In 661 BC, the sixteenth year of his reign, he conquered the state of Geng (耿), the state of Huo (霍), the old state of Wei (魏) and the Rongdi tribe. The Jin official Bi Wan (畢萬) was given the land of the old state of Wei, and his descendants will later establish the new state of Wei. The Jin official Zhao Su (趙夙) helped conquer the state of Huo so he was given the land of the state of Geng and his descendants will later establish the state of Zhao. (Altogether Duke Xian annexed 17 states and subjugated 38 others.)

== Li Ji Rebellion ==
In 656 BC, the 21st year of his reign, Li Ji plotted a scheme for Shensheng which caused him to go back to Quwo to offer sacrifices for his deceased mother, Qi Jiang (齊姜). After the sacrifice, he gave some of the food to the palace for his father, Duke Xian of Jin. Li Ji secretly placed poison on them and when Duke Xian of Jin discovered that the food was poisoned, he assumed that Prince Shensheng plotted to kill him. Duke Xian of Jin then sent men to capture Prince Shensheng. When Prince Shensheng heard that his father sent men to capture him, he committed suicide on the twelfth month of that year. After Prince Shensheng committed suicide, Li Ji falsely accused Prince Chong'er and Yiwu of revolting so they escaped to Pu (蒲) and Erqu (二屈) respectively.

In 655 BC, the 22nd year of his reign, Duke Xian of Jin sent troops to Pu and Erqu to capture Chong'er and Yiwu. Chong'er escaped to the Di tribe, where his mother was from, and Prince Yiwu also escaped.

== Conquests of Yu and Guo ==
The neighboring State of Guo frequently attacked the border of Jin. Duke Xian wished to overthrow Guo, but needed passage through the State of Yu (虞國), which was allied with Guo, to do so. On the advice of his officer, Xun Xi (荀息), Duke Xian sent beautiful women to the Duke of Guo and a beautiful young man to the Duke of Yu with instructions to distract the rulers from government affairs. At the same time, men were sent to cause trouble on Guo's northern border.

As expected, officials in Guo blamed Duke Xian for the new trouble they were encountering on the northern border. Feigning insult, Duke Xian sent officer Xun Xi to the State of Yu to request passage so that they could avenge the insult. Bringing gifts of jade and horses, Xun Xi arrived in the State of Yu to request passage. Under the influence of his new beloved, the Duke of Yu immediately agreed, over the protestations of his own official, Gong Zhiqi (宮之奇). Gong Zhiqi described the relationship of Yu and Guo with the Chinese proverb "The teeth are cold when the lips are lost" (Chinese: 唇亡齿寒; pinyin: Chún Wáng Chǐ Hán). He told the Duke of Yu that if Guo were conquered, Yu would be next. The Duke of Yu ignored his warning and Gong Zhiqi secretly left the state of Yu, foreseeing its destruction.

In 658 BC, the 19th year of his reign, Duke Xian of Jin sent his general Li Ke and his officer Xun Xi to attack the State of Guo during the reign of Duke Chou of Guo (虢公醜). Ever more favorable to Jin, the Duke of Yu assisted in the invasion. He sent his own army to capture Xiayang Pass (下陽關) for Jin, under the ruse that his army was there to subdue the rebellious Quanrong tribe.

In the winter of 655 BC, the 22nd year of his reign, the State of Guo was conquered by Jin. The Duke of Yu was given a part of the women and treasures sacked from Guo. Li Ke was then granted permission to station the Jin army outside the Yu capital to rest. After a few days, the Duke of Yu was suddenly informed that Duke Xian of Jin was outside the city wall of the Yu capital. The Duke of Yu quickly went out to greet him and Duke Xian of Jin invited the Duke of Yu to the Ji Mountain (箕山) to hunt. In an ostentatious display, perhaps still under the influence of the beloved planted at his court by Duke Xian, the Duke of Yu brought the entire military force stationed in the capital to the hunt in the Ji Mountain.

While hunting, the Yu officer Baili Xi reported to the Duke of Yu trouble at the capital. By the time the Duke of Yu arrived at the outskirts of the city, the Yu capital has already been captured by the Jin army. The Duke of Yu and Baili Xi were held captive and brought back to the State of Jin. Baili Xi was recognized as a good officer by Duke Xian of Jin but Baili Xi rejected every offer given to him to become a court official of Jin. He was later given to the state of Qin as a servant dowry with Princess Bo Ji (伯姬). (The use of Yu to attack Guo was one of the Thirty-Six Stratagems).

== Later years ==
In 654 BC, the 23rd year of his reign, Duke Xian of Jin sent troops to attack Erqu and capture Prince Yiwu, but Prince Yiwu fled to the State of Liang. In 652 BC, the 25th year of his reign, he sent troop to attack the Di tribe and capture Prince Chong'er, but the army retreated when they met resistance. In that same year, the younger sister of Li Ji, also a concubine of Duke Xian of Jin, gave birth to Prince Zhuo.

At that time, the State of Jin was one of the largest and most powerful state in China. According to the Records of the Grand Historian, the Jin territory at that time extends west to the Hexi (河西) region (the region that extends from Shaanxi province to the west) and to the boundary of the western State of Qin, north to the Di tribe, and east to the Henei (河內) region (roughly the southern part of Hebei province).

== Death and legacy ==
In the summer of 651 BC, the 26th year of his reign, Duke Huan of Qi held an alliance meeting in Kuiqiu (葵丘), west of modern Minquan County in Shanxi. Duke Xian of Jin did not attend because he was sick at that time and Zaikong (宰孔) of Zhou advised him not to attend. Since he was gravely ill, he entrusted the then Crown Prince Xiqi to Xun Xi (荀息) and also gave Xun Xi the position of the chancellor of Jin. Duke Xian of Jin died on the ninth month of that year.

After the death of Duke Xian of Jin on the ninth month of 651 BC, Li Ji placed the 15-year-old Crown Prince Xiqi on the throne of Jin and made Xun Xi the chancellor of Xiqi to help him in government affairs. On the tenth month of 651 BC, Li Ke (里克) killed Xiqi roughly a month after his ascension. Duke Xian of Jin was not yet properly buried at that time. Xun Xi then placed Prince Zhuozi into the throne of Jin even though Zhuozi was still a toddler at that time. After that, Xun Xi finished the burial of Duke Xian of Jin. On the eleventh month of 651 BC, Li Ke killed Zhuozi and his aunt Li Ji. Xun Xi then committed suicide by hanging himself. Shao Ji, the younger sister of Li Ji and mother of Prince Zhuozi, was imprisoned.

Li Ke then invited Prince Chong'er who was then in the State of Qi back to the State of Jin to become the next duke. Chong'er declined so Li Ke then invited Prince Yiwu who was then in the State of Liang and he accepted. Prince Yiwu ascended the throne of Jin and became Duke Hui of Jin.

According to historical records, Duke Xian of Jin had six wives. The first was Jia Jun (賈君) from the State of Jia (賈國). Another is Qi Jiang (齊姜), formerly the concubine of Duke Wu of Jin, who gave birth to Princess Bo Ji (伯姬) and Shensheng. He also had Hu Ji (狐姬) from the northern Rong tribe (戎) who gave birth to Chong'er. Another was the younger sister of Hu Ji who gave birth to Prince Yiwu. Then there was Li Ji from the Lirong tribe who gave birth to Prince Xiqi. Lastly, there was Shao Ji (少姬), the younger sister of Li Ji, who gave birth to Prince Zhuo.

Duke Xian of Jin House of Ji Cadet branch of the House of Ji Died: 651 BC
Regnal titles
Preceded by Duke Wu of Jin	Duke of Jin; 676–651 BC	Succeeded by Xiqi
