= Concubine Li =

Concubine and later wife of Duke Xian of Jin

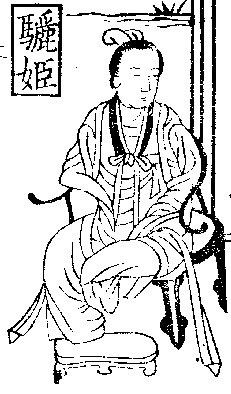

Li Ji (Chinese: 驪姬; pinyin: Lí Jī; died 651 BCE) was a concubine and later, wife of Duke Xian of Jin, ruler of the State of Jin between 676 and 651 BC during the Spring and Autumn period of ancient China. Li Ji is best known for starting the Li Ji Unrest, which led to the suicide of Prince Shensheng. She also placed her own son Xiqi on the Jin throne after the death of Duke Xian. She was nicknamed as the "Witch of the Age" (一代妖姬) because of her devious acts.

== Biography ==
Li Ji was originally a native of Li Rong (驪戎), one of the northern Rong tribes. In 672 BC, the fifth year of his reign, Duke Xian obtained two daughters of the leader of the Li Rong tribe: Li Ji and her younger sister, Shao Ji (少姬). Because of her beauty, Li Ji gained the favor of Duke Xian. Therefore, he had a desire to make Li Ji his main wife. Before doing so, he asked the gods through divination whether or not it was wise to do this. The answer he received was that the outcome would not be good. He asked a second time and on receiving a positive response, he made Li Ji his main wife, replacing Qi Jiang (齊姜).

=== Li Ji Unrest ===
In 665 BC, the twelfth year of the reign of Duke Xian, Li Ji gave birth to Prince Xiqi. Since Li Ji wanted her son to be the crown prince, she bribed two of Duke Xian's most trusted officials, Liang Wu (梁五) and Dongguan Biwu (東關嬖五). The two officials persuaded Duke Xian to let Shensheng, Chong'er, and Yiwu leave the capital, Jiang (絳). The officials told the duke that the northern Rong and Di tribes frequently attacked Jin such that the princes were needed to defend their territory. Duke Xian then sent Prince Shensheng to defend Quwo. Duke Xian also sent Chong'er to defend the city of Pu (蒲), northwest of modern Xi County in Shanxi, and Yiwu to Erqu (二屈), modern Ji County in Shanxi.

In 656 BC, the 21st year of the reign of Duke Xian, Li Ji plotted a scheme whereby Prince Shensheng went to Quwo and offered sacrifices for his deceased mother, Qi Jiang. Shensheng sent some of the food blessed by the gods to Duke Xian. Li Ji had secretly placed poison in the food in order to frame Shensheng for murder. Before Duke Xian began eating, he gave a part of the food to a dog to check for poison, whereupon the dog immediately collapsed. Discovering the poison in the food, Duke Xian sent men to Quwo to arrest Shensheng. Upon hearing the news, Shensheng committed suicide.

After Shensheng's suicide, Li Ji falsely accused Chong'er and Yiwu of revolting, and the two princes escaped to Pu and Erqu, respectively. In 655 BC, the 22nd year of his reign, Duke Xian sent troops to Pu and Erqu to capture Chong'er and Yiwu. Chong'er and some of his loyal subjects escaped to the Di tribe, where his mother came from. Prince Yiwu also escaped.

On the ninth month of 651 BC, Duke Xian died. Li Ji placed her 15-year-old son Xiqi on the throne and made Xun Xi the chancellor to help him in government affairs. In the tenth month of 651 BC, Jin general Li Ke (里克) killed Xiqi roughly a month after his ascension. Duke Xian was not yet properly buried at that time. Xun Xi then placed Zhuozi on the throne even though he was still a toddler. After that, Xun Xi finished the burial of Duke Xian of Jin. On the eleventh month of 651 BC, Li Ke killed Zhuozi. According to Discourses of the States and Biographies of Exemplary Women, Li Ke also had Li Ji flogged and killed. Xun Xi then committed suicide by hanging himself. Shao Ji, the younger sister of Li Ji and mother of Zhuozi, was imprisoned.

Li Ke then invited Prince Chong'er, who was then in the State of Qi, back to ascend the Jin throne, but Chong'er declined. Li Ke then invited Prince Yiwu, who was then in the State of Liang, and he accepted. Yiwu ascended the throne and became Duke Hui of Jin.

== Legacy ==
She is included in the "Biographies of Pernicious and Depraved Women" of the Biographies of Eminent women (Lienü zhuan).
