= Ji County, Shanxi =

Ji County 吉县
- County
- Location of the seat in Shanxi
- Coordinates (Ji County government): 36°05′48″N 110°40′50″E
- Country: People's Republic of China
- Province: Shanxi
- Prefecture-level city: Linfen

Area
  - Total: 1,780 km^{2} (690 sq mi)

Population (2013)
  - Total: 110,000
  - Density: 62/km^{2} (160/sq mi)
- Time zone: UTC+8 (China Standard)

Ji County, also known by its Chinese name Jixian (simplified Chinese: 吉县; traditional Chinese: 吉縣; pinyin: Jí Xiàn), is a county in the west of the prefecture-level city of Linfen, in southwestern Shanxi Province, China. The county spans an area of approximately 1,780 square kilometers, and has a population of approximately 110,000 people as of 2013.

== History ==
Under the Zhou, the area of present-day Ji County was part of the territory of Jin. Its principal town Erqu (二屈; Èrqū) was the seat of the appenage given to Duke Xian's son Ji Yiwu, who later became known as Duke Hui.

During the Three Kingdoms period, the area belonged to the Pingyang Commandery within the Cao Wei.

The area belonged to the Northern Wei dynasty, undergoing numerous administrative changes during the 5th century. The area then belonged to the Northern Qi and then the Northern Zhou dynasty.

The area belonged to the Sui dynasty upon its establishment in 581 CE, and was incorporated as the Jiyang Commandery (吉阳郡). In 584 CE, the Jiyang Commandery was abolished, and was merged into the newly formed Wencheng Commandery.

During the Republic of China, Ji County was established, and placed under the jurisdiction of Hedong Circuit.

Upon the establishment of the People's Republic of China in 1949, the area was placed under the Linfen Prefecture, which was renamed to the Jinnan Prefecture in 1954. The Jinnan Prefecture was abolished in 1970, and Ji County fell under the jurisdiction of the newly formed Linfen Prefecture.

In 2000, the Linfen Prefecture was changed to the prefecture-level city of Linfen.

The county was afflicted by the 2021 China floods, which flooded the Yellow River, destroying buildings throughout the county.

== Geography ==
The county spans approximately 1,780 square kilometers in area, bordering Yaodu District and Pu County to its east, Xiangning County to its south, Yichuan County to its west, and Daning County to its north.

The county is located at the southern end of the Lüliang Mountains. The Yellow River flows through Ji County, as well as the Qingshui River (清水河), and the Xinshui River. The county is home to the Hukou Waterfall.

== Climate ==
Climate data for Jixian, elevation 851 m (2,792 ft), (1991–2020 normals, extremes 1981–2010)
Month	Jan	Feb	Mar	Apr	May	Jun	Jul	Aug	Sep	Oct	Nov	Dec	Year
Record high °C (°F)	18.2 (64.8)	23.0 (73.4)	29.0 (84.2)	36.6 (97.9)	36.8 (98.2)	39.7 (103.5)	39.7 (103.5)	37.7 (99.9)	36.8 (98.2)	28.9 (84.0)	25.6 (78.1)	18.3 (64.9)	39.7 (103.5)
Mean daily maximum °C (°F)	2.8 (37.0)	7.4 (45.3)	14.0 (57.2)	20.9 (69.6)	25.8 (78.4)	29.7 (85.5)	30.5 (86.9)	28.7 (83.7)	23.9 (75.0)	18.1 (64.6)	11.3 (52.3)	4.4 (39.9)	18.1 (64.6)
Daily mean °C (°F)	−4.6 (23.7)	−0.3 (31.5)	6.2 (43.2)	13.1 (55.6)	18.2 (64.8)	22.4 (72.3)	24.1 (75.4)	22.4 (72.3)	17.3 (63.1)	10.9 (51.6)	3.9 (39.0)	−2.8 (27.0)	10.9 (51.6)
Mean daily minimum °C (°F)	−9.6 (14.7)	−5.5 (22.1)	0.1 (32.2)	6.3 (43.3)	11.2 (52.2)	15.8 (60.4)	19.0 (66.2)	17.7 (63.9)	12.6 (54.7)	5.9 (42.6)	−1.1 (30.0)	−7.6 (18.3)	5.4 (41.7)
Record low °C (°F)	−21.2 (−6.2)	−17.2 (1.0)	−11.7 (10.9)	−5.3 (22.5)	2.4 (36.3)	7.4 (45.3)	13.1 (55.6)	9.3 (48.7)	1.3 (34.3)	−6.2 (20.8)	−16.4 (2.5)	−21.3 (−6.3)	−21.3 (−6.3)
Average precipitation mm (inches)	5.4 (0.21)	7.8 (0.31)	11.2 (0.44)	30.3 (1.19)	43.9 (1.73)	62.3 (2.45)	107.3 (4.22)	102.9 (4.05)	75.1 (2.96)	44.2 (1.74)	15.6 (0.61)	3.4 (0.13)	509.4 (20.04)
Average precipitation days (≥ 0.1 mm)	2.6	3.5	4.2	6.2	7.8	8.6	11.9	10.6	9.9	7.7	4.5	2.3	79.8
Average snowy days	3.7	4.2	2.1	0.4	0	0	0	0	0	0.1	2.2	3.1	15.8
Average relative humidity (%)	53	52	46	48	51	58	70	74	74	70	62	54	59
Mean monthly sunshine hours	168.0	160.4	195.8	220.2	240.4	220.9	205.0	189.8	168.2	170.4	161.7	172.4	2,273.2
Percentage possible sunshine	54	52	53	56	55	51	46	46	46	49	53	57	52
Source: China Meteorological Administration

== Administrative divisions ==
Ji County is divided into three towns and five townships. The county government is seated in the town of Jichang.

The county's three towns are Jichang, Tunli, and Hukou.

The county's five townships are Checheng Township, Wencheng Township, Dongcheng Township, Baishansi Township, and Zhongduo Township.
