= Shensheng =

Shensheng (申生)
- Crown Prince of Jin
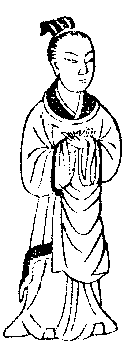
- Died: 655 BCE (traditionally 656)
- Father: Duke Xian of Jin
- Mother: Qi Jiang

Shensheng (Chinese: 申生; pinyin: Shēnshēng, died 20 February 655 BCE), ancestral name Ji (姬), was the eldest son of Duke Xian of Jin and the Crown Prince of the State of Jin before being replaced by his half-brother Xiqi. One of his sisters, Lady Mu, later became the wife of Duke Mu of Qin.

== Biography ==
Shensheng was the son of Qi Jiang (齊姜), the first wife of Duke Xian of Jin. Because Duke Xian of Jin favored his concubine Li Ji, in 665 BCE he sent away three of his older sons. Shensheng was sent to live in Quwo, modern Quwo County in Shanxi. In 661 BCE, in order to ensure Shensheng's continued political isolation from the Jin court, Duke Xian split a branch off his army and made Shensheng its general, with the command to garrison Quwo. Three years later, Duke Xian officially replaced Shensheng as crown prince with Li Ji's son Xiqi.

In 656 BCE, the Li Ji Rebellion started with the scheme that caused the suicide of Shensheng. Shensheng was asked to offer sacrifices to his deceased mother, Qi Jiang. Shensheng sent some of the food blessed by the gods to Duke Xian. Li Ji had secretly placed poison in the food in order to frame Shensheng for murder. Before Duke Xian began eating, he gave a part of the food to a dog to check for poison, and the dog immediately collapsed. Discovering the poison in the food, Duke Xian killed Shensheng's teacher Du Yuankuan (杜原款) and sent men to Quwo to arrest Shensheng.

Shensheng was advised to defend himself before Duke Xian by revealing Li Ji's plot. Shensheng replied that he wouldn't like to break his father's heart by revealing Li Ji's plot. When Chong'er advised him to escape, he replied that if he escaped it would appear as if he really had planned to kill his father, and no one in the world would protect him then. Shensheng subsequently hanged himself.

Due to the filial piety and loyalty of Shensheng, he was given the posthumous title "Gong Taizi" (恭太子) or "Gong Shizi" (恭世子), both meaning "the respectful crown prince".

According to the Records of the Grand Historian, Duke Hui of Jin disrespectfully transferred Shensheng's burial to another place which made the spirit of Shensheng angry. The spirit of Shensheng then appeared in front of the Jin official Hu Tu (狐突) and told him that Shensheng has pleaded to the heavenly god to let the State of Qin conquer the State of Jin as a punishment. After persuasions made by Hu Tu, Shensheng replied that the heavenly god has allowed that Duke Hui of Jin be defeated in battle at the land of Han as a punishment. After that, the spirit disappeared.

== Bibliography ==
- Liu Xiang, 說苑校證 (Annotated Shuoyuan), [0s BCE]. Xiang Zonglu (向宗魯), ed. Beijing: Zhonghua Publishing, 1987.
- Lü Buwei 呂氏春秋集釋 (Collected Readings of the Lüshi Chunqiu), [239 BCE]. Xu Weiyu (許維遹), [1933], ed. 2 vols. Beijing: Zhonghua Publishing, [2009] 2010.
- Sima Qian, 史記 (Shiji) [10s BCE]. 10 vols. Beijing: Zhonghua Publishing, [1959] 1963.
- Wang Chong, 論衡集釋 (Collected Readings of the Lunheng), [80s]. Liu Pansui (劉盼遂) [1932], annotation; Huang Hui (黃暉), ed. 4 vols. Beijing: Zhonghua Publishing, 1990.
- Xu Yuangao (徐元誥), ed., 國語集解 (Collected Readings of the Guoyu). Beijing: Zhonghua Publishing, 2002.
- Yang Bojun, ed., 春秋左傳注修訂本 (Annotated Zuozhuan, Revised Edition). 4 vols. Beijing: Zhonghua Publishing, [1981] 1993.
- Zhang Peiyu (張培瑜), 中國先秦史歷表 (Historical Almanac of Pre-Imperial China). Jinan: Qi Lu Publishing, 1987.
