= Duke Huai of Jin =

Ruler of the state of Jin

Duke Huai of Jin 晉懷公

Duke of Jin
- Reign: 637 BC
- Predecessor: Duke Hui
- Successor: Duke Wen
- Died: 637 BC
- Spouse: Huai Ying
Names
- Ancestral name: Jī (姬); Given name: Yǔ (圉)
Posthumous name
- Duke Huai (懷公)
- House: Ji
- Dynasty: Jin
- Father: Duke Hui
- Mother: Princess of Liang

Yu
- Chinese: 圉
Transcriptions
Standard Mandarin
- Hanyu Pinyin: Yǔ
- Wade–Giles: Yü

Posthumous name
- Traditional Chinese: 晉懷公
- Simplified Chinese: 晋怀公
Transcriptions
Standard Mandarin
- Hanyu Pinyin: Jìn Huái Gōng
- Wade–Giles: Chin Huai Kung

Duke Huai of Jin, personal name Ji Yu, was briefly the duke of the Jin state in 637 BC.

== Life ==
Yu's father was the future Duke Hui of Jin, who married a princess of Liang during his exile there. Ji became known as Crown Prince Yu when his father assumed the duchy of Jin. In 643 BC, Prince Yu was sent to the State of Qin as a hostage, where he married Princess Huai Ying (懷嬴), a daughter of Duke Mu of Qin, the powerful ruler of Qin at the time. In 641 BC, Qin conquered and annexed Liang.

In 638 BC, Duke Hui of Jin became ill. As Prince Yu was a hostage in Qin and his mother's state had been destroyed, he was worried that Duke Hui might replace him as crown prince with one of his other sons. He decided to escape back to Jin. Huai Ying refused to escape with him but agreed not to reveal his plan.

Duke Hui died in the ninth month of 637 BC, and Prince Yu ascended the throne, to be known as Duke Huai of Jin. Duke Mu of Qin, however, was angry at Prince Yu for his escape from Qin and supported Duke Hui's brother Chong'er. He even married five of his daughters, including Huai Ying, to Chong'er. With the support of the Qin army, as well as Jin generals Luan Zhi and Xi Hu (郤縠), Chong'er killed Duke Huai at Gaoliang and ascended the throne as Duke Wen of Jin.

Duke Huai of Jin House of Ji Cadet branch of the House of Ji Died: 637 BC
Regnal titles
Preceded by Duke Hui of Jin	Duke of Jin; 637 BC	Succeeded by Duke Wen of Jin
