= Duke Hui of Jin =

Duke Hui of Jin 晉惠公

Ruler of Jin
- Reign: 650–637 BC
- Predecessor: Ji Zhuozi
- Successor: Duke Huai
- Died: 637 BC
- Issue: Duke Huai; Ji Qie (姬妾)
Names
- Ancestral name: Jī (姬); Given name: Yíwú (夷吾)
Posthumous name
- Duke Hui (惠公)
- House: Ji
- Dynasty: Jin
- Father: Duke Xian
- Mother: Xiao Rong Zi (小戎子)

Yiwu
- Chinese: 夷吾
Transcriptions
Standard Mandarin
- Hanyu Pinyin: Yíwú
- Wade–Giles: I-wu

Posthumous name
- Traditional Chinese: 晉惠公
- Simplified Chinese: 晋惠公
- Literal meaning: The Benevolent Duke of Jin; The Kind Duke of Jin
Transcriptions
Standard Mandarin
- Hanyu Pinyin: Jìn Huì Gōng
- Wade–Giles: Chin Hui Kung

Duke Hui of Jin, personal name Ji Yiwu, was duke of the Jin state from 650 BC to 637 BC.

== Life ==
=== Early life ===
Yiwu was one of the nine sons of Duke Xian. His mother was Xiao Rongzi. He was the younger sibling of Shensheng and Chong'er (later Duke Wen) and the older sibling of Xiqi.

As part of her scheme to secure the succession to her son, the concubine Li Ji removed Xiqi's older siblings from the capital on the pretext of pacifying their territories. Prince Yiwu was sent to defend Erqu in what is now Ji County, Shanxi.

After the death of Duke Xian in the ninth lunar month during 651 BC, Li Ji placed the 15-year-old Xiqi on the throne and made Xun Xi (荀息) chancellor to help him with administration. In the tenth lunar month of 651 BC, before Duke Xian had even been properly buried, a Jin minister named Li Ke killed Xiqi. The chancellor Xun Xi then placed Zhuozi, the youngest son of Duke Xian, on the throne even though he was still just a toddler at that time. Xun Xi then finished the burial of Duke Xian. In the eleventh lunar month of 651 BC, Li Ke killed Zhuozi and his aunt Li Ji. Xun Xi then committed suicide by hanging himself. Shao Ji (少姬), the younger sister of Li Ji and mother of Zhuozi, was imprisoned.

Li Ke first invited Prince Chong'er (then in the State of Qi) to return to Jin to become the next duke. After Chong'er declined, Li Ke extended the same offer to his younger brother Prince Yiwu, then in the State of Liang. Yiwu accepted and was enthroned as the next duke of Jin.

=== As duke ===
As duke, Yiwu sentenced Li Ke to commit suicide to atone for his role in the deaths of his two predecessors.

In the fourth year of his reign (647 BC), Jin experienced a famine and requested that the State of Qin sell some of its grain. Duke Mu of Qin agreed and sold the grain to Jin.

In the fifth year of his reign (646 BC), Qin experienced a famine but Yiwu refused to sell any grain to them, despite its assistance the year before and the advice of the minister Qing Zheng (慶鄭). Enraged, Duke Mu invaded Jin's territory in Han. Prior to battle, Yiwu refused to let Qing Zheng drive his chariot. When it became stuck in the mud during the battle, Yiwu then demanded that Qing Zheng help him; instead, the minister simply walked away. Liang Yao (梁繇) then attempted to free the chariot while Guo She (虢射) protected the duke, even attacking Duke Mu. In the end, the Jin troops fled in retreat and Yiwu was captured and taken as a captive back to Qin. On the day that he was to be killed as an offering to the gods, his half-sister Bo Ji (伯姬) wept and wore mourning clothes. Her husband Duke Mu admonished her and told her that the capture of the enemy of their state should be celebrated. He then repeated a story he had heard that the famous politician Jizi had once praised the Jin patriarch Shu Yu, saying that his descendants would thrive and be prosperous. He agreed to spare Yiwu's life, escorting him back to Jin and forming an alliance with Jin in the eleventh lunar month.

Restored to power, Yiwu immediately killed Qing Zheng and reordered the government of Jin. Because many of his ministers held his older brother in affection and were open to the idea of a change in leadership, Yiwu sent assassins to the Di tribe (翟族) of the northern Rong (戎族) to kill him. Prince Chong'er and his attendants heard about this, however, and escaped to Qi.

In the eighth year of his reign (643 BC), he sent his son Crown Prince Yu to Qin as a hostage.

In 641 BC, Duke Mu invaded Liang, the small state which had once sheltered Yiwu. The count had been attempting to massively fortify his capital but construction was not complete, his people were tired and dissatisfied from their forced work, and Qin was able to conquer them easily.

In the thirteenth year of his reign (638 BC), Yiwu grew gravely ill. Crown Prince Yu and his wife Huai Ying (懷嬴) heard of this and fled their captivity in Qin, arriving in Jin before the duke had died. In the ninth lunar month of the fourteenth year of his reign (637 BC), Yiwu died and was posthumously entitled Duke Hui of Jin ("The Benevolent Duke of Jin"). Crown Prince Yu ascended the throne, later becoming known as Duke Huai.

Duke Hui of Jin House of Ji Cadet branch of the House of Ji Died: 637 BC
Regnal titles
Preceded by Zhuozi	Duke of Jin; 650–637 BC	Succeeded by Duke Huai of Jin
