= Pu County =

Coordinates: 36°24′47″N 111°05′55″E

Pu County 蒲县
- County
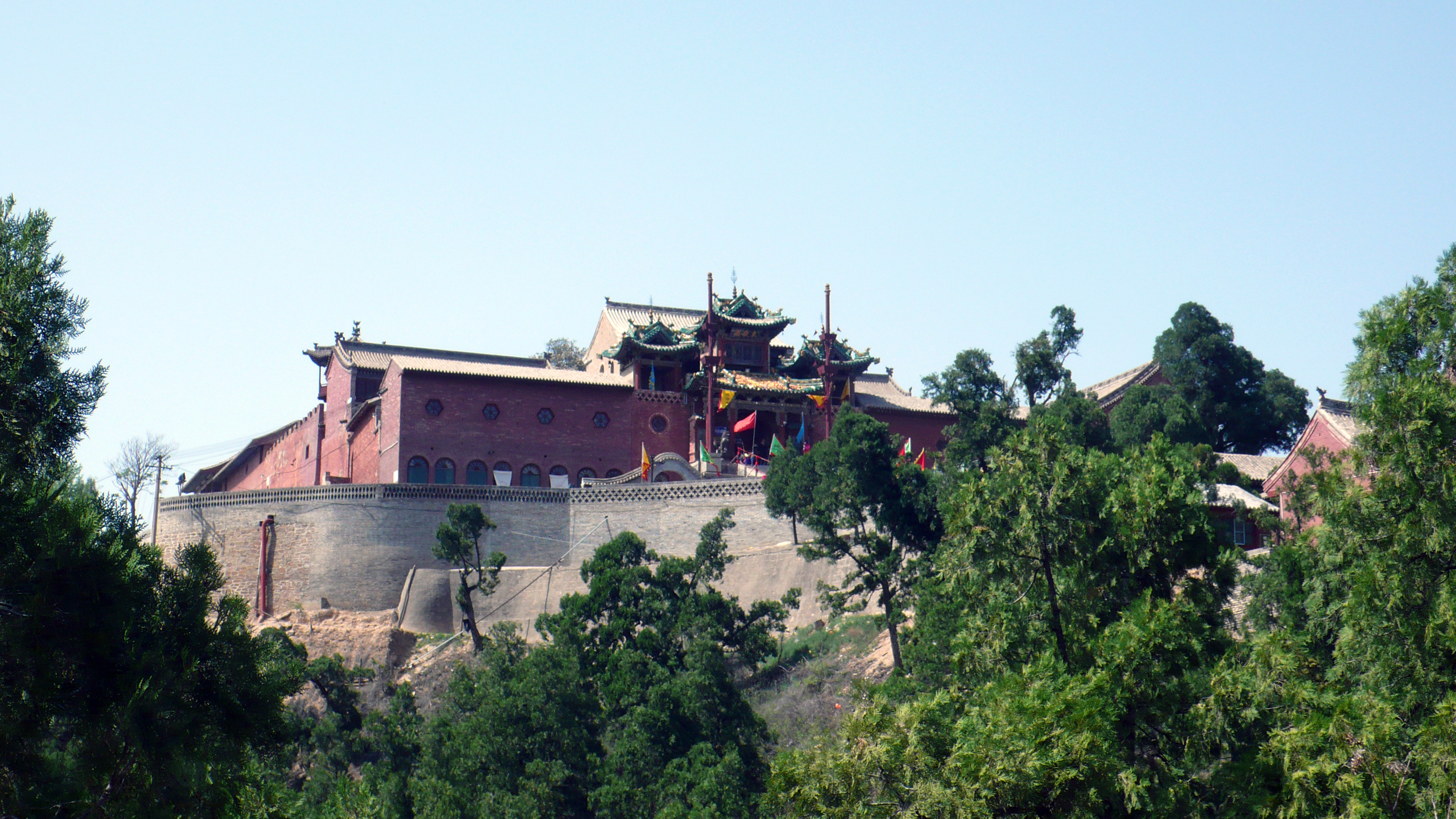
- Baishan Dongyue Temple

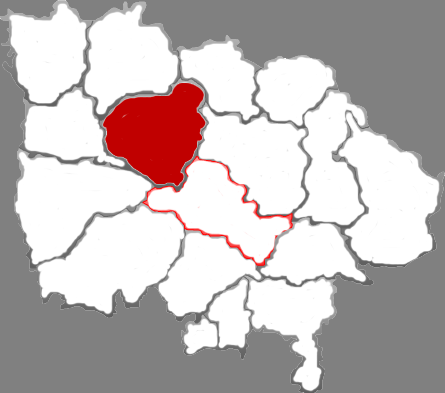
- Pu County in Linfen

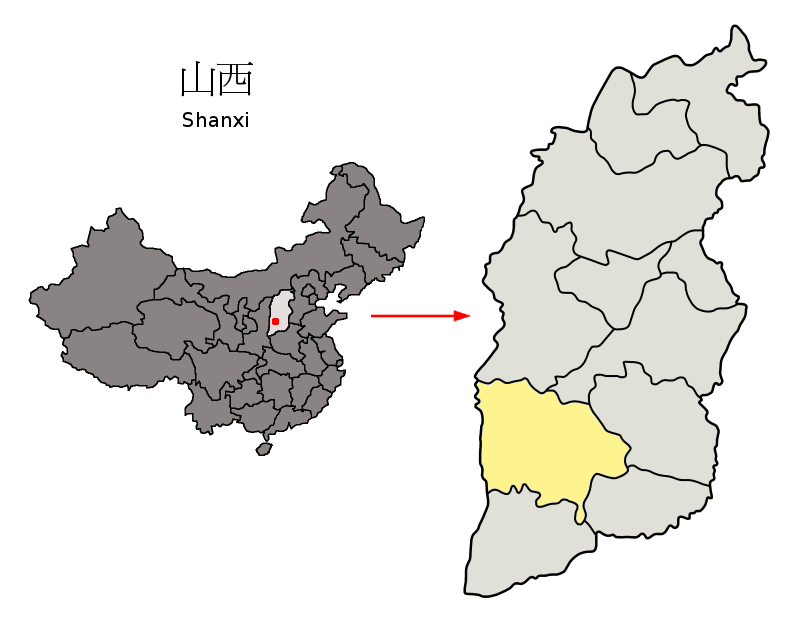
- Linfen in Shanxi
- Country: People's Republic of China
- Province: Shanxi
- Prefecture-level city: Linfen

Area
  - Total: 1,513 km^{2} (584 sq mi)

Population (2010)
  - Total: 107,339
  - Density: 70.94/km^{2} (183.7/sq mi)
- Time zone: UTC+8 (China Standard)
- Postal code: 041200

Pu County
- Traditional Chinese: 蒲縣
- Simplified Chinese: 蒲县
- Literal meaning: Cattail County
Transcriptions
Standard Mandarin
- Hanyu Pinyin: Púxiàn
- Wade–Giles: P‘u Hsien

Pu County (simplified Chinese: 蒲县; traditional Chinese: 蒲縣; pinyin: Pú Xiàn), also known by its Chinese name Puxian, is a county in the southwest of Shanxi province, China. It is under the administration of the prefecture-level city of Linfen; bordering county-level divisions are Yaodu District (the urban area of Linfen) to the southeast, Ji County to the southwest, Daning County to the west, Xi County to the north, Fenxi County to the northeast, and Hongtong County to the east.

Pu County spans an area of 1,513 square kilometres (584 mi^{2}), and had a population of 107,339 according to the 2010 Chinese census.

== Toponymy ==
Pu County is named after the fabled Puzi Mountain (Chinese: 蒲子山; pinyin: Púzi Shān) in the area.

== History ==
=== Spring and Autumn period ===
During the Spring and Autumn period of Chinese history, the city of Pu and its hinterland were the appendage of the Jin prince Ji Chong'er before the Rong beauty Li Ji successfully schemed to drive him from the country in 655 BC and to place her own son into succession for the duchy. Pu would have also been a home to the famous courtiers like Jie Zhitui who followed Ji Chong'er into his exile. Their court was later imposed on Jin by a Qin army in 636 BC, with Ji Chong'er as the state's Wen Duke.

=== Northern Wei ===
During the Northern Wei, the ancient Pingchang County (Chinese: 平昌县; pinyin: Píngchāng Xiàn) was located close to present-day Pu County, which fell under the jurisdiction of Tujing Commandery. Later in the Northern Wei, the area would be reorganized as Shicheng County (Chinese: 石城县; pinyin: Shíchéng Xiàn), under the jurisdiction of Shicheng Commandery.

=== Post-Northern Wei ===
In 579 CE, Shicheng County was renamed to Puzi County (Chinese: 蒲子县; pinyin: Púzi Xiàn), and was placed under the jurisdiction of Dingyang Commandery. In 606 CE, Puzi County was renamed to Pu County (Chinese: 蒲县; pinyin: Pú Xiàn), and was placed under the jurisdiction of Longquan Commandery.

=== Republic of China ===
During the early years of the Republic of China, Pu County was administered by Hedong Circuit, and then placed under provincial administration upon the abolition of circuits.

=== People's Republic of China ===
Upon the foundation of the People's Republic of China in 1949, Pu County was placed under Linfen Prefecture, which was renamed Jinnan Prefecture in 1954. The county was abolished from 1958 to 1961. In 2000, it was placed under the jurisdiction of the prefecture-level city of Linfen.

On October 6, 2021, the county was afflicted by a flood which killed four people in the village of Jingpo (Chinese: 荆坡村) in the town of Pucheng.

== Geography ==
The county's highest point is Wulu Mountain (Chinese: 五鹿山; pinyin: Wǔlù Shān), which reaches 1,946 metres (6,385 ft) in height. The county's lowest point is 790 metres (2,590 ft) in height.

The Xinshui River flows through Pu County, as does a number of its tributaries.

== Climate ==
Climate data for Puxian, elevation 1,031 m (3,383 ft), (1991–2020 normals, extremes 1981–present)
Month	Jan	Feb	Mar	Apr	May	Jun	Jul	Aug	Sep	Oct	Nov	Dec	Year
Record high °C (°F)	16.5 (61.7)	24.7 (76.5)	28.1 (82.6)	34.4 (93.9)	36.0 (96.8)	38.1 (100.6)	38.5 (101.3)	36.0 (96.8)	25.8 (78.4)	29.3 (84.7)	25.1 (77.2)	17.8 (64.0)	38.5 (101.3)
Mean daily maximum °C (°F)	1.1 (34.0)	5.8 (42.4)	12.4 (54.3)	19.7 (67.5)	24.6 (76.3)	28.6 (83.5)	29.4 (84.9)	27.6 (81.7)	22.8 (73.0)	16.8 (62.2)	9.6 (49.3)	2.6 (36.7)	16.8 (62.2)
Daily mean °C (°F)	−6.1 (21.0)	−1.7 (28.9)	4.5 (40.1)	11.5 (52.7)	16.7 (62.1)	20.9 (69.6)	22.7 (72.9)	21.0 (69.8)	15.9 (60.6)	9.4 (48.9)	2.2 (36.0)	−4.4 (24.1)	9.4 (48.9)
Mean daily minimum °C (°F)	−11.3 (11.7)	−7.2 (19.0)	−1.7 (28.9)	4.3 (39.7)	9.2 (48.6)	13.9 (57.0)	17.2 (63.0)	16.1 (61.0)	10.9 (51.6)	4.2 (39.6)	−2.7 (27.1)	−9.3 (15.3)	3.6 (38.5)
Record low °C (°F)	−23.9 (−11.0)	−21.9 (−7.4)	−17.7 (0.1)	−9.7 (14.5)	−0.9 (30.4)	4.6 (40.3)	10.2 (50.4)	7.1 (44.8)	−1.1 (30.0)	−7.8 (18.0)	−19.6 (−3.3)	−23.6 (−10.5)	−23.9 (−11.0)
Average precipitation mm (inches)	3.8 (0.15)	6.0 (0.24)	10.7 (0.42)	28.6 (1.13)	42.2 (1.66)	61.9 (2.44)	119.9 (4.72)	101.9 (4.01)	69.4 (2.73)	40.1 (1.58)	16.4 (0.65)	3.0 (0.12)	503.9 (19.85)
Average precipitation days (≥ 0.1 mm)	3.3	3.5	4.6	6.1	7.7	9.4	13.3	12.1	10.1	7.4	4.6	2.6	84.7
Average snowy days	4.2	4.6	2.8	0.4	0	0	0	0	0	0.1	2.3	3.4	17.8
Average relative humidity (%)	57	54	50	49	53	60	72	75	74	69	62	56	61
Mean monthly sunshine hours	177.0	171.4	201.6	224.4	243.9	230.8	216.3	195.8	173.6	183.1	173.5	183.0	2,374.4
Percentage possible sunshine	57	55	54	57	56	53	49	47	47	53	57	61	54
Source: China Meteorological Administration

== Administrative divisions ==
Pu County administers four towns and five townships.

=== Towns ===
The county's four towns are Pucheng, Xueguan, Heilongguan, and Kecheng.

=== Townships ===
The county's five townships are Shanzhong Township, Guxian Township, Hongdao Township, Qiaojiawan Township, and Tailin Township.

== Demographics ==
According the 2010 Chinese census, the county had a population of 107,339, up from the 98,860 reported in the 2000 Chinese census. The county had an estimated population of about 80,000 as of 1996.
