= Quwo County =

Quwo County 曲沃县 Kuwo; Küwo
- County
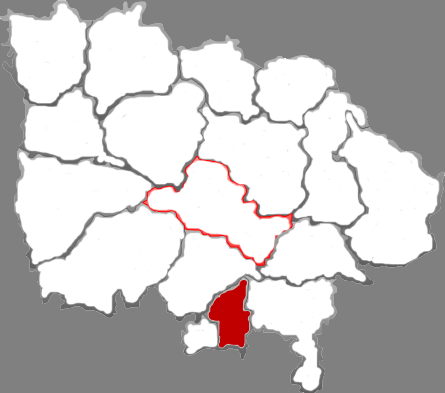
- Quwo in Linfen

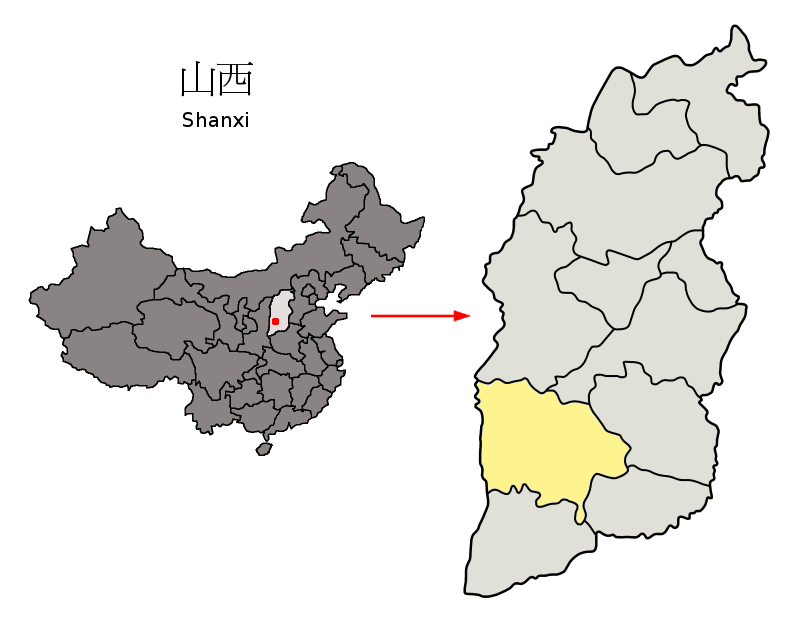
- Linfen in Shanxi
- Coordinates (Quwo County government): 35°38′31″N 111°28′33″E
- Country: People's Republic of China
- Province: Shanxi
- Prefecture-level city: Linfen

Area
  - Total: 437 km^{2} (169 sq mi)

Population (2013)
  - Total: 230,000
  - Density: 530/km^{2} (1,400/sq mi)
- Time zone: UTC+8 (China Standard)
- Postal code: 043400
- Area code: 0357

Quwo County (Chinese: 曲沃县; pinyin: Qǔwò Xiàn) is a county under the administration of Linfen city, in southern Shanxi Province, China. The county has spans an area of 437 square kilometers, and has a population of 230,000 as of 2013.

== History ==
From 745 to 677 BC Quwo was a state that broke off from the State of Jin. Quwo County was first set up in 487 CE under the Northern Wei Empire during the Northern dynasties era. Since then, the county has not changed its name.

== Administrative divisions ==
Quwo County is divided into five towns and two townships: Lechang, Shicun, Qucun, Gaoxian, Licun, Beidong Township, and Yangtan Township. The county's government is located within Lechang.

== Climate ==
Climate data for Quwo, elevation 473 m (1,552 ft), (1991–2020 normals, extremes 1981–2010)
Month	Jan	Feb	Mar	Apr	May	Jun	Jul	Aug	Sep	Oct	Nov	Dec	Year
Record high °C (°F)	14.4 (57.9)	23.0 (73.4)	29.0 (84.2)	36.1 (97.0)	38.5 (101.3)	41.3 (106.3)	40.8 (105.4)	38.6 (101.5)	39.3 (102.7)	31.5 (88.7)	25.5 (77.9)	16.7 (62.1)	41.3 (106.3)
Mean daily maximum °C (°F)	4.6 (40.3)	9.3 (48.7)	15.8 (60.4)	22.6 (72.7)	27.6 (81.7)	32.0 (89.6)	32.7 (90.9)	30.8 (87.4)	26.2 (79.2)	20.0 (68.0)	12.5 (54.5)	5.8 (42.4)	20.0 (68.0)
Daily mean °C (°F)	−2.1 (28.2)	2.2 (36.0)	8.6 (47.5)	15.3 (59.5)	20.5 (68.9)	25.1 (77.2)	26.8 (80.2)	25.0 (77.0)	20.0 (68.0)	13.4 (56.1)	5.8 (42.4)	−0.7 (30.7)	13.3 (56.0)
Mean daily minimum °C (°F)	−7.1 (19.2)	−3.1 (26.4)	2.4 (36.3)	8.4 (47.1)	13.5 (56.3)	18.6 (65.5)	21.5 (70.7)	20.1 (68.2)	15.0 (59.0)	8.1 (46.6)	0.7 (33.3)	−5.4 (22.3)	7.7 (45.9)
Record low °C (°F)	−19.7 (−3.5)	−21.0 (−5.8)	−12.0 (10.4)	−4.0 (24.8)	1.1 (34.0)	8.5 (47.3)	14.3 (57.7)	11.4 (52.5)	3.0 (37.4)	−5.3 (22.5)	−14.1 (6.6)	−22.0 (−7.6)	−22.0 (−7.6)
Average precipitation mm (inches)	7.0 (0.28)	9.2 (0.36)	13.9 (0.55)	36.7 (1.44)	42.7 (1.68)	50.7 (2.00)	102.6 (4.04)	86.6 (3.41)	71.0 (2.80)	45.0 (1.77)	21.1 (0.83)	4.4 (0.17)	490.9 (19.33)
Average precipitation days (≥ 0.1 mm)	2.8	3.4	4.3	5.8	7.4	8.0	9.7	9.0	8.9	7.2	5.0	2.3	73.8
Average snowy days	3.6	3.1	0.9	0.1	0	0	0	0	0	0	1.2	2.6	11.5
Average relative humidity (%)	59	57	53	54	55	56	68	74	73	72	69	62	63
Mean monthly sunshine hours	143.8	156.8	191.0	219.6	236.1	220.3	216.2	199.4	165.2	162.4	148.6	145.9	2,205.3
Percentage possible sunshine	46	51	51	56	54	51	49	48	45	47	49	48	50
Source: China Meteorological Administration

== See also ==
- Huan Shu of Quwo
