= Shen Mengchen =

Chinese actress, host and model (born 1989)

- Born: June 13, 1989 (age 37); Jishou, Hunan, China
- Education: Hunan University
- Occupations: Actress, host, model
- Years active: 2008-present

Chinese name
- Traditional Chinese: 沈夢辰
- Simplified Chinese: 沈梦辰
Transcriptions
Standard Mandarin
- Hanyu Pinyin: Shěn Mèngchén

Shen Mengchen (simplified Chinese: 沈梦辰; traditional Chinese: 沈夢辰; pinyin: Shěn Mèngchén; born June 13, 1989) is a Chinese actress, host, and model of Tujia ethnicity.

== Early life and education ==
Shen was born in Jishou, Hunan on June 13, 1989. She graduated from Hunan University, where she majored in acting.

== Career ==
Shen first came to public attention in 2010 at the age of 19, appearing on Good Women.

She made her film debut in Fall in Love with You (2014), playing the love interest of Du Haitao's character. Her first main role in a television came with The Loving Home, alongside Yu Haoming, Pan Shiqi, and Li Tai.

On television in 2015, Shen had key supporting role in the romance television series The Wife's Lies.

She made a guest appearance as Meng Chen on Mad about You (2016). She starred opposite Wu Qian, Kim Tae-hwan and Fu Jia in My Amazing Boyfriend.

In 2017, Shen co-starred with Ma Ke and Qi Wei in the wuxia television series New Dragon Gate Inn, a remake of Raymond Lee's film New Dragon Gate Inn. That same year, she starred in a historical television series called Chong Er's Preach with Wang Longhua, Zhang Yishan, Baby Zhang, Madina Memet, Purba Rgyal, and Bobo Gan.

== Personal life ==
As of 2016, Shen has been in a relationship with variety show host and actor Du Haitao.

As of 18 February 2022, Shen is married to Du Haitao.

== Filmography ==
=== Film ===
Year	English title	Chinese title	Role	Notes
2014	Fall in Love with You	这个大叔不太囧	Zhou Meina	
2017	One Night, or Whole Life	识色，幸也	Kuang Jiajia	
2018	Capitulating to Innocent Girl			
2019	Where Is the Husband			

=== Television ===
Year	English title	Chinese title	Role	Notes
2014	The Loving Home	把爱带回家	Jin Yuanman	
2015		花样江湖	Master Meng	
2015	The Wife's Lies	妻子的谎言	Jiang Yishan	
2016	Mad about You	新婚公寓	Meng Chen	
2016	My Amazing Boyfriend	我的奇妙男友	Zhang Xuanxuan	
2019	Chong Er's Preach	重耳传	Ying Yue	
2020	Sisters Who Make Waves	乘风破浪的姐姐	cast member	
TBA	New Dragon Gate Inn	新龙门客栈	Qiu Moyan	

=== As host ===
Year	English title	Chinese title	Notes
2010	Good Women	好女人	
2010		潇湘风尚大典	
2010	Super Boy	快乐男声	
2011	New Year's Gala	百姓春晚	
2012		全力以赴	
2013	Hole In The Wall	墙来了	
2013	My Chinese Dream	我的中国梦	
2013	Lucky Elevator	幸运电梯	
2013	Box Opened with Surprises	开门大吉	
2013	The Generation Show	年代秀	
2015	I Am a Singer	我是歌手	
2016	The Unexpected	史料不及	
2016	Takes A Real Man	真正男子汉	
2017	Just For You	为你而来	
2017		零零大冒险	
