= Jia (singer) =

Chinese singer and actress

- 孟佳
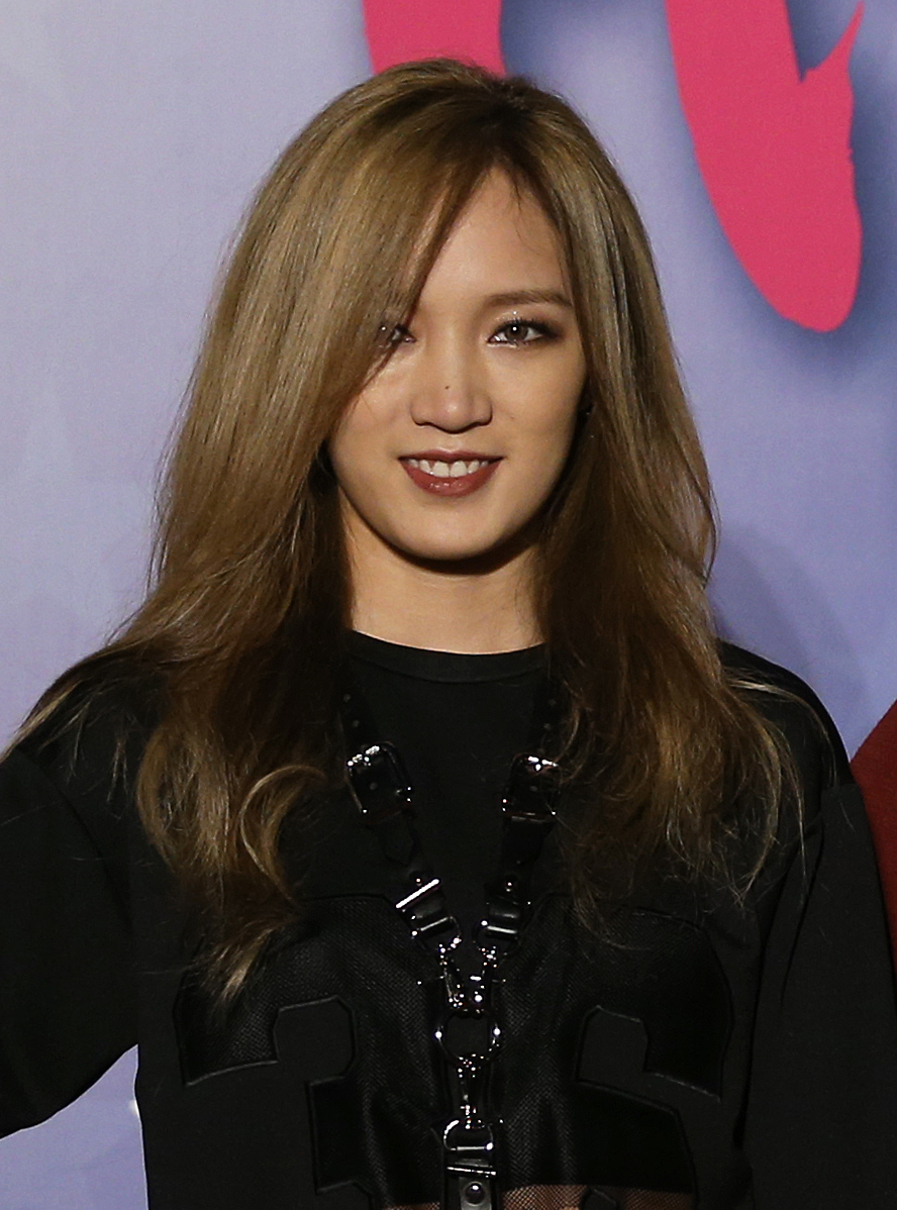
- Jia in October 2013
- Born: Meng Jia; February 3, 1989 (age 37); Loudi, Hunan, China
- Other name: Jia
- Education: Seoul Institute of the Arts
- Occupations: Singer; actress
- Musical career
- Genres: Dance-pop; C-pop; Mandopop; K-pop; R&B
- Instruments: Vocals
- Years active: 2010–present
- Labels: JYP; Banana Culture; Meng Jia Studio
- Formerly of: Miss A; X-SISTER; JYP Nation

Jia

Chinese name
- Chinese: 孟佳
Transcriptions
Standard Mandarin
- Hanyu Pinyin: Mèng Jiā

Korean name
- Hangul: 지아
Transcriptions
- Revised Romanization: Jia
- McCune–Reischauer: Chia

Meng Jia (Chinese: 孟佳; pinyin: Mèng Jiā; born February 3, 1989), simply known as Jia, is a Chinese singer and actress. She was a member of South Korean girl group Miss A until her contract expired in May 2016. After leaving Miss A, Meng Jia signed with Banana Culture Music in 2016 to pursue her solo career in China.

== Life and career ==
=== 1989–2009: Early life and career beginnings ===
Meng Jia was born on February 3, 1989, as the only child of her family. She attended school in Beijing and was recruited by JYP Entertainment in 2007. She later attended Seoul Institute of the Arts.

Meng Jia was initially part of the project group and the Chinese version of the Wonder Girls known as "Sisters", which was disbanded due to changes in members and trainees. In 2009, she appeared in 2PM's "My Color" music video, alongside Fei.

=== 2010–2016: Debut with Miss A and Early Solo Appearances ===
In 2010, Jia debuted as a member of the girl group Miss A. The 4-member group officially launched on July 1, 2010.

Jia made several appearances in music videos, including M&D's debut single "Close Ur Mouth," and had cameo roles in Dream High and Dream High 2. During Miss A's hiatus in 2012, Jia participated in fashion shows and magazines, performed with singer Ivy, and appeared on the variety show Let's Go Dream Team 2 in Vietnam.

Between 2013 and 2015, she co-hosted MBC's C-Radio radio show with Fei and Super Junior's Zhou Mi.

Her acting career began with a role in the 2014 Chinese television series One and a Half Summer alongside 2PM's Nichkhun, and she starred in the 2015 Chinese film The Third Way of Love, alongside Song Seung-heon and Liu Yifei.

Her final album with Miss A, Colors, was released on March 30, 2015. She departed from both Miss A and JYP Entertainment in May 2016 after deciding not to renew her contract.

=== 2016–present: Solo Career ===
On June 8, 2016, Meng Jia signed with Banana Culture Music to pursue a solo career in China. Her debut solo single, "Drip," was released on November 18, 2016, followed by "Who's That Girl" on January 3, 2017, which charted at No. 6 on Billboard China. She released "Candy" on April 7, 2017. Jia won the "Breakthrough Female Artist of the Year" award at the 5th Annual V Chart Awards on April 8, 2017. Her fourth single, "Mood," was released on December 19, 2017, featuring Jackson Wang from Got7.

Meng Jia continued her solo career with the release of her fifth single, "Weapon," on March 20, 2018, and her sixth single, "Free," on June 4, 2018. Her seventh single, "Liwai (例外)," was announced in September 2018.

In 2019, she left Banana Culture Entertainment and continued her solo activities. In 2020, she joined Hunan TV's reality show "Sisters Who Makes Waves." In the finale, she won the "2020 Most Loved Treasure Sister" award and placed third, joining the group "X-SISTER."

In January 2021, Meng Jia released her single "Glass Wall (透明空間)." On June 26 of the same year, she launched her personal brand, Random Experiment (Re 隨機試驗). Later, on November 26, she introduced her first Chinese-style dance single, "Oriental (東方)."

On June 30, 2023, Meng Jia held her debut solo concert in Guangzhou, where she performed new tracks from her second EP, "JIALAND."

== Discography ==
=== Extended plays ===
List of extended plays
Title	Details
JIA	Released: January 24, 2017; Label: JYP Entertainment; Formats: CD, digital download
JIALAND	Released: June 30, 2023; Label: Youjia Culture; Formats: CD, digital download

=== Singles ===
Title	Year	Peak chart positions		Album
Title	Year	CHN TME UNI	CHN V Chart	Album
"Drip" (給我乖)	2016	—	8	JIA
"Who's That Girl" (她是谁)	2017	—	6	JIA
"Candy" (糖果)	2017	—	14	JIA
"MOOD" (with Jackson Wang)	2017	—	6	Non-album singles
"Weapon (Chinese Ver)" (炎)	2018	—	—	Non-album singles
"Free"	2018	—	3	Non-album singles
"Liwai" (例外)	2018	—	—	Non-album singles
"Waiting For A Empty Car" (等空车的人)	2018	—	—	Non-album singles
"Glass Wall" (透明空间) (feat. Vava)	2021	17	—	Non-album singles
"The East" (东方)	2021	53	—	Non-album singles
“Door Unlocked" (门没锁)	2022	27	—	Youth Reset Plan Season 5: Reply 1999 (青春重置计划5 请回答1999)
"No Thanks (Parallel Version)"	2022	—	—	Non-album single
"KNOCKOUT"	2023	—	—	JIALAND
"GOOD GOOD LOVE"	2023	—	—	JIALAND
“Twenty, Thirty" (二十,三十)	2023	—	—	Our Folk Town Issue 1 (我们的民谣小镇 第1期)
"Star Light" (星光)	2023	—	—	Non-album singles
"Accurate Pronunciation and Smooth Singing" (字正腔圆)	2024	—	—	Non-album singles

=== Promotional singles ===
Title	Year	Language
"Weapon"	2018	English

=== OSTs ===
Title	Year	Peak chart positions	Album
Title	Year	CHN TME UNI	Album
"Wherever"	2019	—	Le crocodile le pluvian OST
"Time Flies" (来过) (with Fox Hu)	2020	64	Just a Breath Away OST
"Chasing My Dream" (我和我追逐的夢) (with Huang Ling, Wan Qian, Baby Zhang & Zhu Jing)	2021	—	Endgame OST
"Run Without Care" (瀟灑走一回)	2021	—	Our Times OST
"Leaning of Love" (天秤倾斜之后)	2022	—	Wife's Choice OST
"Sweet Time" (甜蜜時光)	2022	—	Mom Wow OST
"You Understand Me, I Understand You" (你懂我 我懂你)	2023	—	Ode To Joy 4 OST
"Warm Light" (暖光)	2023	—	The Outsider OST
"Continued Song" (续长歌) (with Zhang Yuan)	2023	—	The Legend of Anle OST
"Emotion Remote Control" (心情遥控器) (with Xu Junshuo)	2023	—	Only For Love OST
"Them Today" (今天的她們)	2024	—	Fry Me to the Moon OST
"Something Worth Saving"	2024	56	The Tale of Rose OST

=== Albums appearances ===
Title	Year	Artist(s)	Album
"Because of You" (너 때문에)	2013	Baek A-yeon	A Good Girl
"IKYK"	2016	Vanness Wu	MWHYB
"You and I are Kings" (你我皆王者)	2021	Dany Lee, Gina Jin, Yisa Yu & Baby Zhang	You and I are Kings OST (你我皆王者)
“The Secret of a Bowl of Pink" (一碗粉的秘密)	2021		It Sounds Incredible OST (听说很好吃)
"Chinese Dream, My Dream (Live)" (中国梦·我的梦 (Live))	2022	Huang Xuan, Victoria Song, Xiao Zhan, Song Yi, Ren Jialun, Yang Yang, Yang Mi, Huang Jue, Zhou Shen, Mao Buyi, Dilireba, BonBon Girls 303, INTO1, Jason Zhang, Miriam Yeung, Gina Jin, Zhang Wanyi, Xiao Shunyao, Jordan Chan, Julian Cheung, Jerry Lamb, & Edmond Leung	Chinese Dream, My Dream (中国梦·我的梦)

== Filmography ==
=== Film ===
Year	Title	Role
2015	The Third Way of Love	Xiao Yue
2019	Friend Zone	Chinese Singer
2019	Undercover Punch and Gun	Phantom

=== Drama ===
Year	Title	Network	Role	Note
2011	Dream High	KBS2	Flash mob dancer	Cameo (Episode 16)
2012	Dream High 2	KBS2	Herself	Cameo (Episode 15)
2013	One and a Half Summer	CJ E&M	Song Qing	
2015	L.U.V Collage	Gateway To Korea	Ai-ling	

=== Reality shows ===
Year	Title	Network	Role	Notes
2015	Youth Trainee	ZRTG: Zhejiang Television	Herself	Contestant
2018	Hot Blood Dance Crew	iQiyi	Herself	Contestant
2020	Sisters Who Make Waves	Mango TV	Herself	Contestant
2020	Lady Land	Hunan Television	Herself	Contestant

=== Radio ===
Year	Title	Network	Role	Notes
2013–2015	Idols, True Colors	MBC C-Radio	MC	with Fei and Zhou Mi

=== Music videos ===
Year	Song title	Album
2016	"Drip"	JIA
2017	"Who's That Girl"	JIA
2017	"Candy"	JIA
2017	"#Mood"	Non-album singles
2018	"Weapon"	Non-album singles
2018	"Free"	Non-album singles
2021	"Glass Wall"	Non-album singles
2022	"The East"	Non-album singles
2023	"KNOCKOUT"	JIALAND
2023	"GOOD GOOD LOVE"	JIALAND

== Awards and nominations ==
Year	Event	Award	Category	Result	Ref
2017	The 5th YinYueTai V-Chart Awards	Breakthrough Artist of the Year	Female	Won	
