= Sisters Who Make Waves season 1 =

Chinese reality television show

- Series logo
- Traditional Chinese: 乘風破浪的姐姐
- Simplified Chinese: 乘风破浪的姐姐
- Literal meaning: Sisters who ride the winds and break the waves
- Hanyu Pinyin: Chéngfēngpòlàng De Jiějiě
- Genre: Reality
- Directed by: Yan Ji
- Creative director: Wu Mengzhi
- Presented by: Huang Xiaoming
- Country of origin: China
- Original language: Mandarin
- No. of seasons: 4
- No. of episodes: 13

Production
- Camera setup: Multi-camera
- Running time: 94–208 minutes
- Production company: Mango TV

Original release
- Network: Mango TV
- Release: June 12 – September 4, 2020

Related
- Sisters Who Make Waves season 2 (2021)

Sisters Who Make Waves (Chinese: 乘风破浪的姐姐; pinyin: Chéngfēngpòlàng De Jiějiě) season 1 is a 2020 Chinese reality television show that was broadcast on Mango TV from June 12 to September 4, 2020. It features 30 female celebrities over 30 years old who must compete to debut in a seven–member girl group.

== Concept ==
Touting the catchphrase "Thirty dark horses, return to youth", Sisters Who Make Waves follows the general formula idol group reality shows like Produce 101 and Idol Producer, but with the twist that participants are already well–known and veteran celebrities and are all aged 30 and above, with an average age of 35+. The contestants are to live with each other for 3 months while partaking in intense training. Huang Xiaoming is the official presenter of the final group. Additional cast members include Du Hua as female group manager, Huo Wenxi as general counselor, Zhao Zhao as music producer and Chen Qiyuan as stage producer. After the show's end, the winning group starred in "Lady Land" which followed the behind-the-scenes journey to forming a group.

== Contestants ==
The contestants' English name is used in the list. If the English name is unknown, the pinyin version of the Chinese name is used. Top 7 contestants debuted as X-SISTER on the show's finale on 4 September 2020, but the announcement of disbandment was made on 1 January 2021, as members resume their own entertainment activities.

Contestants Names	Chinese names	Age	Occupation	Results
A Duo (b.1978)	阿朵	42	Singer	Unsuccessfully Debuted**
Isabelle Huang (b. 1987)	黄龄	33	Singer	Successfully Debuted as X-SISTER
Lisi Danny (b. 1990)	李斯丹妮	30	Singer/Rapper	Successfully Debuted as X-SISTER
Shen Mengchen (b. 1989)	沈梦辰	31	TV Host	Eliminated in 2nd Performance*
Xu Fei (b. 1985)	许飞	35	Singer	Eliminated in 1st Performance
Alina Zhang (b. 1981)	张萌	39	Actress	Eliminated in 4th Performance
Hai Lu (b. 1984)	海陆	36	Actress	Eliminated in 1st Performance
Baby Zhang (b. 1989)	张含韵	31	Singer	Unsuccessfully Debuted
Michelle Bai (b. 1986)	白冰	34	Actress	Eliminated in 5th Performance
Huang Shengyi (b. 1983)	黄圣依	37	Actress	Eliminated in 5th Performance
Wang Feifei (b. 1987)	王霏霏	33	Singer	Unsuccessfully Debuted
Annie Yi (b. 1968)	伊能静	52	Singer	Unsuccessfully Debuted
Zhang Yuqi (b. 1987)	张雨绮	33	Actress	Successfully Debuted as X-SISTER
Lan Yingying (b. 1990)	蓝盈莹	30	Actress	Unsuccessfully Debuted
Zhu Jing (b. 1988)	朱婧汐	32	Singer–Songwriter	Eliminated in 1st Performance*
Adia Chen (b. 1971)	陈松伶	49	Singer	Eliminated in 1st Performance
Gina Jin (b. 1990)	金晨	30	Actress	Unsuccessfully Debuted
Meng Jia (b. 1989)	孟佳	31	Singer	Successfully Debuted as X-SISTER***
Wang Likun (b. 1985)	王丽坤	35	Actress	Eliminated in 3rd Performance
Yisa Yu (b. 1983)	郁可唯	37	Singer	Successfully Debuted as X-SISTER
Yumiko Cheng (b. 1981)	郑希怡	39	Singer	Unsuccessfully Debuted
Regina Wan (b. 1982)	万茜	38	Actress	Successfully Debuted as X-SISTER
Della Ding (b. 1982)	丁当	38	Singer	Eliminated in 2nd Performance
Kym Jin (b. 1981)	金莎	39	Singer	Eliminated in 3rd Performance*
Ning Jing (b. 1972)	宁静	48	Actress	Successfully Debuted as X-SISTER
Wang Zhi (b. 1983)	王智	37	Actress	Eliminated in 1st Performance*
Cindy Yen (b. 1986)	袁咏琳	34	Singer	Eliminated in 4th Performance
Christy Chung (b. 1970)	钟丽缇	50	Actress	Eliminated in 2nd Performance
Wu Xin (b. 1983)	吴昕	37	TV Host	Eliminated in 4th Performance*
Liu Yun (b. 1982)	刘芸	38	Actress	Eliminated in 1st Performance

Key
Eliminated in 1st Performance	Eliminated in 2nd Performance	Eliminated in 3rd Performance	Eliminated in 4th Performance	Eliminated in 5th Performance
Unsuccessfully Debuted	Successfully Debuted as X-SISTER			

Notes:

- Most contestants have more than one occupation. Their main occupation is the one listed.

*Part of the revival group in the fifth performance

**Eliminated in 2nd Performance, Successfully revived in 5th performance

***Eliminated in 3rd Performance, Successfully Revived in 5th performance

== Episodes ==
=== Episode 1 (12 June 2020) ===
In the first episode, 30 contestants performed a personal preliminary stage and were rated by three mentors: personal traits and group potential were scored by Du Hua, vocal performance was scored by Zhao Zhao, and stage performance was scored by Chen Qiyuan.

==== Results ====
Initial evaluation stage
Contestant	Song (original singer)	Initial stage score (25 pts each, total score of 100 pts)					Grouping
Contestant	Song (original singer)	Personality	Vocals	Group potential	Stage	Total score	Grouping
Adia Chan	"餓狼傳說" (Jacky Cheung)	17	20	16	20	73	Vocal group
Michelle Bai	"騎士精神" (Jolin Tsai)	21	18	22	18	79	Dance group
Cindy Yen	"爱是黑白" (Cindy Yen)	20	23	20	20	83	Dance group
Huang Shengyi	"自己的幸福" (Huang Shengyi)	23	18	24	15	80	Dance group
Della Ding	"我是一只小小鸟" (Zhao Chuan)	17	23	15	20	75	Dance group
Kym Jin	"少年" (Meng Ran)	18	16	18	16	68	X card
Gina Jin	"Hello" (Wang Feifei, Jackson Wang)	21	15	22	22	80	
Liu Yun	"我们的爱" (F.I.R, Kim Jimun)	20	16	20	18	74	Dance group
Wang Likun	"我们没有在一起" (Rene Liu)	19	20	18	15	72	Dance group
Hai Lu	"说爱你" (Jolin Tsai, Liu Zhijia)	18	16	18	16	68	X card
Christy Chung	"舞娘" (Jolin Tsai)	19	23	20	16	78	
Lan Yingying	"别找我麻烦" (Tanya Chua)	23	22	24	22	91	Dance group
Isabelle Huang	"芒种" (Tengger, Zhao Fangjing)	23	23	22	21	89	
Zhang Yuqi	"粉红色的回忆" (Han Baoyi, Jenvent Ng)	18	22	16	16	72	X card
Xu Fei	"不红" (Xu Fei)	21	19	17	18	75	
Zhu Jing	"Cure" (Zhu Jing)	18	20	17	21	76	
Wang Zhi	"刀剑如梦" (Wakin Chau)	17	14	17	18	66	
A Duo	"扯谎哥" (A Duo)	20	23	18	18	79	
Yisa Yu	"躲起来" (Yisa Yu)	21	24	19	21	85	
Shen Mengchen	"壁花小姐" (Aya Liu)	23	19	21	23	86	
Zhang Meng	"但愿人长久" (Faye Wang, Jocelyn How, Teresa Teng)	20	20	18	19	77	
Regina Wan	"敬你" (Xu Fei)	20	20	20	17	77	
Ning Jing	"吻别前的那片海" (Ning Jing)	22	23	19	20	84	
Li Si Dan Ni	"李扯火" (Li Si Dan Ni)	23	18	23	23	87	
Meng Jia	"给我乖" (Meng Jia)	23	20	22	22	87	Dance group
Wang Feifei	"Hello" (Wang Feifei)	23	18	23	20	84	Dance group
Yumiko Cheng	"Bad Boy" (A-Mei)	21	22	20	21	84	
Annie Yi	"你说要我爱你" (Annie Yi)	18	21	17	17	74	
Baby Zhang	"Wonderful U" (Agatha Kong)	20	22	19	18	79	
Wu Xin	"爱" (Little Tigers)	20	15	19	20	74	

=== Episode 2 (19 June 2020) ===
The contestants are then asked to pick one of six songs for their first group evaluations, with the people with the highest scores allowed to pick first. The six songs are "兰花草" by YinShia, "推开世界的门" by Faith Yang, "Beautiful Love" by Tanya Chua, "得不到的爱情" by Yao Lee, "艾瑞巴迪" by New Pants, and "大碗宽面" by Kris Wu.

Each of the six groups then practice for their respective song, with the performance order determined by the initial stage results.

=== Episode 3 (26 June 2020) ===
Among the three–member, five–member, and seven–member performance pairings, the six contestants who have the lowest individual votes in the losing groups would be eliminated. During the performance, 500 audience vote between the two competing groups for each pairing. Wang Zhi, Adia Chen, Zhu Jing, Hai Lu, Liu Yun, and Xu Fei were temporarily eliminated.

==== Results ====
The first round of performances
#	Performance songs (original singer)	Member	Ensemble vote	Rank	Audience likes	result
Opening with " 明天的烦恼交给明天 - 乘风破浪版 " (original: Mr. Miss) with all 30 contestants
1	"Orchid Grass (兰花草)" (YinShia)	Ning Jing	408	1	106	Pass
1	"Orchid Grass (兰花草)" (YinShia)	Cindy Yen	408	1	52	Pass
1	"Orchid Grass (兰花草)" (YinShia)	A Duo	408	1	42	Pass
2	"Push the door of the world (推开世界的门)" (Faith Yang)	Annie Yi	91	6	48	Pass
2	"Push the door of the world (推开世界的门)" (Faith Yang)	Wang Likun	91	6	40	Pass
2	"Push the door of the world (推开世界的门)" (Faith Yang)	Wang Zhi	91	6	3	Eliminated
3	"Beautiful Love" (Bi Xia, Tanya Chua)	Wan Qian	94	5	131	Pass
3	"Beautiful Love" (Bi Xia, Tanya Chua)	Adia Chen	94	5	30	Eliminated
3	"Beautiful Love" (Bi Xia, Tanya Chua)	Zhu Jing	94	5	30	Eliminated
3	"Beautiful Love" (Bi Xia, Tanya Chua)	Kym Jin	94	5	34	Pass
3	"Beautiful Love" (Bi Xia, Tanya Chua)	Hai Lu	94	5	24	Eliminated
4	"Unreachable Love (得不到的爱情)" (Yao Lee)	Lan Yingying	402	2	63	Pass
4	"Unreachable Love (得不到的爱情)" (Yao Lee)	Isabelle Huang	402	2	33	Pass
4	"Unreachable Love (得不到的爱情)" (Yao Lee)	Yumiko Cheng	402	2	39	Pass
4	"Unreachable Love (得不到的爱情)" (Yao Lee)	Michelle Bai	402	2	45	Pass
4	"Unreachable Love (得不到的爱情)" (Yao Lee)	Christy Chung	402	2	46	Pass
5	"Everybody (艾瑞巴迪)" (New Pants)	Liu Yun	178	4	Unpublished	Eliminated
5	"Everybody (艾瑞巴迪)" (New Pants)	Wu Xin	178	4	36	Pass
5	"Everybody (艾瑞巴迪)" (New Pants)	Xu Fei	178	4	Unpublished	Eliminated
5	"Everybody (艾瑞巴迪)" (New Pants)	Della Ding	178	4	44	Pass
5	"Everybody (艾瑞巴迪)" (New Pants)	Huang Shengyi	178	4	54	Pass
5	"Everybody (艾瑞巴迪)" (New Pants)	Zhang Yuqi	178	4	68	Pass
5	"Everybody (艾瑞巴迪)" (New Pants)	Zhang Meng	178	4	38	Pass
6	"Big Bowl, Thick Noodle (大碗宽面)" (Kris Wu)	Li Si Dan Ni	311	3	60	Pass
6	"Big Bowl, Thick Noodle (大碗宽面)" (Kris Wu)	Meng Jia	311	3	45	Pass
6	"Big Bowl, Thick Noodle (大碗宽面)" (Kris Wu)	Shen Mengchen	311	3	57	Pass
6	"Big Bowl, Thick Noodle (大碗宽面)" (Kris Wu)	Yisa Yu	311	3	85	Pass
6	"Big Bowl, Thick Noodle (大碗宽面)" (Kris Wu)	Wang Feifei	311	3	70	Pass
6	"Big Bowl, Thick Noodle (大碗宽面)" (Kris Wu)	Gina Jin	311	3	62	Pass
6	"Big Bowl, Thick Noodle (大碗宽面)" (Kris Wu)	Baby Zhang	311	3	29	Pass

=== Episode 4 (3 July 2020) ===
For the fourth round of implementations, the remaining sisters were divided into seven groups of eight. The performance order is decided based on the total of the first–round audience favorite of each group member. The groups practice for the performances, with pre-performances judged beforehand, and the result determines which team will have an advantage in choosing their order of performance.

=== Episode 5 (10 July 2020) ===
As the second round performance commences, and the audience votes determined the final rankings of each team. The top three teams earned "safe team" status and all of its members moved on to the next round. Among the other five "dangerous teams", the four least popular sisters faced elimination, regardless of teams. In the end, Christy Chung, A Duo, Della Ding, and Shen Mengchen were eliminated.

==== Results ====
The second round of performances
#	Performance song (original singer)	Member	Ensemble vote	Rank	Audience likes	result
Opening with "我怎么这么好看 (Why am I so Beautiful)" (original: Wowkie Zhang) with Huang Shengyi, Zhang Yuqi, Della Ding, Cindy Yen, Wang Feifei, Yumiko Cheng, Meng Jia, Lan Yingying
1	"What kind of music does he have (管他什么音乐)" (Mavis Fan)	Zhang Yuqi (L)	433	1	113	Pass
1	"What kind of music does he have (管他什么音乐)" (Mavis Fan)	Wang Likun	433	1	75	Pass
1	"What kind of music does he have (管他什么音乐)" (Mavis Fan)	Li Si Da Ni	433	1	55	Pass
2	"This is because we can feel pain (这是因为我们能感到疼痛)" (Tizzy Bac)	Meng Jia (L)	386	3	32	Pass
2	"This is because we can feel pain (这是因为我们能感到疼痛)" (Tizzy Bac)	Baby Zhang	386	3	50	Pass
2	"This is because we can feel pain (这是因为我们能感到疼痛)" (Tizzy Bac)	Gina Jin	386	3	91	Pass
3	"Animalistic Feelings After Love (相爱后动物感伤)" (A-Mei)	Cindy Yen (L)	291	7	80	Pass
3	"Animalistic Feelings After Love (相爱后动物感伤)" (A-Mei)	Christy Chung	291	7	Unpublished	Eliminated
3	"Animalistic Feelings After Love (相爱后动物感伤)" (A-Mei)	A Duo	291	7	Unpublished	Eliminated
4	"Unstoppable (仰世而来)" (A Si)	Della Ding (L)	289	8	Unpublished	Eliminated
4	"Unstoppable (仰世而来)" (A Si)	Kym Jin	289	8	43	Pass
4	"Unstoppable (仰世而来)" (A Si)	Michelle Bai	289	8	39	Pass
5	"Girls and Quartet (女孩儿与四重奏)" (Ding Wei)	Huang Shengyi (L)	348	6	42	Pass
5	"Girls and Quartet (女孩儿与四重奏)" (Ding Wei)	Annie Yi	348	6	63	Pass
5	"Girls and Quartet (女孩儿与四重奏)" (Ding Wei)	Zhang Meng	348	6	43	Pass
6	"FLOW" (Khalil Fong feat. Leehom Wang)	Ning Jing (L)	420	2	142	Pass
6	"FLOW" (Khalil Fong feat. Leehom Wang)	Yumiko Cheng	420	2	40	Pass
6	"FLOW" (Khalil Fong feat. Leehom Wang)	Yisa Yu	420	2	84	Pass
7	"Exhausted, I ran towards you (用尽我的一切奔向你)" (Bibi Zhou)	Lan Yingying (L)	367	5	63	Pass
7	"Exhausted, I ran towards you (用尽我的一切奔向你)" (Bibi Zhou)	Wu Xin	367	5	69	Pass
7	"Exhausted, I ran towards you (用尽我的一切奔向你)" (Bibi Zhou)	Isabelle Huang	367	5	47	Pass
8	"Manta" (Lexie Liu)	Wang Feifei (L)	382	4	52	Pass
8	"Manta" (Lexie Liu)	Wan Qian	382	4	140	Pass
8	"Manta" (Lexie Liu)	Shen Mengchen	382	4	Unpublished	Eliminated
"L" represents the leader/center member

=== Episode 6 (17 July 2020) ===
After the second round of performance, the three most popular sisters from the audience and the last round of safety team leader became captains of this round. This round of performance was divided into four groups of five people. At the same time, a personal battle was added to opening performance, and each group sent a sister to participate, they were Meng Jia, Wang Feifei, Li Si Dan Ni, and Baby Zhang. The four sister representatives from each group challenged four different dance styles (Whacking, Power Jazz, Animation, African Dance) incorporated into the theme song of the show "Ms. Priceless". The votes garnered from their individual performances were added to the team battle to determine their rankings.

=== Episode 7 (24 July 2020) ===
In this performance, the team with the highest total votes will have all members being safe from elimination. With the teams in danger, the lowest individual votes sister from each team would be eliminated. Team Gentlewoman had the highest total votes, therefore all of the members were safe from elimination. Using this rule, Kym Jin (team "Rainbow Beats"), Meng Jia (team "In the Mood for Love"), and Wang Likun (team "Beauty Wild Road) were eliminated.

The third round of performances
#	Performance songs (original singer)	Member	Ensemble votes	Individual votes	Rank	Total votes	result
Individual battle – "Ms. Priceless" (program theme song, original singer: Chris Lee); Wang Feifei, Meng Jia, Li Si Dan Ni, Baby Zhang
1	"Gentlewoman" (A-Lin)	Wan Qian (L)	417	145	1	562	Pass
1	"Gentlewoman" (A-Lin)	Li Si Dan Ni	417	145	1	562	Pass
1	"Gentlewoman" (A-Lin)	Cindy Yen	417	145	1	562	Pass
1	"Gentlewoman" (A-Lin)	Isabelle Huang	417	145	1	562	Pass
1	"Gentlewoman" (A-Lin)	Gina Jin	417	145	1	562	Pass
2	"Rainbow Beats (彩虹节拍)" (Easy Yan, Soap Bacteria, Zhao Fangjing, Yin Que Shi Ting)	Zhang Yuqi (L)	210	147	3	357	Pass
2	"Rainbow Beats (彩虹节拍)" (Easy Yan, Soap Bacteria, Zhao Fangjing, Yin Que Shi Ting)	Baby Zhang	210	147	3	357	Pass
2	"Rainbow Beats (彩虹节拍)" (Easy Yan, Soap Bacteria, Zhao Fangjing, Yin Que Shi Ting)	Kym Jin	210	147	3	357	Eliminated
2	"Rainbow Beats (彩虹节拍)" (Easy Yan, Soap Bacteria, Zhao Fangjing, Yin Que Shi Ting)	Lan Yingying	210	147	3	357	Pass
2	"Rainbow Beats (彩虹节拍)" (Easy Yan, Soap Bacteria, Zhao Fangjing, Yin Que Shi Ting)	Annie Yi	210	147	3	357	Pass
3	"In the Mood for Love (花样年华)" (Tony Leung Chiu-Wai, Wu Enqi)	Meng Jia (L)	262	78	4	340	Eliminated
3	"In the Mood for Love (花样年华)" (Tony Leung Chiu-Wai, Wu Enqi)	Zhang Meng	262	78	4	340	Pass
3	"In the Mood for Love (花样年华)" (Tony Leung Chiu-Wai, Wu Enqi)	Yumiko Cheng	262	78	4	340	Pass
3	"In the Mood for Love (花样年华)" (Tony Leung Chiu-Wai, Wu Enqi)	Wu Xin	262	78	4	340	Pass
3	"In the Mood for Love (花样年华)" (Tony Leung Chiu-Wai, Wu Enqi)	Huang Shengyi	262	78	4	340	Pass
4	"Beauty Wild Road (人美路子野)" (Wang Ziyu)	Ning Jing (L)	419	125	2	544	Pass
4	"Beauty Wild Road (人美路子野)" (Wang Ziyu)	Yisa Yu	419	125	2	544	Pass
4	"Beauty Wild Road (人美路子野)" (Wang Ziyu)	Michelle Bai	419	125	2	544	Pass
4	"Beauty Wild Road (人美路子野)" (Wang Ziyu)	Wang Likun	419	125	2	544	Eliminated
4	"Beauty Wild Road (人美路子野)" (Wang Ziyu)	Wang Feifei	419	125	2	544	Pass
"L" represents the group leader

=== Episode 8 (31 July 2020) ===
For the fourth round performance, the sisters were sorted into two teams of five and a team of seven. The teams configurations remain largely unchanged. As their outstanding performance in the previous round earned them a "safe team" status, Wan Qian's team had the privilege of first pick, and they collectively decided to stay together for this round. Lan Yingying crossed over to fill Wang Likun's space in the previously Ning Jing-led group (led this round by Yisa Yu), while the rest of the sisters automatically form a team of seven, led by Zhang Yuqi.

This round includes two parts, a team performance, and a band collaboration with the popular Chinese pop-punk band, New Pants.

=== Episode 9 (7 August 2020) ===
The fourth round of performances
#	Performing songs (original singer)	Member	Ensemble votes	Individual votes	Total votes	Audience likes	result
1 4	"New species (新物种)" (Chris Lee) "Stop asking me what is disco + walking tractor (别再问我什么是迪斯科+手扶拖拉机斯基)" (Zhang Qiang)	Wan Qian (L)	458	402	860	225	Pass
1 4	"New species (新物种)" (Chris Lee) "Stop asking me what is disco + walking tractor (别再问我什么是迪斯科+手扶拖拉机斯基)" (Zhang Qiang)	Li Si Dan Ni	458	402	860	84	Pass
1 4	"New species (新物种)" (Chris Lee) "Stop asking me what is disco + walking tractor (别再问我什么是迪斯科+手扶拖拉机斯基)" (Zhang Qiang)	Cindy Yen	458	402	860	Unpublished	Eliminated
1 4	"New species (新物种)" (Chris Lee) "Stop asking me what is disco + walking tractor (别再问我什么是迪斯科+手扶拖拉机斯基)" (Zhang Qiang)	Isabelle Huang	458	402	860	41	Pass
1 4	"New species (新物种)" (Chris Lee) "Stop asking me what is disco + walking tractor (别再问我什么是迪斯科+手扶拖拉机斯基)" (Zhang Qiang)	Gina Jin	458	402	860	113	Pass
2 5	"My new swag (我的新衣)" (Vava) "Dragon Tiger Man Dan (虎人丹龙)" (New Pants)	Zhang Yuqi (L)	391	418	809	189	Pass
2 5	"My new swag (我的新衣)" (Vava) "Dragon Tiger Man Dan (虎人丹龙)" (New Pants)	Baby Zhang	391	418	809	143	Pass
2 5	"My new swag (我的新衣)" (Vava) "Dragon Tiger Man Dan (虎人丹龙)" (New Pants)	Annie Yi	391	418	809	78	Pass
2 5	"My new swag (我的新衣)" (Vava) "Dragon Tiger Man Dan (虎人丹龙)" (New Pants)	Zhang Meng	391	418	809	Unpublished	Eliminated
2 5	"My new swag (我的新衣)" (Vava) "Dragon Tiger Man Dan (虎人丹龙)" (New Pants)	Yumiko Cheng	391	418	809	103	Pass
2 5	"My new swag (我的新衣)" (Vava) "Dragon Tiger Man Dan (虎人丹龙)" (New Pants)	Wu Xin	391	418	809	Unpublished	Eliminated
2 5	"My new swag (我的新衣)" (Vava) "Dragon Tiger Man Dan (虎人丹龙)" (New Pants)	Huang Shengyi	391	418	809	33	Pass
3 6	"Catfight (傲娇)" (A-Mei ft. Lala Hsu & Eve Ai) "People who don't have ideals are not sad (没有理想的人不伤心)" (New Pants)	Yisa Yu (L)	436	427	863	53	Pass
3 6	"Catfight (傲娇)" (A-Mei ft. Lala Hsu & Eve Ai) "People who don't have ideals are not sad (没有理想的人不伤心)" (New Pants)	Ning Jing	436	427	863	209	Pass
3 6	"Catfight (傲娇)" (A-Mei ft. Lala Hsu & Eve Ai) "People who don't have ideals are not sad (没有理想的人不伤心)" (New Pants)	Michelle Bai	436	427	863	27	Pass
3 6	"Catfight (傲娇)" (A-Mei ft. Lala Hsu & Eve Ai) "People who don't have ideals are not sad (没有理想的人不伤心)" (New Pants)	Lan Yingying	436	427	863	65	Pass
3 6	"Catfight (傲娇)" (A-Mei ft. Lala Hsu & Eve Ai) "People who don't have ideals are not sad (没有理想的人不伤心)" (New Pants)	Wang Feifei	436	427	863	70	Pass
"L" represents the group leader

After the votes for both performances were combined, the Yisa Yu's group came up on top, earning "safe team" status, which meant all her group members automatically qualify for the next round. Wan Qian and Zhang Yuqi's group members faced elimination based on individual popularity votes. For this round, three sisters, namely Cindy Yen, Zhang Meng, and Wu Xin were eliminated.

The group configurations underwent reshuffling for the final time, meaning the groups were to be formed will stay the same for the rest of the competition. The group configuration for the next round was two seven–member groups. The selection of leaders for this round was based on sisters' votes, two sisters with the highest number of votes will automatically become captains of the two groups. After the vote count, Ning Jing became the first leader with the highest number of votes, while Lisi Dani and Wang Feifei were tied at second place. After taking into account individual popularity votes, Li Si Dan Ni became the second leader.

The other sisters were split into two groups to meet the two new leaders, Ning Jing and Li Si Dan Ni, for a quick chat. Both the leaders and sisters can express their intention as to whether or not they would like to join their groups. An obvious popular choice for both groups was Wang Feifei, due to her incredible dance skills and vast girl–group experience, which led both leaders begging for her to pick their groups. The final group configurations are:

Group 1: Ning Jing (Leader), Wang Feifei, Michelle Bai, Lan Yingying, Huang Shengyi, Yisa Yu, and Yumiko Cheng

Group 2: Li Si Dan Ni (Leader), Wan Qian, Gina Jin, Baby Zhang, Zhang Yuqi, Isabelle Huang, and Annie Yi

Other than these two groups, there will be a third group which consists of 7 sisters who were eliminated, but voted back by netizens. Together they form a "revival group" that will later pose a formidable challenge to the two existing groups.

=== Episode 10 (14 August 2020) ===
The fifth round of performance saw a change in format as the show welcomed back a 7–member revival group. The 7 members were picked from a list of sisters who were eliminated in previous rounds, based on netizens vote, they are:

A Duo (Leader), Meng Jia, Shen Mengchen, Wu Xin, Jin Sha, Zhu Jingxi, and Wang Zhi.

This round of performance was divided into two sections. First is an individual battle performance, the show producers provided a list of seven different songs and each member of each group must perform one of them. Li Si Dan Ni and Ning Jing's groups are considered to be Championship Candidate Groups and they will battle against the revival group. In this round, Two teams will take turns for the next song (except order 7), and the sisters from the revival group have the privilege to pick who they'd like to challenge from the Championship Candidate Groups. If the revival group wins this battle on total group votes, they are entitled to a revival spot. Otherwise, they would indicate failure of revival this round, which means only one sister from revival group who had the most votes in individual battle still have chance to revive if the revival team indicate failure of revival for the whole performance.

Fifth round individual battle performance
Order	Song	Li Si Dan Ni Group	Ning Jing Group	Revival Group	Champion Candidate Group Votes	Revival Group Votes
1	屋顶着火 "Roof on Fire" (宋茜 Victoria Song)	Zhang Yuqi	Michelle Bai	Shen Mengchen	149 (Michelle Bai)	331
2	皮囊 "Skin Bag" (萧敬腾 Jam Hsiao)	Zhang Hanyun	Lan Yingying	Meng Jia	142 (Zhang Hanyun)	343
3	驰 Timelapse (胡梦周 CORSAK)	Annie Yi	Ning Jing	Wu Xin	198 (Annie Yi)	284
4	独上C楼 "Alone on building C" (Yellow ft. 范晓萱 Mavis Fan)	Jin Chen	Huang Shengyi	Jin Sha	340 (Huang Shengyi)	144
5	魔动闪霸：对手 "Magic flash: Opponent" (Smelly D)	Li Si Dan Ni	Yisa Yu	Zhu Jingxi	242 (Yisa Yu)	244
6	缘分一道桥 "A Bridge of Fate" (王力宏 Wang Leehom 谭维维 Tan Weiwei)	Wan Qian	Yumiko Cheng	A Duo	103 (Yumiko Cheng)	386
7	一剪梅 "A Cut of Plum" (费玉清 Fei Yu-ching)	Isabelle Huang	Wang Feifei	Wang Zhi	363 (Wang Feifei)	126
Total votes					1537	1858

The revival group gets one revival spot for their performance in individual battles.

=== Episode 11 (21 August 2020) ===
The episode shows the second part of the fifth round performance.

The second section is the group performance similar to previous rounds. If the revival group finishes first place, they will be entitled to receive two revival spots, finishing second will give them one revival spot, while finishing last would indicate failure of revival. This time, however, two Championship Candidate Groups have to battle against each other for the only auto-qualification for the final round of performance, which means up to 3 sisters from the danger group (Loser in two Championship Candidate Groups) will got replaced and won't compete for debuting spot. Accordingly, the leader of this group will be rechosen by audience's favorite.

If the revival group finally gets revival spots, then all members from revival group and the danger group will accept audience votes together. one or two or three members who received the least likes from the danger group are out of the final and be replaced by members who received the most likes from revival team. If the revival group indicates failure of revival, then the only sister who still can return will accept audience votes together with the danger group, the one who received the least likes will be eliminated.

Order	Songs	Member	Team votes	Audience likes	Result
1	莲 Lit (张艺兴 Lay Zhang)	Ning Jing	445	323	Pass
1	莲 Lit (张艺兴 Lay Zhang)	Yumiko Cheng	445	229	Pass
1	莲 Lit (张艺兴 Lay Zhang)	Wang Feifei	445	362	Pass
1	莲 Lit (张艺兴 Lay Zhang)	Lan Yingying	445	120	Pass
1	莲 Lit (张艺兴 Lay Zhang)	Yisa Yu	445	239	Pass
1	莲 Lit (张艺兴 Lay Zhang)	Michelle Bai	445	89	Eliminated
1	莲 Lit (张艺兴 Lay Zhang)	Huang Shengyi	445	101	Eliminated
2	玫瑰少年 Rose of Teenager (蔡依林 Jolin Tsai)	A Duo	470 (get one revival spot)	403	Revived
2	玫瑰少年 Rose of Teenager (蔡依林 Jolin Tsai)	Meng Jia	470 (get one revival spot)	434	Revived
2	玫瑰少年 Rose of Teenager (蔡依林 Jolin Tsai)	Shen Mengchen	470 (get one revival spot)	305	Revive Failure
2	玫瑰少年 Rose of Teenager (蔡依林 Jolin Tsai)	Wu Xin	470 (get one revival spot)	178	Revive Failure
2	玫瑰少年 Rose of Teenager (蔡依林 Jolin Tsai)	Jin Sha	470 (get one revival spot)	51	Revive Failure
2	玫瑰少年 Rose of Teenager (蔡依林 Jolin Tsai)	Zhu Jingxi	470 (get one revival spot)	80	Revive Failure
2	玫瑰少年 Rose of Teenager (蔡依林 Jolin Tsai)	Wang Zhi	470 (get one revival spot)	22	Revive Failure
3	情人 Lover (蔡徐坤 Cai Xukun)	Li Si Dan Ni	480	Did Not Participate	All qualified
3	情人 Lover (蔡徐坤 Cai Xukun)	Wan Qian	480	Did Not Participate	All qualified
3	情人 Lover (蔡徐坤 Cai Xukun)	Isabelle Huang	480	Did Not Participate	All qualified
3	情人 Lover (蔡徐坤 Cai Xukun)	Zhang Yuqi	480	Did Not Participate	All qualified
3	情人 Lover (蔡徐坤 Cai Xukun)	Zhang Hanyun	480	Did Not Participate	All qualified
3	情人 Lover (蔡徐坤 Cai Xukun)	Gina Jin	480	Did Not Participate	All qualified
3	情人 Lover (蔡徐坤 Cai Xukun)	Annie Yi	480	Did Not Participate	All qualified

Due to the revival group's second–place finish in the group performance, there are entitled to two revival spots. A Duo and Meng Jia successfully revived based on audience votes, while Michelle Bai and Huang Shengyi faced elimination. A Duo and Meng Jia automatically joined Ning Jing's group. Due to Group Ning Jing's performance. They have to revote for the leader. In those who passed round 5, Fei gets the most likes in audience's votes in last performance, but Fei and her teammates all voted Ning Jing. So the final group configurations for final round of performance are as follows:

Group 1: Li Si Dan Ni (Leader), Wan Qian, Gina Jin, Baby Zhang, Zhang Yuqi, Isabelle Huang, and Annie Yi

Group 2: Ning Jing (Leader), Wang Feifei, Meng Jia, Lan Yingying, A Duo, Yisa Yu, and Yumiko Cheng

=== Episode 12 (28 August 2020) ===
The sixth round of performance requires each group to perform three songs, two vocal–based and one dance–based. The selection of the songs shall be discussed by each team with the production team. They will then perform each song in groups of 3, 5, and 7.

Li Si Dan Ni Group
Performance	Songs	Members	Results
Group of 3	光之翼 Wing of Light by (王菲 Faye Wong)	Wan Qian	273
Group of 3	光之翼 Wing of Light by (王菲 Faye Wong)	Isabelle Huang	273
Group of 3	光之翼 Wing of Light by (王菲 Faye Wong)	Annie Yi	273
Group of 5	潇洒走一回 by (叶倩文 Sally Yeh)	Li Si Dan Ni	416
Group of 5	潇洒走一回 by (叶倩文 Sally Yeh)	Gina Jin	416
Group of 5	潇洒走一回 by (叶倩文 Sally Yeh)	Zhang Hanyun	416
Group of 5	潇洒走一回 by (叶倩文 Sally Yeh)	Isabelle Huang	416
Group of 5	潇洒走一回 by (叶倩文 Sally Yeh)	Zhang Yuqi	416
Group of 7	我期待 I Look Forward To" by (张雨生 Chang Yu-sheng)	Li Si Dan Ni	340
Group of 7	我期待 I Look Forward To" by (张雨生 Chang Yu-sheng)	Wan Qian	340
Group of 7	我期待 I Look Forward To" by (张雨生 Chang Yu-sheng)	Zhang Yuqi	340
Group of 7	我期待 I Look Forward To" by (张雨生 Chang Yu-sheng)	Zhang Hanyun	340
Group of 7	我期待 I Look Forward To" by (张雨生 Chang Yu-sheng)	Gina Jin	340
Group of 7	我期待 I Look Forward To" by (张雨生 Chang Yu-sheng)	Annie Yi	340
Group of 7	我期待 I Look Forward To" by (张雨生 Chang Yu-sheng)	Isabelle Huang	340
Total			1029

Ning Jing Group
Performance	Songs	Members	Results
Group of 3	是否 Whether or Not by (苏芮 Su Rui)	Ning Jing	344
Group of 3	是否 Whether or Not by (苏芮 Su Rui)	A Duo	344
Group of 3	是否 Whether or Not by (苏芮 Su Rui)	Yisa Yu	344
Group of 5	逆战 Fight Back by (张杰 Jason Zhang)	Ning Jing	368 (Most likes from online audience in Final)
Group of 5	逆战 Fight Back by (张杰 Jason Zhang)	Wang Feifei	368 (Most likes from online audience in Final)
Group of 5	逆战 Fight Back by (张杰 Jason Zhang)	Meng Jia	368 (Most likes from online audience in Final)
Group of 5	逆战 Fight Back by (张杰 Jason Zhang)	Lan Yingying	368 (Most likes from online audience in Final)
Group of 5	逆战 Fight Back by (张杰 Jason Zhang)	Yumiko Cheng	368 (Most likes from online audience in Final)
Group of 7	Last Dance by (伍佰 Wu Bai)	Ning Jing	415
Group of 7	Last Dance by (伍佰 Wu Bai)	Wang Feifei	415
Group of 7	Last Dance by (伍佰 Wu Bai)	Meng Jia	415
Group of 7	Last Dance by (伍佰 Wu Bai)	Lan Yingying	415
Group of 7	Last Dance by (伍佰 Wu Bai)	Yumiko Cheng	415
Group of 7	Last Dance by (伍佰 Wu Bai)	A Duo	415
Group of 7	Last Dance by (伍佰 Wu Bai)	Yisa Yu	415
Total			1124

The episode only showed the number of total votes two teams get, and all sisters won't know who gets more votes until Formation Night.

=== Episode 13: Championship Group Formation Night (4 September 2020) ===
After four months of exciting performances, this episode shall reveal the sisters who will debut as a 7–member group. The selection of the 7 sisters is done through several rounds of voting based on multiple performances throughout the show as well as individual popularity.

Through each of the four rounds, 1, 2, 2, and 2 debuting spots will be given (respectively). Each team earns either 1 or 2 spots each round by getting more votes in the round.

Round 1: The leaders from each team goes up to the podium to announce the number of votes received for each of their three songs performed during Episode 12. Whichever group received the most points combined from the three songs will get one debuting spot. (Ning Jing Group gets the spot)

Round 2: Two teams will compete the number of votes received from online audience for each of their three songs performed during Episode 12. Whichever group received the most points combined from the three songs will get two debuting spot, and whichever group received the most likes for single song will get another debuting spot. (Ning Jing Group gets the spot for most points from one single song, and Li Si Dan Ni Group gets two spots for most points from three songs in total)

Round 3: Two teams will compete the number of votes received from online audience for each of their all shows performed during the previous episodes. Whichever group received the most points combined from all shows will get two debuting spot. (Li Si Dan Ni Group gets the spots)

Round 4: Two teams will compete the number of votes received from online audience for likes to all the members during the whole season. Whichever group received the most points combined from the total likes to members will get one debuting spot. (Ning Jing Group gets the spot)

The seven sisters who Debuted are:

1. Ning Jing

2. Regina Wan

3. Meng Jia

4. Sdanny Lee - X Leader

5. Zhang Yu Qi

6. Yisa Yu

7. Isabelle Huang

There are also 5 individual awards in the season:

X-Leader, for the leader from the group with more debuting spots. (Dany Lee)

X-Sister, for the member who gets most likes during the whole season. (Ning Jing)

The show with most likes from online audiences from last five public shows. (情人 Lover)

Wave Treasure, for the winner of the surfing chart before the Final. (Meng Jia)

Making Waves Role Model, for leading sisters from different professions.

The final night was aired live on Hunan Entertainment Broadcasting Channel as well as MangoTV. Acclaimed journalist and talk show host Yang Lan joined Huang Xiaoming as hosts. Original singer of the show's theme song Li Yuchun a.k.a. Chris Lee was present to perform the theme song, flanked by all 30 sisters, in a Victoria's Secret runway–like stage. Other performing celebrities include Cai Xukun, Jason Zhang, NEXT (Chinese band), and a variation of performances from the 30 sisters themselves. Also present were the likes of Li Chen (actor), Yin Zheng (actor), Ayanga, Oscar Sun Jian, Zhou Shen, and several key members of the Chinese Women's Volleyball Team.

== Soundtrack ==
"Ms. Priceless (无价之姐)" was written and sung by Chris Lee, and was released on June 18, 2020. It serves as the show's theme song.

No.	Title	Lyrics	Music	Singer	Length
1.	"Ms. Priceless (无价之姐)"	Chris Lee	孙侨志KELZIE	Chris Lee	3:04

== International broadcast ==
Country	Network	Release	Notes
Singapore	E City	17 August 2020	

== International versions ==
Country	Title	Network	Release	Notes
Vietnam	Chị đẹp đạp gió rẽ sóng	VTV	28 October 2023	
