= Liu Yun (actress) =

Chinese actress

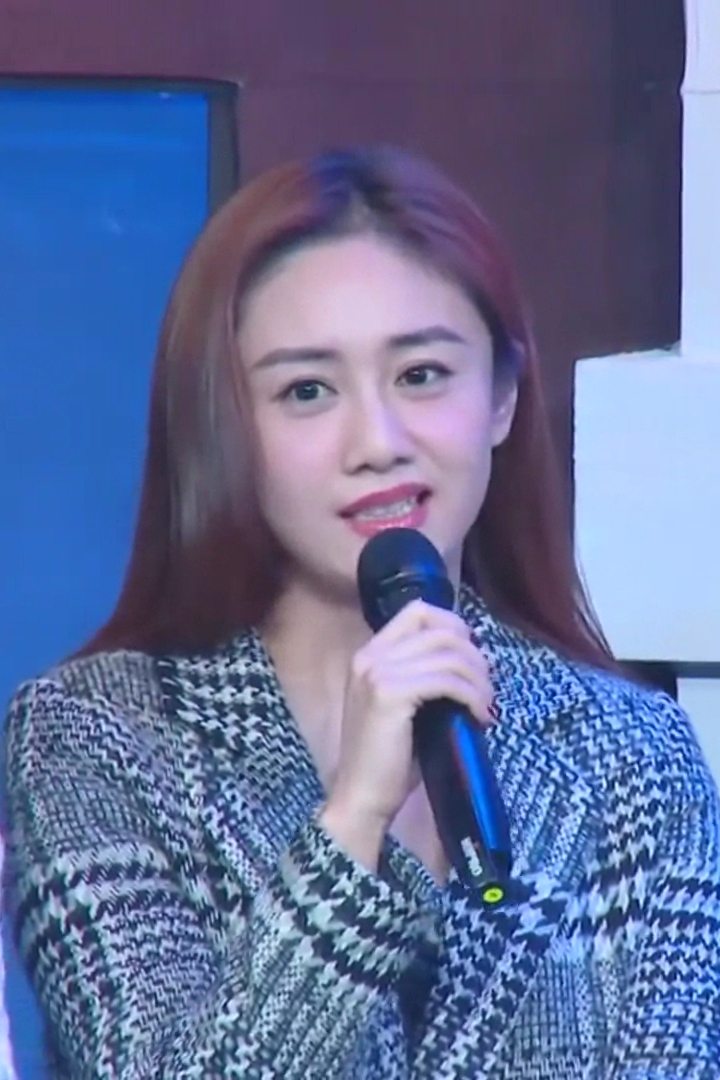
- Liu in 2019
- Born: Changsha, Hunan, China
- Education: Central Academy of Drama
- Occupation: Actress
- Years active: 2001–present
- Spouse: Zheng Jun (m. 2010)
- Children: 1

Liu Yun (simplified Chinese: 刘芸; traditional Chinese: 劉芸; pinyin: Liú Yún) is a Chinese actress.

== Biography ==
Liu Yun was raised in Changsha, Hunan, China; and later became a graduate from Central Academy of Drama. Liu later played several leading roles in TV serials and films like The Prince of Han Dynasty, Royal Tramp and One Plum Blossom.

== Personal life ==
On May 26, 2010, Liu married famous Chinese rock star Zheng Jun, and gave birth to their baby boy Zheng Xingfu, in Los Angeles, U.S., on October 23, 2010.

== Filmography ==
=== Film ===
| Year | English title | Chinese title | Role | Notes/Ref. |
|---|---|---|---|---|
| 2004 | The Message | 风声 | Nurse | Cameo |
| 2006 | Walking towards The Sun | 走向太阳 | Xiao Douzi | |
| 2006 | | 大道如天 | Su Mei | |
| 2009 | | 重归杜鹃 | Su Mei | |
| 2010 | You Deserve to Be Single | 活该你单身 | Mei Jia | Cameo |
| 2012 | In-Laws New Year | 亲家过年 | Zheng Dandan | |
| 2012 | Hushed Roar | 咆哮无声 | Wanyun | |
| 2013 | Block Buster | 大片 | Xiaohua | |
| 2013 | Bump in the Road | 一路顺疯 | Meiling | |
| 2013 | A Moment of Love | 回到爱开始的地方 | Wei Weian | |
| 2014 | Long's Story | 硬汉奶爸 | Yiling | |
| 2014 | Ex Fighting | 房车奇遇 | Lisa | |
| 2015 | Goodbye to our Ten Years | 再见我们的十年 | Qiqi | |

=== Television series ===
| Year | English title | Chinese title | Role | Notes/Ref. |
|---|---|---|---|---|
| 2001 | The Promise of Destiny | 命运的承诺 | Yang Ruoliu | |
| 2001 | Three Gates | 三重门 | Shen Xier | |
| 2002 | | 新五女拜寿 | Nuan Yun | |
| 2002 | Crazy for the Song | 我为歌狂 | Maggie, Mai Yunjie | |
| 2003 | The Prince of Han Dynasty 2 | 大汉天子2 | Qiu Chan | |
| 2003 | | 汗血宝马 | Feng Che | |
| 2004 | | 大汉巾帼 | Juan Zi | |
| 2004 | | 追凶 | Lin Fang | |
| 2005 | | 誓不罢休 | Lin Fang | |
| 2005 | | 了凡 | Zhao Linger | |
| 2005 | Romance of Red Dust | 风尘三侠之红拂女 | Chi Su | |
| 2007 | Rich Man Poor Love | 钻石王老五的艰难爱情 | Yu Fei | |
| 2008 | Deep Affection Life | 浓情一生 | Jiang Li | |
| 2008 | Royal Tramp | 鹿鼎记 | Mu Jianping | |
| 2009 | Secret Train | 秘密列车 | Xin Hongyu | |
| 2009 | You Will Never Walk Alone | 你永远不会独行 | Yinan | |
| 2009 | One Plum Blossom | 新一剪梅 | Wan Qiuling | |
| 2010 | Worrying | 牵挂 | Niujia Xiaomei | |
| 2012 | Beijing Love Story | 北京爱情故事 | Mimi | Cameo |
| 2012 | Beautiful Day | 风和日丽 | Mi Yanyan | |
| 2012 | | 河洛康家 | Cui Yuehong | |
| 2012 | | 恋恋东丽湖 | Xiaoba | |
| 2012 | The Girls | 女人帮·妞儿 | Sha Jing | |
| 2013 | Bad Romantic | 艾乐乐的罗曼蒂克 | Ai Lele | |
| 2013 | Love is Not Blind | 失恋33天 | | Cameo |
| 2013 | Little Daddy | 小爸爸 | | Cameo |
| 2014 | Accoucheur | 产科男医生 | Mei Yuzhu | |
| 2014 | Foolish Legend | 傻儿传奇 | Li Ruoyun | |
| 2016 | | 老公们的私房钱 | Zheng Duoduo | |
| 2017 | Song of Phoenix | 思美人 | Zheng Xiu | |
| 2018 | | 小棉袄 | Murong Xue | |
| 2018 | The Rise of Phoenixes | 天盛长歌 | Manchun | |
| 2020 | Forward Forever | 热血传奇 | Fang'er | |
| 2020 | Sister's Palpitate with Excitement | 怦然心动的小姐姐 | Su Yiwen | |
| 2020 | Under The Sun | 生活像阳光一样灿烂 | Bai Canlan | |
| 2020 | The Coolest World | 最酷的世界 | Teng Xiaoxiao | |
| 2021 | The Rebel Princess | 上阳赋 | Su Jin'er | |
| 2023 | Stand or Fall | 闪耀的她 | Chen Xuanxuan | |

=== Variety show ===
| Year | English title | Chinese title | Role | Notes/Ref. |
|---|---|---|---|---|
| 2020 | Sisters Who Make Waves | 乘风破浪的姐姐 | Cast member | |
