= Chong Er's Preach =

2019 Chinese TV series

- Also known as: The Legend of Chong Er
- Traditional Chinese: 重耳傳奇
- Simplified Chinese: 重耳传奇
- Hanyu Pinyin: Chóng Ěr Chuánqí
- Genre: Historical, romantic comedy
- Written by: Li Zhuo
- Directed by: Lai Shuiqing; Zhao Jian
- Starring: Wang Longhua; Baby Zhang; Zhang Yishan; Madina Memet; Purba Rgyal; Lan Yan; Shen Mengchen; Gan Tingting
- Country of origin: China
- Original language: Mandarin
- No. of seasons: 1
- No. of episodes: 72

Production
- Executive producer: Zhao Haicheng
- Production locations: Xiangshan Film and Television Town; Hengdian World Studios; Beijing
- Production companies: China Film Group Corporation; Global Hao Xiang Television Media; Cultural Media Co., Ltd.

Original release
- Network: Zhejiang Television
- Release: March 12, 2019

Chong Er's Preach, also known as The Legend of Chong Er (Chinese: 重耳传奇) is a 2019 Chinese historical romantic comedy television series directed by Lai Shuiqing and Zhao Jian and starring Wang Longhua, Baby Zhang, Zhang Yishan, Madina Memet, Purba Rgyal, Shen Mengchen, and Gan Tingting. It is produced jointly by China Film Group Corporation, Global Hao Xiang Television Media and Shenzhen Yucong Cultural Media Co., Ltd.. The television series follows the story of the Duke Wen of Jin from exile to later ascending the throne to become king. This television series has a 2.6 rating on Douban.

== Plot ==
This is the story of Chong Er (Wang Longhua), a talented and kind prince. He is entangled in romantic relationships with Li Ji (Madina Memet), Qi Jiang (Zhang Hanyun), Qin Yingyue (Shen Mengchen), and Ji Wei (Gan Tingting), and faces numerous assassination attempts.

== Cast ==
=== Main ===
- Wang Longhua as Chong Er, the second son of the Duke Xian of Jin.
- Baby Zhang as Qi Jiang, princess of Qi State.
- Zhang Yishan as Yi Wu, the third son of the Duke Xian of Jin
- Madina Memet as Li Ji, the elder princess of Lirong State
- Purba Rgyal as Shen Sheng, the first son of the Duke Xian of Jin.
- Lan Yan as Consort Jia Ji
- Shen Mengchen as Ying Yue
- Gan Tingting as Ji Wei
- He Gang as Jie Zitui, an aristocrat who serves the Jin prince Chong'er.
- Guo Xiaoran as Zhao Cui, a general of the Jin State.

=== Supporting ===
- Cheng Yuanyuan as Consort Shao, the second princess of Lirong State
- Lin Yongjian as Duke Mu of Qin
- Wang Yan as Consort Hu
- Wang Gang as the monarch of Lirong State
- Yvonne Yung as Consort Qi
- Gong Beibi as Consort Yun
- Chen Zihan as Consort of the King of Zhou
- Bao Jianfeng as Duke Huan of Tian Qi
- Li Zonghan as Tai Hao
- Mai Hongmei as the empress of Lirong State
- Hou Yaohua as Uncle Hu
- Liu Jinshan as King of Zhou

== Soundtrack ==
No.	Title	Lyrics	Music	Singer(s)	Length
1.	"Ambitious Men Aims Far (好男儿志在四方)" (Opening theme)	Qu Quansheng and Hu Shuai	Hu Shuai	Wang Longhua

== Production ==
Principal photography started on 11 May 2016 and wrapped on September 7 of that same year. Most of the television series was shot on location in Xiangshan Film and Television Town, Hengdian World Studios and Beijing.

On June 13, 2016, Lan Yan was cast in the television series to play Consort Jia, younger sister of General Jia Hua and beautiful consort who is married to Prince Shen Sheng of the Jin State. On July 19, Li Zonghan was cast in a supporting role as Tai Hao in the television series.

== Ratings ==
Air date	Episode	CSM55 city network ratings			CSM National Network ratings		
Air date	Episode	Ratings (%)	Audience share (%)	Rank	Ratings (%)	Audience share (%)	Rank
March 12, 2019	1-2	0.553	3.845	2	0.21	2.45	2
March 13, 2019	3-4	0.474	3.447	2	0.3	2.66	2
March 14, 2019	5-6	0.489	3.650	1	0.22	2.84	1
March 19, 2019	7-8	0.470	3.478	2	0.24	2.16	2
March 20, 2019	9-10	0.458	3.325	2	0.17	2.16	2
March 21, 2019	11-12	0.520	3.756	1	0.23	2.18	1
March 26, 2019	13-14	0.526	3.798	2	0.17	2.12	2
March 27, 2019	15-16	0.575	4.279	2	0.16	2.08	2
March 28, 2019	17-18	0.609	4.559	1	0.2	2.57	1
April 2, 2019	19-20	0.493	3.704	2	0.19	1.83	2
April 3, 2019	21-22	0.581	4.361	2	0.21	1.99	2
April 4, 2019	23-24	0.671	4.380	1	0.24	2.42	1
April 9, 2019	25-26	0.581	4.213	2	0.19	1.77	2
April 10, 2019	27-28	0.444	3.347	2	0.21	1.97	2
April 11, 2019	29-30	0.507	3.738	2	0.24	2.21	2
April 16, 2019	31-32	0.524	3.799	2	0.19	1.8	2
April 17, 2019	33-34	0.543	3.965	2	0.14	1.79	2
April 18, 2019	35-36	0.519	3.907	2	0.14	1.82	2
April 23, 2019	37-38	0.492	3.452	2	0.15	1.83	2
April 24, 2019	39-40	0.451	3.281	2	0.15	1.83	2
April 25, 2018	41-42	0.491	3.534	2	0.12	1.55	2
April 30, 2019	43-44	0.609	3.787	2	0.2	2.03	2
May 1, 2019	45-46	0.618	3.931	1	0.22	2.37	1
May 2, 2019	47-48	0.708	4.703	1	0.31	2.48	1
May 7, 2019	49-50	0.475	3.278	2	0.12	1.48	2
May 8, 2019	51-52	0.465	3.325	2	0.14	1.65	2
May 9, 2019	53-54	0.645	4.819	1	0.2	2.47	1
May 14, 2019	55-56	0.471	3.299	2	0.21	1.87	2
May 15, 2019	57-58	0.481	3.541	2	0.2	1.81	2
May 16, 2019	59-60	0.544	4.151	1	0.24	2.23	1
May 21, 2019	61-62	0.469	3.296	2	0.2	1.79	2
May 22, 2019	63-64	0.471	3.478	2	0.13	1.55	2
May 23, 2019	65-66	0.527	3.874	1	0.24	2.28	1
May 28, 2019	67-68	0.436	3.098	2	0.22	1.98	2
May 29, 2019	69-70	0.432	3.096	2	0.22	2	2
May 30, 2019	71-72	/	/	/	/	/	/

- Highest ratings are marked in red, lowest ratings are marked in blue
