= Alina Zhang =

Chinese actress

Zhang Meng
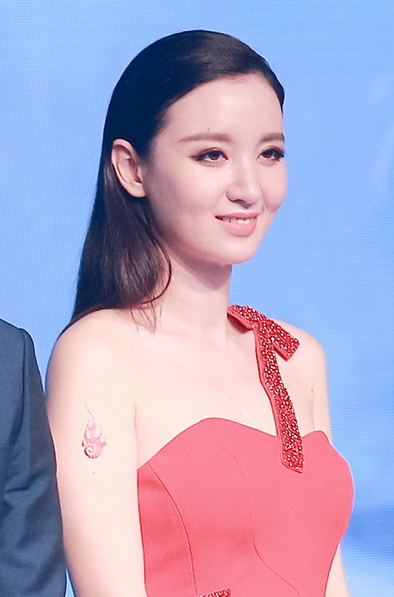
- Zhang at Ice Fantasy press conference on 12 August 2015
- Born: March 6, 1981 (age 45); Tianjin, China
- Other name: Alina Zhang
- Education: University of New South Wales
- Occupation: Actress
- Agent: Shanghai Youhug Media
- Spouse: Lü Chao

Chinese name
- Traditional Chinese: 張萌
- Simplified Chinese: 张萌
Transcriptions
Standard Mandarin
- Hanyu Pinyin: Zhāng Méng

Zhang Meng (Chinese: 张萌, born 6 March 1981), also known as Alina Zhang, is a Chinese actress and producer.

== Early life and education ==
Zhang was born into a musical family and studied singing and dancing from an early age. During senior secondary school, she moved to Australia, where she worked various jobs, including giving piano lessons, waiting tables, and selling mobile phones. She graduated from the University of New South Wales in 2003 with a degree in fashion design.

== Career ==
=== Pageantry ===
Zhang entered the entertainment industry by becoming the champion for Miss China Universe in 2004. She went on to represent China in the 53rd Miss Universe beauty pageant.

Upon winning Miss China Universe, Zhang was given contracts as brand ambassador for the Shenzhen International Jewellery Fair and other beauty brands.

=== Acting ===
Zhang made her onscreen debut in the television series Wo Zhu Chen Fu.

Her breakthrough came in the 2010 fantasy adventure series The Myth, based on the 2005 Hong Kong film of the same title. It acquired very high viewership ratings, and raised Zhang's profile. She then starred in the business romance drama War and Beauty.

In 2012, Zhang joined Youhug Media, founded by her husband Lü Chao, and began working as both an actress and producer.

In 2013, Zhang starred in family comedy drama Baby.

In 2014, Zhang earned increased recognition in period romance drama Always Love You. The same year she starred in acclaimed legal drama Divorce Lawyers.

In 2013, Zhang starred in modern romance drama Dare to Love.

In 2016, Zhang starred in fantasy epic drama Ice Fantasy as the Fire Princess, Yan Da.

In 2017, Zhang starred in family drama Weekend Parents. The same year she was nominated at the Huading Awards for Best Supporting Actress with her performance in Little Husband.

In 2018, she starred in adventure drama television series The Tomb of Sea.

In 2020, she competed in the first season of Sisters Who Make Waves.

In 2026, she joined with Ma Tianyu in the reality show I Miss You.

== Filmography ==
=== Film ===
Year	English title	Chinese title	Role	Notes/Ref.
2006	The 601st Phone Call	第601个电话	He Ling	
2011	You Must Get Married This Year	今年你一定要嫁出去	Li Ying	
2017	Fight for Love	因为爱情	Li Mengli	
2019	Coward Hero	鼠胆英雄		

=== Television series ===
Year	English title	Chinese title	Role	Notes/Ref.
2005	Wo Zhu Chen Fu	我主沉浮	Chen Mingli	
2005	My Father, Mother and Siblings	老爸老妈兄弟姐妹	Tan Yanyan	
2006	My Hero	我本英雄	Chen Mingli	
2006	Ji Gong Xin Zhuan	济公新传	Da Xiang	
2007	Love at First Fight	武十郎	Lei Xiaoyu	
2008	Who Knows My Heart	谁懂我的心	Apple	
2008	The Blue Files	蓝色档案	Song Dan'ni	
2008	Shang Qing	伤情	Xia Nuanqing	
2008	Xiang Ai Dou Nan	想爱都难	Liu Xing'er	
2009	A Sword	利剑	Ma Menglan	
2009	Red Electric Wave	红色电波	Zhang Jiawen	
2009	Growing Up	成长	An Ye	
2010	The Myth	神话	Gao Lan	
2010	Away Your Depression	赶走你的忧郁	Xia Po	
2010	Feng Yu Diao Hua Lou	风雨雕花楼	Lin Yumin	
2010	Detective Tanglang	唐琅探案	Huang Que	
2010	Golden Branches and Jade Leaves	金枝玉叶	Yu Qi	
2011	Men	男人帮	Liu Bingbing	
2011	Epoch Making	开天辟地	Yang Kaihui	
2012	Jian Dao Dui	尖刀队之血刃	Jin Daiyu	
2012	You Are My Lover	你是我爱人	Lian Jie	
2012	Thirty Years of Age	而立之年	Jessica	
2013	Always Love You	情定三生	Shen Lingxue	
2013	Baby	宝贝	Chen Jingpo	
2014	Divorce Lawyers	离婚律师	Jiao Yanyan	
2014	My Marriage, I Decide	我的婚姻谁做主	Tang Xiaoxiao	
2014	The Romance of the Condor Heroes	新神雕侠侣	Liu Yinggu	
2014	Lady & Liar	千金女贼	Yao Mei'er	
2015	The Legend of Qin	秦时明月	Li Ya	
2015	Three Dads	三个奶爸	Zou Nan	
2015	Dare to Love	敢爱	Lei lei	
2015	The Boss is Coming	老板来了	Guan Qiuyue	
2016	Ice Fantasy	幻城	Yan Da	
2016	Little Husband	小丈夫	Lu Xiaoshan	
2017	Weekend Parents	周末父母	Zhao Zudi	
2017	Ice Fantasy Destiny	幻城凡世	Yan Da	
2018	The Tomb of Sea	沙海	Su Nan	
2019	Princess Silver	白发		producer
2019	My Girlfriend is an Alien	外星女生柴小七	Sister Chai	Special appearance
2020	I Will Find You a Better Home	安家	Zhang Chengcheng	
2020	Cross Fire	穿越火线		also producer
2020	Together	在一起		
2023	Stand or Fall	闪耀的她	Jing Zhiqiu	
TBA	City Dwellers	城市租客	Yin Lihua	
TBA	Beauty From Heart	这个世界不看脸	Yu Jiajie	
TBA	Saker Falco	猎隼	Ye Xinyan	
TBA	People's Property	人民的财产		
TBA	The Investigator	商业调查师	Su Shan	

=== Variety show ===
Year	English title	Chinese title	Role	Notes/Ref.
2020	Sisters Who Make Waves	乘风破浪的姐姐	Cast member	
2026	I Miss You	后会友期	Cast member	

== Discography ==
=== Soundtrack appearances ===
Year	English title	Chinese title	Album	Notes
2007	"Who Knows My Heart"	谁懂我的心	Who Knows My Heart OST	
2008	"Ask"	问	The Blue Files OST	
2008	"Remember Rainbow"	记得彩虹	Red Electric Wave OST	
2010	"Time Travel"	穿越	The Myth OST	
2011	"War and Beauty"	金枝玉叶	War and Beauty OST	
2013	"Baby"	宝贝	Baby OST	
2015	"Song of Clearing Feelings"	浅情歌	Dare to Love OST	

== Awards and nominations ==
Year	Award	Category	Nominated work	Result	Ref.
2020	7th The Actors of China Awards	Best Actress (Sapphire)	—N/a	Nominated	
