= Ice Fantasy =

2016 Chinese television drama

- Ice Fantasy poster/promotional image
- Also known as: City of Fantasy; Huàn Chéng
- Genre: Fantasy; Action-adventure; Romance
- Based on: City of Fantasy by Guo Jingming
- Written by: Shen Zhining
- Directed by: Ju Jueliang; Zou Jicheng
- Starring: Feng Shaofeng; Victoria Song; Ma Tianyu; Zhang Meng; Madina Memet
- Theme music composer: V.K (V.K克)
- Opening theme: "Shouldn't" by Jay Chou and A-mei
- Ending theme: "Bottom of Heart" by Cindy Yen
- Composer: V.K.
- Countries of origin: China; Hong Kong
- Original language: Mandarin
- No. of seasons: 2
- No. of episodes: 62 (1st season); 16 (2nd season)

Production
- Executive producers: Feng Shaofeng; Ge Ning
- Producers: Luo Gang; Chen Shuying
- Production locations: Inner Mongolia; Beijing; Hebei
- Camera setup: Multiple-camera setup
- Running time: 45 mins
- Production company: Shanghai Youhug Media Co. Ltd.

Original release
- Network: Hunan Broadcasting System (Hunan TV)
- Release: 24 July – 10 November 2016

Ice Fantasy (Chinese: 幻城; pinyin: Huànchéng) is a Chinese epic fantasy television drama based on Guo Jingming's bestselling novel, City of Fantasy. The drama was produced by Shanghai Youhug Media, directed by Ju Jue Liang, and stars Feng Shaofeng, Victoria Song, Ma Tianyu, Zhang Meng and Madina Memet. It was broadcast on Hunan Satellite Television Diamond independent broadcast theater starting 24 July to 10 November 2016 for 62 episodes.

A 16-episode modern sequel, titled Ice Fantasy Destiny (幻城凡世) starring Feng Shaofeng, Zhang Yuqi, and Zhang Meng, started airing on Tencent Video on 8 March 2017.

The release of the last episodes were delayed because of censorship reviews.

== Synopsis ==
When the second prince of the fire tribe, Xin Jue (Jiang Chao), was mysteriously killed during his visit to the Ice Tribe for Ka Suo's coming-of-age ceremony, the Fire King Huo Yi (Hu Bing) uses this as an excuse to start a second war between the Fire Tribe and Ice Tribe. With their parents captured and older siblings killed, the two remaining Ice Princes Ka Suo (Feng Shaofeng) and Ying Kong Shi (Ma Tianyu) escape to the mortal world and seek help from realm guardian Li Luo (Victoria Song) to help obtain ice crystals from six tribes in order to restore the Ice Wall, so that the Ice Tribe can be saved.

After the Fire Tribe was defeated with the Deicide Sword, Ka Suo reluctantly battles his brother for the throne, but he wants nothing more than the freedom to be with his lover Li Luo. Ying Kong Shi does everything in his power to take the throne away from Ka Suo, to ensure that Ka Suo has his freedom, while Yan Da (Zhang Meng), the Fire Princess, is willing to give up everything for Shi. Then, Ka Suo's loved ones all die off one by one under the conspiracies of Yuan Ji (Yan Yikuan) and Lian Ji (Kim Hee-sun), and he is determined to find the legendary "veiled lotus". A war between the Ice and Fire Tribe commences again, with Li Tian Jin joining the Fire Tribe to get his revenge on Ka Suo.

== Cast ==
=== Main ===
Actor	Character	Introduction
Feng Shaofeng	Ka Suo (卡索)	As the kindest and most powerful of the ice princes, Ka Suo was his father's presumed successor. However after falling in love with his first love Li Luo, he longs for freedom, but is bound by his responsibility to his kingdom. He is forced to assume the throne to oversee reconstruction efforts for the Ice Tribe after the war. Later his brother, crowned as King, ordered Ka Suo to marry Li Luo. But the marriage was short lived when she was stabbed by Lan Shang on her wedding night. Ka Suo then goes on a journey with his friends to look for the veiled lotus to try to bring his loved ones back to life. Feng also plays Ka Suo's ancestor She Mi (舍弥), the first Ice King and founder of the Ice Tribe.
Victoria Song; Ji Zihan (young)	Li Luo (梨落); Li Jing (离镜)	Li Luo is born with lowly civilian status, but with her brave and resolute attitude, she quickly becomes a powerful warrior and envoy for the mortal guards. She meets Ka Suo and the two fall in love. On her wedding, she was accidentally stabbed with the Deicide sword by Lan Shang while saving Ying Kong Shi. She was sealed in ice and placed at the bottom of the Infinity Ocean. She is later brought back to life by the veiled lotus, bearing Lan Shang's appearance. Li Jing is Lan Shang's incarnation and looks just like Li Luo, so she has Lan Shang's soul and Li Luo's looks. She was granted immortality and crowned the Queen of Ice Tribe by Ka Suo. It is later revealed that Li Luo and Lan Shang's souls have switched bodies.
Ma Tianyu; Bian Cheng (young)	Ying Kong Shi (樱空释) Sword Spirit Shi (剑灵释); Li Tian Jin (罹天燼)	Ying Kong Shi is the younger half-brother of Ka Suo, who wants to replace him as king of the Ice Tribe to set his brother free. He is silent, cold and mysterious in nature. Sword Spirit Shi is the last piece of soul left of Shi, when he was killed with the Deicide sword. He entered the Holy Snow Shrine with Ka Suo and also befriended Yan Da. Li Tian Jin is the reincarnation of Ying Kong Shi and is also the Fire Tribe's new ally who wants to get revenge on Ka Suo.
Zhang Meng; Zhao Meiting (young)	Yan Da (艳炟)	Yan Da is the only current princess of the Fire Tribe. She is known for her unruly ways, stubbornness, and strong nature, even though her training as a warrior is unremarkable among immortals. She is much more kindhearted than she or her father would like to admit, and she develops a very strong bond with Ying Kong Shi.
Madina Memet	Lan Shang (岚裳)	Lan Shang is the noble mermaid princess who is known for her beauty and loved by many. However, she only has eyes for Ka Suo. After a series of tragic events, she committed suicide by jumping into the ocean, as a mermaid who lost her virginity to a foreign tribe cannot have a tail ever again and cannot breathe underwater. She incarnates by the veiled lotus and bears Li Luo's looks and her memories as Li Luo remains. It is later revealed that Li Luo and Lan Shang's souls have switched bodies.

=== Supporting ===
==== Immortals ====
===== Ice Tribe =====
- Shao Bing as Lin Chao (凛弨), the Ice King (冰王)
- Gong Beibi as Chen Tong (晨浵) the Ice Queen (冰后)
- Cheng Peipei as Feng Tian (封天)

Lin Chao's mother and the Ice Tribe's most powerful illusionist.

- Huang Shengchi as Shang Lie (熵裂), Crown prince
- Zhang Ziwen as Zhu Gong (铸弓), Eldest Prince
- Li Sheng as Qian Ying (千影), Princess Consort
- He Xiang as Li Guang (靂光), Second prince
- Wang Yitong as Nan Xing (南星), Third princess
- Ou Xianru as Xue Mi (雪宓), Fourth princess
- Dan Sihan as Xuan Ta (泫榻)

Leader of the Seven Saints charged with safeguarding the Ice Tribe.

- Wang Yu as Ji Quan (笈筌)

Warrior of the Ice Tribe. Ka Suo's childhood friend.

- Mou Xing as Hua Xiao (花效)
- Lu Yong as Old Ice King (老冰王)

Feng Tian's husband, Lin Chao's father, and Ka Suo's grandfather.

- Yin Jian as Du Yin (阇印)

The Demon Guest. Fallen immortal of the Ice Tribe.

===== Immortal Beings of the Holy Snow Shrine =====
- Yan Yikuan as Yuan Ji (淵祭)

An invincible and supreme being of Ice Flame Tribe (冰焰族). He created the chaos that ensue in the immortal world, including the assassination of Prince Xin Jue and the conflict between Ka Suo and Ying Kong Shi. He is also Ying Kong Shi's biological father and the last descendant of the Ice Flame Tribe.

- Zhang Xinyi as Lotus Spirit (隐莲精灵)
- Gong Zhengnan as Qing Ren (倾刃)

Western protector of the Holy Shrine, later Eastern protector.

- Sun Zujun as Qing Long (青龍)

Eastern protector of the Holy Shrine.

- Deng Sha as Xing Zhou (星昼)

Northern protector of the Holy Shrine.

- Jurat as Phoenix (凤凰)

Assassin of the Holy Shrine.

- Zhang Zimu as Yan Huang (言謊)

===== Fire Tribe =====
- Hu Bing as Huo Yi (火燚)

The Fire King. A power-hungry and cruel man who aims to become the ruler of the three realms.

- Shu Yaxin as Shuo Gang (烁罡), Crown prince
- Jiang Chao as Xin Jue (炘绝), Second prince

===== Mermaid Tribe =====
- Shen Hairong as Mermaid Saint (人鱼圣尊)

Queen of the Mermaid Tribe. Lan Shang's adoptive grandmother and Lian Ji's adoptive mother. She is an opportunistic woman who is willing to sacrifice her children's happiness to achieve peace for her tribe.

- Kim Hee-sun as Lian Ji (莲姬)
  - Michelle Bai as young Lian Ji

Ying Kong Shi's mother and Lan Shang's adoptive aunt. She was an adoptive child of the royal mermaid family and was in love with the Fire King, but was forced by the Mermaid Saint to marry the Ice King. Acting as a spy for the Fire Tribe, the Ice Tribe collapsed under her betrayal.

==== Spirits ====
===== Spiritual Tribe =====
- Chen Xinyu as Chao Ya (潮涯)

Current Queen of the Spiritual Tribe. A kind and noble woman who is willing to make sacrifices to protect her tribe. She is engaged to Liao Jian, but was formerly in love with Pian Feng.

- Wu You as Die Che (蝶澈)

The most powerful musician in the Spiritual Tribe. She serves Yuan Ji as the Holy Shrine's Southern protector.

- Fan Shiqi as Chi Mo (迟墨)

A musician. Die Che's lover who is actually the Fire Tribe's descendant.

- Wang Yidan as Chi Lian (傺楝)

Former Queen of the Tribe, Chao ya's mother. She left the tribe many years ago in search for the Sighing Wall.

===== Eagle Tribe =====
- Zhang Yujian as Pian Feng (片风)

A chivalrous and capable guard who serves Chao Ya and was once in love with her.

===== Bear Tribe =====
- Liu Dongqin as Liao Jian (辽溅)

King of the Tribe, and a fierce warrior. He is engaged to Chao Ya.

- Wang Tianye as Hei Feng (黑風)

A tyrannical warrior that kidnapped Liao Jian and took over the Bear Tribe for awhile.

==== Humans ====
===== Guardians of the Realms =====
- Huang Haibing as Ke Tuo (克托)

Leader of the guardians who preserve peace in the three kingdoms. He took Li Luo under his care when she was a child.

- Huang Deyi as Qin Chu (秦楚)

Li Luo's admirer and best friend.

- Qin Yong as Lü Zhao (绿昭)
- Choenyi Tsering (曲尼次仁) as Yang Dan (阳丹)

===== Others =====
- Ding Xiaoying as Jia Yi (迦凌)

Du Yin's lover.

===== Dream Tribe =====
- Xu Ke as Xing Jiu (星旧)

The Head Dreamer. One of the Seven Saints charged with safeguarding the Ice Tribe. A loyal and kind man who faithfully executes his duty to safeguard dreamers everywhere. He cares deeply for his sister.

- Xu Jiao as Xing Gui (星轨)

Princess of the Dream Tribe and Xing Jiu's sister. She was meant to die on her 100th birthday, but survived and later becomes a Western protector of the Holy Shrine.

- Tie Zheng as Xun Hao (蕁昊)

Chief administrator of the Dream Clan.

- Gao Yuqing as Old Astrologer King (老夢主)

Father of Xing Jiu and Xing Gui.

===== Healer Tribe =====
- Wang Duo as Huang Tuo (皇柝)

Current King of the Healers and the best healer in the three kingdoms. He is in love with Yue Shen.

- Lu Zizhen as Yue Shen (月神)

A powerful healer who can exorcise spirits and poison mortals.

- Peng Yang as Yue Zhao (月照) / Yue Leng (月冷)

Yue Shen's sister. She was engaged to Huang Tuo.

- Li Haohan as Huang Mao (皇昂)

Former King of the Healers. Huang Tuo's father.

==== Others ====
- Wang Yizhe as Rabbit Demon (兔妖)
- Bian Jiacheng as Rat Demon (鼠妖)
- Sun Qingsan as Deer Spirit (鹿精)
- Qu Gan as Tree Demon (樹妖)
- Lu Xue as Tiger Demon (虎妖)
- Zhu Chunqiao as Zhu Hao (筍昊)
- Xu Tianhao as Zhan Xing (沽星)
- He Fei as Liu Yue (流月)
- Yang Anqi as Zhen (針)
- Vivi Miao as Ming Le (明乐)
- Wang Jiawei as Ya Zhao (伢照)
- Wang Haixiang as Crow (烏鴉)
- Yang Liu as Zhao Ye (朝夜)
- Guo Xin as Qiu Tian Nian (裘天年)
- Chen Dacheng as Sun Tian (蓀田)
- Yang Changqing as Sun Tian's subordinate (蓀田手下)
- Hu Jingming as Nan He (南禾)
- Wang Xiangwen as Xiang Wen (湘聞)
- Wang Wensi as Lai Si (來思)
- Xue Yue as Xiao Xue (小雪)
- Lee Youlin as Businessman (珍奇商人)
- Gao Huayang as Cheater (人間騙子)

== Production ==
Guo Jingming's novel City of Fantasy sold over 1.5 million copies and ranked second in the bestseller's list. Since City of Fantasy's release in 2003, there have been plenty of early attempts to produce a movie adaption. However, the attempts failed as many felt that the novel's fictional universe was too complicated and massive to condense into a movie. The idea of a possible drama adaption of City of Fantasy had been formed since November 2014.

During Ice Fantasy's drama press conference held in August 2015, Hong Kong screenwriter Shen Zhining stated that the plot of the drama would have more stories, conflicts and background information compared to its book counterpart. The history of the tribes and their world's creation had been incorporated into the plot. The Fire Tribe's role in the story would also be expanded. On June 10, 2015, the creation of the script and preparations for filming were finished.

Academy Award-winning set designer Dan Hennah, who designed the sets for Lord of the Rings, was enlisted to design the sets for the production, which were inspired by the buildings, landscapes and other aspects of ancient China as well as western cultures. One particular set, called the "Endless Sea", was reported have an area size of 7,000 square meters, built using 500 tons of artificial snow. It had also been reported that about 300 million yuan was invested for the drama's production, with 2 million yuan to create the main palace alone. Furthermore, more than 100 craftsmen were enlisted to make 6,000 props, with many used in large-scale battle scenes. Around 70 to 80 percent of post-production was centered around the special effects and CGI. Youhug stated: "This should be an unprecedented investment in a domestic drama, we also hope to achieve good visual effect as much as possible."

Guo Jingming acts as the artistic and visual director for the production. Other notable players in production include Dong Cheng Guang as art director, A Ju for make-up guidance, Zhong Jiani as costume and prop designer, and Ma Yucheng as choreographer. The international visual effects company Pixomondo was also enlisted. Additionally, Boston Symphony Orchestra were also engaged to play the instrumental of the drama's background music. Shi Xiao Xi, the designer of the production's posters, is also a fan of the novel.

=== Casting ===
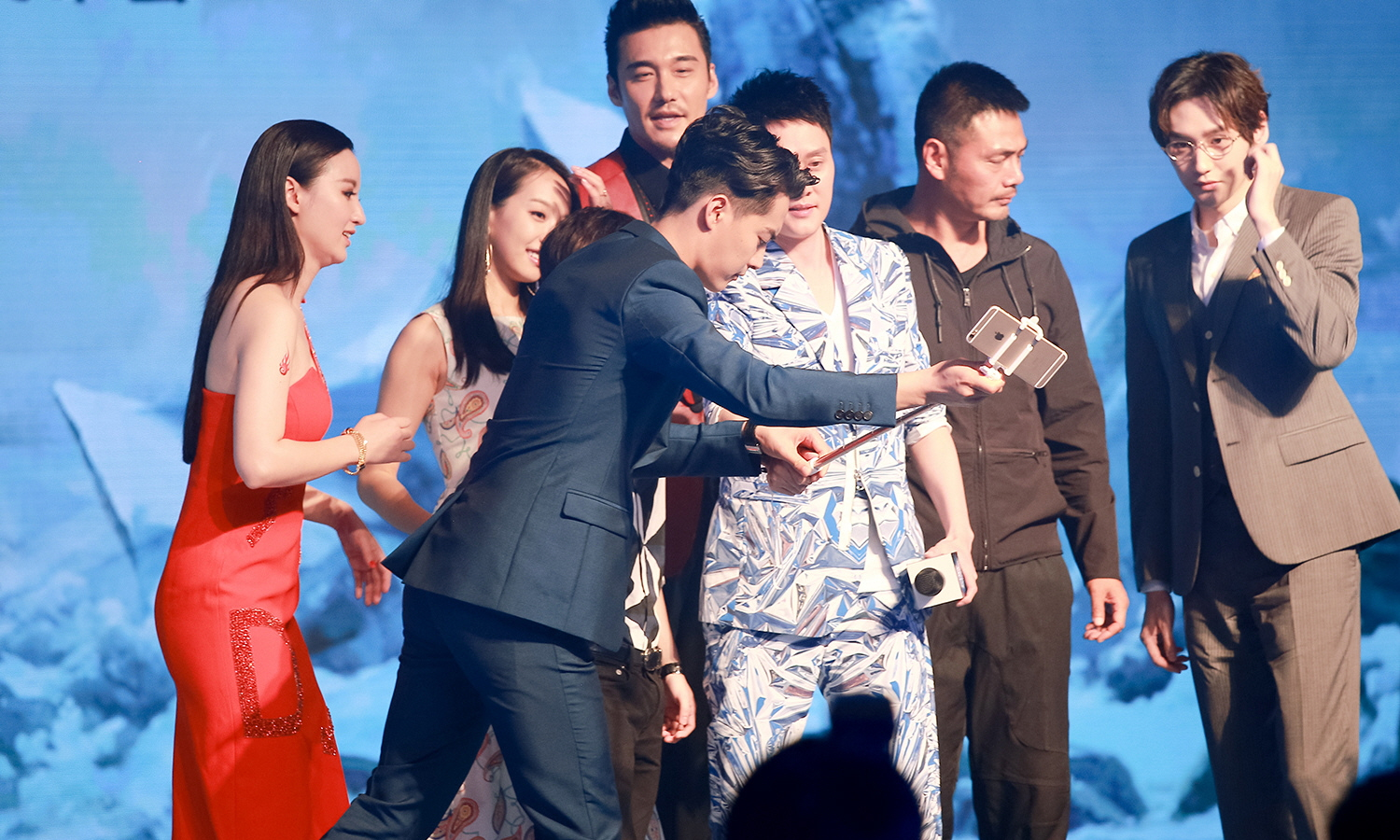
Cast of Ice Fantasy at the show's press conference in August 2015.

It was announced that Feng Shaofeng, Victoria Song, Ma Tianyu, and Zhang Meng would play the main characters, Ka Suo, Li Luo, Ying Kong Shi, and Yan Da. Supporting characters were later revealed through character posters that were posted on the drama's official Weibo account.

This is Feng Shaofeng and Victoria Song's second collaboration, after the Chinese remake of My Best Friend's Wedding.

=== Shooting ===
On August 12, 2015, Hennah and director Ju Jueliang, who is known for his martial arts films, brainstormed possible designs as well as visited a number of possible locations for filming. The drama was scheduled to shoot for six months, starting from August 16, 2015. Principal photography filming was held in Beijing, China, with location filming held in Chifeng, Inner Mongolia; Beijing and Hebei's Jinzuan Movie City. Filming finished in late February 2016 after lasting 187 days, and thereafter the drama entered into post-production phase.

=== Sponsorship ===
The production of Ice Fantasy was wholly sponsored by Pechoin. In addition, Pechoin's spokesperson Jay Chou, a globally acclaimed singer and songwriter, composed theme the song "Shouldn't Be (不该)" for the TV series.

"不该" (Shouldn't Be) by Jay Chou from 14th album Jay Chou's Bedtime Stories.

== Soundtrack ==
Ice Fantasy - Original Television Soundtrack (幻城电视剧原声音乐大碟)
No.	Title	Music	Length
1.	"Shouldn't Be (不該)"	Jay Chou and A-mei	4:50
2.	"Bottom of Heart (心底)"	Cindy Yen	4:05
3.	"Daydream (梦话)"	A-Lin	3:54
4.	"Love Will Be Restored (爱会还原)" (Ka Suo's theme song)	Ye Huaipei	3:57
5.	"Falling Pears (梨落" (Li Luo's theme song)	Cindy Yen (version 1), Victoria Song (version 2)	4:36
6.	"Love Like Cherry Blossoms (爱如樱)" (Ying Kong Shi's theme song)	Huang Yuxun (version 1), Ma Tianyu (version 2)	4:08
7.	"I Won't Let Go (我不放手)" (Yan Da's theme song)	Yu Ziqin (version 1), Zhang Meng (version 2)
8.	"Fish on the Other Shore (彼岸鱼)" (Lan Shang's theme song)	by Xian Peijin	4:18
9.	"Death of the Premature Lotus (莲殇)" (Lian Ji's theme song)	Kelly Yu	3:28
10.	"No Regrets (无悔)"	Celeste Syn

== Ratings ==
CMS50 Ratings
Episodes	Title	Broadcast date	Ratings (%)	Audience share (%)	Ranking
1-2	The Disaster of Ice Kingdom (雪国之劫)	July 24, 2016	0.994	5.13	2
3-4	The Disaster of Ice Kingdom (雪国之劫)	July 25, 2016	0.977	5.49	2
5-6	The Disaster of Ice Kingdom (雪国之劫)	July 26, 2016	0.920	4.88	1
7-8	A Dream of Forever (无尽之梦)	August 1, 2016	1.239	6.71	1
9-10	A Dream of Forever (无尽之梦)	August 2, 2016	1.057	5.778	1
11-12	The Last Puzzle (最后拼图)	August 9, 2016	1.118	5.491	1
13-14	The Last Puzzle (最后拼图)	August 10, 2016	0.947	4.527	1
15-16	A Game of Illusion (幻象之局)	August 15, 2016	0.884	4.491	2
17-18	A Game of Illusion (幻象之局)	August 16, 2016	0.983	4.608	1
19-20	The Throne of Ice (冰之宝座)	August 22, 2016	0.781	4.253	2
21-22	The Throne of Ice (冰之宝座)	August 23, 2016	0.945	4.989	2
23-24	A Predestined Battle (宿命之战)	August 29, 2016	0.711	4.060	2
25-26	A Predestined Battle (宿命之战)	August 30, 2016	0.809	4.674	1
27-28	The Princess Sings (公主吟唱)	September 5, 2016	0.649	4.071	2
29-30	The Princess Sings (公主吟唱)	September 6, 2016	0.691	4.101	1
31-32	A Life Exchange (生命交易)	September 12, 2016	0.707	4.242	1
33-34	A Life Exchange (生命交易)	September 13, 2016	0.670	3.929	1
35-36	Wedding Revenge (婚礼复仇)	September 21, 2016	0.641	3.997	1
37-38	Wedding Revenge (婚礼复仇)	September 22, 2016	0.710	4.399	1
39-40	The Actual Identity (身份真相)	September 28, 2016	0.660	4.107	2
41-42	The Actual Identity (身份真相)	September 29, 2016	0.580	3.572	1
43-44	The Heart of Lost City (心之迷城)	October 5, 2016	0.580	3.572	1
45-46	The Heart of Lost City (心之迷城)	October 6, 2016	0.688	3.743	1
47-48	The Lotus' Prophecy (隐莲预言)	October 12, 2016	0.522	3.374	2
49-50	The Lotus' Prophecy (隐莲预言)	October 13, 2016	0.600	3.825	1
51-52	The Return of an Old Friend (故人归来)	October 26, 2016	0.406	2.590	2
53-54	The Return of an Old Friend (故人归来)	October 27, 2016	0.463	3.014	2
55-56	Memory Reboot (重启记忆)	November 2, 2016	0.346	2.743	2
57-58	Memory Reboot (重启记忆)	November 3, 2016	0.357	2.459	2
59-60	Ending	November 9, 2016	0.513	3.242	1
61-62	Ending	November 10, 2016	0.477	3.199	1
Average			0.740	4.180	1

Nationwide Ratings
Episodes	Broadcast date	Ratings (%)	Audience share (%)	Rankings
1-2	July 24, 2016	1.00	6.53	2
3-4	July 25, 2016	1.00	6.83	1
5-6	July 26, 2016	0.94	6.38	1
7-8	August 1, 2016	1.16	7.92	1
9-10	August 2, 2016	0.96	6.62	1
11-12	August 9, 2016	1.09	6.84	1
13-14	August 10, 2016	0.95	6.09	1
15-16	August 15, 2016	0.97	6.27	1
17-18	August 16, 2016	1.25	7.79	1
19-20	August 22, 2016	0.90	6.39	1
21-22	August 23, 2016	1.06	7.02	1
23-24	August 29, 2016	0.76	5.45	1
25-26	August 30, 2016	0.77	5.77	1
27-28	September 5, 2016	0.44	3.57	2
29-30	September 6, 2016	0.50	4.11	1
31-32	September 12, 2016	0.49	3.92	2
33-34	September 13, 2016	0.50	3.8	2
35-36	September 21, 2016	0.42	3.62	2
37-38	September 22, 2016	0.50	4.25	2
39-40	September 28, 2016	0.50	4.23	1
41-42	September 29, 2016	0.50	4.23	2
43-44	October 5, 2016	0.76	5.50	1
45-46	October 6, 2016	0.76	5.50	1
47-48	October 12, 2016	0.44	4.02	2
49-50	October 13, 2016	0.46	3.97	1
51-52	October 26, 2016	0.30	2.72	2
53-54	October 27, 2016	0.29	2.57	2
55-56	November 2, 2016	0.21	2.4	2
57-58	November 3, 2016	0.30	3.04	2
59-60	November 9, 2016	-	-	-
61-62	November 10, 2016	0.28	2.18	1
Average		0.69	5.28	1

== Reception ==
The series received low ratings on Douban where it was criticized for its special effects, acting and storyline. However, it was a commercial success and has over 16 billion views online.

=== Awards ===
Year	Award	Category	Nominee	Result	Ref.
2017	Sina's Weibo Awards Night	Most Discussed TV Drama	N/A	Won	
2017	8th China TV Drama Awards	Most Popular Actress Award	Victoria Song	Won	
2017	Domestic TV Series	Most Popular Actress Award	Victoria Song	Won	
2017	Iqiyi TV and Movie Awards	Popular Actor of the Year	Victoria Song	Won	
2017	The Actors of China	Outstanding Actor	Ma Tianyu	Won	
2017	The Actors of China	Best Performance	Ma Tianyu	Nominated	
2017	The Actors of China	Best Performance	Feng Shaofeng	Nominated	

== International Broadcast ==
The drama was released on July 24, 2016 on Hunan Satellite Television Diamond independent broadcast theater, with 62 episodes. Its distribution rights were also bought by Viki globally and jointly by the 7 Chinese video-sharing websites: Tencent, iQiyi, Youku, LeTV, Mango TV, Astro (company), Sohu and PPTV.

- Philippines Airing in GMA 7 Last 2018 oversion
- Ice Fantasy also available in india his Hindi dubbed version on MX Player
- Thailand airing on Channel 7 with Thai dubbed from March 13 to August 15, 2017 at 9:30 a.m.
- Malaysia airing on Astro Quan Jia HD from October 12 to January 26 Monday to Thursday at 9:30pm

== Sequel ==
Produced by Youhug Media and Tencent Penguin Pictures, the modern sequel series of Ice Fantasy premiered on March 8 on Tencent Video. The series was directed by Zhou Linjao, and written by Shen Zhining and ran for 16 episodes. Primary cast members Feng Shaofeng, Ma Tianyu, Zhang Meng and Madina Memet starred as new versions of their characters, while Zhang Yuqi replaced Victoria Song, who made occasional appearances via stock footage and two surprise cameos. Supporting cast members Xu Ke (Xing Jiu) and Cheng Peipei (Feng Tian) reprised their supporting roles, while Chen Xinyu, Huang Deyi, and Lu Zizhen returned in new roles.

=== Synopsis ===
In the year 2020, the CEO of a technology company, Feng Suo, suddenly reclaims the powers of his distant previous incarnation, Ka Suo. At the same time, he meets Luo Luo, the reincarnation of Kingdom Guardian Li Luo. The two reignite the love that defined their past lifetimes and undergo a series of adventures. Tracking them is Ying Kong Shi - the original - and a reincarnation of Yan Da, determined to stop him before his plans for Feng Suo come to fruition. As the four work towards outrunning their respective destinies, old friends and new enemies emerge to write a new chapter of the Ice and Fire tribes' story.

=== Cast ===
- Feng Shaofeng as Feng Suo / Ka Suo
- Zhang Yuqi as Luo Luo
- Ma Tianyu as Ma Tian Chi / Ying Kong Shi
- Zhang Meng as Yan Zhu / Yan Da
- Xu Ke as Xing Jiu
- Madina Memet as Ming Na
- Cai Mingtao as Ge Ningyue
- Chen Xinyu as Yang Dan
- Wu Diwen as Qin Mo
- Lu Zizhen as JoJo
- Bian Cheng as Jian Ling
- Wang Ziwei as Cheng Tong
- Huang Deyi as Qin Chu
- Cheng Peipei as Fiona
- Victoria Song as Li Luo
- Xu Jiao as Xing Gui
