= Mike Sui =

American-Chinese actor

Mike Sui (simplified Chinese: 隋凯; traditional Chinese: 隋凱; pinyin: Suí Kǎi) is a comedic actor and host in China who became famous for his "12 Beijingers" viral video released on April 27, 2012.

Sui was born in Ann Arbor, Michigan to a Chinese father and American mother, and grew up in Michigan and Beijing. He attended Madison West High School in Madison, Wisconsin. After moving to Beijing in 2005, he taught English and acted on Chinese television shows and commercials.

Sui's first film role was in 2010's Welcome to Shama Town. He appeared alongside Stephon Marbury in the 2014 musical I Am Marbury.

== Filmography ==
- The Wandering Earth (流浪地球) (2019)
- Wished (反转人生) (2017)
- Papa (洛杉矶捣蛋计划) (2016)
- Money and Love (2016)
- Gone With the Time (再见我们的十年) (2015)
- Love, At First (2015)
- Women Who Flirt (撒娇女人最好命) (2015)
- My Old Classmate (同桌的你) (2014)
- Happy Hotel (乐翻天) (2012)
- Fearless (热血街头) (2012)
- Single No More (光棍终结者) (2011)
- Welcome to Shamatown (决战刹马镇) (2010)
