= Love, At First... =

Love, At First…
- Poster
- 爱之初体验
- Directed by: Tao Hai
- Starring: Juck Zhang; Xiaofeng Li; David Wu; Yao Zhang; Jingjing Qu; Yase Liu; Thomas Price; Mike Sui; Cecilia Yip
- Production companies: Shanghai Jinse Tianxia Entertainment; Beijing Galloping Horse Media; Dawei Media Investment; National Trust; China Film Group Corporation; Shanghai AsiaTV Art Center; Zhejiang Wishart Pictures; Shanghai Yiguan Media
- Distributed by: China Film; Eastern Mordor; Tianjing Yinhe Media; Dianping.com
- Release date: 7 August 2015
- Running time: 98 minutes
- Country: China
- Language: Mandarin
- Box office: CN¥3.2 million

Love, At First… (Chinese: 爱之初体验) is a 2015 Chinese romantic comedy film directed by Tao Hai. The film was released on 7 August 2015.

== Cast ==
- Juck Zhang
- Xiaofeng Li
- David Wu
- Yao Zhang
- Jingjing Qu
- Yase Liu
- Thomas Price
- Mike Sui
- Cecilia Yip

== Reception ==
The film earned CN¥3.217 million at the Chinese box office.
