= Jia (EP) =

JIA

EP by Meng Jia
- Released: 7 April 2017
- Recorded: 2016
- Genre: C-pop
- Length: 9:34
- Label: Banana Culture Music

JIA is the first solo EP by Meng Jia after her departure from the Korean group Miss A. The EP was initially limited to a digital release, however after requests from fans it was later released physically featuring three songs and a DVD.
"Drip" is a hip hop song with a video featuring choreography by Jonte Moaning and Hwayoung Kim, while "Who's That Girl", written by lyricist Meng Jia and Matthew Yen, is an expression of her own transformation and growth during her time in Miss A and now in her solo career. Both songs were composed by Brian Lee (who has worked with Justin Bieber and Lady Gaga). "Candy" is an EDM song with lyrics about love.

== Track listing ==
No.	Title	Music	Writer(s)	Length
1.	"Drip"	Brian Lee		2:38
2.	"Who's That Girl"	Brian Lee	Meng Jia, Matthew Yen	2:44
3.	"Candy"	Shinsadong Tiger, LE	Shinsadong Tiger, Matthew Yen	3:12
Total length:				9:34

== Charts ==
Chart	Song name	Peak position	Ref.
Billboard China V Chart (17 December 2016)	Drip	8	
Billboard China V Chart (21 January 2017)	Who's That Girl	6	
Billboard China V Chart (22 April 2017)	Candy	14	
