= New Dragon Gate Inn (2019 TV series) =

2019 Chinese TV series

- 新龙门客栈
- Genre: Wuxia
- Based on: Dragon Gate Inn by King Hu
- Screenplay by: Wang Jiawei
- Directed by: Zhu Shaojie
- Starring: Ma Ke; Stephy Qi; Shen Mengchen; Bao Jianfeng; Chen Xiaodong; Liu Yaoyuan
- Country of origin: China
- Original language: Mandarin
- No. of episodes: 40

Production
- Executive producers: Gao Xinjie; Jin Jin
- Production locations: Hengdian World Studios; Fujian
- Production company: Zhejiang Qiangshi Media

New Dragon Gate Inn (新龙门客栈) is a 2019 Chinese wuxia television series adapted from the 1992 Hong Kong film of the same title, which itself is a remake of the 1967 Taiwanese film Dragon Gate Inn by King Hu. It is directed by Zhu Shaojie and starred Ma Ke, Stephy Qi, Shen Mengchen, Bao Jianfeng, Chen Xiaodong, and Liu Yaoyuan.

== Cast ==
- Ma Ke as Zhou Huai'an
- Stephy Qi as Jin Xiangyu
- Shen Mengchen as Qiu Moyan
- Bao Jianfeng as Cao Shaoqin
- Chen Xiaodong as the Prince
- Liu Yaoyuan as Ying Guanzhen
- Ye Ziqi as Hojo
- Yu Bo as Wang Chao
- Du Junze as Xiao Fangfei
- Zhang Huizhong as Jia Ting
- Luo Huiyu as Yang Yao
- Ma He as You Dianzi
- Xiao Can as Sai Hua

== Production ==
Principal photography started in January 2017 in Hengdian World Studios and wrapped in June 2017.
