= Song of Phoenix =

- Drama poster
- Genre: Historical; Romance
- Based on: Song of Phoenix by Liang Zhenhua
- Written by: Liang Zhenhua; Zhang Hui; Hu Yating; Qin Wen
- Directed by: Chang Hsiao-cheng; Ting Yang-kuo
- Starring: Ma Ke; Viann Zhang; Qiao Zhenyu; Jackson Yi
- Country of origin: China
- Original language: Mandarin
- No. of seasons: 1
- No. of episodes: 72

Production
- Producer: Liang Zhenhua
- Running time: 45 mins
- Production companies: Perfect World (Beijing) Pictures Co. Beijing Flying Youth Media; Beijing United International Media Design

Original release
- Network: Hunan TV
- Release: April 28 – June 10, 2017

Song of Phoenix (Chinese: 思美人) is a 2017 Chinese television series adapted from Liang Zhenhua's namesake novel, focusing on the legendary life of great Chinese poet Qu Yuan from the Warring States Period (475-221BC). It stars Ma Ke as the titular protagonist, alongside Viann Zhang, Qiao Zhenyu and Jackson Yi from TFBoys. It aired on Hunan TV from 28 April to 10 June 2017.

== Synopsis ==
It tells the story of Qu Yuan, a Chinese poet and government official known for his accomplishments during the Warring States Era. In the fictionalized dramatization, Qu Yuan falls in love with a slave girl named Mo Chou Nu. Their love is a forbidden romance, which is complicated by palace politics and the affairs of the nation. Motivated by his love for his country, Qu Yuan embarks on a difficult endeavor to save his people.

== Cast ==
- Ma Ke as Qu Yuan
  - Jackson Yi as young Qu Yuan
- Viann Zhang as Mo Chou Nu
- Qiao Zhenyu as King Huai of Chu
- Li Zifeng as Qu You
- Liang Tian as Zhao Bixia
- Liu Yun as Zheng Xiu
- Lan Xi as Queen of Nan
- Li Yuxuan as Zhang Yi
- Peng Bo as Zhuang Qiao
- Ning Xin as Concubine Tian
- Li Enxi as Ying Sheng
- Ding Yingying as Qing'er
- Kelly Niu Tien as Empress Dowager
- Gallen Lo as King Huiwen of Qin
- Wu Yang as Luo Lan
- Yin Zhusheng as Qu Buoyong
- Wu Qianqian as Bo Hui
- Huang Xiaowan as Mi Bazi
- Lan Ge as Cai Wei
- Wang Xinyu as Liu Waizui
- Dou Jinhan as Mu Yi

== Soundtrack ==
思美人原声带
No.	Title	Singer	Length
1.	"Song of Phoenix (思美人)" (Opening theme song)	Jane Zhang	5'06"
2.	"Sigh of Phoenix (思美人兮)"	Ma Ke / Qiao Zhenyu / Jin Wenqi	4'37"
3.	"Li Sao" (Ending theme song)	Jackson Yi	4'26"

== Reception ==
Though the series premiered with 2.18% ratings and ranked first in its time slot, its ratings rapidly dropped in the next few episodes. It was criticized for distortion of history, absurd plot and characters as well as poor CG effects. Despite the criticism, Phoenix was popular among teenagers and young viewers in their early 20s and the series averaged 18 million views per episode. The series earned a 3.3 out of more than 13,000 user reviews.

=== Ratings ===
- Highest ratings are marked in red, lowest ratings are marked in blue

Hunan Satellite TV CSM52 City ratings
Air date	Episode #	Ratings (%)	Audience share (%)	Rank
April 28, 2017	1	2.110	7.05	2
April 29, 2017	2	0.550	1.99	5
April 30, 2017	3-4	0.805	2.78	2
May 1, 2017	5-6	0.782	2.68	5
May 2, 2017	7-8	0.674	2.29	5
May 3, 2017	9-10	0.789	2.65	5
May 4, 2017	11-12	0.786	2.68	4
May 5, 2017	13	0.624	2.08	5
May 6, 2017	14	0.625	2.10	5
May 7, 2017	15-16	0.907	2.98	4
May 8, 2017	17-18	0.684	2.32	5
May 9, 2017	19-20	0.717	2.49	5
May 10, 2017	21-22	0.684	2.41	4
May 11, 2017	23-24	0.721	2.44	3
May 12, 2017	25-26	0.865	2.88	3
May 13, 2017	27	0.619	2.18	4
May 15, 2017	28-29	0.893	2.98	3
May 16, 2017	30-31	0.888	3.07	3
May 17, 2017	32-33	0.917	3.17	3
May 18, 2017	34-35	0.861	2.98	3
May 19, 2017	36	0.633	2.27	4
May 20, 2017	37	0.655	2.32	3
May 21, 2017	38	0.898	3.00	3
May 22, 2017	39-40	0.866	2.81	3
May 23, 2017	41-42	0.889	2.90	3
May 24, 2017	43-44	0.841	2.81	3
May 25, 2017	45-46	0.861	3.00	3
May 26, 2017	47	0.434	1.61	7
May 27, 2017	48	0.488	1.82	7
May 28, 2017	49-50	0.694	2.39	4
May 29, 2017	51-52	0.802	2.76	4
May 30, 2017	53-54	0.818	2.74	4
May 31, 2017	55-56	0.893	2.99	3
June 1, 2017	57-58	0.716	2.48	4
June 2, 2017	59	0.564	2.01	7
June 3, 2017	60	0.425	1.47	9
June 4, 2017	61-62	0.674	2.16	5
June 5, 2017	63-64	0.807	2.64	4
June 6, 2017	65-66	0.730	2.50	4
June 7, 2017	67-68	0.706	2.46	5
June 8, 2017	69-70	0.791	2.76	4
June 9, 2017	71	0.560	2.03	6
June 10, 2017	72	0.644	2.34	5
