= Zai Jian Wo Men De Shi Nian =

- 再见我们的十年
- Directed by: Sun Hao
- Starring: Guo Jiaming; Liu Yun; Mike Sui; Pan Shuangshuang; Miki Yeung; Li Yanan; Wang Xiaokun; Denny Huang
- Release date: June 12, 2015
- Running time: 92 minutes
- Country: China
- Language: Mandarin
- Box office: CN¥1.87 million (China)

Zai Jian Wo Men De Shi Nian (Chinese: 再见我们的十年) is a 2015 Chinese romantic comedy film directed by Sun Hao. It was released in China on June 12, 2015.

== Cast ==
- Guo Jiaming
- Liu Yun
- Mike Sui
- Pan Shuangshuang
- Miki Yeung
- Li Yanan
- Wang Xiaokun
- Denny Huang

== Reception ==
By June 13, the film had earned CN¥1.87 million at the Chinese box office.
