= Madina Memet =

Chinese actress (born 1987)

- مەدىنە مەمەت
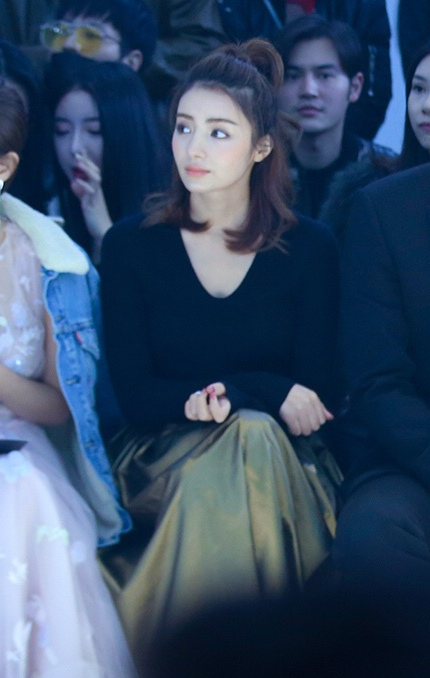
- Memet in 2016
- Born: September 10, 1987 (age 38); Ürümqi, Xinjiang, China
- Education: Beijing Shengji Art Academy
- Occupation: Actress
- Years active: 2011–present
- Agent: Shanghai Youhug Media Co. Ltd.
- Spouse: Jiang Chao (m. 2019)
- Children: 2

Chinese name
- Simplified Chinese: 麦迪娜·买买提
- Traditional Chinese: 麥迪娜·買買提
Transcriptions
Standard Mandarin
- Hanyu Pinyin: Màidínà Mǎimǎití

Uyghur name
- Uyghur: مەدىنە مەمەت
Transcriptions
- Siril Yëziqi: Мадина Мәмәт

Madina Memet (Uyghur: مەدىنە مەمەت; Chinese: 麦迪娜·买买提; pinyin: Màidínà Mǎimǎití; born 10 September 1987) is a Chinese actress of Uyghur ethnicity who first rose to prominence in 2011 for playing the Fragrant Concubine in the television series New My Fair Princess. Her breakthrough role came when she played Lan Shang in the epic fantasy television drama Ice Fantasy in 2016.

== Early life ==
Madina Memet was born in Ürümqi, Xinjiang, on September 10, 1987, she is the youngest of five children. As a child, she liked dancing. In 1998, she was accepted to Beijing Shengji Art Academy and graduated in 2003. After graduation, she was assigned to Xinjiang Arts Theatre Troupe.

== Career ==
Memet had her first experience in front of the camera in 2010, and she was chosen to act as a support actress as the Fragrant Concubine in New My Fair Princess, a television series based on the novel by the same name by Chiung Yao.

In January 2013, she starred in historical series Heroes in Sui and Tang Dynasties. In May, she featured in palace drama Legend of Lu Zhen. In June, she played the female lead role in the comedy television series Little Big Soldier, alongside Xiao Shenyang and Xu Lu. In August, she starred in Flowers in Fog, adapted from Chiung Yao's novel of the same title.

Memet's first film role was an unaccredited appearance in the film Ex-Files (2014). She then co-starred in the shenmo television series The Investiture of the Gods, based on Xu Zhonglin's novel of the same name. In April, she starred in Palace 3: The Lost Daughter, a historical romance television series by Yu Zheng.

In February 2015, Memet featured in Peter Pau's fantasy action adventure film Zhong Kui: Snow Girl and the Dark Crystal. She also featured in martial arts film The Final Master, where she received increased recognition for her acting.

In 2016, she starred in the epic fantasy television drama Ice Fantasy and gained more popularity for her role as the mermaid princess. In December, she was cast in the shenmo television series Ghost Catcher Zhong Kiu’s Record.

In 2017, Memet starred in the historical romance drama General and I. She reprised her role as Lan Shang in the modern sequel of Ice Fantasy, Ice Fantasy Destiny.

In 2018, Memet starred in romance drama Summer's Desire, based on Ming Xiaoxi's novel. She also starred in action comedy film Kung Fu League.

In 2019, Memet starred in the historical epic Chong Er's Preach, playing Li Ji.

== Filmography ==
=== Film ===
Year	English title	Chinese title	Role	Notes
2014	Ex-Files	前任攻略	Ling Ling	
2015	Zhong Kui: Snow Girl and the Dark Crystal	钟馗伏魔：雪妖魔灵	Huang She	
2015	The Final Master	师父	Tea server	
2018	Kung Fu League	功夫联盟		

=== Television series ===
Year	English title	Chinese title	Role	Notes/Ref.
2011	New My Fair Princess	新还珠格格	Fragrant Concubine (Han Xiang)	
2012	Sweet Home	我家有喜	The manger	
2013	Heroes in Sui and Tang Dynasties	隋唐演义	Wang Meiren	
2013	Legend of Lu Zhen	陆贞传奇	Du Mei'er	
2013	Little Big Soldier	大兵小将	Princess Yue	
2013	Crazy for Palace	我为宫狂	Xixi	
2013	Flowers in Fog	花非花雾非雾	Bess	
2014	The Investiture of the Gods	封神英雄榜	Yu Qing	
2014	Palace 3: The Lost Daughter	宫锁连城	Bai Le	
2015	The Investiture of the Gods 2	封神英雄榜2	Yu Qing	
2015	Warm Blood	热血	Natascha	
2015	Nursing Our Love	家和万事兴	Shan Shan	
2016	Destined Guy	真命天子	Hua Rong	
2016	Ice Fantasy	幻城	Lan Shang	
2017	Ice Fantasy Destiny	幻城凡世	Ming Na	Web series
2017	General and I	孤芳不自赏	Yang Feng	
2018	Summer's Desire	泡沫之夏	Shen Qiang	
2018	Ghost Catcher Zhong Kiu’s Record	钟馗捉妖记	Ying Su	
2019	Chong Er's Preach	重耳传	Li Ji	
TBA	Detective Dee	秋官课院之狄仁杰浮世传奇	Dugu Ying'er	

== Discography ==
Year	English title	Chinese title	Album	Notes
2018	"Just Nice"	恰好	Kung Fu League OST	
