= Ma Ke (actor) =

Chinese actor

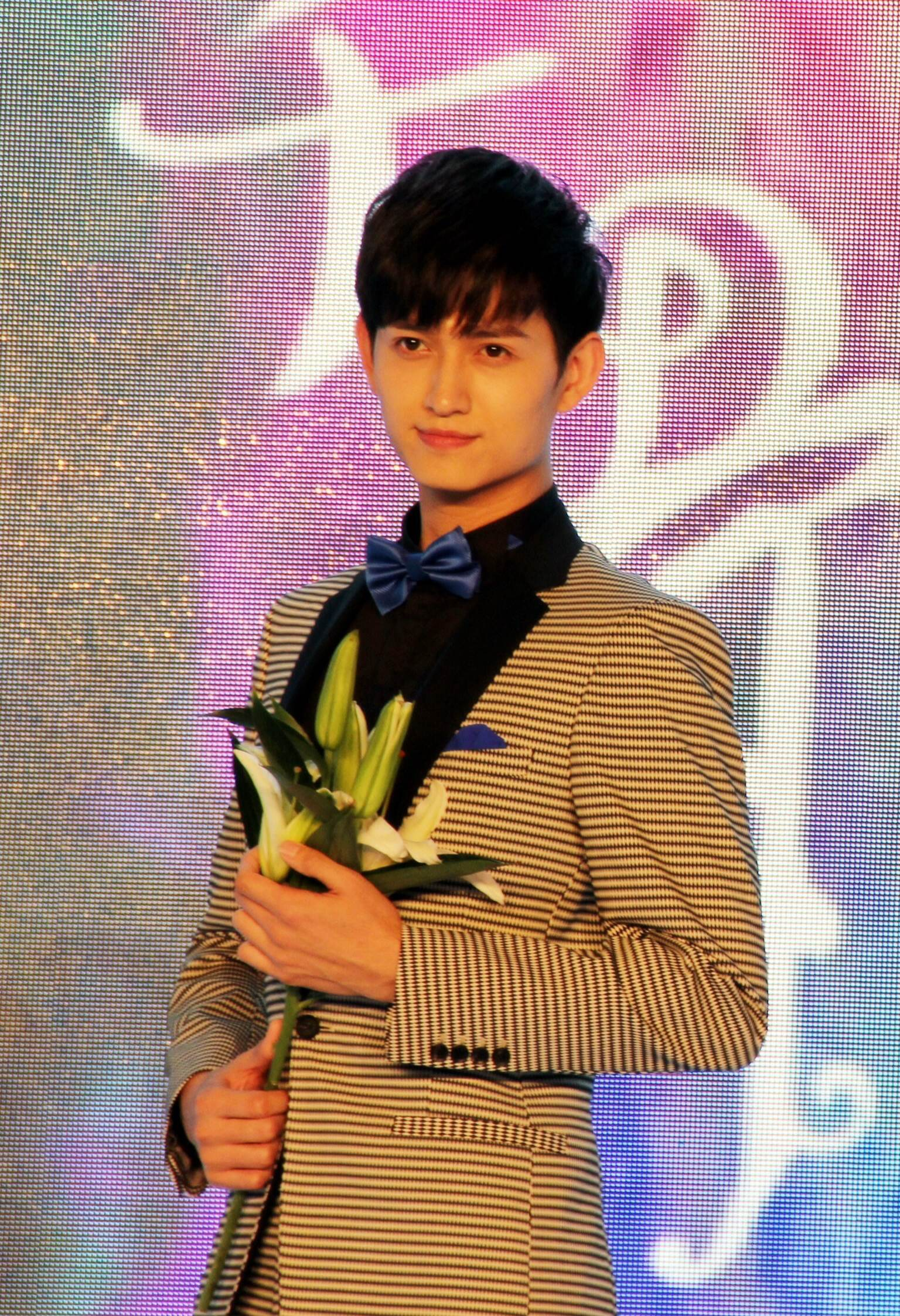
- Ma in 2015
- Born: 9 February 1990 (age 36); Shangqiu, Henan, China
- Education: Central Academy of Drama
- Occupation: Actor
- Years active: 2001–present
- Agent: Ciwen Media
- Spouse: Wang Danni

Chinese name
- Traditional Chinese: 馬可
- Simplified Chinese: 马可
Transcriptions
Standard Mandarin
- Hanyu Pinyin: Mǎ Kě

Ma Ke (Chinese: 马可, born 9 February 1990) is a Chinese actor.

== Career ==
He first appeared in the television series Sun Zhongshan (2001), playing young Pu Yi. Ma is best known for his breakthrough role as "Sha Jiejie" in the fantasy romance drama The Journey of Flower (2015), which propelled him to fame in China. He is also known for his role as Qu Yuan in the historical drama Song of Phoenix (2017).

== Filmography ==
=== Film ===
Year	English title	Chinese title	Role	Ref.
2003	Cat and Mouse	老鼠爱上猫	Chang Xi	
2009	Boy and Girl	男生女生	Wu Mian	
2010	Class 3 and Class 5	三班五班	Wu Mian	
2012	My Daddy My Father	拼爹年代	Xue Tianyi	
2012	The Sword Identity	倭寇的踪迹	Gan Gang	
2012	Different Pains	夜来香	Sun Weijie	
2013	Oriental Chinese Dream	东方中国梦	Li Rui	
2014	Let's Shimmy	让我们西米吧	Zhu Senlin	
2017	Please Keep Away	请勿靠近	Ah Nan	
2019	Over Again	回到过去拥抱你	Gao Silin	

=== Television series ===
Year	English title	Chinese title	Role	Notes/Ref.
2001	Sun Zhongshan	孙中山	young Puyi	
2002	Love Dictionary	愛情寶典	young Han Shixun	
2002	Love Legend of the Tang Dynasty	大唐情史	young Li Zhi	
2003		金剑雕翎	young Liu Jinling	
2003	Silent Tears	女人不再沉默	Chi Yi	
2004	Empty House	空房子	Wu Sichao	
2005	Home with Kids	家有儿女	Xiao Xue's boyfriend	Cameo, Episode 4
2005		绝对计划	Ah Ding	
2005	Let's Dream	圆梦	Zhong Yunan	
2007	Women Don't Cry	女人不哭	Hai Tian	
2010	Boy's Diary	男生日记	Wu Mian	
2011	Sweet New Business	甜蜜的新事业	Xiang Tianyi	
2013	Miss Assassin	枪花	Qi Wen	
2014	The Ferryman	灵魂摆渡	Blind guy	Cameo
2014	Legendary Heroes	英雄祭	Soldier	Cameo
2015	When Apple Meets Cherry	水果总动员	Apple	
2015	The Journey of Flower	花千骨	Sha Qianmo	
2015	My Three Fathers	爸爸父亲爹	Suo Yang	
2015	Hua Xu Yin: City of Desperate Love	华胥引之绝爱之城	Wu Xiong	
2015	The Journey of Flower 2015	花千骨2015	Sha Qianmo	
2015	The Ferryman 2	灵魂摆渡2	Lu Zhe	
2016	Revive	重生之名流巨星	Du Yunxiu	
2016	So Young	致青春	Xu Kaiyang	Special appearance
2016	Hot Girl	麻辣变形计	Liang Dawei	
2017	The Journey	寻找前世之旅	Ya Long	
2017	Song of Phoenix	思美人	Qu Yuan	
2017	Love of Aurora	极光之恋	Li Juntai	
2019	New Dragon Gate Inn	新龙门客栈	Zhou Huaian	
2020	Forward Forever	热血同行	General Song	Cameo
TBA	You Are Always With Me	你永远在我身边	Xiao Mang	
TBA	Insect Detective	破茧	Wen Bai	

== Discography ==
=== Singles ===
Year	English title	Chinese title	Album	Notes
2015	—N/a	两生缘	The Journey of Flower 2015 OST	
2016	"Revive"	重生	Revive OST	
2017	"Sigh of Phoenix"	思美人兮	Song of Phoenix OST	

== Awards and nominations ==
Year	Award	Category	Nominated work	Result	Ref.
2015	Asian Influence Awards Oriental Ceremony	Popularity Award	—N/a	Won	
2016	8th China TV Drama Awards	Best New Actor	The Journey of Flower	Won	
2016	5th iQIYI All-Star Carnival	Most Anticipated TV Actor	—N/a	Won	
