= Akini Jing =

Akini Jing 朱婧汐
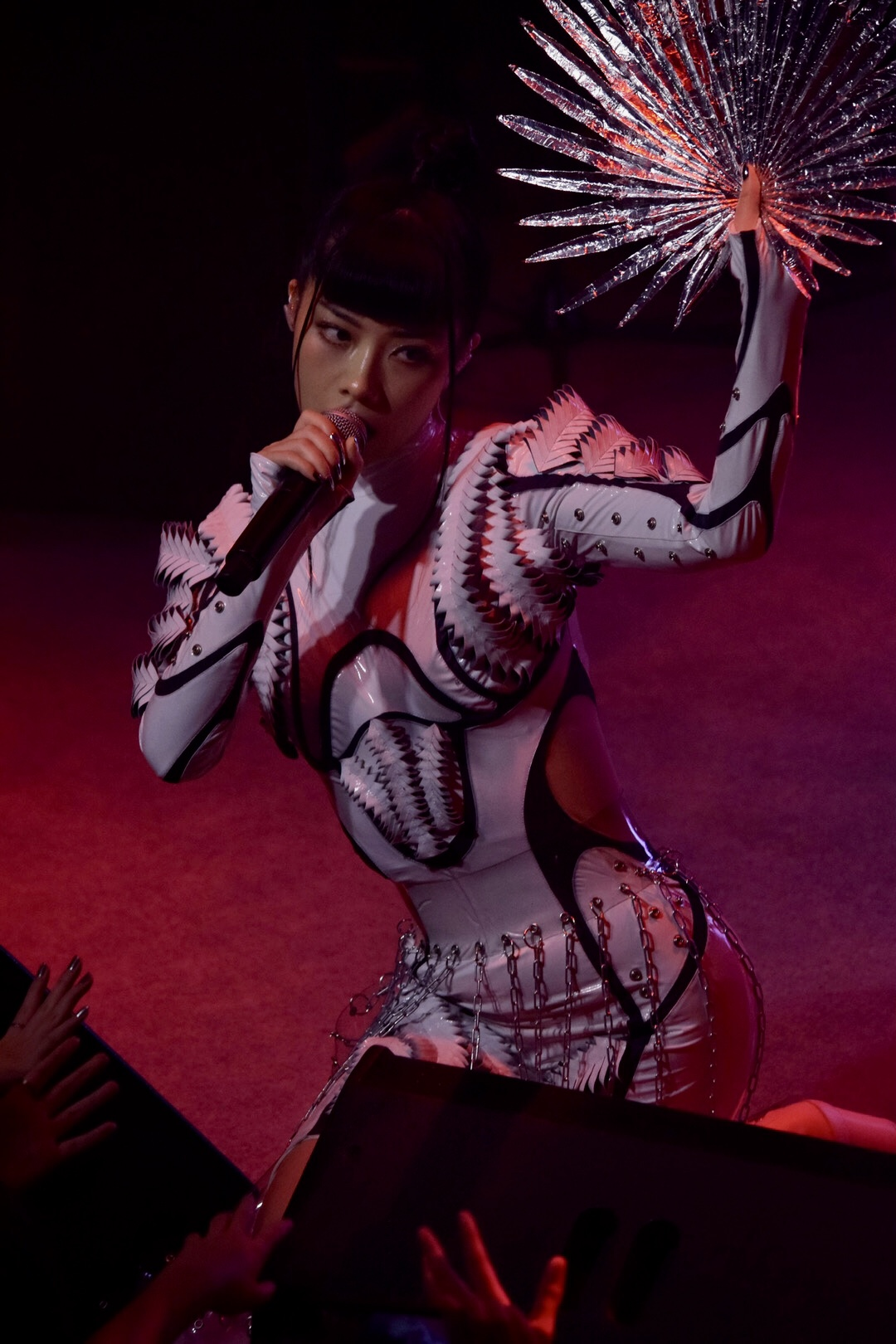

Background information
- Also known as: JING, Zhu Jingxi, Zhu Jing, June Zhu
- Born: Yue Hanzan 月罕瓒; April 18, 1988 (age 38); Yunnan, China
- Genres: Electronica, dream pop, folk
- Occupations: Singer, songwriter, record producer
- Instrument: Vocals
- Years active: 2004–present
- Labels: Universal Music, Akini Music, 88rising
- Website: Weibo, Instagram

Akini Jing or Zhu Jingxi (Chinese: 朱婧汐; born April 18, 1988), born Yue Hanzan (月罕瓒), is a Chinese singer, songwriter, and music producer of Dai ethnicity from Yunnan. She released her first solo album in 2008 in Taiwan under Universal Music. She released her second solo album in September 2014. In 2018, with her single Shadow, she became the first Chinese artist to enter the Billboard Dance Club Chart Top 40.

In 2019, she began her career as Akini Jing, a cyborg with a unique and impersonal perspective. In 2020, she participated in Sisters Who Make Waves, started up her music label, Akini Music, and released her cyborg concept album, Plastic Heaven. In 2022, she released a concept album, Endless Farewell.

In March 2023, she officially announced her association with 88rising, followed by the release of the single Pump Up.

== Discography ==
=== Studio albums ===
- 2008: At the End of the Sky (天空的边际)
- 2014: Equine Dreams (以梦为马)
- 2020: Plastic Heaven (塑胶天堂)
- 2022: Endless Farewell (永无止境的告别)
- 2024: VILLAIN (反派角色)

=== EP ===
- 2004: Shangri-La 香格里拉 (June Zhu debut single EP)
- 2013: She 她 (June Zhu single EP)
- 2015: Before Tonight 夏的最后一日 (Jingxi Zhu single EP)

=== Singles ===
- 2013: 为爱追寻, 茄子
- 2016: Heading To The Dawn
- 2017: Love Sick, 刺猬爱孔雀
- 2018: Shadow, Ice Cream Run
- 2019: 火焰, 双星, The Last of Human, ENEMY, 上山采茶, Crescent
- 2020: 愿我, FaceTime Love, Love City, Feeling, 生生不息, 圈圆
- 2021: HURTS!, 科技兑现想象，云梦三千年，中国李宁Eureka, If You Feel Lonely Tonight
- 2022: 冲浪, GOLDEN PAGODA, Glow in the Dark, Goodbye
- 2023: Pump Up, Call Me Shadow, Black Widow

== Songwriting Credits ==
- I see - Xiaotong Guan
- 旷梦 - Silence Wang
- 时差 On Call - LuHan
- 不再 - Jeff Chang
- 某时某刻 Catch me when I fall - LuHan
- 致爱 Your Song - LuHan
- 勋章 Medals - LuHan
- 诺言 Promises - LuHan
