= New Pants =

Chinese pop-punk band

- Origin: China
- Genres: New wave, Punk rock, Disco, Pop rock
- Years active: 1996–present
- Label: Modernsky (1997-present)
- Members: Peng Lei (Millionare Peng); Pang Kuan; Zhao Meng; Hayato Kitō
- Past members: Liu Bao; Shang Xiao; Li Yanfei

New Pants (Chinese: 新裤子乐队; pinyin: xinkuzi yuedui) is a Chinese rock band. The band initially formed three members, lead singer Peng Lei, bass Liu Baobao and drummer Shang Laugh, who met in high school (1995) and formed the band "Metal Workshop Physical Master". Peng Lei as lead singer and guitarist, Liu Bao as bassist, Shang Xiao as drummer. In 1996, the band recorded their first single, "I'm OK". Established in 1996, New Pants has become one of the most representative bands influenced by new wave in China, being considered as one of the pioneers of the movement in China. Current band members are: Peng Lei (vocals), Pang Kuan (keyboard), Zhao Meng (bass) and Hayato Kitō (drums). In 1998, the band released their first music album New Pants. In 2000, the band released their second album, Disco Girl. In 2002, and the band released their third album We Are Automatic.

In 2019, New Pants participated in a variety show called "The Big Band" on iQiyi and won the championship (Hot 1). In 2020, a version of their song "Do You Want To Dance? 你要跳舞吗" was featured in the music program called We Are Blazing 炙热的我们 2020, performed by SNH48 Group.

== Discography ==
Albums:

- 1998 新裤子 (New Pants)
- 2000 Disco Girl
- 2002 我们是自动的 (We Are Automatic)
- 2006 龙虎人丹 (Dragon Tiger Panacea)
- 2008 野人也有爱 (Equal Love)
- 2009 Go East
- 2011 SEX DRUGS INTERNET
- 2016 生命因你而火热 (Life’s Hot Because of You)
- 2021 爱 广播 飞机 (Love, Broadcast, Aircraft)

== Music videos ==
- "SEX DRUGS INTERNET"
- "People without ideals are not sad"
- "Do you want to dance"
- "Stop asking me what is disco"
- "Dragon Tiger Panacea"
- "Life's Hot Because of You"
