= Baby Zhang =

Chinese singer and actress

Zhang Hanyun
- Born: 9 April 1989 (age 37); Deyang, Sichuan, China
- Other names: Kristy Zhang; Baby Zhang
- Occupations: Singer, actress
- Years active: 2004–present
- Awards: Runner-up; Super Girl 2004

Chinese name
- Traditional Chinese: 張含韻
- Simplified Chinese: 张含韵
Transcriptions
Standard Mandarin
- Hanyu Pinyin: Zhāng Hányùn
- Musical career
- Genres: Mandopop

Zhang Hanyun (born 9 April 1989), also known as Baby Zhang or Kristy Zhang, is a Chinese singer and actress. At the age of 16, Kristy rose to fame as a runner-up of the singing contest Super Girl 2004.

== Early life ==
Zhang was born and raised in Deyang, Sichuan and is an only child. She graduated from high school in Beijing in 2006. Zhang is able to speak Mandarin, Cantonese, and conversational English.

== Career ==
Zhang released her debut album, I am just Zhang Hanyun, in 2005 and her second album, Power of Young in 2007.

== Discography ==
=== Albums ===
Album	Songs
Baby Zhang 我很张含韵; July 2005	1. 放假了 (Holiday...Finally); 2. 精灵 (Precise); 3. 一个人长大 (Growing Up Alone); 4. 考试中 (Examination); 5. 梦游记 (Sleep-Walking legend); 6. 妈妈 我爱你 (Mama, I love you); 7. 青蛙公主 (Frog Princess); 8. 酸酸甜甜就是我 (Sweet and Sour is me); 9. 星期天 ("Day"day) (Pun on Monday, Tuesday etc); 10. 想唱就唱 (Sing if you want to Sing)
Baby Zhang 我很张含韵(预售版); July 2005	1. 放假了 (Holiday....Finally); 2. 考试中 (Examination); 3. 妈妈我爱你 (Mama, I love you); 4. 和大家 Say Hello (Say Hello to Everyone); 5. 录音棚中的故事 (Story in the Studio); 6. 拍 MV 的辛苦 (Filming MV's are difficult); 7. 后悔做艺人么？ (Regret being an artist?); 8. 我的"青蛙王子" (My Frog prince); 9. 放假最想做的事情 (What I want to do during the Holiday); 10. 说发型 (Hair Style); 11. 给首张专辑的自我评语 (Critical of my own album); 12. 最感谢的人 (The one I want to Thankyou); 13. 对父母说的话 (Talking to my Parents); 14. 说可爱 (Saying Cute); 15. 说官网 (Saying Official Sites); 16. 给 Fans 的话 (Message to my Fans)
Baby X'mas 新年好; December 2005	CD: 1. 最想念的季节 圣诞賀年单曲 (Most memorable Season) (Christmas/New year solo); 2. 追梦 中央电视台((梦里人))卡通主题曲 (Chasing Dreams) (CCTV Series, "Dream Person" Cartoon theme); VCD: 1. 最想念的季节 MV (Most memorable Season); 2. 酸酸甜甜就是我 MV (Sweet and Sour is Me); 3. 想唱就唱 MV (Sing if you waant to Sing); 4. 放假了 MV (Holiday....Finally); 5. 妈妈 我爱你 MV (Mama, I lovee you)
Baby Zhang 1st Album 一人一梦 (Hong Kong Special Version); April 2006	1. 最想念的季节 (Most memorable Season); 2. 哎呀呀 (Mamamia); 3. 精灵 (Precise); 4. 想唱就唱 (Sing if you Want to sing); 5. 追梦 (Chasing Dreams); 6. 追梦星期天 (Chasing dreams on "Day"day); 7. 考试中 (Examination); 8. 妈妈我爱你 (Mama, I love you); 9. 酸酸甜甜就是我 (Sweet and Sour is me); 10. 梦游记 (Dream Walking Legend); 11. 一个人长大 (Growing up Alone)
Power of Young 青春无敌; February 6, 2007	1. 公主的魔法項鏈 (Magical Necklace of a Princess); 2. 閃亮亮 (Bright and Flashing); 3. Baby Baby; 4. 夢想太空號 (Dream of Space); 5. 白色 (White); 6. 青春無敵 (Unbeatable youth); 7. 北鼻與底兒 (Northern Nose vs South Son); 8. 星星的眼睛 (Stars of Eyes); 9. 哎呀呀 (Mamamia); 10. 只要我長大 (As Long as I grow Up)
One Person One Dream 一人一梦; October 4, 2017	

=== Singles ===
Year	English title	Chinese title	Role	Notes
2013	"Love Always Knocks on the Wrong Door"	爱神总是敲错门	Love in Spring OST	
2013	"Singing When We Are Young"	初恋未满	Singing When We Are Young OST	
2013	"Take Care of Yourself"	照顾自己	Because Love is Sunny OST	
2013	"Who am I to You"	我是你的谁	Because Love is Sunny OST	
2016	"Love Sickness Rhapsody"	相思赋	Treasure Raider OST	
2016	"Ask Goodbye"	问别	Treasure Raider OST	
2016	"Border Town Prodigal"	边城浪子	Border Town Prodigal OST	
2016	"Don't Give Up Your Dream"	有梦别放下	—N/a	Promotional song for Super Girl 2016

== Filmography ==
=== Film ===
Year	English title	Chinese title	Role	Notes
2013	Singing When We Are Young	初恋未满	Dong Qiuqiu	
2023	Delicious Romance	爱很美味	Fang Xin	

=== Television series ===
Year	English title	Chinese title	Role	Notes
2007		浪击天涯	Jiang Zhu	
2009	Dragon Phoenix Lucky	龙凤呈祥	Jiang Xixi	
2010	Andox & Box	安逗与黑仔	Huhu / Youyou	
2012		奇异家庭	Du Xiaoban	
2013	Because Love is Sunny	因为爱情有多美	Qiqi	
2016	Treasure Raider	新萧十一郎	Xiao Gongzi	
2016	Princess of Lanling King	兰陵王妃	Yuan Qingsuo / Duanmu Ling	
2018	The Story of Minglan	知否？知否？应是绿肥红瘦	Sheng Shulan	
2019	Chong Er's Preach	重耳传奇	Qi Jiang	
2021	Delicious Romance	爱很美味	Fang Xin	
2022	The Grand Merchants	一代洪商	Liu Tian Juan	
2022	The Lady in Butcher's House	玉面桃花总相逢	Hu Jiao	
TBA	The Love of Hypnosis	南烟斋笔录	Dai Wanqing	
TBA	Her World	她的城	Ying Xiao Mei	

=== Variety show ===
Year	English title	Chinese title	Role	Notes
2020	Sisters Who Make Waves	乘风破浪的姐姐	Cast member	

== Awards ==
Year	Awards	Category	Nominated work	Notes
2005	CNTV's Music King Hit Global Chinese Music Award	Most Popular Newcomer	—N/a	
2005	CNTV's Music King Hit Global Chinese Music Award	Top 10 Songs	"Sweet and Sour is also Me"	
2006	Metro Radio Mandarin Hits Music Awards Presentation	Mandarin Hit Song	"Yayaya"	
2006	Metro Radio Mandarin Hits Music Awards Presentation	Outstanding Singer Chosen by the Media	—N/a	
2006	Metro Radio Mandarin Hits Music Awards Presentation	New Singer Award	—N/a	
2006	Sprite Music Awards	Best Newcomer	—N/a	
2006	Music Radio China Top Chart Awards	Most Promising Newcomer (Mainland China)	—N/a	
2006	Music Radio China Top Chart Awards	Campus Popularity Award	—N/a	
