= Li Miao (Three Kingdoms) =

Chinese Shu Han state official (died 234)

- 李邈

General Who Pacifies Han (安漢將軍)
- In office ?–?
- Monarch: Liu Shan
- Chancellor: Zhuge Liang

Army Adviser under the Imperial Chancellor (丞相參軍)
- In office ?–?
- Monarch: Liu Shan
- Chancellor: Zhuge Liang

Administrator of Qianwei (犍為太守)
- In office ?–?
- Monarch: Liu Bei / Liu Shan
- Chancellor: Zhuge Liang

Personal details
- Born: Unknown Santai County, Sichuan
- Died: 234 Chengdu, Sichuan
- Relations: Li Chao (brother); Li Shao (brother); unnamed younger brother
- Occupation: Official
- Courtesy name: Hannan (漢南)

Li Miao (died late 234), (Note: The Sanguozhi recorded that Zhuge Liang fell sick and died in the 8th lunar month of the 12th year of the Jianxing era in Liu Shan's reign. This month corresponds to 11 September to 10 October 234 in the Julian calendar. As Li Miao died after Zhuge Liang, he must have died in or after September 234; the year ends on 5 Feb 235.) courtesy name Hannan, was an official of the state of Shu Han during the Three Kingdoms period of China. He previously served under the warlord Liu Zhang and later Liu Bei in the late Eastern Han dynasty.

== Life ==
Li Miao was from Qi County (郪縣), Guanghan Commandery (廣漢郡), which is in present-day Santai County, Sichuan. He initially served as the Chief of Niubei County (牛鞞縣; present-day Jianyang, Sichuan) under Liu Zhang, the Governor of Yi Province (covering present-day Sichuan and Chongqing).

In 214, after the warlord Liu Bei seized control of Yi Province from Liu Zhang and became the new Governor, he appointed Li Miao as an assistant officer (從事) in his office. In the following year, on the first day of the lunar new year, when Li Miao came to greet Liu Bei, he used the opportunity to tell Liu Bei:

"(Liu Zhang) saw you, General, as a fellow member of the imperial clan. That was why he sought your help in resisting a common enemy. Now, he has lost power before the enemy has been defeated. I, (Li) Miao, believe that it is improper of you, General, to take control of this province."

Liu Bei then asked him: "Since you believe it is improper of me to do so, then why don't you help (Liu Zhang)?" Li Miao replied: "It's not because I don't want to help him. It's because I don't have the ability to." When Liu Bei's subordinates urged their lord to execute Li Miao for his audacity, Zhuge Liang stepped in and managed to convince Liu Bei to spare Li Miao.

After the fall of the Eastern Han dynasty in 220, Li Miao went on to serve in the state Shu, founded by Liu Bei in 221, during the Three Kingdoms period. He consecutively held the positions of Administrator of Qianwei (犍為太守), Army Adviser under the Imperial Chancellor (丞相參軍), and General Who Pacifies Han (安漢將軍).

In 228, after Zhuge Liang executed Ma Su for his failure at the Battle of Jieting, Li Miao told Zhuge Liang:

"When the Qin state pardoned Mengmingshi, he assisted them in gaining dominance over the Xirong. (Note: Mengmingshi (孟明視) was a general of the Qin state in the Spring and Autumn period. He lost the Battle of Xiao against the Jin state in 627 BCE. However, Duke Mu of Qin pardoned him and allowed him to continue serving as a general. Mengmingshi later fought in battles against the Xirong and helped Qin gain dominance over them.) When the Chu state executed Ziyu, they declined for two generations. (Note: Ziyu was the courtesy name of Cheng Dechen, a prime minister of the Chu state in the Spring and Autumn period. King Cheng of Chu forced him to commit suicide after the Chu state lost the Battle of Chengpu against the Jin state in 632 BCE. The Chu state declined during the reigns of King Cheng and his son King Mu until King Mu's son King Zhuang came to the throne in 613 BCE.)"

As a result, Li Miao fell out of Zhuge Liang's favour and was sent back from the frontline to the Shu capital Chengdu. After Zhuge Liang died in 234, the Shu emperor Liu Shan declared a three-day mourning period. During this time, Li Miao wrote a memorial to Liu Shan as follows:

"It might not have been Lü Lu (Note: Lü Lu (呂祿) was an official of the early Western Han dynasty and a nephew of Empress Lü. He was executed in 180 BCE after Empress Lü's death and the downfall of the Lü clan.) and Huo Yu's intentions to commit treason. In the same way, Emperor Xuan might not have desired to be seen in a negative light for executing the Huo clan. (Note: Huo Yu (霍禹) was a general of the Western Han dynasty and a son of Huo Guang. He was executed along with the rest of his clan in 66 BCE for plotting to overthrow Emperor Xuan; Huo Guang's wife was involved in the poisoning of Emperor Xuan's first empress Xu Pingjun.) While the subjects fear the ruler's might, the ruler also fears that his subjects' glory will outshine his. That leads to tensions between both sides. (Zhuge) Liang had full control over a mighty army and he had such aggressive ambitions. As the saying goes, 'the five great subjects of a state should not be located in its borders.' (Note: This saying comes from the Zuo Zhuan. The "five great subjects of a state" refer to five classes of people in a state: (1) the crown prince, (2) the ruler's brothers, (3) the ruler's sons, (4) the ruler's grandsons, and (5) long-serving and highly influential officials. They should not be located at the borders so that the ruler can keep a close watch on them, and prevent them from becoming powerful enough to pose a threat to the ruler.) I have always been worried about the security of our State. Now that Zhuge Liang is dead, our people will be safe and there will be no more wars at the western border. Everyone will rejoice."

Liu Shan turned furious after reading Li Miao's memorial and ordered his execution.

== Family ==
Li Miao had three brothers: Li Chao (李朝), Li Shao (李邵), and an unnamed younger brother.

Li Chao (李朝), whose courtesy name was Weinan (偉南), started his career as an Officer of Merit (功曹) in his native Guanghan Commandery before he was nominated as a xiaolian (civil service candidate) for higher positions. He later served as the Prefect of Linqiong County (臨邛縣; present-day Qionglai, Sichuan) and as an aide-de-camp under Liu Bei. In 219, when Liu Bei declared himself "King of Hanzhong" following his victory in the Hanzhong Campaign, Li Chao was the one who wrote the declaration for him. Li Chao participated in the Battle of Xiaoting against Wu and died in 222 in Yong'an (永安; present-day Fengjie County, Chongqing) after the battle.

Li Shao (李邵), whose courtesy name was Yongnan (永南), served as a scribe and assistant officer under Liu Bei after the latter seized control of Yi Province from Liu Zhang in 214. During the Jianxing era (223–237) of Liu Shan's reign, Li Shao became an assistant official under Zhuge Liang. In 225, when Zhuge Liang went on his southern campaign in the Nanzhong region, he left Li Shao behind in Chengdu to serve as an assistant officer in the headquarters office (治中從事). Li Shao died in the same year.

Li Miao had an unnamed younger brother who was as famous as his brothers for his talent. However, he died at a relatively young age. Li Miao's three brothers were collectively nicknamed the "Three Dragons of the Li Family" (李氏三龍). Pei Songzhi noted that Li Miao himself was not considered one of the "Dragons of the Li Family", probably because of his offensive and rude behaviour.

== See also ==
- Lists of people of the Three Kingdoms
