= Xi (state) =

Early Chinese petty state

Xi 息
- 1122 BC–Between 684 and 680 BC
- Capital: Xi County
- Common languages: Chinese language
- Government: Marquessate
- History
  - Established: 1122 BC
  - Disestablished: Between 684 and 680 BC

Xi (Chinese: 息; pinyin: Xī) was a Chinese vassal state during the Shang and Zhou dynasties and the Spring and Autumn period (1600 – 475 BCE) ruled by members of the Jī family (姬). Sometime between 680 and 684 BCE Xi was annexed by the State of Chu and ceased to exist as an independent state.

== History ==
In 712 BCE the State of Xi sent a punitive expedition against the State of Zhèng. At that time, Duke Zhuang of Zheng had for many years repeatedly attacked large States such as Song and Wey amongst others and Zhèng was at the height of its military power. The expedition resulted in decisive defeat for Xi, and the Zuo Zhuan commentary on the expedition criticises Xi's overestimation of its own strength. Nonetheless, some scholars believe that Xi's expedition indicated its military was quite powerful and a match for Zheng.

In 684 BCE, Duke Ai of Cai was rude to Xī Guī, wife of the Duke of Xī. As a result, the Duke of Xī asked the State of Chŭ to feign an attack on his own country so that when the State of Cài came to the rescue, Chŭ could strike the State of Cài and humiliate Duke Ai of Cài. King Wen of Chu agreed, attacked Cài and his army captured the Duke.

Although he harboured a deep grudge, in front of King Wen, Duke Ai praised Xī Guī's beauty. Consequently, King Wén overthrew the State of Xī and married Xī Guī. The two sons she bore subsequently became the Chŭ kings Du Ao and King Cheng of Chu. King Wén of Chŭ doted on Xī Guī and in 680 BCE, at her behest, overthrew the State of Cài. King Wen subsequently set up the counties of Shen and Xi in the areas of the former eponymous states.

During the State of Chǔ's struggle for hegemony in the Spring and Autumn period, Xi County played an important role. At the Battle of Chengpu, Chǔ Prime minister Cheng Dechen did not lead the main Chǔ army but a smaller force composed primarily of troops from the counties of Shēn and Xī. As a result, Chéng Déchén lost the battle whereupon King Chéng of Chŭ said ‘’If you return home, what would the bereaved elders of Xi and Shen do?’’

In 585 BCE, the State of Jìn attacked the State of Cài. Chǔ sent troops from Shēn and Xī to assist Cài. The high-ranking military leaders of Jìn knew that if they won this battle it would only mean the defeat of Shēn and Xī counties, not the entire State of Chǔ, but that if they lost it would be a major humiliation, so the army decided to retreat. Gu Jiegang points out that since the two counties of Shēn and Xī had enough troops and were sufficiently powerful to deal with the State of Jin's army, it is clear that the counties were both rich and populous.

== See also ==
- (In Chinese) Yang Bojun, Annotated Zuo Zhuan ISBN 7-101-00262-5
- (In Chinese) Tong Shuye, Research on the Zuo Zhuan ISBN 7-101-05144-8
