= Human sacrifice in ancient Chinese culture =

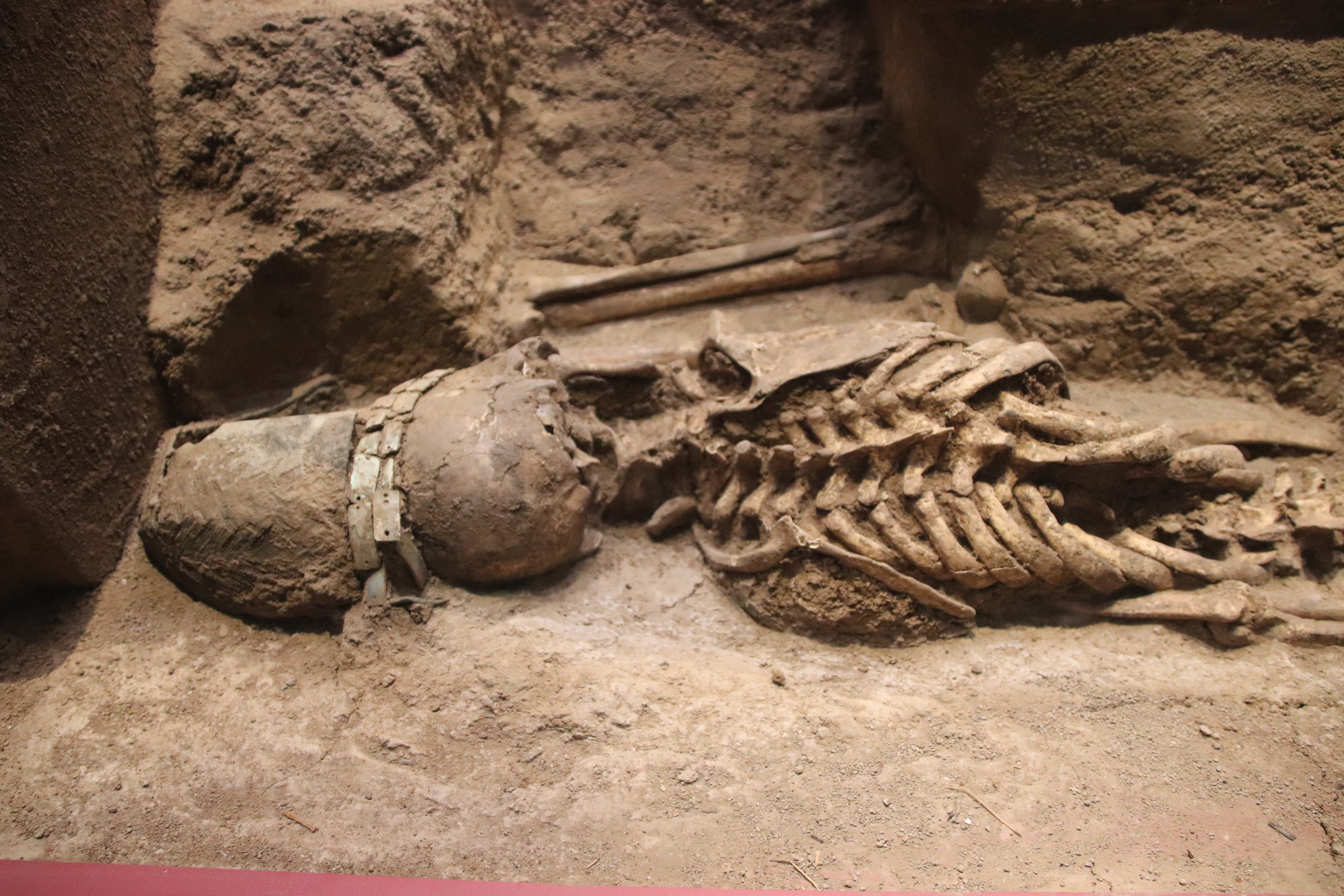
Shang chariot burial with human sacrifice.

Human sacrifice was a significant part of ancient Chinese culture, especially during the Shang dynasty. Unlike many of the notorious Mesoamerican rituals, such as the Aztec nextlahualli, Chinese sacrificial rituals were often carried out simply as spectacles for those high in power and influence. Chinese historian Dr. Keren Wang states that "[T]he Shang king would demonstrate to the supreme deity of their devoutness through the specular spilling of sacrificial human blood". The propaganda used to justify these rituals can be captured in a single phrase, one that could be found in places of religion and politics in ancient China, "The great national concerns are sacrifice and war". Chinese historian Xinxu Liu calls this phrase a "[S]tatus symbol for rulers".

== Rise of human sacrificial rituals in ancient China ==
It is uncertain when exactly human sacrificial rituals began taking place in China, but they definitely occurred during the Shang dynasty, which lasted from approximately 1600 BC to 1046 BC and is the first verified Chinese dynasty.

The claim regarding sacrifices in the Shang dynasty is corroborated by many tomb findings, including the people in Tomb No. 1 in Su-fü t'un, in the province of Shandong, who were placed to have their heads turned towards the coffin chamber. A similar arrangement of civilian bodies has been reported in Tomb No. 1001 in Hsi Pei Kang, in the Anyang region. It has also been noted that six skeletons in a Ch'iu-wan burial have been identified in terms of age and sex, to which it was discovered that several victims were children, and none were elderly.

== Carrying tradition from the Shang dynasty to the Zhou dynasty ==
When the Shang dynasty was violently overthrown by the Zhou dynasty in 1046 BC, many of the traditions and customs from the previous dynasty persevered, despite attempts of erasure. The poem "Huang Niao", or "Yellow Bird", was created to protest human sacrifice, presumed to be created by civilians.

It is debatable whether or not the sacrificial rituals were ever strictly made illegal. Some sources suggest that the Zhou rulers strongly condemned these practices, but other evidence points towards rulers such as Duke Xian of Qin having people killed for religious ceremonies.

== Scale and victims ==
Human sacrifice reached a particularly large scale during the late Shang dynasty. Oracle bone inscriptions mention at least 14,197 human sacrificial victims, although some inscriptions may record the same sacrificial event more than once. Archaeological and historical estimates suggest that more than 13,000 people were sacrificed at Yinxu over its approximately 200 years of occupation. Excavations have found large numbers of victims in sacrificial pits and royal tombs, including 1,178 human skeletons in 191 pits excavated in 1976 and 225 victims associated with the large royal tomb M1001.

The victims were not limited to servants or members of the ruler's household. Many of those mentioned in Shang inscriptions were war captives, particularly people identified as Qiang, although the precise identities and origins of all victims remain uncertain. Isotopic studies of sacrificial victims from Yinxu have likewise found that many were non-local, consistent with their having been brought to the capital from other regions before being sacrificed.

== Ancient Chinese sacrificial bronzes ==
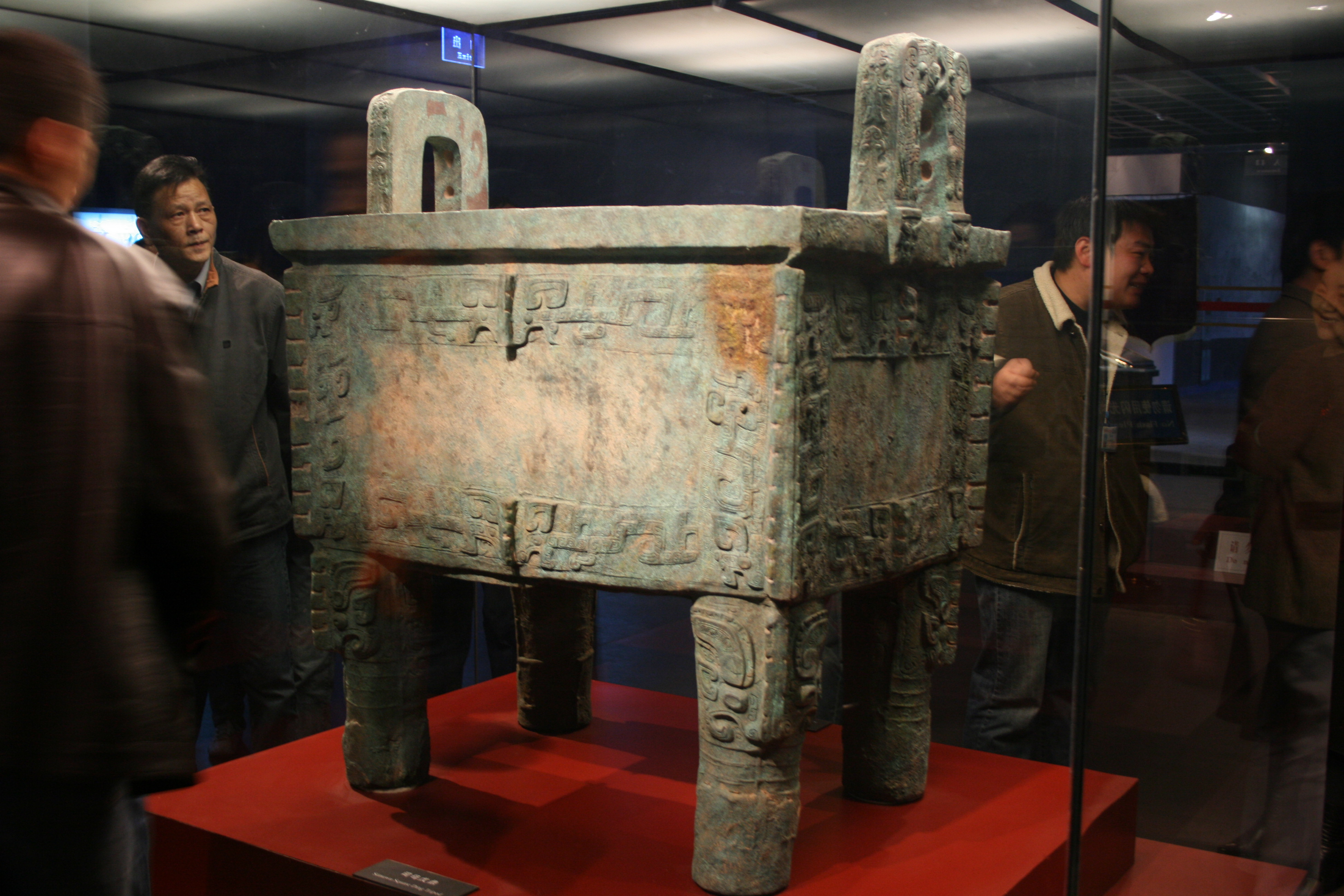
The Houmuwu ding, an ancient Chinese bronze used for sacrificial purposes.

The Chinese Bronze Age was a time period which yielded a large, lasting impact on Chinese culture. A great number of pieces of ancient Chinese bronzeware have been unearthed, and a large number of these artifacts are vessels. Ancient Chinese bronzes are celebrated for their artistic value and the casting technology used to make them.

=== The Houmuwu ding ===
An example of an ancient Chinese bronze used for sacrificial purposes is the Houmuwu ding. The vessel has taotie markings along its rectangular body.

== Funerary human sacrifice ==
Archaeological evidence indicates that funerary human sacrifice in China dates back to the late Neolithic period. At the Lushanmao site in Yan'an, dating to about 2460–2130 BC, human remains in tomb shafts have been interpreted as sacrificial victims associated with elite burials. Similar evidence of funerary human sacrifice has also been found at sites associated with the Qijia culture and in later Bronze Age China.

In early China, people from the household or retinue of a high-ranking person, including servants, slaves, concubines and guards, could be sacrificed when he died. This practice is often described by archaeologists as retainer sacrifice, while Chinese sources use terms including "人殉" and "殉葬". It was associated with the belief that the dead would need attendants in the afterlife.

A Shang dynasty chariot burial pit at the Royal Tombs Area in Yinxu, featuring accompanying human victims (charioteers or guards) intended to serve the deceased elites in the afterlife.

By the Spring and Autumn period, funerary human sacrifice is well documented in written sources. In the state of Qin, Duke Wu was reportedly buried with 66 people in 678 BC, while Duke Mu was buried with 177 people in 621 BC, including three senior officials. The practice was officially abolished in Qin in 384 BC by Duke Xian of Qin.

Funerary human sacrifice was revived under the early Ming dynasty, particularly in the imperial harem. When the Hongwu Emperor's second son died, two of his concubines were sacrificed and interred with him; when Hongwu himself died in 1398, forty minor consorts were sacrificed with him. After the death of the Yongle Emperor in 1424, more than thirty palace women, including sixteen concubines, were likewise forced to die with him. The practice was abolished for Ming emperors and princes by the Tianshun Emperor in 1464.

Human sacrifice associated with rulers' burials also persisted among the early Manchus. Following Nurhaci's death in 1626, his principal consort Lady Abahai was forced to commit suicide and was buried with him, with historical sources giving differing accounts of the circumstances of her death. Human sacrifice involving servants or slaves persisted into the early Qing period until it was prohibited under the Kangxi Emperor in 1673.

== See also ==
- Houmuwu ding
- Shang dynasty
- Bronze Age
- Human sacrifice
