= Liu =

- Liú surname in traditional Chinese characters
- Pronunciation: Liú ([ljǒʊ]) (Pinyin); Lau4; Lâu (Pe̍h-ōe-jī)
- Language: Chinese, Vietnamese, Korean

Origin
- Language: Old Chinese

Other names
- Variant forms: Liú (Mandarin); Lau (Cantonese, Hokkien); Lieu (Shanghainese); Lưu (Vietnamese); Yoo, Ryu (Korean); Ryu (Japanese); Liew (Malaysia)
- See also: Yoo (Korean surname); Lau (surname)

Liu (simplified Chinese: 刘; traditional Chinese: 劉; /ljoʊ/ or /ljuː/) is an East Asian surname. pinyin: Liú in Mandarin Chinese, Lau^{4} in Cantonese. It is the family name of the Han dynasty emperors. The character 劉 originally meant 'battle axe', but is now used only as a surname. It is listed 252nd in the classic text Hundred Family Surnames. Today, it is the 4th most common surname in mainland China as well as one of the most common surnames in the world.

== Distribution ==
In 2019 Liu was the fourth most common surname in mainland China. Additionally, it was the most common surname in Jiangxi province. In 2013 it was found to be the 5th most common surname, shared by 67,700,000 people or 5.1% of the population, with the province with the most people being Shandong. Outside mainland China, Liu is also the 8th most common surname in Taiwan, the 30th most common in South Korea, and is present in smaller numbers in Vietnam.

== Origin ==
One source is that they descend from the Qí (祁) clan of Emperor Yao. For example, the founding emperor of the Han dynasty (one of China's golden ages), Liu Bang (Emperor Gaozu of Han) was a descendant of Emperor Yao.

Another origin is from the Jī (姬) clan of King Qing of Zhou. For example, Duke Kang of Liu, the youngest son of King Qing of Zhou, founded the State of Liu and his descendants took state names as surname.

== History ==
Liu was a place name in ancient China (located in present-day Henan). The Liu family name has two main origins from this place name.

Kong Jia, the fourteenth king of the Xia dynasty, was given a male and a female dragon as a reward for his obedience to the god of heaven; yet he could not train them, so he hired a dragon-trainer named Liu Lei (劉累), who had learned how to train dragons from Huanlong. Liu Lei was a descendant of Emperor Yao, and won the admiration of King Kong Jia for his skill at dragon-rearing. To reward Liu Lei, King Kong Jia granted him a place called Liu as his fiefdom. Liu Lei took the name of his fief as his family name. One day, the female dragon died unexpectedly, so Liu Lei secretly chopped her up, cooked her meat, and served it to the king, who loved it so much that he demanded Liu Lei to serve him the same meal again. Since Liu Lei had no means of procuring more dragon meat, he fled the palace. Liu Lei was the first person surnamed Liu in Chinese history, and his descendant Liu Bang founded the Han dynasty.

During the Zhou dynasty, King Ding of Zhou granted the fiefdom of Liu to his younger brother, Ji Jizi (姬季子). Ji Jizi also took Liu as his family name. Eventually, Liu became a state, and Ji Jizi ruled the State of Liu as Duke Kang of Liu. After more than a hundred years under the rule of the Liu family, the State of Liu was destroyed by the central government of the Zhou dynasty.

Liu was the ruling family of the Han dynasty, one of the most prosperous and influential empires in Chinese history. The Han dynasty was founded by Liu Bang. Later, Emperor Liu Che helped expand the Han dynasty even further, ushering in a golden age for China.

The Han dynasty had 30 emperors all surnamed Liu; it was one of the Chinese dynasties with the most emperors. The Han dynasty lasted 400 years, making it one of the longest-lasting Chinese empires in history. The Han is what gives its name to the Han people as well as Han characters / Hanzi / Chinese characters.

Even after the Han dynasty, several Liu continued to hold power within China, including Liu Bei of Shu Han (whose exploits were described in the Records of the Three Kingdoms), as well as the Han-Zhao, Liu Song, Later Han, Northern Han and Southern Han dynasties.

Over history, several non-Han Chinese people have adopted the Liu surname, including Xiongnu and Turkic peoples.

== Historical figures ==
- Duke Kang of Liu, son of King Qing of Zhou and founder of the State of Liu
- Liu Bang, Founder of the Han dynasty as Emperor Gaozu of Han
- Liu Jiao (King of Chu), the younger brother of Liu Bang and famous scholar
- Liu Ying, Second Emperor of the Han dynasty
- Liu Heng, Fifth Emperor of the Han dynasty
- Liu Qi, Sixth Emperor of the Han dynasty
- Liu Che, Seventh Emperor of the Han dynasty known for expanding the Han dynasty to its fullest extent and for a long reign of 54 years
- Liu An (King of Huainan), advisor to his nephew, Emperor Wu of Han. Best known for editing the (139 BCE) Huainanzi compendium of Daoist, Confucianist, and Legalist teachings
- Liu Sheng (King of Zhongshan), the direct ancestor of the Shu Han emperors, had more than 120 sons
- Liu Xiang, government official, scholar, and author of who lived during the Han dynasty
- Liu Fuling, Eight Emperor of the Han dynasty
- Liu He, Emperor of the Han dynasty
- Liu Xun, Tenth Emperor of the Han dynasty
- Liu Shi, Eleventh Emperor of the Han dynasty
- Liu Ao, Twelfth Emperor of the Han dynasty
- Liu Xin, Thirteenth Emperor of the Han dynasty
- Liu Kan, Fourteenth Emperor of the Han dynasty
- Liu Xin, astronomer, historian, and editor during the Han dynasty
- Liu Xuan, Emperor Gengshi of the Han dynasty
- Liu Yan (Xin dynasty), general and older brother of Liu Xiu
- Liu Xiu, The restorer of the Han dynasty and the founding emperor of the Eastern Han dynasty
- Liu Dai, politician during the Eastern Han dynasty
- Liu Du (warlord), warlord and politician during the Eastern Han dynasty
- Liu Yan (Han dynasty warlord), politician and warlord during the Eastern Han dynasty
- Liu Biao, warlord during the late Eastern Han dynasty
- Liu Zhuang, Emperor of the Han dynasty
- Liu Da, Emperor of the Han dynasty
- Liu Zhao, Emperor of the Han dynasty
- Liu Hu, Emperor of the Han dynasty
- Liu Bao, Emperor of the Han dynasty
- Liu Zhi, Emperor of the Han dynasty
- Liu Hong, Emperor of the Han dynasty
- Liu Xie, Last emperor of the Han dynasty
- Liu Bei (161–223), Founding emperor of Shu Han
- Liu Shan (207–271), Second emperor of Shu Han
- Liu Hong, astronomer and mathematician of the Han dynasty
- Liu Hui, mathematician during the Three Kingdoms period
- Liu Yan (Shu Han), general during the Three Kingdoms period
- Liu Ji (Three Kingdoms), official of Eastern Wu
- Liu Kun, general, poet and musician of the Western Jin
- Liu Yuan, First emperor of Han-Zhao
- Liu He, Second emperor of Han-Zhao
- Liu Cong, Third emperor of Han-Zhao
- Liu Can, Fourth emperor of Han-Zhao
- Liu Yao, Fifth emperor of Han-Zhao
- Empress Liu E, Empress of Han-Zhao
- Liu Yu, Founder of the Liu Song as Emperor Wu of Liu Song
- Liu Yilong, Emperor Wen of Liu Song
- Empress Liu, Empress of Northern Song
- Liu Sanjie, folk music singer during the Southern Song dynasty
- Liu Zhiyuan, Founding emperor of Later Han
- Liu Chong, Founding emperor of Northern Han
- Liu Yan, Founding emperor of Southern Han
- Liu Rengui, chancellor and general of the Tang dynasty
- Liu Xiangdao, chancellor of the Tang dynasty
- Liu Ji (general), general of the Tang dynasty
- Liu Ji (Tang chancellor), chancellor of the Tang dynasty
- Liu Yan (Tang dynasty), Chinese economist and politician during the Tang dynasty
- Liu Zhan, chancellor and official of the Tang dynasty
- Liu Chongwang, chancellor of the Tang dynasty
- Liu Zhangqing, famous poet and politician
- Liu Yuxi, famous poet and statesman
- Liu Kezhuang, famous poet of southern song
- Liu Xu, chancellor of Later Tang and Later Jin
- Liu Bingzhong, chancellor of the Yuan dynasty
- Liu Bowen, famous poet, statesman, strategist and thinker
- Liu Tongxun, a politician of the Qing dynasty
- Liu Yong, politician and calligrapher of the Qing dynasty
- Liu Mingchuan, First Governor of Taiwan
- Liu Ji (politician), (1887–1967), 11th Republic-era mayor of Beijing
- Liu Shaoqi, President of China
- Liu Bocheng, a Chinese military commander in 20th century wars and one of the Marshals of the People's Liberation Army
