= Battle of Bi =

597 BCE battle between the Chinese states of Chu and Jin

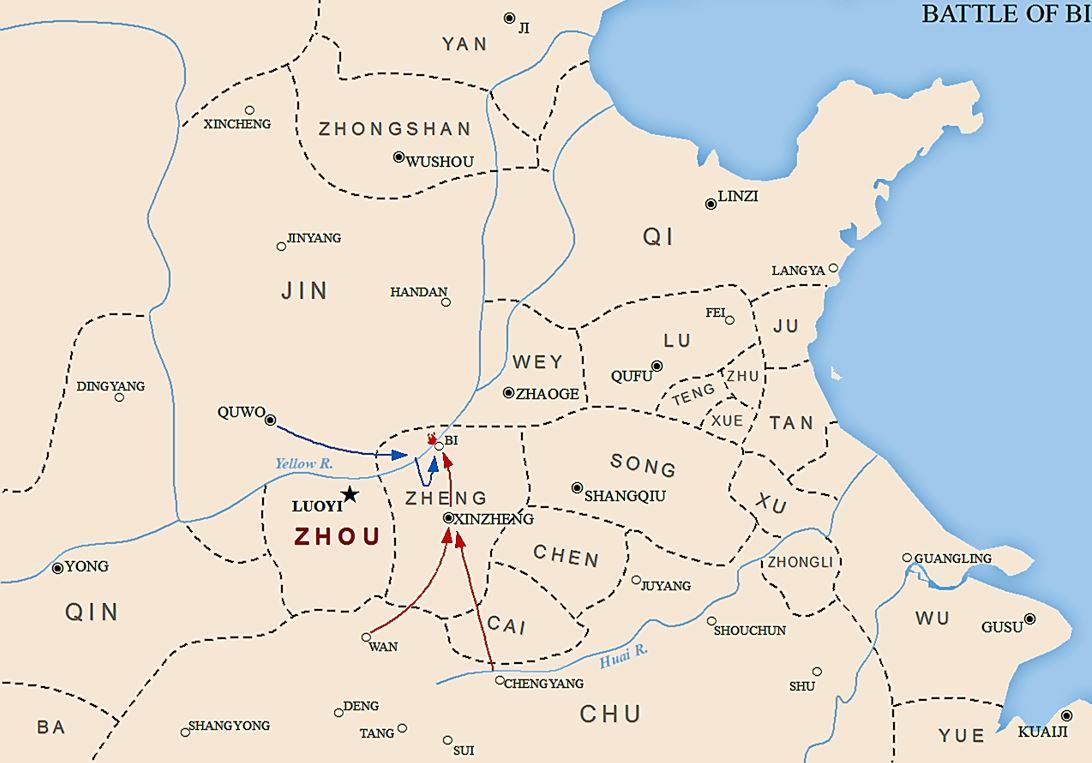
- Battle of Bi
Date	597 BC
Location	Bi, near modern day Xingyang, Henan Province
Result	Chu victory, hegemony of King Zhuang of Chu

Belligerents
Chu; Zheng	Jin

Commanders and leaders
King Zhuang of Chu; Sunshu Ao; Zi Zhong; Zi Fan	Xun Linfu; Shi Hui; Zhao Shuo

Strength
Unknown	Unknown

Casualties and losses
Unknown	Unknown

The Battle of Bi (Chinese: 邲之戰; pinyin: Bì zhī Zhàn) was fought during the Spring and Autumn period of Ancient China in 597 BC, between the major states of Chu and Jin. Occurring three and a half decades after the Battle of Chengpu, where Jin decisively defeated Chu, the battle was a major victory for Chu, cementing the position of its ruler King Zhuang as a hegemon among the vassal states of the Zhou dynasty.

== Background ==
The states of Jin and Chu were both among the most powerful of their time, but while Jin was considered a legitimate Zhou state in terms of culture and lineage, the state of Chu, whose territory encompassed many non-Chinese cultures in the middle Yangtze River, was considered a half-civilised state at best.

The Jin–Chu rivalry had last come to a head with the decisive defeat of Chu at the Battle of Chengpu, where Duke Wen of Jin became hegemon among the states; after the death of Duke Wen, Chu attempted to reassert its position with northern campaigns, but the presence of Zhao Dun as premier of Jin rendered them unwilling to risk direct conflict.

This situation would change dramatically with the death of Zhao Dun in 601 BC, as well as the death of Duke Cheng of Jin the following year, followed by that of Zhao's successor Xi Que (郤缺) in 598 BC. King Zhuang made use of the resulting instability among the Jin leadership, and personally led a campaign northward.

== Campaign ==
King Zhuang targeted the state of Zheng, which was an ally of Jin, and successfully forced Zheng to switch allegiance to Chu. Meanwhile, Xun Linfu, the new commander of the Jin armies, led his forces to relieve Zheng, only to learn of the surrender of Zheng en route, while camped along the northern bank of the Yellow River. This created a rift among the Jin commanders, about whether to meet the Chu forces in battle. At the same time, Chu's armies retreated by 30 li and decamped, awaiting the Jin offensive.

== Battle ==
Xun Linfu, after hearing of Zheng's switch of allegiance, was in favour of retreating; however, his adjutant Xian Hu, maintaining that it would be cowardly to avoid battle as the hegemonic state, led his own troops across the Yellow River without instructions. This forced the rest of the army to follow suit.

Meanwhile, on the Chu side, King Zhuang was intimidated by the presence of the Jin army; even his commander Sunshu Ao was initially in favour of retreat. Wu Can, a Chu commander, advised against this, citing the inexperience of Xun Linfu as the supreme commander, the rashness of Xian Hu as adjutant, and the conflict between the Jin commanders. King Zhuang thus resolved to face down the Jin army, even though negotiations for a truce continued between the two armies.

The battle began only when two generals from the Jin army, dissatisfied at Xun Linfu's hesitation, decided to provoke the Chu forces. King Zhuang personally pursued the generals; Xun Linfu sent a force to escort the two generals back to Jin lines, but the rolling dust from this relief force was mistaken as a general advance by the Jin army. Fearing that the king could be cut off by the army, Sunshu Ao immediately ordered a general advance from the Chu army; this unexpected attack overwhelmed Jin forces, which then collapsed and were routed.

King Zhuang, upon winning the battle, led his generals to water their horses from the Yellow River; a request to pursue and destroy the remnant forces was rebuffed on the grounds that, with the humiliation of Chengpu avenged, there was no need for more slaughter.
