= Wu Can (Spring and Autumn period) =

Chinese politician of Chu during the Spring and Autumn Period

Wu Can (伍參, fl. 7th century BC) was an official of the State of Chu during the Spring and Autumn period. He was the great-grandfather of Wu Zixu. He was most notable for his participation in the Battle of Bi, where he intervened in favour of battle when King Zhuang of Chu was hesitant about facing the powerful army of Jin.

== Battle of Bi ==
In the run-up to the battle, Chu had forced Zheng to submit as its ally, defecting from Jin; this success in turn provoked Jin into sending a powerful army. King Zhuang's original intention had been to water his horses at the Yellow River as a symbolic gesture and then return to Chu; this was supported by his premier, Sunshu Ao.

The King had already turned his chariot southwards, preparing to head home. Wu Can, however, took an opportunity to petition the king to join battle. Citing the inexperience of the Jin supreme commander, Xun Linfu, as well as the arrogance and rashness of the vice-commander Xian Hu and the many conflicts among the Jin command staff, he predicted correctly that the Jin army was in fact badly divided and could easily be defeated. At the same time, he pointed out that while the Chu army was being personally commanded by the King, the Jin army was being commanded by the subordinates of the Duke of Jin; it would thus be especially humiliating for a king to retreat before a duke's servants. Encouraged by this, King Zhuang ordered Sunshu Ao to turn the army around and face the Jin army head-on.
