= Xian Zhen =

7th-century BC Chinese general

Xian Zhen (died 627 BC) was a general and politician of the State of Jin during the Spring and Autumn period of Chinese history. He served under Duke Wen of Jin.

At the end of 633 BC, Duke Wen of Jin established three armies, with Xian Zhen and Luan Zhi commanding the lower army. King Cheng of Chu led his forces to besiege the State of Song. Duke Cheng of Song sought assistance from the Jin Dynasty by sending gifts. In early 632 BC, before Duke Wen could mobilize his army, Xi Hu passed away. Duke Wen then appointed Xian Zhen as the commander of the central army. Xian Zhen proposed a plan to rescue Song and counterattack Chu. His strategy involved attacking the states of Cao and Wey, and then ceding their lands to Qi and Qin. This plan successfully pressured Chu, as Qi and Qin were instructed to persuade Chu to cease its siege of Song. Chu, having to defend Wey and Cao under its alliances, refused. Consequently, Qi and Qin grew resentful towards Chu, which shifted its focus to Wey and Cao rather than continuing the siege of Song.

Amid the deteriorating situation, King Cheng of Chu retreated. Despite the king’s displeasure, Ziyu remained and proposed to Jin, "If Jin forgives Wey and Cao, Chu will also forgive Song." Jin agreed, leading to Wey and Cao severing their alliances with Chu and aligning with Jin. This angered Ziyu, who then attacked the Jin army. In the Battle of Chengpu, Xian Zhen led the Jin forces to a decisive victory over Ziyu’s Chu army.

After Hu Yan died, Xian Zhen was promoted to minister. In 628 BC, Duke Wen of Jin passed away and was succeeded by Duke Xiang of Jin. In 627 BC, Duke Mu of Qin invaded Jin. Xian Zhen defeated the Qin army at the Battle of Xiao and captured three Qin generals. Wen Ying, a concubine of Duke Wen of Jin and daughter of Duke Mu of Qin, persuaded Duke Xiang to release the captured generals. The request was granted, and the generals returned to Qin. Xian Zhen, angered by the perceived disregard for his soldiers' merits, confronted Duke Xiang in a fit of rage and spat in his face.

Later that year, Di from the north invaded the State of Jin. Xian Zhen once again led his troops into battle and defeated the Di forces. In a final act of atonement for his earlier disrespect towards Duke Xiang, Xian Zhen removed his armor and helmet, charged into the midst of the Di army, and died in battle.
