= Battle of Xiao =

627 BC battle

- Part of Spring and Autumn period
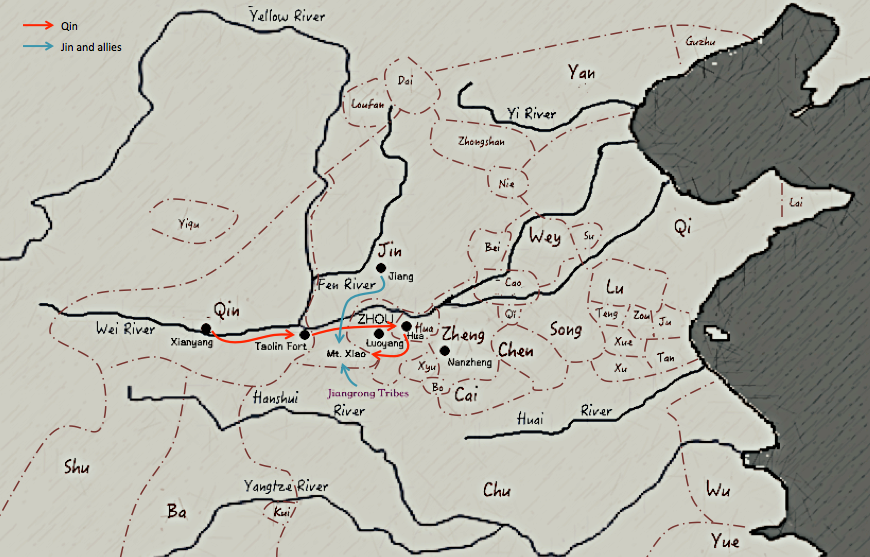
- Battle of Xiao between Qin and Jin
Date	April 627 BC
Location	Mountain Xiao (in western Henan)
Result	Jin victory

Belligerents
State of Qin	State of Jin

Commanders and leaders
Baili Mengming; Xi Qi Shu; Bai Yibing	Xian Zhen

Strength
About 500,000	About 100,000

Casualties and losses
30,000	Unknown

The Battle of Xiao or Yao (Chinese: 殽之戰) took place between Qin and Jin, both of which were major principality states during the Spring and Autumn period of the Zhou dynasty. It occurred in 627 BC at the Xiao Mountains, a branch of the Qinling Range between Yellow River and Luo River, in modern-day Henan province of China.

== Before the Battle ==
In 632 BC, the Battle of Chengpu broke out between Jin and Chu. The Chu was defeated, and the Duke Wen of Jin became one of Five Hegemons of Spring and Autumn period. State of Zheng was an ally of Chu, so after the battle, Jin planned to invade Zheng for revenge. In 630, Jin attacked Zheng and besieged its capital city. Qin also joined the force of Jin as Duke Mu of Qin was a follower to the Duke Wen of Jin.

Zhu Zhiwu, a person from Zheng, visited Duke Mu of Qin at night. He told the Duke Mu of Qin that if Zheng was conquered, there would be no benefit to Qin because they did not share a border at that time. On the other hand, Jin would occupy Zheng's territory. It would make Jin stronger and a greater threat to Qin. He pointed out that if Qin gave up attacking the city, Zheng would be willing to be an ally of Qin in the future to potentially fight against Jin. He successfully persuaded Duke Mu of Qin to retreat. Before going back, Duke Mu of Qin appointed three generals to stay at Zheng in order to help Zheng defend their capital city. The alliance between Jin and Qin then collapsed.

Jin failed to conquer Zheng because of the lack of support from Qin. Two years later, Duke Wen of Jin died. His son succeeds the crown as Duke Xiang of Jin. Meanwhile, state Qin gradually became stronger under Duke Mu's reign. Qin defeated several small states and extended its territory towards Zheng. As Zheng was not so far away anymore, Qin began to think about conquering Zheng. At this time, those three generals who had stayed with Zheng sent a message to Qin that if the army of Qin attacked Zheng, they would open the northern gate of Zheng's capital city to coordinate with the campaign.

Jian Shu, a governor of Qin, disliked the idea of attacking Zheng. He asked Duke Mu to abandon this plan because it might cause a potential crisis. However, Duke Mu had made his mind and continued the plan. In 627 BC, the duke appointed Baili Mengming (son of Baili Xi), Xi Wi Shu and Bai Yibing as generals to launch a surprise attack to Zheng. To enter the territory of Zheng, Qin army had to pass by the northern gate of Luoyang, the city in which the king of the Zhou lived. The king of Zhou was regarded as the son of heaven. According to traditional manners, soldiers needed to take off their helmets when passing by the city of Luoyang. The Qin soldiers, however, did not do so. People in the city were astonished, and some people pointed out that Qin soldiers could not win the war because they were too arrogant.

When the Qin army reached State of Hua, a hunter from Zheng noticed them. The hunter knew that there was not enough time for him to run back to Zheng to warn everybody, so he decided to fool the Qin army on his own. He paid tribute to the generals of Qin in the name of Zheng. After receiving the tribute, the generals of Qin thought that Zheng knew they were coming and was well prepared for the war, so they gave up the plan of attacking Zheng. Instead, they conquered Hua and retreated. In reality, Zheng did not know anything about the coming Qin army.

== Battle ==
The Duke Xiang of Jin learned what Qin was trying to do. He was annoyed because he knew that Qin was not only trying to conquer Zheng but also trying to challenge the authority of Jin. To give Qin a lesson, Duke Xiang of Jin allied with the Jiang Rong tribe (a Rong people living in the Han River valley) to launch a campaign against Qin. They planned to ambush Qin in the Xiao Mountains which was on the route of Qin's retreat. The army of Qin led by those three generals were still retreating from Hua, and they were not prepared to fight against the mighty Jin. These two forces collided at Xiao. The Jin army was superior and easily won the battle. Three generals of Qin were all captured by Jin.

After that, Wen Ying, who was a concubine of Duke Wen of Jin, also a daughter of Duke Mu of Qin, entreated Duke Xiang of Jin to release the three generals so that they would be punished in Qin, which was the desire of Duke Mu of Qin as she said. Her entreaty was accepted by Duke Xiang of Jin and the three generals were released and went back to Qin later.

When the three generals returned, Duke Mu of Qin put on white clothes to wait for them, crying that it was all his fault because he had not listened to Jian Shu's advice. Therefore, the three generals were not punished by Duke Mu of Qin.

As a result of this battle, Jin solidified its status as the most powerful state in northern China for the next several decades. Qin suffered a significant loss. About 30,000 men, most of whom were elite soldiers in the army, were killed in the battle. For a long period of time after the battle, Qin had no power to continue its eastward expansion. Instead, they turned around and began to expand towards the west. During this process, they clashed with several barbarians and nomadic groups and conquered several smaller states in the west and northwest. The westward expansion helped Qin to build up its power and laid the root for its being a strong state and the eventual unification of China.
