= Duke Xian of Qin =

Duke Xian of Qin may refer to:

- Duke Xian of Qin (725–704 BC) (秦憲公), often mistakenly called Duke Ning of Qin (秦寧公).
- Duke Xian of Qin (424–362 BC) (秦獻公), given name Shixi or Lian.
