= Duke De of Qin =

Duke De of Qin 秦德公

Ruler of Qin
- Reign: 677–676 BC
- Predecessor: Duke Wu of Qin
- Successor: Duke Xuan of Qin
- Born: 710 BC
- Died: 676 BC (aged 34)
- Issue: Duke Xuan of Qin; Duke Cheng of Qin; Duke Mu of Qin
Posthumous name
- Duke De (德公)
- House: Ying
- Dynasty: Qin
- Father: Duke Xian of Qin
- Mother: Lu Ji (魯姬)

Duke De of Qin (Chinese: 秦德公; pinyin: Qín Dé Gōng; 710–676 BC), personal name unknown, was a duke of the state of Qin during the Eastern Zhou dynasty who reigned from 677 to 676 BC.

Duke De was the second of the three sons of his father Duke Xian. His younger half-brother Chuzi I was the first to succeed Duke Xian in 704 BC, but was killed six years later. His older brother Duke Wu then ascended the throne and reigned for 20 years. Although Duke Wu had a son named Bai (白), when he died in 678 BC, it was Duke De who succeeded him, while Prince Bai was enfeoffed at the capital Pingyang.

In the first year of his reign, Duke De moved the capital to Yong (in present-day Fengxiang, Shaanxi), which would remain the capital of Qin until almost three centuries later, when Duke Xian (Shixi) moved the capital to Yueyang in 383 BC. However, Duke De reigned for only two years before dying in 676 BC at the age of 34. He had three sons, who would in turn ascend the throne as Duke Xuan, Duke Cheng, and Duke Mu, respectively.

Duke De of Qin House of Ying Born: 710 BC Died: 676 BC
Regnal titles
Preceded by Duke Wu of Qin	Duke of Qin; 677–676 BC	Succeeded by Duke Xuan of Qin
