= Chuzi I =

Ruler of Qin state from 703 to 698 BC

Chuzi of Qin 秦出子

Ruler of Qin
- Reign: 703–698 BC
- Predecessor: Duke Xian of Qin
- Successor: Duke Wu of Qin
- Born: 708 BC
- Died: 698 BC (aged 10)
Names
- Ying Man (嬴曼)
- House: Ying
- Dynasty: Qin
- Father: Duke Xian of Qin
- Mother: Wang Ji (王姬)

Chuzi (Chinese: 出子; pinyin: Chūzǐ; 708–698 BC), also sometimes called Duke Chu of Qin (Chinese: 秦出公), personal name Ying Man, was a ruler of the state of Qin, reigning from 703 to 698 BC during the Eastern Zhou dynasty. He was the first of two child rulers of Qin named Chuzi.

== Biography ==
Chuzi's father was Duke Xian of Qin, who died in 704 BC at the age of 21. Chuzi was the youngest of Duke Xian's three sons, and his mother was Wang Ji (王姬). His older half-brother, later known as Duke Wu of Qin, was the crown prince. Duke Wu and his younger brother, later known as Duke De of Qin, were both born to Duke Xian's main wife, Lu Ji (鲁姬). After Duke Xian died, however, the ministers Fuji (弗忌) and Sanfu (三父) deposed the crown prince and installed five-year-old Chuzi on the throne. Six years later, in 698 BC, Sanfu and Fuji assassinated Chuzi and put Duke Wu, the original crown prince, on the throne. Duke Wu later executed Sanfu and Fuji for the crime of murdering Chuzi.

Chuzi I House of Ying Born: 708 BC Died: 698 BC
Regnal titles
Preceded by Duke Xian of Qin	Duke of Qin; 703–698 BC	Succeeded by Duke Wu of Qin
