= Duke Cheng of Qin =

Duke Cheng of Qin 秦成公

Ruler of Qin
- Reign: 663–660 BC
- Predecessor: Duke Xuan of Qin
- Successor: Duke Mu of Qin
- Died: 660 BC
Posthumous name
- Duke Cheng (成公)
- House: Ying
- Dynasty: Qin
- Father: Duke De of Qin

Duke Cheng of Qin (Chinese: 秦成公; pinyin: Qín Chéng Gōng; died 660 BC), personal name unknown, was the duke of the state of Qin during the Eastern Zhou dynasty from 663 BC to 660 BC.

Duke Cheng was the second of the three sons of his father Duke De. His older brother Duke Xuan succeeded his father as ruler of Qin in 676 BC. However, when Duke Xuan died in 664 BC, he passed the throne to Duke Cheng instead of one of his nine sons. When Duke Cheng died four years later, he did the same and passed the throne to the third brother Duke Mu, even though he had seven sons.

Duke Cheng of Qin House of Ying Died: 660 BC
Regnal titles
Preceded by Duke Xuan of Qin	Duke of Qin; 663–660 BC	Succeeded by Duke Mu of Qin
