= Li Miao =

Li Miao may refer to:

- Li Miao (Three Kingdoms) (died 234), Shu Han official
- Li Miao (Tang dynasty) (died 773), Tang dynasty prince

== See also ==
- Limiao (disambiguation) for places
