= Duke Xuan of Qin =

Duke Xuan of Qin 秦宣公

Ruler of Qin
- Reign: 675–664 BC
- Predecessor: Duke De of Qin
- Successor: Duke Cheng of Qin
- Died: 664 BC
Posthumous name
- Duke Xuan (宣公)
- House: Ying
- Dynasty: Qin
- Father: Duke De of Qin

Duke Xuan of Qin (Chinese: 秦宣公; pinyin: Qín Xuān Gōng, died 664 BC), personal name unknown, was duke of the state of Qin during the Eastern Zhou dynasty from 675 to 664 BC.

Duke Xuan was the eldest of the three sons of his father Duke De and succeeded his father as ruler of Qin when Duke De died in 676 BC at the age of 34. He reigned for 12 years and died in 664 BC. Although Duke Xuan had nine sons, he passed the throne to his younger brother Duke Cheng, who would in turn pass the throne to their third brother, Duke Mu.

Duke Xuan of Qin House of Ying Died: 664 BC
Regnal titles
| Preceded by Duke De of Qin | Duke of Qin; 675–664 BC | Succeeded by Duke Cheng of Qin |
