= Wu of Qin =

Wu of Qin may refer to:

- Duke Wu of Qin (died 678 BC)
- King Wu of Qin (329–307 BC)
