= King Xi of Zhou =

King Xi of Zhou 周僖王

King of the Zhou dynasty
- Reign: 681–677 BC
- Predecessor: King Zhuang of Zhou
- Successor: King Hui of Zhou
- Died: 677 BC
- Issue: King Hui of Zhou; Duke Wen of Wangshu
Names
- Ancestral name: Jī (姬); Given name: Húqí (胡齊)
Posthumous name
- King Xi (僖王 or 釐王)
- House: Ji
- Dynasty: Zhou (Eastern Zhou)
- Father: King Zhuang of Zhou

King Xi of Zhou (died 677 BC) (Chinese: 周僖王; pinyin: Zhōu Xī Wáng), personal name Ji Huqi, was the 16th king of the Chinese Zhou dynasty.

He was the successor to his father King Zhuang, and was in turn succeeded by his son, King Hui.

By the time of King Xi's reign, China proper had dissolved into a multitude of Warring States, only nominally subject to the Eastern Zhou king, who was no longer even the most powerful figure (that was Duke Huan of the Qi state).

== Family ==
Sons:

- Prince Lang (王子閬; d. 652 BC), ruled as King Hui of Zhou from 676 to 652 BC
- Prince Hu (王子虎; d. 624 BC), ruled as Duke Wen of Wangshu (王叔文公) until 624 BC

== See also ==
- Family tree of ancient Chinese emperors

== Notes ==
King Xi of Zhou Zhou dynasty Died: 677 BC
Regnal titles
Preceded by King Zhuang of Zhou	King of China; 681–677 BC	Succeeded by King Hui of Zhou
