= King Xiang of Zhou =

King of Zhou Dynasty from 651 to 619 BC

King Xiang of Zhou 周襄王

King of the Zhou dynasty
- Reign: 651–619 BC
- Predecessor: King Hui of Zhou
- Successor: King Qing of Zhou
- Died: 619 BC
- Spouse: Queen Di
- Issue: King Qing of Zhou
Names
- Ancestral name: Jī (姬); Given name: Zhèng (鄭)
Posthumous name
- King Xiang (襄王)
- House: Ji
- Dynasty: Zhou (Eastern Zhou)
- Father: King Hui of Zhou
- Mother: Queen Hui of Zhou

Ji Zheng
- Traditional Chinese: 姬鄭
- Simplified Chinese: 姬郑
Transcriptions
Standard Mandarin
- Hanyu Pinyin: Jī Zhèng
- Wade–Giles: Chi Chêng

Posthumous name
- Chinese: 周襄王
Transcriptions
Standard Mandarin
- Hanyu Pinyin: Zhōu Xiāngwáng
- Wade–Giles: Chou Hsiang Wang

King Xiang of Zhou (died 619 BC), personal name Ji Zheng, was the 18th king of the Zhou dynasty of China. He succeeded his father King Hui to the throne.

He married Lady of the Dí, but later dismissed her.

In 635, King Xiang was driven from the capital by his brother Dai and was restored by Duke Wen of Jin.

After his death, he was succeeded by his son, King Qing.

== Family ==
Spouse:

- Zhai Hou, of the Kui clan of Di (翟后 隗姓), deposed

Sons:

- Prince Renchen (王子壬臣; d. 613 BC), ruled as King Qing of Zhou from 618 to 613 BC
- Youngest son, the father of Prince Man (王孫滿), who rebuffed King Zhuang of Chu regarding the weight of the Nine Tripod Cauldrons

== See also ==
Family tree of ancient Chinese emperors

King Xiang of Zhou Zhou dynasty Died: 619 BC
Regnal titles
Preceded by King Hui of Zhou	King of China; 651–619 BC	Succeeded by King Qing of Zhou
