= Limiao =

Limiao (李庙) may refer to:

- Limiao, Hubei, a town in Nanzhang County, Hubei, China
- Limiao Township, a township in Shangluo, Shaanxi, China

== See also ==
- Li Miao (disambiguation) for people
