= Lau (surname) =

- Romanization: Lau (derived from Cantonese pronunciation) Liu (derived from Mandarin pronunciation) Lew (derived from early immigrants) Lao (derived from some Chinese-fillipinos and Teochews)
- Pronunciation: /ˈlaʊ/

Origin
- Derivation: Surname of the Han Dynasty's ruling family
- Meaning: "one who came from the Lion" (German) a type of axe or halberd (archaic) (Chinese) (to) slaughter (archaic) (Chinese) withered, scattered (archaic) (Chinese)
- Region of origin: Chinese-speaking countries Korean-speaking countries Vietnamese-speaking countries German-speaking countries

Other names
- Variant form: Liu (surname)

Lau is a surname. Notable people with the surname include:

- Amy Lau (1968–2025), American interior designer
- Andrew Lau (born 1960), Hong Kong director and producer
- Andy Lau (born 1961), Hong Kong singer and actor
- Carina Lau (born 1965), Hong Kong-Canadian actress and director
- Chak Sing Lau, Hong Kong professor of rheumatology
- Charley Lau (1933–1984), American catcher and hitting coach in Major League Baseball
- Christel Lau (born 1944), German field hockey player
- Constance Lau (born 1991), Singaporean actress and model
- David Lau (born 1966), Ashkenazi Chief Rabbi of Israel
- Emma Lau (born 1991), British actress
- Evelyn Lau (born 1971), Canadian writer
- Finn Lau (born 1993), Hong Kong political activist
- Frederick Lau (born 1989), German actor
- Fritz Lau (1872–1966), Low German writer, playwright and lyricist
- Gordon Lau (1941–1998), American politician
- Hans E. Lau (1879–1918), Danish astronomer
- Hawick Lau (born 1974), Hong Kong actor
- Henry Lau (born 1989), Canadian singer in South Korean subgroup Super Junior-M
- Jasmin Lau (born 1982), Singaporean politician
- Jean Marie du Lau (1738–1792), Archbishop of Arles, killed during the French Revolution
- Jenny Lau (born 1985), British food writer and community organiser
- Jer Lau (born 1992), member of Hong Kong boy band MIRROR
- Laurence Lau (born 1954), American actor
- Lau Lee Peng (1952–2000), Singaporean killer
- Sean Lau (born 1964), Hong Kong actor
- Susanna Lau (born 1983), aka "Susie Bubble", British fashion blogger and journalist
- Wesley Lau (1921–1984), American film and television actor
- Yisrael Meir Lau (born 1937), former Orthodox Ashkenazi Chief Rabbi of Israel

== See also ==
- Liu (劉), a common Chinese family name transliterated Lau in Cantonese
- Lau clan, one of the Saraswat Brahmin clans of Punjab
