= Fan Ji =

Fan Ji (Chinese: 樊姬; died 7th century BC) was the queen consort of King Zhuang of Chu.

She acted as the political adviser of her spouse, and has been portrayed as a positive role model for women in Chinese history. She was noted for her clever methods of demonstrating her opinions and convincing people to change. In one famous story, she felt her husband was hunting too much, so she stopped eating meat, as a subtle reproach to him. He noted her actions, and ceased his inappropriate hunting.
