= Zheng Mao =

7th-century BC wife of King Cheng of Chu

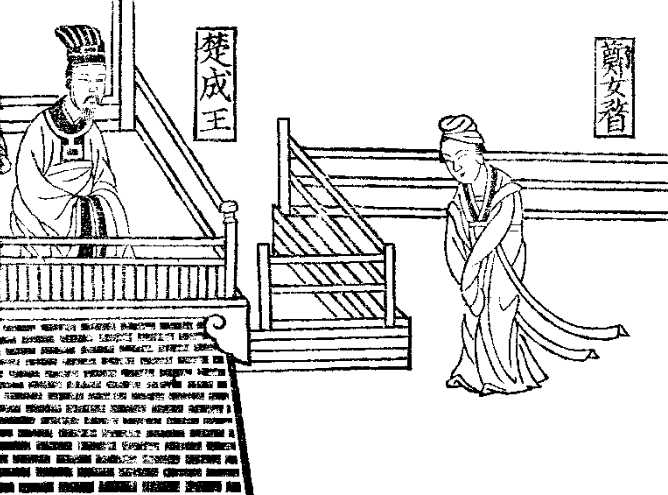
Qing Dynasty woodblock print showing Zheng Mao with King Cheng of Chu.

Zheng Mao (Chinese: 鄭瞀) was the primary wife of King Cheng of the State of Chu during the Spring and Autumn period of ancient China. She is one of 125 women whose biographies are included in the Biographies of Exemplary Women, written by Liu Xiang.

== Life ==
Zheng Mao was born to the Ying clan from the state of Zheng, which had fallen into decline after the death of Duke Zhuang. She was sent with the primary wife as a concubine for King Cheng of Chu (ruled. 671–626 BC).

After she arrived at the Chu palace, the king looked down on the women's quarters and noticed her not looking up no matter what he offered her. He then made her his principal wife. Both she and his chief minister cautioned against the appointment of his son Shangchen as crown prince. After the king ignored the advice, Shangchen caused the downfall of the minister. After this, the King wanted to appoint a younger son as heir apparent instead, but now Zheng Mao advised against this, predicting civil war.

Believing the king suspected her opposition against Shangchen was based on jealousy, she committed suicide. Not long after, Shangchen staged a coup d'etat and forced the King Cheng to commit suicide. Shangchen then ascended the throne as King Mu of Chu.

== Inclusion in the Lienü zhuan ==
The Han Dynasty scholar Liu Xiang included her biography in the Biographies of Exemplary Women. Zheng Mao's biography is part of Scroll 5, titled the Principled and Righteous (節義傳).

== Work Referenced ==
- Lee, Lily Xiao Hong; Stefanowska, A. D.; Wiles, Sue (2007). Biographical dictionary of Chinese women: antiquity through Sui, 1600 B.C.E.-618 C.E. M.E. Sharpe, Inc.
