= King Zhuang of Zhou =

King of the Zhou dynasty from 696 to 682 BC

King Zhuang of Zhou 周莊王

King of the Zhou dynasty
- Reign: 696–682 BC
- Predecessor: King Huan of Zhou
- Successor: King Xi of Zhou
- Died: 682 BC
- Spouse: Yao Ji
- Issue: King Xi of Zhou; Prince Tui
Names
- Ancestral name: Jī (姬); Given name: Tuó (佗)
Posthumous name
- King Zhuang (莊王)
- House: Ji
- Dynasty: Zhou (Eastern Zhou)
- Father: King Huan of Zhou

King Zhuang of Zhou (died 682 BC) (Chinese: 周莊王; pinyin: Zhōu Zhuāng Wáng), personal name Ji Tuo, was the 15th king of China's Zhou dynasty. He succeeded his father, King Huan, and was in turn succeeded by his son, King Xi. His younger son was Prince Tui.

== Family ==
Concubines:

- Yao Ji, of the Yao clan (姚姬 姚姓), the mother of Prince Tui

Sons:

- First son, Prince Huqi (王子胡齊; d. 677 BC), ruled as King Xi of Zhou from 681–677 BC
- Prince Tui (王子頹; 696–673 BC), claimed the throne of Zhou from 675–673 BC

== See also ==
Family tree of ancient Chinese emperors

== Notes ==
King Zhuang of Zhou Zhou dynasty Died: 682 BC
Regnal titles
Preceded by King Huan of Zhou	King of China; 696–682 BC	Succeeded by King Xi of Zhou
