= King Hui of Zhou =

King of the Zhou dynasty from 676 to 652 BC

King Hui of Zhou 周惠王

King of the Zhou dynasty
- Reign: 676–652 BC
- Predecessor: King Xi of Zhou
- Successor: King Xiang of Zhou
- Died: 652 BC
- Spouse: Queen Chen; Queen Hui of Zhou
- Issue: King Xiang of Zhou; Duke Zhao of Gan; Wang Ji
Names
- Ancestral name: Jī (姬); Given name: Làng (閬) or Wén (聞)
Posthumous name
- King Hui (惠王)
- House: Ji
- Dynasty: Zhou (Eastern Zhou)
- Father: King Xi of Zhou

King Hui of Zhou

Posthumous name
- Chinese: 周惠王
- Literal meaning: The Benevolent King of Zhou
Transcriptions
Standard Mandarin
- Hanyu Pinyin: Zhōu Huì Wáng
- Wade–Giles: Chou Huì-wang; King Huì of Chou

King Hui of Zhou (Chinese: 周惠王; pinyin: Zhōu Huì Wáng), personal name Ji Lang, was the 17th king of the Chinese Zhou dynasty.

== Family ==
Queens:

- Queen Chen (陳后)
- Queen Hui of Zhou, of the Gui clan of Chen (周惠后 媯姓), known as Chen Gui (陳媯); possibly a daughter of Duke Xuan of Chen; married in 676 BC; the mother of Crown Prince Zheng and Prince Dai

Sons:

- Crown Prince Zheng (太子鄭; d. 619 BC), ruled as King Xiang of Zhou from 651–619 BC
- Prince Dai (王子帶; 672–635 BC), ruled as Duke Zhao of Gan (甘昭公) until 635 BC

Daughters:

- Wang Ji (王姬)
  - Married Duke Xiang of Song (d. 637 BC)

== See also ==
Family tree of ancient Chinese emperors

King Hui of Zhou Zhou dynasty Died: 652 BC
Regnal titles
Preceded by King Xi of Zhou	King of China; 676–652 BC	Succeeded by King Xiang of Zhou
