= King Kuang of Zhou =

King Kuang of Zhou 周匡王

King of the Zhou dynasty
- Reign: 612–607 BC
- Predecessor: King Qing of Zhou
- Successor: King Ding of Zhou
- Died: 607 BC
Names
- Ancestral name: Jī (姬); Given name: Bān (班)
Posthumous name
- King Kuang (匡王)
- House: Ji
- Dynasty: Zhou (Eastern Zhou)
- Father: King Qing of Zhou

King Kuang of Zhou (Chinese: 周匡王; pinyin: Zhōu Kuāng Wáng), personal name Ji Ban, was the 20th king of China's Zhou dynasty.

King Kuang's father was King Qing, whom he succeeded. Kuang was succeeded by his brother, King Ding.

== See also ==
Family tree of ancient Chinese emperors

King Kuang of Zhou Zhou dynasty Died: 607 BC
Regnal titles
Preceded by King Qing of Zhou	King of China; 612–607 BC	Succeeded by King Ding of Zhou
