= King Jian of Zhou =

King Jian of Zhou 周簡王

King of the Zhou dynasty
- Reign: 585–572 BC
- Predecessor: King Ding of Zhou
- Successor: King Ling of Zhou
- Died: 572 BC
- Issue: King Ling of Zhou
Names
- Ancestral name: Jī (姬); Given name: Yí (夷)
Posthumous name
- King Jian (簡王)
- House: Ji
- Dynasty: Zhou (Eastern Zhou)
- Father: King Ding of Zhou

King Jian of Zhou (Chinese: 周簡王; pinyin: Zhōu Jiǎn Wáng), personal name Ji Yi, was the 22nd king of the Chinese Zhou dynasty.

== Family ==
Sons:

- Prince Xiexin (王子洩心; d. 545 BC), ruled as King Ling of Zhou from 571 to 545 BC
- A son (d. 545 BC) who was the progenitor of the Dan lineage and the father of Dan Kuo (儋括)
  - Known as Dan Ji (儋季)

== See also ==
- Family tree of ancient Chinese emperors

== Sources ==
King Jian of Zhou Zhou dynasty Died: 572 BC
Regnal titles
| Preceded by King Ding of Zhou | King of China; 585–572 BC | Succeeded by King Ling of Zhou |
