= King Ling of Zhou =

Zhou dynasty king

King Ling of Zhou 周靈王
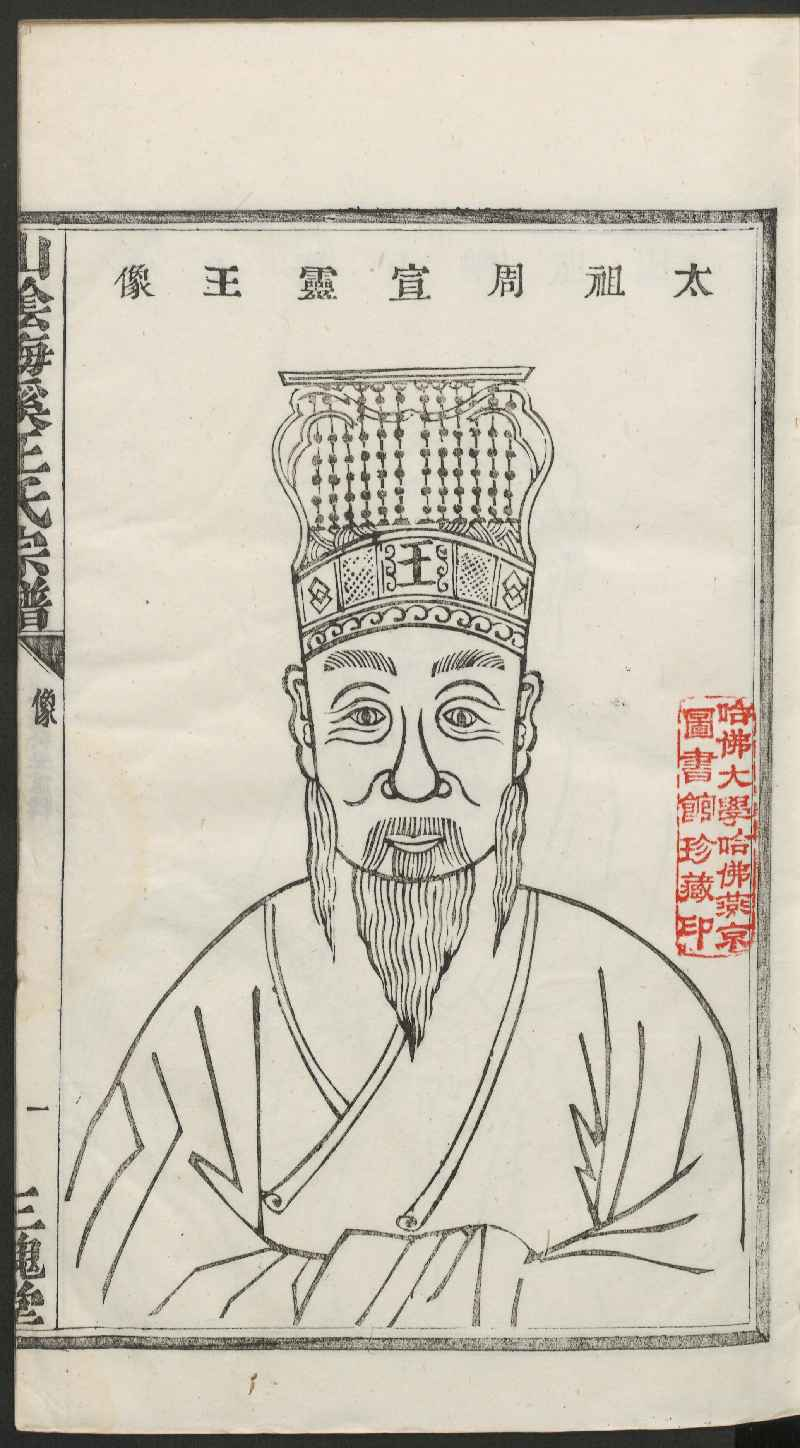

King of the Zhou dynasty
- Reign: 571–545 BC
- Predecessor: King Jian of Zhou
- Successor: King Jǐng of Zhou
- Died: 545 BC
- Spouse: Qi Jiang
- Issue: Crown Prince Jin; King Jǐng of Zhou
Names
- Ancestral name: Jī (姬); Given name: Xìexīn (泄心)
Posthumous name
- King Ling (靈王)
- House: Ji
- Dynasty: Zhou (Eastern Zhou)
- Father: King Jian of Zhou

King Ling of Zhou

Posthumous name
- Chinese: 周靈王
- Literal meaning: The Spirited King of Zhou
Transcriptions
Standard Mandarin
- Hanyu Pinyin: Zhōu Líng Wáng
- Wade–Giles: Chou Líng-wang; King Líng of Chou

King Ling of Zhou (Chinese: 周靈王; pinyin: Zhōu Líng Wáng; died 545 BC), personal name Ji Xiexin(Chinese: 姬泄心; pinyin: Jī Xìexīn), was the 23rd king of the Zhou dynasty of China.

In the twenty-first year of his reign, Confucius was born.

His was succeeded by his son, King Jǐng.

His other son was the crown prince Ji Jin (姬晉). Empress Wu Zetian claimed that her lover Zhang Changzong was a reincarnation of Ji Jin.

== Family ==
Queens:

- Qi Jiang, of the Jiang clan of Qi (齊姜 姜姓), possibly a daughter of Duke Ling of Qi; married in 558 BC

Sons:

- First son, Crown Prince Jin (太子晉), was reduced to civilian status due to his remonstration to his father king.
- Prince Gui (王子貴; d. 520 BC), ruled as King Jĭng of Zhou from 544–520 BC
- Prince Ningfu (王子佞夫; d. 543 BC)

Grandsons:

- Wang Zongjing (王宗敬), son of Crown Prince Jin. He served as the Minister of Education of Zhou. Because of the people at the time called his family the "Wang (王) family" (Wang is the Chinese word for "king"), he used "Wang" as his surname. Qin general Wang Jian was a 15th-generation direct male descendant of he.

== Ancestor of the Taiyuan Wang ==
During the Tang dynasty the Li family of Zhaojun 赵郡李氏, the Cui family of Boling 博陵崔氏, the Cui family of Qinghe 清河崔氏, the Lu family of Fanyang 范陽盧氏, the Zheng family of Xingyang 荥阳郑氏, the Wang family of Taiyuan 太原王氏, and the Li family of Longxi 隴西李氏 were the seven noble families among whom marriage was banned by law. Moriya Mitsuo wrote a history of the Later Han-Tang period of the Taiyuan Wang. Among the strongest families was the Taiyuan Wang. The prohibition on marriage between the clans issued in 659 by the Gaozong Emperor was flouted by the seven families since a woman of the Boling Cui married a member of the Taiyuan Wang, giving birth to the poet Wang Wei. He was the son of Wang Chulian who in turn was the son of Wang Zhou. The marriages between the families were performed clandestinely after the prohibition was implemented on the seven families by Gaozong. The Zhou dynasty King Ling's son Prince Jin is assumed by most to be the ancestor of the Taiyuan Wang. The Longmen Wang were a cadet line of the Zhou dynasty descended Taiyuan Wang, and Wang Yan and his grandson Wang Tong hailed from this cadet line. Both Buddhist monks and scholars hailed from the Wang family of Taiyuan such as the monk Tanqian. The Wang family of Taiyuan included Wang Huan. Their status as "Seven Great surnames" became known during Gaozong's rule. The Taiyuan Wang family produced Wang Jun who served under Emperor Huai of Jin. A Fuzhou based section of the Taiyuan Wang produced the Buddhist monk Baizhang.

== See also ==
- Family tree of ancient Chinese emperors

== Notes ==
King Ling of Zhou Zhou dynasty Died: 545 BC
Regnal titles
Preceded by King Jian of Zhou	King of China; 571–545 BC	Succeeded by King Jĭng of Zhou
