= Di Hou =

Zhai Hou (7th-century BC), was the queen consort of King Xiang of Zhou, who reigned from 651 to 619 BC.

She was deposed after an affair with her brother-in-law.
