= Duke Wu of Qin =

Duke Wu of Qin 秦武公

Ruler of Qin
- Reign: 697–678 BC
- Predecessor: Chuzi I
- Successor: Duke De of Qin
- Died: 678 BC
Posthumous name
- Duke Wu (武公)
- House: Ying
- Dynasty: Qin
- Father: Duke Xian of Qin
- Mother: Lu Ji (魯姬)

Duke Wu of Qin (Chinese: 秦武公; pinyin: Qín Wǔ Gōng, died 678 BC), whose personal name is unknown, was a duke of the state of Qin during the Eastern Zhou dynasty. He reigned from 697 to 678 BC.

== Accession to the throne ==
Duke Wu was the eldest son and the crown prince of Duke Xian of Qin. However, when Duke Xian died in 704 BC at the age of 21, the ministers Fuji (弗忌) and Sanfu (三父) deposed Duke Wu and installed his younger half-brother Chuzi on the throne. Six years later, in 698 BC, Sanfu and Fuji assassinated Chuzi and put Duke Wu, the original crown prince, on the throne.

== Reign ==
In 697 BC, the first year of Duke Wu's reign, Qin attacked the Pengxi tribe (彭戏氏) of the Rong people, and the Qin army advanced east to Mount Hua. In 695 BC, Duke Wu executed Sanfu, Fuji, and their clans for the crime of murdering Chuzi. In 688 BC, he attacked the Rong people to the west, establishing counties in the former Rong territories of Gui (邽, in present-day Tianshui, Gansu) and Ji (冀, in present-day Gangu, Gansu). The following year, he established the counties of Du (杜, in present-day Xi'an, Shaanxi) and Zheng (郑, in present-day Hua County, Shaanxi) in the east and conquered the minor state of Xiao Guo.

== Death and succession ==
After 20 years of reign, Duke Wu died in 678 BC and was buried in Yong (in present-day Fengxiang, Shaanxi). Although Duke Wu had a son named Bai (白), he was succeeded by his younger brother Duke De of Qin as ruler of Qin. Duke De moved the Qin capital to Yong, while Prince Bai was enfeoffed at the old capital, Pingyang.

== Human sacrifice ==
According to Sima Qian, Duke Wu was the ruler who started the practice of funereal human sacrifice in the state of Qin. When he died in 678 BC, he had 66 people buried with him. The later ruler Duke Mu, who died in 621 BC, continued the tradition and had 177 people buried with him, including several senior government officials. This practice would continue for almost three centuries until Duke Xian (Shixi) banned it in 384 BC.

Duke Wu of Qin House of Ying Died: 678 BC
Regnal titles
Preceded by Chuzi I	Duke of Qin; 697–678 BC	Succeeded by Duke De of Qin
