= King Mu of Chu =

King Mu of Chu 楚穆王

King of Chu
- Reign: 625–614 BC
- Predecessor: King Cheng
- Successor: King Zhuang
- Died: 614 BC
- Issue: King Zhuang; Xiong Yingqi (熊嬰齊); Xiong Ce (熊側); Xiong Renfu (熊壬夫); Xiong Zhu (熊竺)
Names
- Ancestral name: Mǐ (羋); Lineage name: Xióng (熊); Given name: Shāngchén (商臣)
Posthumous name
- King Mu (穆王)
- House: Mi
- Dynasty: Chu
- Father: King Cheng

King Mu of Chu (Chinese: 楚穆王; pinyin: Chǔ Mù Wáng), personal name Xiong Shangchen, was from 625 BC to 614 BC the king of the Chu state.

King Mu was a son of King Cheng and was the original crown prince. In 626 BC, King Cheng tried to make his other son, Xiong Zhi (熊職), the new crown prince on the advice of his wife, Zheng Mao. When King Mu learned of his father's plan, he surrounded the palace with his soldiers and forced King Cheng to hang himself. King Mu then ascended the throne.

He was succeeded by his son, King Zhuang.

King Mu of Chu House of Mii Died: 614 BC
Regnal titles
Preceded by King Cheng of Chu	King of Chu; 625–614 BC	Succeeded by King Zhuang of Chu
