= Du'ao =

Du'ao 堵敖

King of Chu
- Reign: 676–672 BC
- Predecessor: King Wen
- Successor: King Cheng
- Died: 672 BC
Names
- Ancestral name: Mǐ (羋); Lineage name: Xióng (熊); Given name: Jiān (艱 or 囏)
- House: Mi
- Dynasty: Chu
- Father: King Wen

Du'ao (Chinese: 堵敖 or 杜敖), also known as Zhuang'ao (Chinese: 莊敖), personal name Xiong Jian, was a king of the Chu state, reigning from 676 BC to 672 BC.

Du'ao succeeded his father, King Wen, to the Chu throne. In 672 BC, he attempted to kill his younger brother, Xiong Yun (King Cheng), who escaped to the Sui state. Xiong Yun attacked and killed Du'ao with the help of Sui and ascended the throne of Chu thereafter.

Du'ao House of Mi Died: 672 BC
Regnal titles
Preceded by King Wen of Chu	King of Chu; 676–672 BC	Succeeded by King Cheng of Chu
