= King Qing of Zhou =

King Qing of Zhou 周頃王

King of the Zhou dynasty
- Reign: 618–613 BC
- Predecessor: King Xiang of Zhou
- Successor: King Kuang of Zhou
- Died: 613 BC
- Issue: King Kuang of Zhou; King Ding of Zhou; Duke Kang of Liu (劉康公)
Names
- Ancestral name: Jī (姬); Given name: Rénchén (壬臣)
Posthumous name
- King Qing (頃王)
- House: Ji
- Dynasty: Zhou (Eastern Zhou)
- Father: King Xiang of Zhou

King Qing of Zhou (Chinese: 周頃王; pinyin: Zhōu Qǐng Wáng), personal name Ji Renchen, was the 19th king of China's Zhou dynasty.

The son of King Xiang, King Qing ascended to the throne in 618 BC after his father died.

King Qing had three sons, Princes Ban (King Kuang), Yu and Jizi. After King Qing died in 613 BC, he was succeeded by Ban.

== Family ==
Sons:

- Prince Ban (王子班; d. 607 BC), ruled as King Kuang of Zhou from 612 to 607 BC
- Prince Yu (王子瑜; d. 586 BC), ruled as King Ding of Zhou from 606 to 586 BC
- Prince Jizi (王子季子; d. 544 BC), ruled the State of Liu (劉國), known posthumously as Duke Kang of Liu (劉康公) from 592 to 544 BC

== See also ==
Family tree of ancient Chinese emperors

King Qing of Zhou Zhou dynasty Died: 613 BC
Regnal titles
Preceded by King Xiang of Zhou	King of China; 618–613 BC	Succeeded by King Kuang of Zhou
