= King Ding of Zhou =

King Ding of Zhou 周定王

King of the Zhou dynasty
- Reign: 606–586 BC
- Predecessor: King Kuang of Zhou
- Successor: King Jian of Zhou
- Died: 586 BC
- Spouse: Queen Ding of Zhou
- Issue: King Jian of Zhou
Names
- Ancestral name: Jī (姬); Given name: Yú (瑜)
Posthumous name
- King Ding (定王)
- House: Ji
- Dynasty: Zhou (Eastern Zhou)
- Father: King Qing of Zhou

King Ding of Zhou (Chinese: 周定王; pinyin: Zhōu Dìng Wáng), personal name Ji Yu, was the 21st king of the Chinese Zhou dynasty. He was a son of King Qing and brother of his predecessor, King Kuang.

He sent an official named Wangsun Man (王孫滿) to present gifts to the Chu army. He met King Zhuang of Chu.

== Family ==
Spouse:

- Queen Ding of Zhou, of the Jiang clan of Qi (周定后 姜姓), possibly a daughter of Duke Hui of Qi; married in 603 BC

Sons:

- Prince Yi (王子夷; d. 572 BC), ruled as King Jian of Zhou from 585 to 572 BC

== See also ==
1. Family tree of ancient Chinese emperors

== Sources ==
King Ding of Zhou Zhou dynasty Died: 586 BC
Regnal titles
Preceded by King Kuang of Zhou	King of China; 606–586 BC	Succeeded by King Jian of Zhou
