= Cheng Dechen =

Prime Minister of State of Chu (d. 632 BCE)

Cheng Dechen (Chinese: 成得臣; pinyin: Chéng Déchén; died 632 BCE), also known by his courtesy name Ziyu (子玉), was a prime minister of the State of Chu during the Spring and Autumn period of Chinese history. He served under King Cheng of Chu (reigned 671–626 BCE) and committed suicide after the Battle of Chengpu in 632 BCE.

In the summer of 632 BCE, King Cheng attacked the State of Song, when Song called for help from the State of Jin, King Cheng intended to retreat. Cheng Dechen asked to continue fighting but King Cheng said: “Chong’er (Duke Wen of Jin) has fled his home for many years. To suddenly attack his country is not right under heaven.” Cheng Dechen pressed his case and advanced on Jin with a small division only to be defeated. On hearing the news, the furious King blamed Cheng Dechen, who committed suicide. In Chu, King Chen was not blamed for the defeat with an official in Chu saying that Cheng Dechen was "obdurate and lacking in ritual propriety" and was an incapable military leader.
