= Duke Xian of Qin (725–704 BC) =

Duke Xian of Qin 秦憲公

Ruler of Qin
- Reign: 715–704 BC
- Predecessor: Duke Wen of Qin
- Successor: Chuzi I
- Born: 725 BC
- Died: 704 BC (aged 21)
- Spouse: Lu Ji (魯姬); Wang Ji (王姬)
- Issue: Duke Wu of Qin (by Lu Ji); Duke De of Qin (by Lu Ji); Chuzi I (by Wang Ji)
Posthumous name
- Duke Xian (憲公)
- House: Ying
- Dynasty: Qin
- Father: Duke Jing of Qin (秦竫公; son of Duke Wen)

Duke Xian of Qin (Chinese: 秦憲公; pinyin: Qín Xiàn Gōng, 725–704 BC), personal name unknown, was a duke of the state of Qin during the Eastern Zhou dynasty. His posthumous name was recorded as Duke Ning of Qin (秦寧公) in the Records of the Grand Historian by Western Han historian Sima Qian, but inscriptions on excavated bronzes from the era have proven that "Ning" (寧) was a miscopy of the correct character, "Xian" (憲).

== Accession to the throne ==
Duke Xian succeeded his grandfather Duke Wen of Qin, who ruled for 50 years and died in 716 BC. Duke Xian was made the crown prince after his father predeceased Duke Wen in 718 BC. His father was given the posthumous title Duke Jing of Qin (秦竫公) although he never ascended the throne.

== Reign ==
In 714 BC, the second year of Duke Xian's reign, the Qin capital was moved to Pingyang (平陽, in present-day Baoji, Shaanxi). The next year Qin defeated the Rong state of Bo (亳), whose king escaped to the Rong homeland.

In autumn 708 BC Qin attacked the minor state of Rui, but was defeated. Qin returned in winter with the army of King Huan of Zhou, defeated Rui, and captured Wan, Count of Rui.

== Succession ==
In 704 BC Qin annexed Bo. Duke Xian died in the same year at the age of 21. He had three young sons: the eldest, later known as Duke Wu of Qin, was the crown prince. The second son, later known as Duke De of Qin, was born to the same mother, Lu Ji (鲁姬). However, the ministers Fuji and Sanfu deposed the crown prince and installed his youngest son Chuzi, born to Duke Xian's other wife Wang Ji (王姬), on the throne. The boy was only five years old.

Duke Xian of Qin (725–704 BC) House of Ying Born: 725 BC Died: 704 BC
Regnal titles
Preceded by Duke Wen of Qin	Duke of Qin; 715–704 BC	Succeeded by Chuzi I
