= Sunshu Ao =

Chinese hydraulic engineer and politician

- Traditional Chinese: 孫叔敖
- Simplified Chinese: 孙叔敖
Transcriptions
Standard Mandarin
- Hanyu Pinyin: Sūnshū Áo, Sūnshú Áo

Sunshu Ao (孫叔敖, c. 630 – c. 593 BCE) was a Chinese hydraulic engineer and politician. He was a court minister serving the administration of King Zhuang of Chu during the Eastern Zhou dynasty. During his governmental career, Sunshu Ao was given notice by King Zhuang, who had him promoted to the rank of Prime Minister in the State of Chu. Sunshu Ao was entrusted with many endeavors of the state, and because of a large dam, reservoir, and irrigation project he had established, he is also credited as the first known hydraulic engineer of China.

== Dams, reservoirs, and irrigation ==
Both the ancient historian Sima Qian (in his Shiji) and the author of the Huai Nan Zi wrote of Sunshu Ao and his works. Their records state that Duke Zhuang had given Sunshu Ao the responsibility and oversight of the construction of a large river dam that would create an enormous planned reservoir for means of agricultural irrigation. The erection of this dam flooded a flat valley in modern-day northern Anhui province (south of Shouxian City), the reservoir created spanning a circumference of 62 miles (100 km). Since Shunshu's time, this ancient reservoir accumulated tons of north-flowing water that came from the mountains north of the Yangtze River, and supplied an irrigated area of some six million acres (24000 km^{2}). In ancient times, the Chinese had called this reservoir the Si-Si Bei, as well as the Shao Bei (Peony Dam). Today, the large reservoir created thousands of years ago by Sunshu Ao still exists, known in modern times as the Anfeng Tang (Anfeng Reservoir).

Subsequent Chinese authorities following the Zhou dynasty, such as the Chinese states of the Han dynasty (202 BCE – 220 CE) era and the Tang dynasty (618–960 CE) era, repaired and maintained the dam that flooded the reservoir created by Sunshu Ao.

== See also ==
- Ximen Bao
