= Baili Xi =

7th-century BC Qin politician

- Chinese: 百里奚
Transcriptions
Standard Mandarin
- Hanyu Pinyin: Bǎilǐ Xī
- Wade–Giles: Pai^{3}-li^{3} Hsi^{1}
Yue: Cantonese
- Yale Romanization: Baak^{3}lei^{5} Hai^{4}

Baili Xi (Chinese: 百里奚; pinyin: Bǎilǐ Xī; fl. 7th century BC), courtesy name Ziming (子明), was an influential prime minister of the state of Qin during the Spring and Autumn period of China.

== Background ==
Baili Xi was born during the Spring and Autumn period, a time of great internal chaos in China. Though talented, he came from a very poor family and was unable to realize his potential by the time he was in his 30s. After much encouragement from his wife, he left home to seek greener pastures and hopefully advance his career ambitions.

He went to the prosperous state of Qi to seek his fortune. However, the government was riddled with corruption and he had no money to bribe the officials. Before long, he had used up all his money and was forced to beg in the street. While in Qi, he befriended Jian Shu (蹇叔), another fellow scholar. Jian Shu talked to him and found him extremely talented.

Some years later, Baili Xi went to work in the minor state of Yu (虞国). He ended up in the state of Jin. Not wanting the serve the Jin regime, he went south to the state of Chu, another large state. The King of Chu did not know about his talents and sent him to care for the animals instead.

== Serving Duke Mu of Qin ==
Some years later, Duke Mu of Qin heard about Baili Xi and inquired of his whereabouts. Upon the advice of his minister, he famously redeemed Baili Xi with five pieces of goatskin. In order to escape detection from the king of Chu, he sent a low-ranking official to meet the king and had Baili Xi transported to Qin in a prisoner's cart. Once in Qin, Duke Mu accorded Baili Xi with great respect and appointed him as his right-hand man. Baili Xi was already in his 70s by that time. He recommended his old friend Jian Shu to Duke Mu. Together, the duo played a major role in Qin's rise to power. Thus, Duke Mu was able to attain "hegemon" status and became one of the "Five Hegemons of the Spring and Autumn period".
