= Battle of Chengpu =

Battle between Chinese states of Jin and Chu (632 BCE)

Coordinates: 34.6711°N 114.5290°E

- Part of the Spring and Autumn period
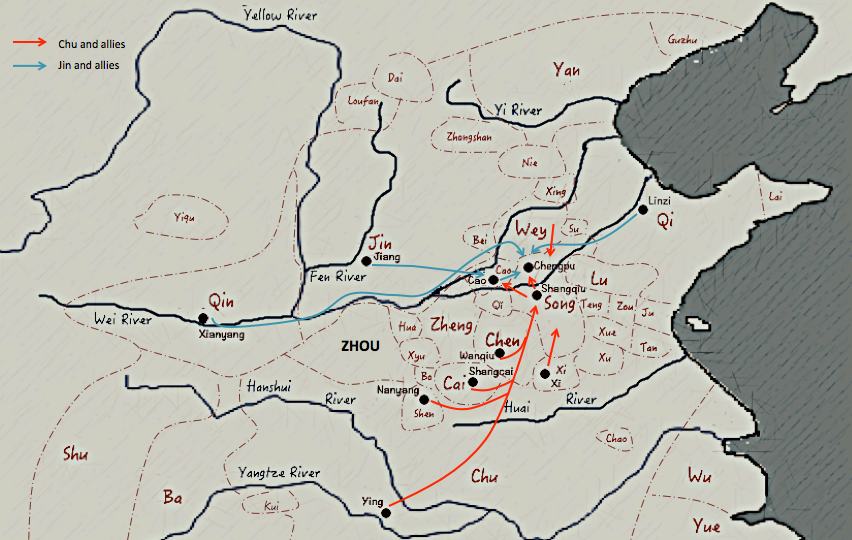
- Battle of Chengpu
Date	632 BC
Location	vicinity of Chenliu, Henan or the southwest of Juancheng County, Shandong
Result	Jin victory

Belligerents
Jin; Qi; Qin; Song	Chu; Chen; Cai; Shen; Xi; Wey

Commanders and leaders
Hu Mao; Hu Yan; Xian Zhen; Xi Zhen; Xu Chen; Luan Zhi	Ziyu; Zishang; Zixi

Strength
700 chariots (Jin), other parts unknown.	Unknown

Casualties and losses
Unknown	Unknown; 100 chariots and 1000 warriors captured

Battle of Chengpu
- Traditional Chinese: 城濮之戰
- Simplified Chinese: 城濮之战
Transcriptions
Standard Mandarin
- Hanyu Pinyin: Chéngpú zhī zhàn
- Wade–Giles: Ch‘êng-p‘u chih Chan

The Battle of Chengpu took place in 632 BC between the State of Jin and the State of Chu and its allies during the Spring and Autumn period of Chinese history. It was the first major battle in the protracted conflict between the states of the Yellow River valley, and the states of the Yangtze River valley. The Jin victory confirmed the hegemony of Duke Wen and checked Chu ambitions in the north for a period.

== Background ==
Following the death of Duke Huan of Qi in 643 BC, the state of Chu steadily extended its influence northward, absorbing half a dozen smaller states as its satellites. In 636 BC, Chong'er, a ducal prince of Jin, after nineteen years in exile traveling throughout numerous states, came to power as Duke Wen of Jin with the help of Duke Mu of Qin. Duke Wen assumed a position of leadership among the states and instituted numerous domestic reforms.

In the years leading up to 632 BC, conflict between Jin and Chu became increasingly public and was characterized by frequent shifts in alliances between the various small states that lay in a narrow band of land between the two larger states.

King Cheng of Chu attacked the State of Song, the ally of Jin most accessible from the south, in the winter of 633 BCE. In retaliation, an expeditionary force under Duke Wen marched south in the spring of the following year and occupied the States of Wey and Cao, both satellites of Chu. The two sides sought out alliances in the following months. The States of Shen, Xi, Chen and Cai, all immediately contiguous to Chu, sided with King Cheng, as well as the more distant State of Lu.

== Prelude ==
As promised by Duke Wen to King Cheng during his exile in Chu, the Jin army retired "three days march" (退避三舍) (45 km) before camping on the plain of Chengpu on the border of Wey and Cao, awaiting a decisive battle. The retirement also linked the Jin forces up with Qi and Qin reinforcements.

Only the central force of the Chu under Prime Minister Ziyu (子玉) was made up entirely of Chu troops. The left wing under Zixi incorporated soldiers from Chu's close satellites Shen and Xi. The right wing under Zishang comprised completely a separate detachment from the armies of Chen and Cai, perhaps numbering around a third of the entire force.

The Jin force was expanded before the expedition from two armies into three: the upper, the central and the lower; these three were then regrouped into wings before the battle: the upper army at the right wing under commander Hu Mao and vice-commander Hu Yan, lower at left under Luan Zhi and vice Xu Chen, central remained at center under Xian Zhen and vice Xi Chen . Duke Wen did not direct or engage in the fighting.

== Battle ==
On the fourth day of the fourth month of 632 BC, the rival forces met.

The battle commenced with the advance of both wings of the Jin army. The Chu right wing was reckoned to be the weakest and Xu Chen, commander of the Jin left wing, attacked. Xu Chen dressed his chariot horses with tiger skins to panic the Chu horses and launched an urgent, vigorous assault on the Chu right wing. The attack was rapidly successful, scattering and demolishing the enemy wing completely.

The Jin left then became a holding force, fixing the Chu center and preventing it from attacking the Jin centre or aiding the Chu left wing, since in either case the Jin left would have taken it in the flank and rear. Meanwhile, Hu Mao's Jin right wing had skirmished with the enemy, faked a retreat and carried with them the two great banners of the Jin commander-in-chief himself. The Chu left, made up of levies from the states of Shen and Xi, thought that the Jin right wing had lost and Ziyue ordered a pursuit. A contingent of chariots under Luan Zhi swept in front and dragged tree branches to raise a dust cloud and thereby obscure the movements of Hu Mao's men who were circling and reforming.

The Jin left aided by the Jin center continued to maintain their positions against the Chu center. Though the Jin centre was temporarily disordered by an intense whirlwind, it was effective in preventing the Chu center from supporting its left wing. As the Chu left advanced, it was caught in the flank by Duke Wen's bodyguards, composed of the sons of noble clansmen and sons of his close followers, as well as the Song contingent. Meanwhile, the entire force of the Jin right wing completed its re-circling and was supported on its right by Luan Zhi's chariots to join the assault. The Chu left was completely destroyed. Seeing both his wings enveloped, Ziyu ordered a general retreat, which turned into rout when it was discovered that the Chu camp and train in the rear had been captured during the battle by the Qi and Qin contingents, which had been sent to occupy it via a flanking march.

== Evaluation ==
The Battle of Chengpu was one of the biggest battles of the Spring and Autumn period and the most detailed in the Zuo Zhuan. Nevertheless, the location of the battle remains obscure: two inconclusive possibilities are the vicinity of Chenliu, Henan and the southwest area of Juancheng County, Shandong. After returning to the north, Duke Wen was recognized by the King of Zhou as first among the feudal lords. A multi-state conference at Jiantu in 631 BC headed by Duke Wen confirmed their support for the Zhou royal family and swore a covenant of alliance. The battle, however, was not effective in the long term in restricting the power of Chu.
