= Duke Mu of Qin =

Duke of Qin from 659 to 621 BC

Duke Mu of Qin 秦穆公
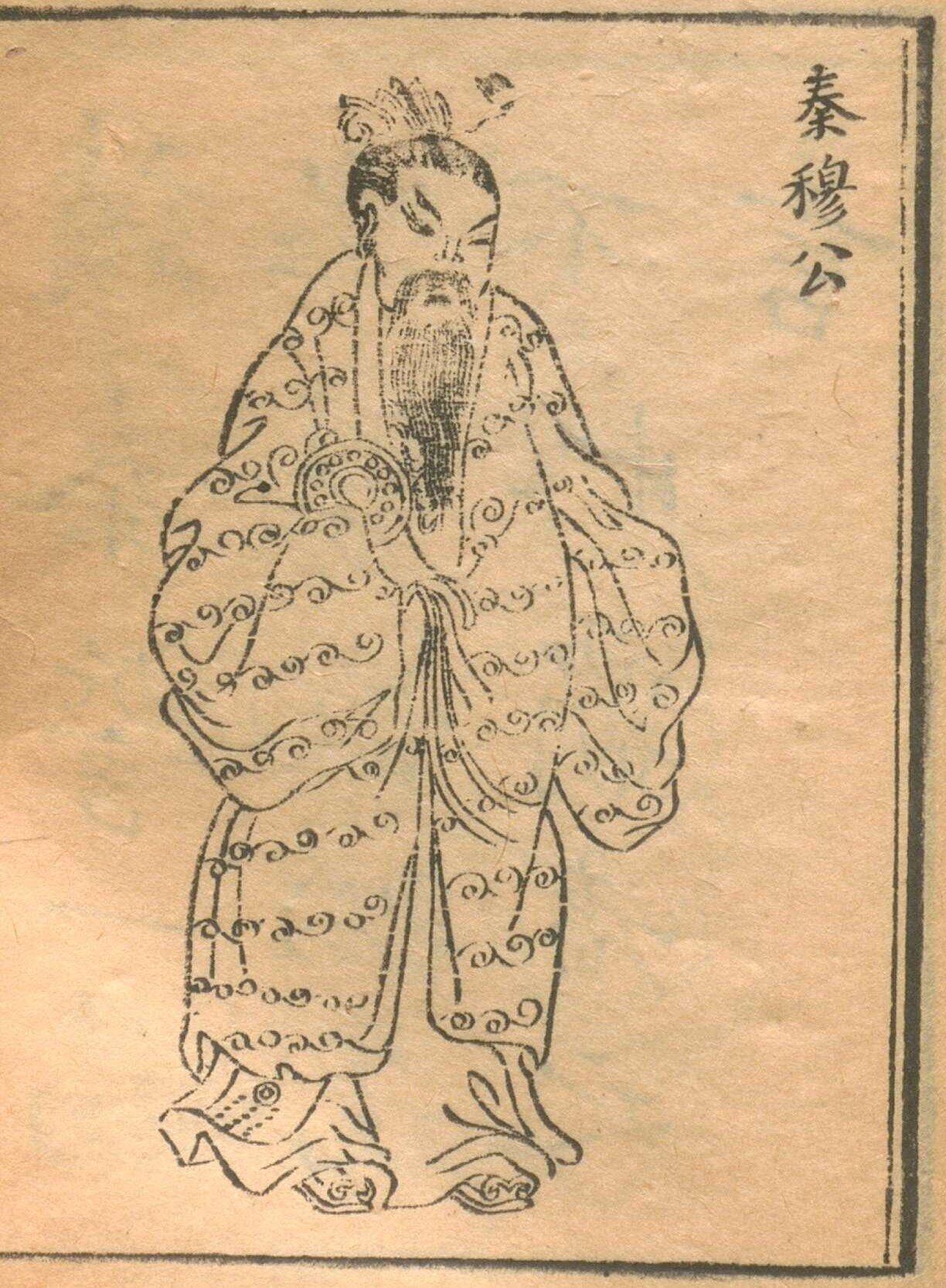

Duke of Qin
- Tenure: 659 – 621 BC
- Predecessor: Duke Cheng
- Successor: Duke Kang
- Full name: Ancestral name: Ying (嬴); Given name: Renhao (任好); Posthumous name: Duke Mu (穆公) or; Duke Miu (繆公)
- Died: 621 BC
- Father: Duke De of Qin

Chinese name
- Chinese: 任好
Transcriptions
Standard Mandarin
- Hanyu Pinyin: Rènhǎo
- Wade–Giles: Jên-hao

Posthumous name
- Chinese: 秦穆公
- Literal meaning: The Solemn Duke of Qin
Transcriptions
Standard Mandarin
- Hanyu Pinyin: Qín Mùgōng
- Wade–Giles: Ch‘in Mu Kung

Duke Mu of Qin (died 621 BC), born Ying Renhao, was Duke of Qin. Sometimes considered one of the Five Hegemons of the Spring and Autumn period, Duke Mu greatly expanded the territory of Qin during the reign of King Xiang of Zhou. He was also known for his many talented advisors, such as Baili Xi, Jian Shu (蹇叔), Pi Bao (丕豹), and Gong Sun (公孫).

== Names ==
Ying Renhao is a Chinese name: Ying is the surname and Renhao is the given name. During his time in power, he would have simply been called Qin or the Duke of Qin (Qingong). The title Qin Mugong—the "Solemn Duke of Qin"—is a posthumous name bestowed by his successors as part of Chinese ancestral veneration. Despite this being a descriptive title, it is common in English to treat it as though it were a common name. All of these are the modern Mandarin pronunciations of the characters in his names; their reconstructed Old Chinese pronunciations are different.

== Life ==
He was the son of Duke De of Qin and the younger brother of Duke Cheng. He married Mu Ji (穆姬), the daughter of Duke Xian of Jin, and married his daughter Huai Ying (懷嬴) to two of Duke Xian's sons. He helped his son-in-law win the Battle of Chengpu against Chu; these two marriages led to the saying, "the Friendship of Qin and Jin" (秦晉之好), to denote political marriages and alliances based on marital bonds. He is also noted as the master of Bole, a famous horse expert whose skills became iconic in folklore and idioms.

During the early reign of Duke Mu of Qin, the state of Jin was a formidable power under the leadership of Duke Xian of Jin. However, after the death of Duke Xian, Jin was plunged into a state of internal conflict as Duke Xian's sons fought over the succession. One of them won the throne and became Duke Hui of Jin, but Jin was struck by a famine not long later and Duke Hui requested aid from Qin. Duke Mu of Qin sent relief food supplies and agricultural equipment to Jin. Qin was struck by famine later, but Jin had recovered and it turned to attack Qin rather than repaying the assistance it had received. Qin and Jin engaged in several battles over the next few years.

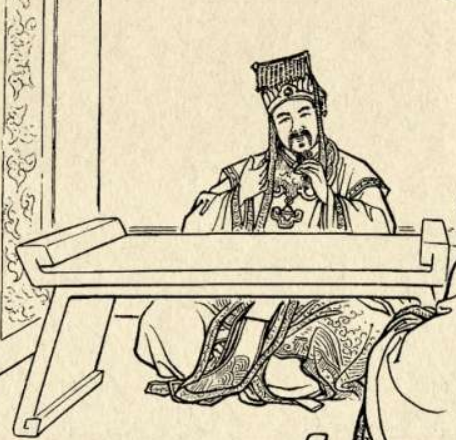
1957 illustration of Duke Mu at a table.

During the battles with Jin, Duke Mu heard that Duke Hui's older brother Ji Chong'er had gone from his northern and eastern wanderings to the southern court of Chu. After consulting his subjects, Duke Mu sent an emissary to Chu to invite Chong'er to Qin. Upon Duke Hui's death, his son fled from captivity in the Qin court to establish himself as the new duke. Instead of permitting this, Duke Mu sent his army to establish Chong'er as Duke Hui's successor, defeating the Jin army at the Battle of Gaoliang. Chong'er, now Duke Wen of Jin, was grateful for Duke Mu's assistance and relations between Qin and Jin improved. Qin used this opportunity when its eastern front was stable to launch military campaigns against the minority tribes in the west.

At this time, Qin and Jin were the most powerful states in China. Duke Wen of Jin expelled the Di barbarians and drove them into the region west of the Yellow River between the Yun and Luo rivers; there they were known as the Red Di and the White Di. Shortly afterwards, Duke Mu of Qin, having obtained the services of You Yu, succeeded in getting the eight barbarian tribes of the west to submit to their authority.

Thus, at this time, there lived in the region west of Long the Mianzhu, the Hunrong, and the Diyuan tribes. North of Mts. Qi and Liang and the Jing and Qi rivers lived the Yiqu, Dali, Wuzhi, and Quyuan tribes. North of Jin were the Forest Barbarians and the Loufan, while north of Yan lived the Eastern Barbarians and Mountain Barbarians. All of them were scattered about in their own little valleys, each with its own chieftain. From time to time they would have gatherings of a hundred or so men, but no one tribe was capable of unifying the others under a single rule.

Illustration of chaos in Jin with Duke Mu.

In 627 BC, Duke Mu of Qin planned a secret attack on the State of Zheng, but the Qin army retreated after being tricked into believing that Zheng was prepared for Qin's invasion. Duke Wen had died and his successor, Duke Xiang of Jin, ordered his troops to lay an ambush for the retreating Qin army. The Qin forces were defeated in an ambush by Jin at the Battle of Yao, near present-day Luoning County, Henan Province, and suffered heavy casualties. Three years later, Qin attacked Jin in revenge and scored a major victory. Duke Mu refused to advance further east after holding a funeral service for those killed in action at the Battle of Yao, and focused on the traditional policy of expanding Qin's borders in the west. Duke Mu's achievements in the western campaigns and his handling of foreign relations with Jin earned him a position among the Five Hegemons of the Spring and Autumn period.

== Family ==
He had at least two known sons: Ying and Hong. Ying succeeded him as Duke Kang of Qin. He also had several known daughters: Huai Ying (wife of Dukes Huai and Wen of Jin), Wen Ying (wife of Duke Wen of Jin), Qin Ying (wife of King Gong of Chu), Jianbi, and Nongyu (wife of Xiao Shi). It is unclear whether Huai Ying and Wen Ying were different names for the same daughter; likewise, some argue for the conflation of Jianbi and Nongyu.

- Great-great-grandfather: Duke Wen of Qin
- Great-grandfather: Duke Jing of Qin (秦靜公)
- Grandfather: Duke Xian of Qin
- Father: Duke De of Qin
  - Brothers: Duke Xuan of Qin, Duke Cheng of Qin
- Wife: Lady Mu (~672－637 BC), sister of Shensheng
  - Son: Duke Kang of Qin (d. 609 BC)
  - Daughter: Huai Ying (650 BC - 620 BC)
  - Daughter: Wenying
  - Daughter: Jianbi
  - Daughter: Nongyu

== Legacy ==
Duke Mu of Qin is remembered in the Huang Niao (黃鳥) poem in the Classic of Poetry, which recounts three members of the Ziche clan (子車), named Ziche Yansi, Ziche Zhongheng, and Ziche Qianhu, who served and followed him until the days they died.

=== Popular culture ===
In the manga and anime series Kingdom as well as a oneshot written by Yasuhisa Hara, he made an alliance with mountain tribes, after seeing his horse devoured by them, even giving the barbarians wine. Later, he fought against Jin, but was rescued by the same barbarians.

Duke Mu of Qin House of Ying Died: 621 BC
Regnal titles
Preceded by Duke Cheng of Qin	Duke of Qin; 659–621 BC	Succeeded by Duke Kang of Qin
