= King Zhuang of Chu =

King of Chu from 613 to 591 BC

King Zhuang of Chu 楚莊王
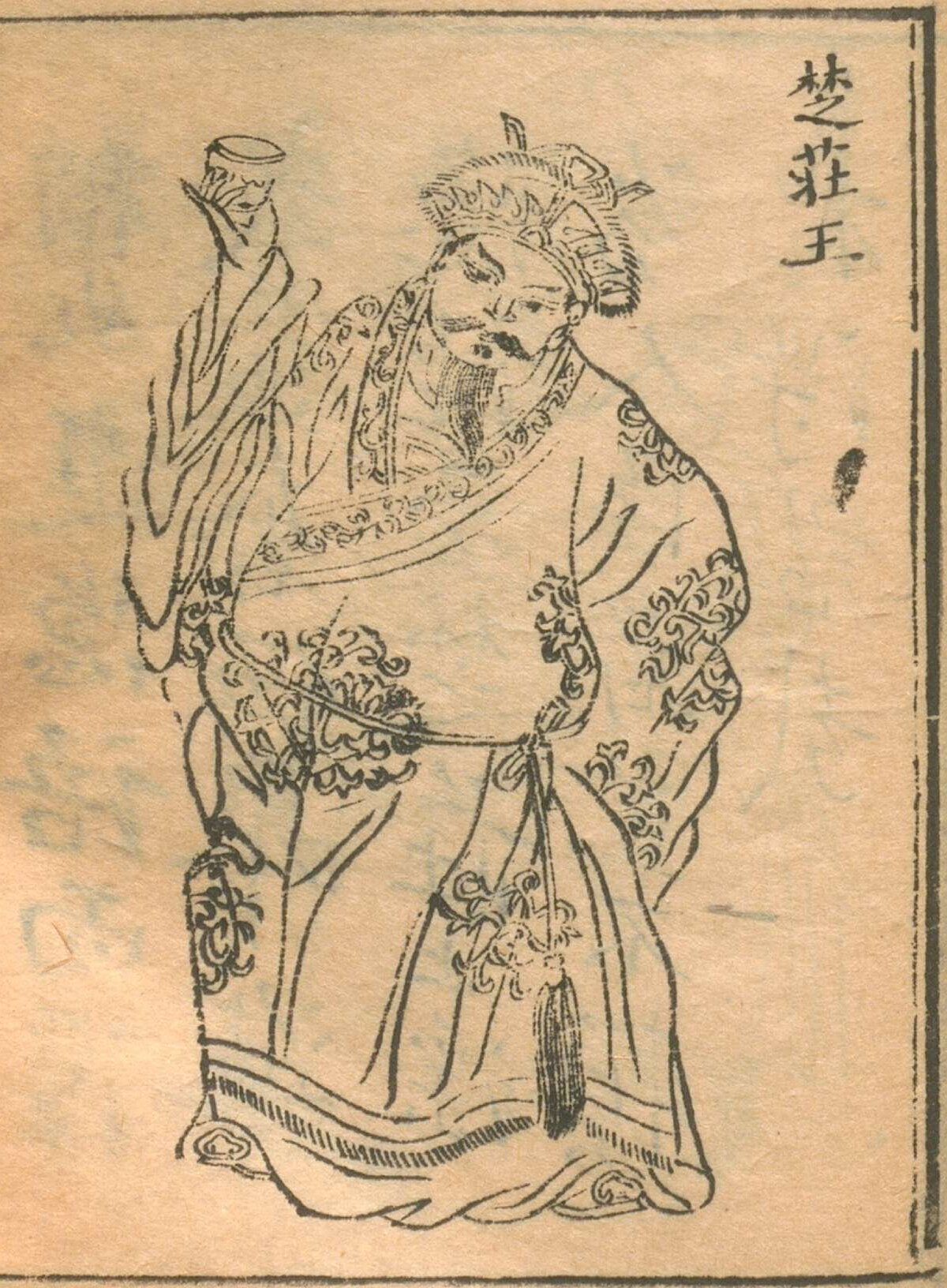

King of Chu
- Reign: 613–591 BC
- Predecessor: King Mu
- Successor: King Gong
- Died: 591 BC
- Spouse: Lady Fan
- Issue: King Gong
Names
- Ancestral name: Mǐ (羋); Clan name: Xióng (熊); Given name: Lǚ (旅 or 呂 or 侶)
Posthumous name
- King Zhuang (莊王) or King Zang (臧王) or King Jingzhuang (荊莊王)
- House: Mi
- Dynasty: Chu
- Father: King Mu

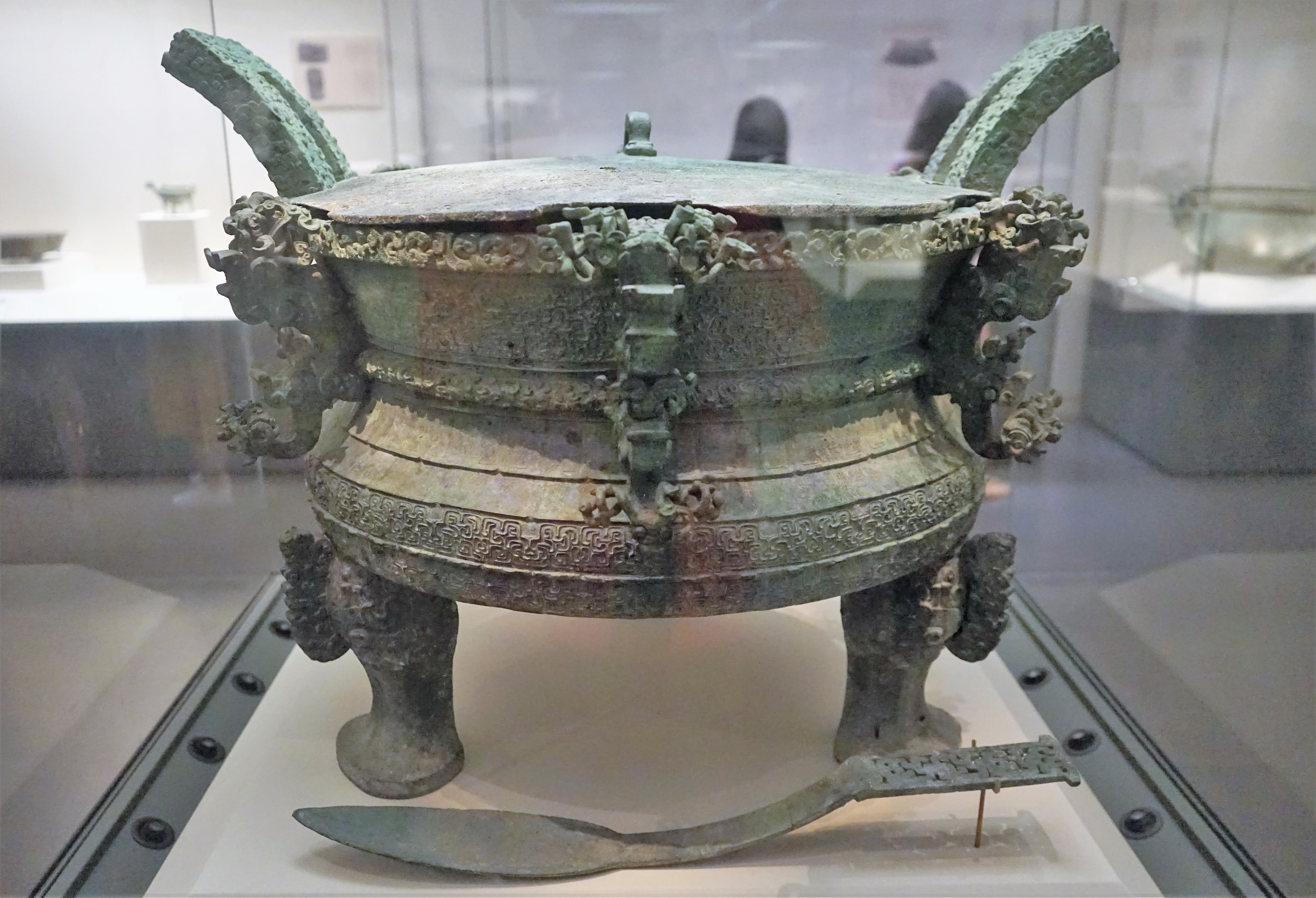
"Wangzi Wu" bronze ding. The inscription inside the ding documents that Prince Wu worshipped his ancestors and prayed for his offspring. Wu was a son of King Zhuang.

King Zhuang of Chu (Chinese: 楚莊王; pinyin: Chǔ Zhuāng Wáng), personal name Xiong Lü, was a monarch of the Chu state. He was one of the "Five Hegemons" who attempted to wrest control of China during the Spring and Autumn period.

== Life ==
The son of King Mu, King Zhuang ascended the throne in 613 BC. According to a legend in the Records of the Grand Historian, for the first three years of his reign King Zhuang wasted time in pleasure-seeking, but, when challenged by two courtiers, reformed his ways.

The king made Sunshu Ao his chancellor. Sunshu Ao began a series of major dam-works and an enormous planned reservoir in modern-day northern Anhui.

After some military successes, King Zhuang attempted to usurp King Ding of Zhou. According to a well-known story, probably an invention of the Warring States period, he asked a messenger from Zhou about the weight of the legendary Nine Tripod Cauldrons which Zhou possessed, a euphemism for seeking ultimate power in China, but was rebuffed. This incident gave rise to the chengyu "to enquire about ding in the central plains", i.e. to have great ambitions (問鼎中原; 问鼎中原; wèn dǐng zhōngyuán).

In the Battle of Bi, his army defeated the state of Jin. His progress from lazy regent to hegemon gave rise to the Chinese chengyu "amaze others with one cry" (一鳴驚人; 一鸣惊人; yī míng jīngrén).

King Zhuang of Chu House of Mi Died: 591 BC
Regnal titles
Preceded by King Mu of Chu	King of Chu; 613–591 BC	Succeeded by King Gong of Chu
