= King Cheng of Chu =

Ruler of Chu state from 671–626 BC

King Cheng of Chu 楚成王
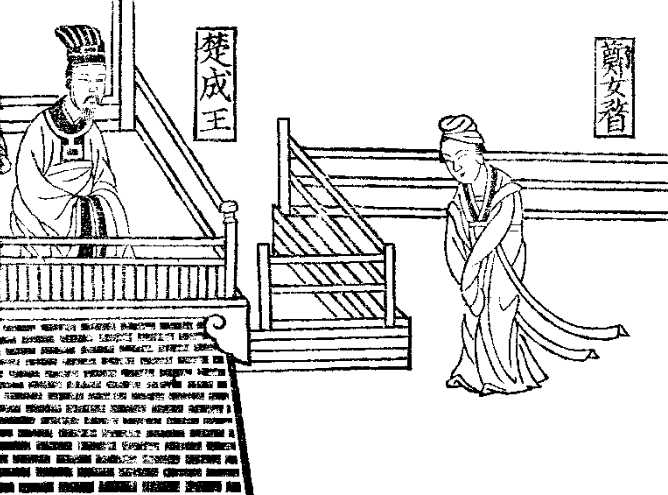
- Qing dynasty woodblock print showing King Cheng with Zheng Mao.

King of Chu
- Reign: 671–626 BC
- Predecessor: Du'ao
- Successor: King Mu
- Died: 626 BC
- Issue: King Mu; Xiong Zhi (熊職)
Names
- Ancestral name: Mǐ (羋); Lineage name: Xióng (熊); Given name: Yùn (惲)
Posthumous name
- King Cheng (成王)
- House: Mi
- Dynasty: Chu
- Father: King Wen
- Mother: Xi Gui (息媯)

King Cheng of Chu (Chinese: 楚成王; pinyin: Chǔ Chéng Wáng), personal name Xiong Yun, was a ruler of the Chu state, ruling from 671 BC to 626 BC.

In 672 BC, King Cheng's older brother, Du'ao, attempted to have him killed. King Cheng escaped to the Sui state. He then attacked and killed Du'ao with the help of Sui, and succeeded Du'ao as king of Chu.

== Life ==
In the summer of 648 BC, the State of Huang was annexed by the state of Chu.

King Cheng's wife was Zheng Mao. Their son was possibly King Mu of Chu.

The Shiji gives a detailed account of the events surrounding King Cheng's succession and untimely end. In the forty-sixth year of his reign (626 BC), Cheng wanted to make Shangchen (商臣), the future King Mu, his crown prince. Lingyin (title for prime minister of Chu) Zishang (子上) advised against this, fearing that there were many contenders for the position and that, if the king were to change his mind and act to replace the crown prince, a disturbance would ensue. He also warned the king that Shangchen was a cruel and fierce man who was unsuitable for the position. Not heeding the advice, King Cheng made Shangchen his crown prince.

Soon, the king did indeed change his mind, and rumors spread that the crown prince was about to be deposed, and another son Zhi (職) was going to be made the new crown prince. The crown prince was unsure whether to believe the rumors. His tutor advised him to throw a banquet for the king's favorite concubine but to treat her disrespectfully during the banquet. The prince did what was suggested, and the concubine, angered by her poor treatment, told the crown prince, "It is suitable that the king wants to kill you and make Zhi his crown prince!" Now sure of the king's intentions, the prince's tutor asked him, "Are you able to serve under Zhi?" "No," he answered. "Are you able to go into exile?" "No," he answered. Finally, he asked, "Are you able to do something big?" "Yes," the prince replied.

During the tenth month, Shangchen led palace troops to surround King Cheng and force him to commit suicide. King Cheng asked to eat a bear paw before dying, but he was rebuffed. On day dingwei, King Cheng hanged himself, and Shangchen ascended the throne.

King Cheng of Chu House of Mi Died: 626 BC
Regnal titles
Preceded by Du'ao	King of Chu; 671–626 BC	Succeeded by King Mu of Chu
