= Eastern Zhou =

Second half of the Zhou dynasty (c. 770 – 256 BC)

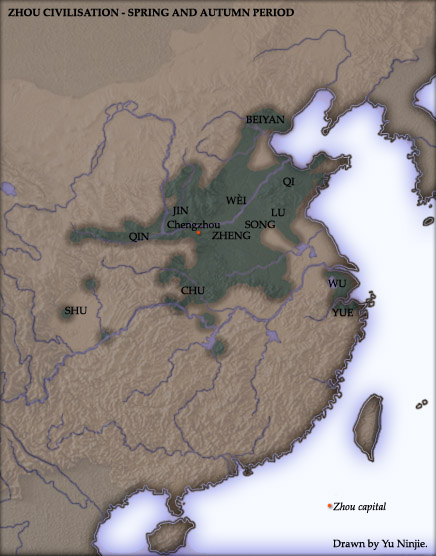
- Chinese territory during the early Eastern Zhou dynasty
- Traditional Chinese: 東周
- Simplified Chinese: 东周
Transcriptions
Standard Mandarin
- Hanyu Pinyin: Dōngzhōu; Dōng Zhōu
- Wade–Giles: Tung^{1}-chou^{1} Tung^{1} Chou^{1}
- IPA: /tʊŋ⁵⁵ ʈ͡ʂoʊ̯⁵⁵/

The Eastern Zhou (/dʒoʊ/; c. 770–256 BC) is a period in Chinese history comprising the latter half of the Zhou dynasty, following the Western Zhou era and the royal court's relocation eastward from Fenghao to Chengzhou (near present-day Luoyang). The Eastern Zhou was characterised by the weakened authority of the Ji family, the Zhou royal house. It is subdivided into two parts: the Spring and Autumn period (c. 770 – c. 481 or 476 BC), during which the ancient aristocracy still held power in a large number of separate polities, and the Warring States period (c. 481 or 476 – 221 BC), which saw the consolidation of territory and escalation of interstate warfare and administrative sophistication.

== History ==
=== Establishment ===
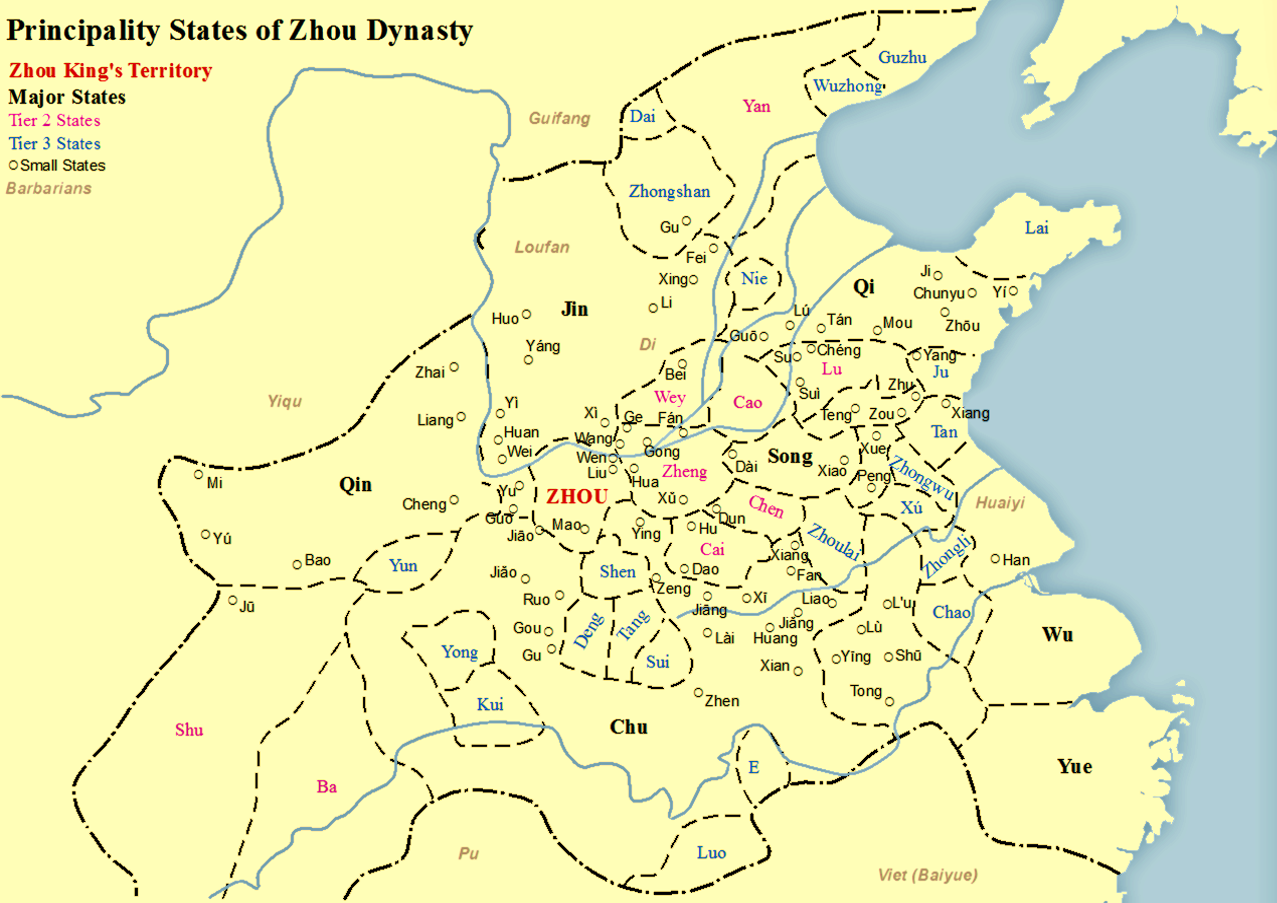
Map of the major Chinese states of the Eastern Zhou

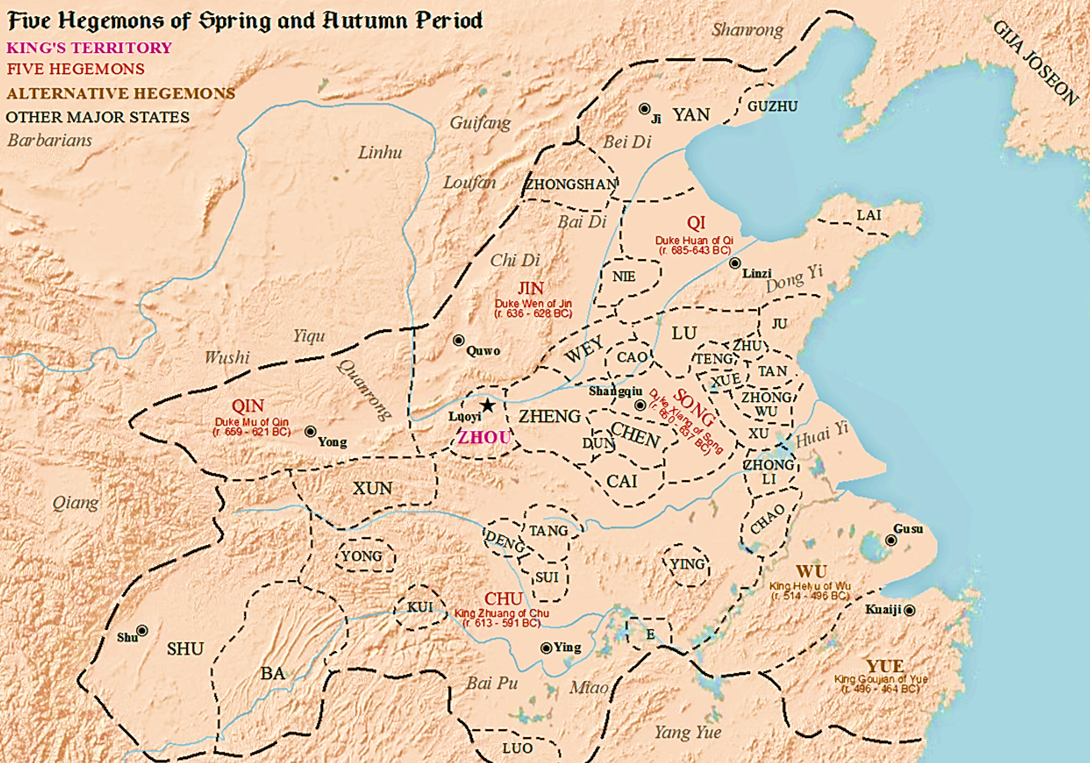
Map of the Five Hegemons of the Spring and Autumn period of the Eastern Zhou

According to traditional historical texts such as the Records of the Grand Historian, the Zhou capital was moved from Haojing (Chang'an District in Xi'an) to Chengzhou (Luoyang) in 770 BC. With the death of King You, the last king of the Western Zhou Dynasty, Crown Prince Yijiu was proclaimed the new king by the nobles from the states of Zheng, Lü, Qin and the Marquess of Shen. He became King Ping. In the second year of his reign, he moved the capital east to Luoyi as Quanrong people invaded Haojing, spelling the end of the Western Zhou dynasty.

The recently discovered Xinian Manuscript has challenged this view. Of the beginning of the Eastern Zhou period, it says:

The rulers of the states and various officials thereupon established the younger brother of King You, Yuchen, at Guo: this was King Hui from Xie. Twenty-one years after his establishment, marquis Wen of Jin named Qiu killed King Hui at Guo. For nine years Zhou was without a king, and the rulers of the states and regional lords then for the first time ceased attending the Zhou court. Thereupon, marquis Wen of Jin greeted King Ping at Shao'e and established him at the Royal Capital. After three years, he relocated eastward, stopping at Chengzhou.

Instead of King Ping being immediately accepted by the regional lords after his father's death, the Xinian claims that his uncle Yuchen was crowned as King Hui at Xie (somewhere in the state of Guo). After he was killed in 750 BC, there was no officially recognized king of Zhou for 9 more years, until marquis Wen of Jin brought Ping from Shao'e to the Royal Capital (almost certainly referring to Haojing) and enthroned him. Only three years after that in 738 BC did he move to Chengzhou.

The Xinian manuscript is controversial. Marquis Wen of Jin was thought to have reigned from 781 to 746 BC, and so he could not have proclaimed Ping as king in 741 BC nor move him to Chengzhou in 738 BC. However, the strongest argument in favor of the Xinian's telling of events about King Ping comes from a passage in the Zuo Zhuan, which reads in its entry for the 22nd year of Duke Xi (638 BC):

Earlier, when King Ping had moved the capital to the east, Xin You had gone to Yichuan and, upon seeing someone with unbound hair offering a sacrifice in the countryside, he said: "Within one hundred years this likely will be the Rong's [territory]! Ritual propriety had been lost already!" In autumn, Qin and Jin moved the Rong of Luhun to Yichuan.

The 'prophecies' in the Zuo Zhuan do not appear to have been made randomly and are usually precisely correct except in cases where state calendars differed slightly or when the prophecy was set to happen after the Zuo Zhuan was compiled. This prophecy is completely incorrect according to the traditional telling of King Ping's move east, but lines up perfectly with the Xinian's date.

=== Spring and Autumn period ===
The first half of the Eastern Zhou dynasty, from approximately 771 to 476 BC, was called the Spring and Autumn period, during which more and more dukes and marquesses obtained regional autonomy, defying the king's court in Luoyi, and waging wars amongst themselves. The period's name derives from the Spring and Autumn Annals, a chronicle of the state of Lu between 722 and 479 BC, which tradition ascribed to Confucius as its author or editor.

After moving the capital east, the Zhou royal family fell into a state of decline. Also, King Ping's popularity fell as rumors circulated that he had killed his father. With vassals becoming increasingly powerful, strengthening their position through defeating other rival states, and increasing invasion from neighboring countries, the king of Zhou was not able to master the country. Constantly, he would have to turn to the powerful vassals for help. The most important vassals, known later as the twelve vassals, came together in regular conferences where they decided important matters, such as military expeditions against foreign groups or against offending nobles. During these conferences one vassal ruler was sometimes declared hegemon. Chancellor Guan Zhong of Qi initiated the policy of "Revering the King and Expelling the Barbarians" (尊王攘夷), much later adapted by the imperial Japanese as "sonnō jōi". Adopting and adhering to it, Duke Huan of Qi assembled the vassals to strike down the threat of barbarians from the country.

In 635 BC, the Chaos of Prince Dai took place. King Xiang turned to Duke Wen of Jin for help, who killed Prince Dai and was rewarded with rule over Henei and Yangfan. In 632 BC, King Xiang was forced by Duke Wen of Jin to attend the conference of vassals in Jiantu.

In 606 BC, King Zhuang of Chu inquired for the first time regarding the "weight of the Nine Tripod Cauldrons" only to be rebuffed by the Zhou minister Wangsun Man (王孫滿). Asking such a question was, at that time, a direct challenge to the power and authority of the reigning dynasty.

=== Warring States period ===
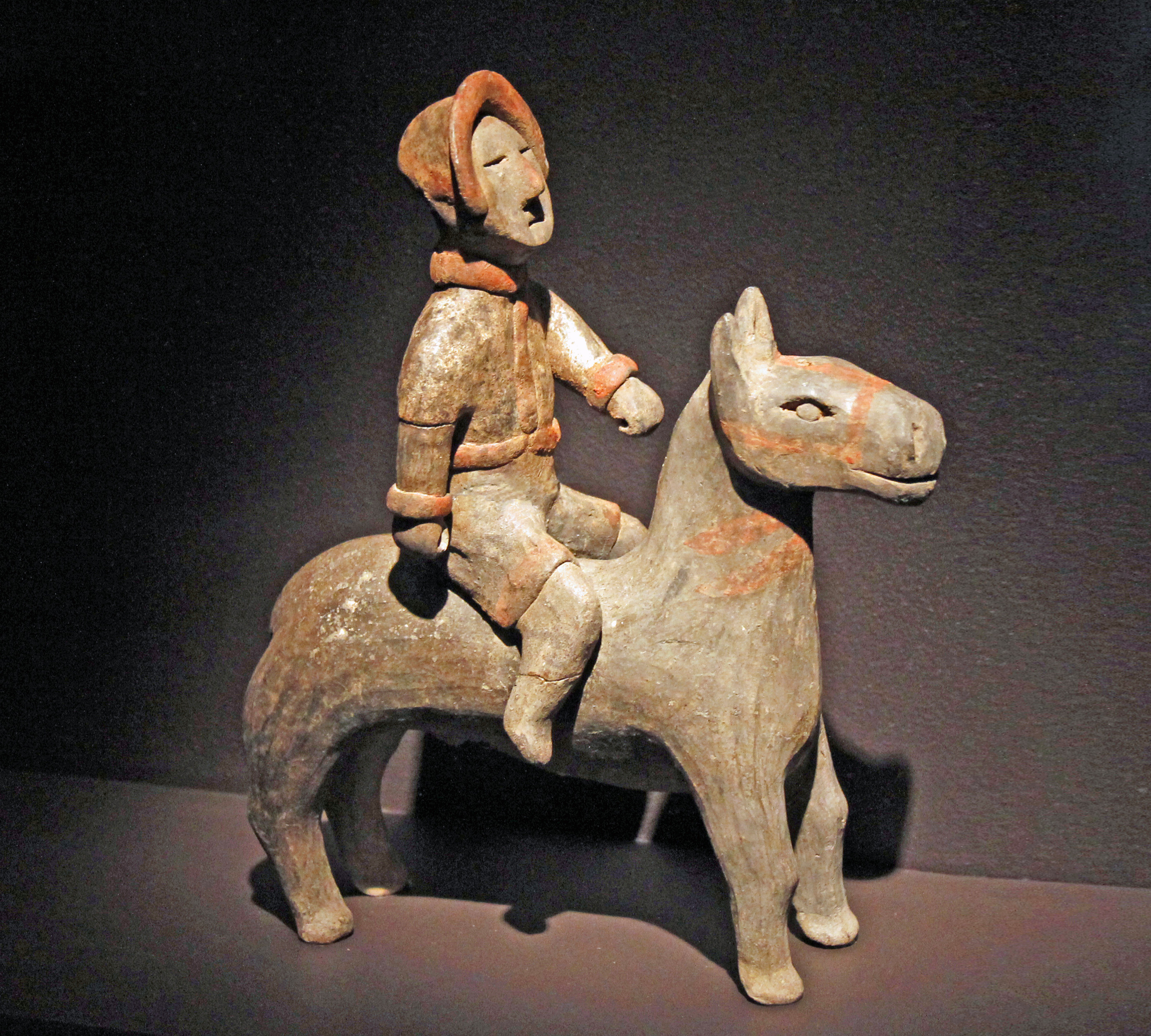
The Taerpo horserider, a Qin terracotta figurine from a tomb in the Taerpo cemetery near Xianyang in Shaanxi, 4th-3rd century BC. This is the earliest known representation of a cavalryman in China. The outfit is of Central Asian style, probably Scythian, and the rider with his large nose appears to be a foreigner. King Zheng of Qin (246–221 BC) is known to have employed steppe cavalry men in his army, as seen in his Terracotta Army.

Dating the end of the Spring and Autumn period and the beginning of the Warring States period that followed is a matter of continuing disagreement in Chinese scholarship. Western scholars often use the end of the Spring and Autumn Annals themselves as the dividing line, placing it around 481 BC. The usual Chinese convention since Sima Qian has, however, been to place the division at the gradual partition of Jin, one of the most powerful states, around 476 BC. (The years dividing the last and initial years are usually identical in the Julian calendar because the events themselves were originally dated using China's traditional lunisolar system. See the notes at "Spring and Autumn period" for further dates, details, and sourcing.)

During the Warring States period, many of the leading vassals' clamoring for kingship further limited the Zhou royal family's influence.

By the time of King Nan, the kings of Zhou had lost almost all political and military power, as even their remaining crown land was split into two states or factions, led by rival feudal lords: West Zhou, where the capital Wangcheng was located, and East Zhou, centered at Chengzhou and Kung. King Nan managed to preserve his weakened dynasty through diplomacy and conspiracies for 59 years until his deposition and execution by Qin in 256 BC. Seven years later, West Zhou was conquered by Qin.

The Warring States period extended beyond this event, however, concluding with end of the Qin wars of conquest. Those wars resulted in the annexation of all other contender states and were completed in 221 BC. Shi Huangdi, the First Emperor, avoided the clan-based organization of the Zhou and established a centralized bureaucratic state subsequently known as the Qin dynasty.

== Kings ==
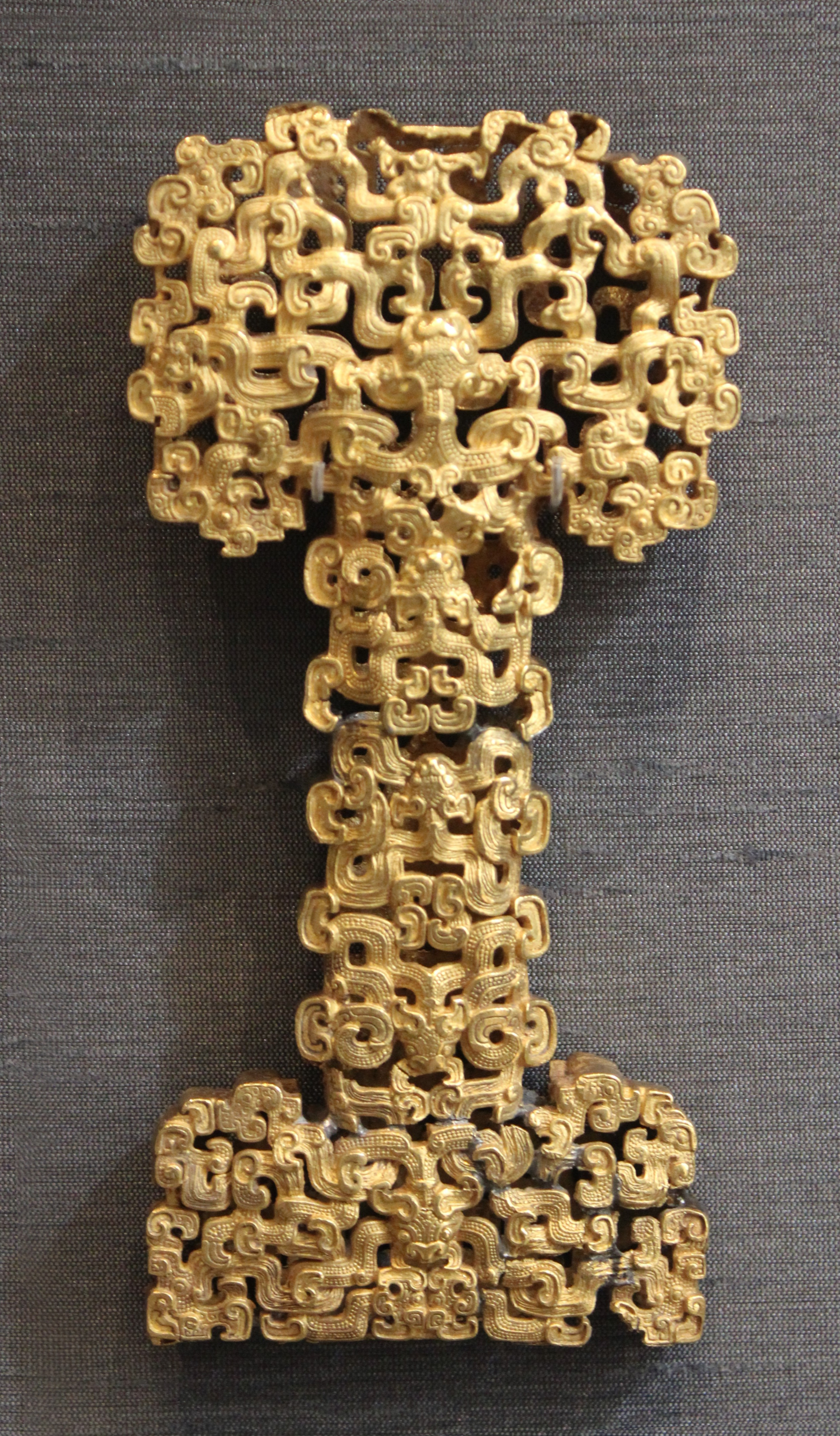
Gold sword hilt, Eastern Zhou, 6–5th century BC. British Museum.

The rulers of the Eastern Zhou dynasty were titled wang (王), which was also the title previously used by the Shang and Western Zhou. It is normally translated into English as 'king' to distinguish them from the later emperors titled huangdi (皇帝). In English, the usual convention is to treat their posthumous names as their personal regnal names. Yijiu of the royal Ji lineage was known during his reign simply as the king and posthumously referenced as the "Peaceful King of the Zhou" (周平王), which English scholars employ as the 'name' King Ping. The two King Jings are, however, not usually numbered, as their names are romanizations of different Chinese characters.

- King Ping — Ji Yijiu (772–720 BC)
- King Xie — Ji Yuchen (770–760 or 771–750 BC)
- King Huan — Ji Lin (719–697 BC)
- King Zhuang — Ji Tuo (696–682 BC)
- King Xi — Ji Huqi (681–677 BC)
- King Hui — Ji Lang (676–652 BC)
- King Xiang — Ji Zheng (651–619 BC)
- King Qing — Ji Renchen (618–613 BC)
- King Kuang — Ji Ban (612–607 BC)
- King Ding — Ji Yu (606–586 BC)
- King Jian — Ji Yi (585–572 BC)
- King Ling — Ji Xiexin (571–545 BC)
- King Jing — Ji Gui (544–520 BC)
- King Dao — Ji Meng (520 BC)
- King Jing — Ji Gai (519–477 BC)
- King Yuan — Ji Ren (476–469 BC)
- King Zhending — Ji Jie (468–441 BC)
- King Ai — Ji Quji (441 BC)
- King Si — Ji Shu (441 BC)
- King Kao — Ji Wei (440–426 BC)
- King Weilie — Ji Wu (425–402 BC)
- King An — Ji Jiao (401–376 BC)
- King Lie — Ji Xi (375–369 BC)
- King Xian — Ji Bian (368–321 BC)
- King Shenjing — Ji Ding (320–315 BC)
- King Nan — Ji Yan (314–256 BC)

== Society ==
The dominant material for making tools had become iron by the end of the Eastern Zhou; as such, it is considered to be the beginning of the Iron Age in China. There was a considerable development in agriculture with a consequent increase in population. There were constantly fights between vassals over land or other resources. People started using copper coins. Education was made universal for civilians. The boundaries between the nobility and the civilians subsided. A revolutionary transformation of the society was taking place, to which the patriarchal clan system made by the Zhou Dynasty could no longer adapt.

== See also ==
- Western Zhou dynasty
- List of Chinese dynasties
