= Yu Rang =

Jin assassin of the Spring and Autumn period

Yu Rang (traditional 豫讓; simplified 豫让, fl. mid-5th-century BC) was a legendary Chinese assassin.

== Life according to the legend ==
=== Background ===
Yu Rang was an assassin in the early days of the Warring States period. He lived in the State of Jin (晉). He was a grandson of Bi Yang.

Yu was the family-minister of Fan Jishe and Zhonghang Yin who were two of six influential ministers of the Jin State. But Yu formed the view that Fan Jishe and Zhonghang Yin did not properly appreciate his services, so he left those families and served Zhi Yao (智伯瑶) (also known as Zhi Bo) instead. In return Zhi Yao greatly appreciated Yu Rang's service. In a cruel conflict, the Fan Family and Zhonghang Family were defeated by the four families Zhi, Zhao, Wei, Han. But Zhi Yao was too greedy, and the other three families formed an alliance to eliminate the Zhi clan in the aftermath of Battle of Jinyang and killed Zhi Yao in 453 BC. Because Viscount Zhao Xiangzi, brother of the Marquess Xian of Zhao, had hated Zhi Yao deeply, he actually used the skull of Zhi Yao as a drinking cup.

=== Lavatory assassination plot ===
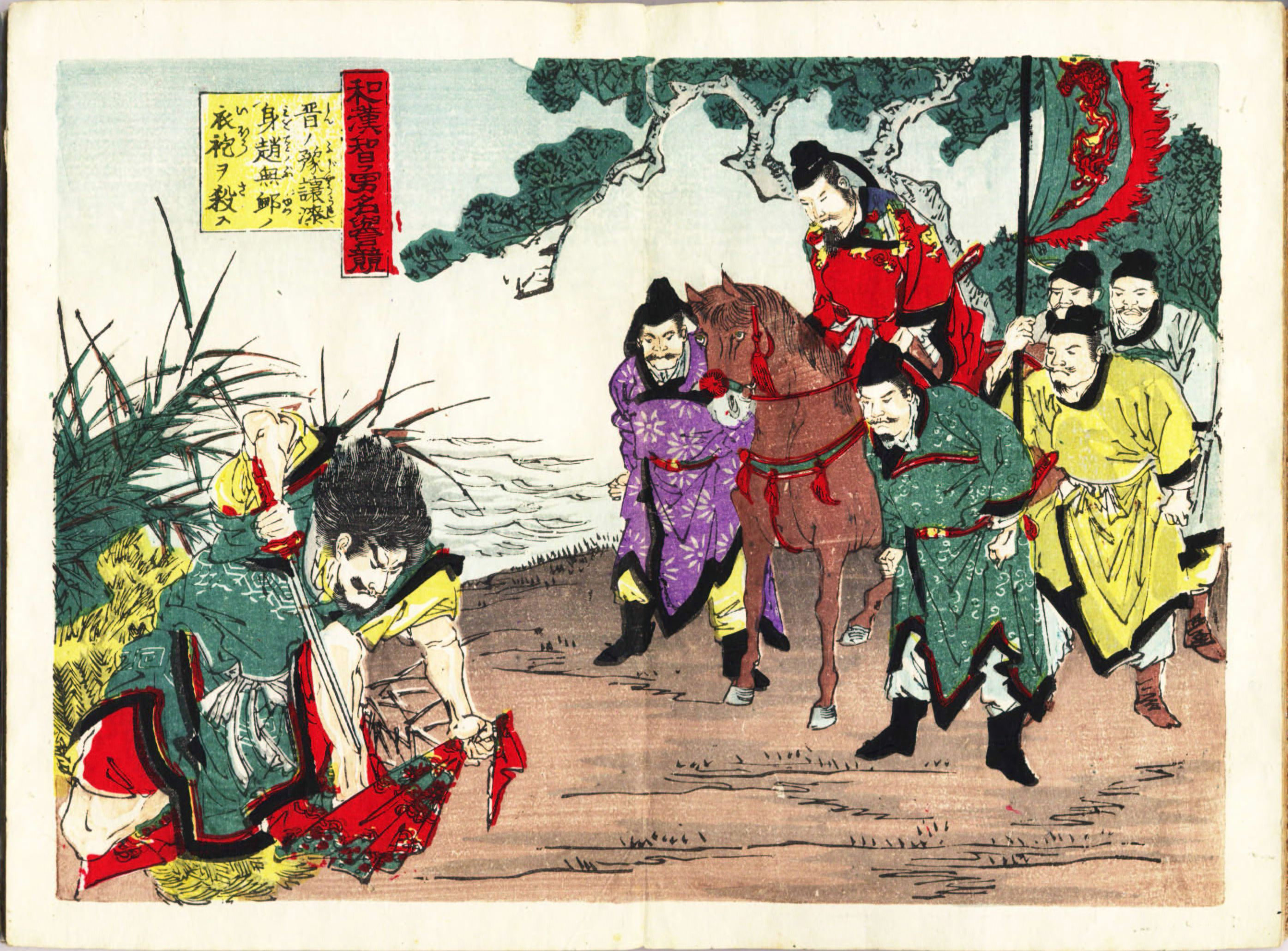
Yu Rang cutting the robe of Viscount Zhao Xiangzi thrice (晋豫讓淶身趙無䘏衣袍殺). Unknown ukiyo-e artist, approx. 1890

Yu Rang fled to the mountains and swore revenge for the Zhi Family. Yu changed his name and became a servant in the palace of Jin's monarch. One day he hid in a lavatory with the aim of murdering Zhao Xiangzi. But Zhao Xiangzi grew suspicious and had his soldiers search the lavatory. The soldiers found Yu Rang and discovered that he had a dagger. Zhao Xiangzi pointed his sword towards Yu and asked what he had planned to do. Yu Rang answered that he wanted to avenge his former lord, Zhi Bo. Zhao Xiangzi's soldiers were ready to kill him, but Zhao Xiangzi showed respect for Yu Rang's moral righteousness and ordered Yu Rang to be released.

=== Disguising as a beggar ===
Yu Rang knew Zhao Xiangzi would recognize him if their paths crossed again, so he disfigured himself by having his skin covered with lacquer to create scars and sores. He pulled out his teeth and became a beggar in a market. He was so changed that even his wife could only identify him by his voice. To change his voice, Yu Rang swallowed charcoal.

A friend of his was worried about Yu's plans and tried to persuade him to choose another approach to achieve his mission: "You have many abilities and you can serve Zhao Family. They will trust you. Then, you can easily do what you plan to do." Yu Rang answered, "Because I was the family-minister of Zhi Bo, I want to avenge him. Doing so shows faithfulness. But if I serve Zhao Xiangzi and kill him then I am no longer a faithful person."

=== Assassination plot at a bridge ===
Armed with a sword, one day Yu Rang lurked under a bridge. When Zhao Xiangzi made his way over the bridge, his horses were suddenly startled as Yu Rang approached. Zhao Xiangzi recognized Yu despite his beggar disguise, and his soldiers arrested Yu Rang. Zhao Xiangzi interrogated him, and Yu Rang explained that it still was his duty to avenge his former master Zhi Bo, even though he personally had nothing to gain from doing so. Zhao Xiangzi sighed and was moved that Yu Rang was still being loyal to Zhi Bo. However, felt it was enough that he had already released him one time. So he decided to not release Yu Rang again, and ordered his soldiers to surround him.

Yu Rang responded by saying, "You once released me, and everyone praised your virtue. Today I am ready to die. So all I ask is to cut your robe and thus satisfy my mind that I have achieved my revenge." Zhao Xiangzi deemed Yu Rang to be a faithful man, and gave his robe to Yu Rang. Yu Rang stabbed the robe three times, crying to heaven that now he was ready to report in front of Zhi Bo. He then killed himself with his own sword. After his death, Yu Rang's story spread throughout China and Japan, and people were touched by his loyalty.

== Literature ==
- Sima Qian: War-Lords, Southside, Edinburgh 1974. p. 24, p. 136 et seq. (Google Books)
- Mark Edward Lewis: Sanctioned Violence in Early China, p. 77 et seq. in: Contemporary Studies in Philosophy and Literature. SUNY series in Chinese philosophy and culture. SUNY Press, New York 1990. ISBN 978-0-79-140076-0 (Google Books)
- Chen Huaxin: Grand review of Chinese ancient dynasties, Shenzhen: Haitian Press 1993 (陳華新(1993), <<中國歷代宦官大觀>>, 深圳:海天出版社)
