= Xiangzi =

Xiangzi may refer to:

== Posthumous names ==
- Zhi Yao (died 453 BC), also known as Xiangzi of Zhi (知襄子; Zhī Xiāngzǐ), ruler of Zhi during the Spring and Autumn period
- Zhao Wuxu (died 425 BC), also known as Xiangzi of Zhao (趙襄子; Zhào Xiāngzǐ), head of the House of Zhao in Jin during the Spring and Autumn period
- Wei Manduo (fl. 4th century BC), also known as Xiangzi of Wei (魏襄子; Wèi Xiāngzǐ), ruler of Wei during the Warring States period

== Others ==
- Han Xiangzi (韓湘子; Hán Xiāngzǐ), Chinese mythological figure and one of the Eight Immortals
- Xiangzi (祥子; Xiángzǐ), the protagonist of Rickshaw Boy by Lao She
- The Case (箱子; Xiāngzǐ), 2007 Chinese film
- Xiangzi (巷子; Xiàngzĭ), narrow alleys in Chinese cities, see Hutong and Longtang
