= Marquess Lie of Zhao =

Ruler of the Chinese State of Zhao from 409 to 400 BCE

Marquess Lie of Zhao 趙烈侯

Marquess of Zhao
- Reign: 403 BCE - 400 BCE
- Predecessor: New title
- Successor: Duke Wu of Zhao (趙武公)

Leader of Zhao clan
- Reign: 409 BCE - 403 BCE
- Predecessor: Zhao Huan
- Successor: became Marquess of Zhao
- Died: 400 BCE
Names
- Ancestral name: Yíng (嬴); Lineage name: Zhào (趙); Given name: Jí (籍)
Posthumous name
- Marquess Lie (烈侯)
- House: Ying
- Dynasty: Zhao
- Father: Zhao Huan

Chinese name
- Chinese: 趙烈侯
Transcriptions
Standard Mandarin
- Hanyu Pinyin: Zhào Liè Hóu

Marquess Lie of Zhao (died 400 BCE), personal name Zhao Ji, was the founding marquess of the Zhao state during the Warring States period of China. His father was Count Xian (later posthumously promoted to Marquess Xian).

During his reign, Marquess Lie employed righteous government officials, including Gong Zhonglian (公仲連), Niu Xu (牛畜), Xun Xin (荀欣) and Xu Yue (徐越), whilst he followed the virtuous "Way of the King" (王道).

When cavalry from the Zhongshan state attacked Zhao, Marquess Lie allied himself with Marquess Wen of Wei to counterattack Zhongshan. Thereafter, he moved the Zhao capital to Handan.

In the sixth year of Marquess Lie's reign (403 BCE), Zhao, along with Wei and Han, became fiefs of the Eastern Zhou dynasty as a result of the Partition of Jin.

Marquess Lie died in 400 BCE. Since his son Zhao Zhang was underaged at the time, Marquess Lie's younger brother, Duke Wu of Zhao (趙武公), succeeded him as ruler.
