= Battle of Jinyang =

Conflict between the Ancient Chinese states of Jin, Zhao and Zhi (455–453 BCE)

- Part of Spring and Autumn period
Date	455 BC – May 8, 453 BC
Location	Taiyuan, Shanxi
Result	Zhao victory, Zhi annihilated

Belligerents
House of Zhi; House of Wei (until 453 BC); House of Han (until 453 BC)	House of Zhao; House of Wei (453 BC); House of Han (453 BC)

Commanders and leaders
Zhi Yao	Zhao Xiangzi

The Battle of Jinyang (Chinese: 晉陽之戰) was fought in modern-day Taiyuan between the elite families of the State of Jin, the house of Zhao and the house of Zhi (智), in the Spring and Autumn period of China. The other houses of Wei and Han first participated in the battle in alliance with the Zhi, but later defected to ally with Zhao to annihilate the Zhi house. This event was a catalyst to the Tripartition of Jin in 434 BC, the forming of the three states of Zhao, Wei, and Han, and the start to the Warring States period. It is the first battle described in the Song Dynasty history compendium Zizhi Tongjian.

== Background ==
By 490 BC, after the destruction of the houses of Fan (范) and Zhonghang (中行), control of the State of Jin, then the largest state in China, was contested by four elite families: Zhi, Wei, Zhao, and Han. With multiple military victories to his credit, Zhi Yao (or Zhi Bo Yao 智伯瑤) of the house of Zhi exerted the most influence in the Jin court – all decisions of the state had to pass through him. He also controlled the most territory within the state. The reigning duke of Jin, Duke Ai, was powerless to restrain him. So Zhi Yao, in his pride, began to demand lands from the other three houses. The houses of Wei and Han reluctantly complied to evade Zhi's wrath, but Zhao Xiangzi (趙襄子) refused to cede the territories of Lin (藺) and Gaolang (皋狼), both in modern-day Lishi, to Zhi. Zhi, in retribution, formed a secret alliance with the houses of Wei and Han to attack Zhao.

Zhao Xiangzi suspected an attack from Zhi, since he had heard that Zhi sent envoys to Han and Wei three times, but never to Zhao. After rejecting suggestions to move to Zhangzi or Handan out of concern for the people there, Zhao Xiangzi asked his minister Zhang Mengtan (張孟談) where he could prepare his defence, and Zhang Mengtan suggested Jinyang because Jinyang had been well-governed for generations. Zhao agreed, and summoned Yanling Sheng (延陵生) to lead the army carriages and cavalry ahead to Jinyang, Zhao himself to follow later. Once in Jinyang, Zhao Xiangzi, following the suggestions of Zhang Mengtan, issued orders to refill the granaries and the treasuries, repair walls, make arrows, and melt copper pillars for metal. By virtue of past governance, the treasuries, granaries, and arsenals were filled within three days, and the walls repaired within five. Thus all of Jinyang was prepared for war.

== Battle ==
When the three armies of Zhi, Wei, and Han reached Jinyang in 455 BC, they laid siege to the city, but for three months they could not take the city. They fanned out and surrounded the city, and a year later diverted the flow of the Fen River to inundate the city. All buildings under three stories high were submerged, and the people of Jinyang were obliged to live in nest-like perches above the water and hang their kettles from the scaffolding in order to cook.

By the third year, supplies had run out for the Zhao, diseases broke out, and the populace were reduced to eating each other's children. Although the common people remained firm in the defence, the court ministers' loyalties began to waver. Zhao Xiangzi asked Zhang Mengtan, "Our provisions are gone, our strength and resources are exhausted, the officials are starving and ill, and I fear we can hold out no longer. I am going to surrender the city, but to which of the three states should I surrender?" Zhang Mengtan, much alarmed, persuaded Zhao not to surrender but instead send him out to negotiate with the houses of Wei and Han.

The houses of Wei and Han were promised an even split of Zhao's territories when the battle was won, however both the Wei and Han leaders were uneasy, since they understood that they too would be conquered if Zhao fell to Zhi. Zhi Yao's minister, Xi Ci (郤疵), warned Zhi that the two houses were going to revolt, since "the men and horses [of Jinyang] are eating each other and the city is soon to fall, yet the lords of Han and Wei show no signs of joy but instead are worried. If those are not rebellious signs, then what are they?" Zhi paid Xi Ci no heed, and instead told the lords of Han and Wei of Xi's suspicion. Xi, knowing that his warning fell to deaf ears, excused himself from the battlefield by going to the State of Qi as an envoy.

Indeed, when Zhang Mengtan secretly met with Wei Huan-zi and Han Kangzi (韓康子), who confessed that they were secretly planning to mutiny against Zhi. The three discussed their plans and settled on a date to execute the plans. Zhang Mengtan returned to Jinyang to report back to Zhao Xiangzi, and Zhao, in joy and apprehension, bowed to Zhang several times as a sign of great reverence.

One of Zhi Yao's clansmen, Zhi Guo (智過), by happenstance, observed the leaders of Wei and Han after the secret meeting, and warned Zhi Yao of the possibility that they might rebel, judging by their lack of restraints like before. Zhi again chose to put his trust in his two allies, saying: "Since I have been this good to them, they would surely not attack or deceive me. Our troops have invested Jinyang for three years. Now when the city is ready to fall at any moment and we are about to enjoy the spoils, what reason would they have for changing their minds?" Zhi told Wei and Han what Zhi Guo said, and the two learnt to be cautious when they saw Zhi Guo the next day. Zhi Guo, seeing the change in their looks, insisted to Zhi Yao that the two ought to be executed. Zhi Yao would not hear of it, and Zhi Guo suggested another plan to buy their friendship: to bribe the influential ministers Zhao Jia (趙葭) of Wei and Duan Gui (段規) of Han with enfeoffment of the Zhao lands. Zhi Yao rejected the proposal because the Zhao lands were going to split in three already, and he did not want to receive less than one third of the eventual spoils. Since Zhi Yao would not listen, Zhi Guo left him and changed his surname to Fu (輔) as a precaution.

Hearing this, Zhang Mengtan urged Zhao Xiangzi to take action immediately, lest Zhi Yao changes his mind. Zhao then dispatched Zhang Mengtan to the camps of Wei and Han, alerting them of the time of the final attack. On the night of May 8, 453 BC, Zhao troops killed the men guarding the dams of the Fen River and let the river flood the Zhi armies. As the Zhi armies fell into chaos trying to stop the water, the Wei and Han armies attacked Zhi from the sides and Zhao led his soldiers in a frontal attack. Together they inflicted a severe defeat on Zhi Yao's army and took him prisoner.

Zhao Xiangzi had a grudge on Zhi Yao because Zhi had often humiliated him in the past, thus he executed Zhi and made his skull into a winecup. No one in the house of Zhi was spared except for Zhi Guo's family, who had already changed their surnames and fled. The territories of Zhi were evenly distributed among the three victors.

== Aftermath ==
With the elimination of the Zhi house, control of the State of Jin fell to the remaining three families, their powers unchecked by anyone in the state. In 434 BC, following the death of Duke Ai, the three families annexed all of Jin's lands, leaving only the capital estates of Jiang and Quwo for the next duke of Jin. In 403 BC, the Wei, Zhao and Han lords all went to King Weilie of Zhou in Luoyang and were made marquises in their own right, establishing the three states of Zhao, Wei, and Han, ushering in the beginning of the Warring States period by Sima Guang's definition. Most historians, when referring to those three states, call them the "Three Jins" (三晉). The State of Jin continued to exist with a tiny piece of territory until 376 BC when the rest of the territory was partitioned by the Three Jins.

The Legalist thinker Han Feizi of the late Warring States period used this battle as an example of failure via greed and perversity, one of the "Ten Faults" that a ruler should not have. He reasoned that because Zhi Yao was too fond for profit, he opened himself to the destruction of the state and his own demise.

The Song Dynasty statesman Sima Guang, in his Zizhi Tongjian, attribute Zhi Yao's failure to his lacking virtue compared to his talents, and thus invited disaster.
