= Six Ministers =

Military leader and regent of the ancient Chinese state of Jin

Zhongjunjiang (Chinese: 中軍將) or Jiangzhongjun was the military leader and the prime minister of the ancient Chinese state of Jin. Literally, the word Zhongjunjiang means "General of central army". The post originally was named "Situ" (司徒). Zhongjunjiang was also known as "Jiangjun" (將軍), "Dazheng" (大政, 太政, 大正) and "Yuanshuai" (元帥). Since Zhao Dun's term as Zhongjunjiang, the post's jurisdiction was widened and its holder automatically obtains the regency of Jin. Historical evidence also indicate that Zhongjunjiang had the legislative power.

In 633 BCE, Duke Wen of Jin held a military parade in Beilu and announced his plan of military reform. The duke thereby established the central army in addition to the upper army and the lower army of Jin. Xi Hu was the first Zhongjunjiang appointed by the duke of Jin.

To hold the post of Zhongjunjiang, one has to be in the rank of Qing (卿). In Jin's history, six powerful vassal states of Jin and their leader held this post in turn. The six clans were known as the Liuqing of Jin (晋国六卿). Namely, the six clans were: Han, Zhao, Wei, Zhi, Zhonghang, and Fan. Luan and Xi clan were two clans which also possessed the status of qing but became extinct due to political struggles in Jin's court.

The dictatorial power of Zhongjunjiang led to the constant conflicts between the six vassal states of Jin. Approaching the end of its existence, Jin was troubled by the civil wars waged by its own retainers against each other. The last Zhongjunjiang before the partition of Jin was Xun Yao.

According to Chunqiu Dashibiao (春秋大事表) by Qing dynasty historian Gu Donggao, Zhongjunjiang is etymologically the origin of the Chinese words 將軍 and 元帥. The two alternative names of Zhongjunjiang later influenced the naming system of a certain country's military, especially China, Japan, Korea and Vietnam. The word 將軍 (Jiāngjūn, Shōgun, Changgun, Tướng quân, "General") derived from Zhongjunjiang. Another alternative name 元帥 (Yuánshuài, Gensui, Wansu, Nguyên soái) is used in the four countries as a translation and equivalent of the English word "Marshal".

== See also ==
- Six Ministers (ancient China), a more general term for senior ministers who were below only to Grand Chancellor and Three Ducal Ministers.

== List of Zhongjunjiang ==
- Xi Hu (郤縠), 633–632 BCE.
- Xian Zhen (先軫), 632–627 BCE.
- Xian Juju (先且居), 627–622 BCE.
- Zhao Dun (趙盾), 621–602 BCE
- Xi Que (郤缺), 601–598 BCE.
- Xun Linfu (荀林父), 597–594 BCE.
- Shi Hui (士會), 593–592 BCE.
- Xi Ke (郤克), 592–588 BCE.
- Luan Shu (欒書), 587–573 BCE.
- Han Jue (韓厥), 573–566 BCE.
- Xun Ying (荀罃), 566–560 BCE.
- Xun Yan (荀偃), 560–554 BCE.
- Shi Gai (士匄), 554–548 BCE.
- Zhao Wu (趙武), 548–541 BCE.
- Han Qi (韓起), 541-514 BCE.
- Wei Shu (魏舒), 514–509 BCE.
- Shi Yang (士鞅), 509–501 BCE.
- Xun Li (荀躒), 501–493 BCE.
- Zhao Yang (趙鞅), 493–475 BCE.
- Xun Yao (荀瑤), 475–453 BCE.
- Partition of Jin
- Zhao Wuxu (趙無恤), 453–425 BCE.
- Wei Si (魏斯), 425–403 BCE. Marquess Wen of Wei
