= Marquis Xian =

Marquis Xian may refer to:

- Marquis Xian of Jin (died 812 BC)
- Marquess Xian of Zhao (died 409 BC)
- Chen Ping (Han dynasty) (died 178 BC)
