= Shi Xie (disambiguation) =

Shi Xie may refer to:

== Shi Xie (士燮) ==
- Shi Xie, also known as Fan Xie (范燮) or Fan Wen-zi (范文子), head of the Fan lineage (范氏) of Qi clan (祁姓), one of the six major office-holding families of the state Jin in Spring–Autumn period.
- Shi Xie, official in late Han dynasty and early Three Kingdoms period.
