= Partition of Jin =

Division of the Chinese state of Jin into Han, Zhao, and Wei (481–403 BCE)

The Partition of Jin (simplified Chinese: 三家分晋; traditional Chinese: 三家分晉; pinyin: Sānjiā Fēn Jìn; lit. 'Three Families Partitioning Jin'), refers to the division of the State of Jin between rival families into the three states of Han, Zhao and Wei, a watershed event marking the division between the Spring and Autumn and Warring States periods. Proceeding from the Jin, the three states were often referred to as the "Three Jins" (三晋; 三晉; Sān Jìn).

Because the process took several decades, there is some debate among scholars as to the year which best marks the true partition of Jin. Kiser & Cai (2003) state that the most common dates picked by historians are 481, 475, 468, and 403 BCE. The last date, according to Sima Guang marks the conferring of Marquessates by King Weilie of Zhou on Wei Si, ruler of the State of Wei; Zhao Ji, ruler of the State of Zhao, and Han Qian, ruler of the State of Han.

In 386 BCE, the states of Han, Wei and Zhao deposed Duke Jing of Jin and divided the last remaining Jin territory between themselves, which marked the end of the Jin state.

== Background ==
Succession issues were constant in Jin as far back as the seventh century BCE. Even when, for example, King Xi of Zhou used his royal clout to give legitimacy to Wu of Quwo as the rightful duke of Jin in 678 BCE, succession issues continued to arise.

At the same time that the Jin duke was conquering new lands, a process of "subinfeudation" or "rear vassalage" occurred in the early and middle periods of the Spring and Autumn period, wherein aristocratic titles and territory were awarded to vassals loyal to Jin, rather than to the Zhou royal family. However, Jin was unique among the major states in a major respect; whereas other states often enfeoffed the cadet branches of the ruling house, Jin had a policy of exiling or disempowering its own cadet houses. Instead, powerful ministerial families emerged, which were granted fiefs similar to those of cadet houses in other states. For example, the house of Zhao descended from Zhao Cui, while the house of Wei descended from Wei Chou, both of whom were retainers of Duke Wen of Jin; the house of Han in turn descended from Han Wan, who was an uncle of Duke Wu of Jin.

Over time, while other powerful states (like Chu) were centralizing power through a rising bureaucracy, Jin continued to have a feudal power structure with aristocratic families ruling even individual counties. Over the course of a few generations, the major aristocratic families gained enough power to undermine the ruling duke's authority. During most of the seventh and sixth centuries BCE, Jin was composed of an assortment of semi-independent city-states fighting each other and the Jin Duke as much as they fought other states. In one extreme case, Viscount Xian of Xi, a retainer of Duke Jing of Jin, attempted to invade the state of Qi with only the troops under his command.

== Growing aristocracy ==
The House of Zhao (simplified Chinese: 赵; traditional Chinese: 趙) gained in prominence after Duke Wen placed them in charge of newly conquered lands such that, in 607 BCE, they deposed a duke that attempted to curb their political power. The Xian clan (先) was eliminated in 596 BCE. Duke Li of Jin encouraged the Luan clan (栾) to lead a military coalition that squashed the rising power of the Xi clan (郤). Subsequently, in 573, Luan supporters had Duke Li murdered and placed a puppet on the throne and the clan was then itself eliminated by 550, making the Zhi, Zhao, and Han (韩) clans the most powerful at about this time. Soon after, the Wei clan (魏) also grew in power.

In the lead-up to the civil war, the dominant clans were the Zhao, Wei, Han, Fan (范), Zhi (智) and Zhonghang (中行) who were collectively called the "Six Titled Retainers" (六卿; Lìu Qīng). These six aristocratic families dominated Jin in the late Spring and Autumn period, basically using the ruling duke as a figurehead until Jin was split into three separate states.

== Civil war ==
After the 546 BCE truce agreement between Jin and Chu (itself prompted in part by Jin's internal difficulties), conflicts between aristocrats and with the Duke escalated, and a civil war (497–453 BCE) commenced.

In 514 BCE, the forces of the Yangshe clan and the Qi clan were destroyed by a conspiracy involving Zhao, Han, Wei, Zhi, Zhonghang, and the Fan clan. During the time of Duke Ding of Jin (511–475), the Fan and Zhonghang clans were in turn eliminated, leaving only the Zhi, Zhao, Han, and Wei clans remaining. By about 450 BCE, the Zhi clan had become the most dominant and began demanding territory from the other clans.

=== Zhao's internal conflicts ===
In 497 BCE, Handan Wu of Handan's Zhao and Jianzi of Jinyang's Zhao became enemies with each other over ownership of 500 soldiers. Jianzi of Zhao insisted that Handan should transfer the 500 soldiers to Jinyang. After consulting with his clansmen, Handan Wu (also known as Zhao Wu of Handan) refused to accept his cousin Jianzi. Jianzi summoned Wu and imprisoned him for his trespass against the main branch of the Zhao clan. Later, Wu was executed by Jianzi.

The clan conflicts within the Zhao clan escalated to a higher level after the execution of Handan Wu. Wenzi of Zhonghang, whose nephew was executed, was enraged. Zhaozi of Fan, who intermarried with the Zhonghang clan, was also concerned with Zhao's imprudence on the matter of Handan's execution. When Handan Ji and Shebing started their rebellion against Jinyang's Zhao, Zhonghang and Fan clan intervened and supported the demands of the Handan clan.

In August 497 BCE, Zhonghang, Fan, and Handan attacked Zhao's forces and defeated them. Zhonghang and Fan's triumphs caused other vassal clans of the Duke of Jin to worry. Jianzi of Han, Xiangzi of Wei and Wenzi of Zhi invaded Zhonghang and Fan's fief under the name of Duke Ding of Jin. Wenzi of Zhonghang and Zhaozi of Fan eventually lost their struggle against Han, Zhao, Wei and Zhi. Their attempt of attacking the united force with the Jin duke inside was disastrous. After the battle, Zhonghang and Fan fled to Chao Ge while Jianzi of Zhao returned to the state of Jin.

The Handan conflict led to the decline of Zhonghang and the Fan clan, which prepared the way for the formation of Han, Zhao and Wei's hegemony in Jin's court.

Fan clan's resistance in Chao Ge was supported by Zhou dynasty, Qi, Lu, Wey and Zheng. Jianzi of Zhao waged numerous battles to eliminate the Fan clan. In 471 BCE, the Handan clan was eliminated by Jianzi. In 470 BCE, Zhaozi of Fan lost all his lands and fled to the state of Qi.

=== The Battle of Jinyang ===
Acting on his own accord, the Jin Minister Zhi Xiangzi used the Zhi clan's place in the Jin court to intimidate and demand territory from ministers Han Kangzi of the Han clan and Wei Huanzi of the Wei clan. After Zhao Xiangzi of the Zhao clan rejected Zhi Xiangzi's demands in 455 BCE, Zhi Xiangzi attacked the Zhao clan while compelling the Han and Wei clans to send troops to reinforce him.

Zhao Xiangzi retreated to the Jin city of Jinyang in 455 BCE, and the united forces laid siege to the city for two years, while also diverting water supplies away from it. Faced with a critical situation, Zhao Xiangzi sent an envoy who persuaded the Han and Wei clans to change sides. They arrived and diverted a huge stream of water that split Zhi Xiangzi's camp in two, then captured and killed Zhi Xiangzi. In 453 BCE, the Zhao, Han, and Wei clans annihilated the Zhi clan.

As their respective powers were so balanced, none of the three remaining aristocratic families felt they could feasibly gain an upper hand over the others. So, in 403 BCE, they divided the state's lands among themselves into the "three Jins" of Wei, Han, and Zhao. All three states quickly formed strong bureaucracies, thereby weakening the potential for any aristocratic families from encroaching on their power. This same year, King Weilie of Zhou proclaimed Jin, Wei, Han, and Zhao as equals.

== Remaining Jin lands ==
Duke Ai of Jin died in 434 BCE and was succeeded by Duke You of Jin. The Han, Zhao and Wei clans divided up surplus Jin territory amongst themselves, leaving only Jiang County and Quwo County (both in modern-day Shanxi Province) for Duke You of Jin.

Because Zhao Xiangzi was the younger son who had forced his way to the inheritance, he decided to name his elder brother Zhao Bolu and his descendants as heirs, with Bolu's grandson Zhao Xianzi eventually becoming the heir apparent. However, after Zhao Xiangzi died, his son Zhao Huanzi banished Zhao Xianzi and appointed himself ruler of the Zhao estates and paramount minister of Jin. Zhao Huanzi himself died a year later, whereupon the Zhao clan and vassals killed all of his sons and invited Zhao Xianzi back. Later on, Zhao Xianzi's son Marquess Lie of Zhao succeeded as ruler.

In 349 BCE, the Han and Zhao states divided the remaining Jin territory between themselves, thus marking the end of the state of State of Jin.

== Bibliography ==
- Blakeley, Barry B. (1979), "Functional disparities in the socio-political traditions of Spring and Autumn China: Part III: Ch'u and Chin", Journal of the Economic and Social History of the Orient, 22 (1): 81–118, doi:10.2307/3632147, JSTOR 3632147
- Hui, Victoria Tin-bor (2004), "Toward a dynamic theory of international politics: Insights from comparing ancient China and early modern Europe", International Organization, 58 (1): 175–205, doi:10.1017/s0020818304581067, S2CID 154664114
- Hsu, Cho-yun (1990), "The Spring and Autumn period", in Loewe, Michael; Shaughnessy, Edward L. (eds.), The Cambridge history of ancient China: from the origins of civilization to 221 B.C., Cambridge University Press, pp. 545–586, ISBN 9780521470308
- Kiser, Edgar; Cai, Yong (2003), "War and bureaucratization in Qin China: Exploring an anomalous case", American Sociological Review, 68 (4): 511–539, doi:10.2307/1519737, JSTOR 1519737
- Lewis, Mark Edward (2006). The Construction of Space in Early China. New York: State University of New York Press. ISBN 0-7914-6607-8..
- Zhao, Dingxin (2004), "Comment: Spurious Causation in a Historical Process: War and Bureaucratization in Early China", American Sociological Review, 69 (4): 603–607, doi:10.1177/000312240406900407, S2CID 143734027
