= Wei Huan-zi =

Leader of the Chinese State of Wei (died 446 BCE)

Viscount Huan of Wei
- 魏桓子

Leader of Wei clan
- Preceded by: Viscount Xiang
- Succeeded by: Marquess Wen

Personal details
- Died: 446 BC
- Children: Marquess Wen
- Parent: Viscount Xiang (Wei Manduo) (father)
- Names: Ancestral name: Jī (姬); Lineage name: Wèi (魏); Given name: Jū (駒)

Viscount Huan of Wei (Chinese: 魏桓子; pinyin: Wèi Huán Zǐ), personal name Wei Ju, was a leader of the Wei clan in the Jin state, where he served as dafu (大夫). He succeeded his father Wei Manduo (Viscount Xiang of Wei) as clan leader.

Together with Zhao Wuxu (Viscount Xiang of Zhao) and Han Hu (Viscount Kang of Han), Viscount Huan of Wei defeated Zhi Yao (Viscount Xiang of Zhi). Afterwards the three allies divided up the Zhi (知) territory and expanded their own state borders making them larger than the other states.

After Viscount Huan of Wei died, his son, Marquess Wen of Wei, became the Wei leader.

== See also ==
- Partition of Jin
