= Marquess Wen of Wei =

Ruler of Wei from 446 to 396 BC

Marquess Wen of Wei 魏文侯
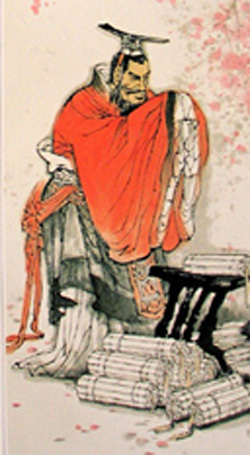

Marquess of Wei
- Tenure: 424 – 396 BC
- Predecessor: New title
- Successor: Marquess Wu
- Full name: Ancestral name: Jī (姬); Lineage name: Wèi (魏); Given name: Sī (斯) or Dōu/Dū (都)
- Died: 396 BC
- Noble family: Wei
- Issue: Marquess Wu; Lord Zhongshan (中山君)
- Father: Viscount Huan

Prime Minister of Jin
- In office 425 – 403 BC
- Preceded by: Zhao Wuxu

Chinese name
- Chinese: 魏文侯
Transcriptions
Standard Mandarin
- Hanyu Pinyin: Wèi Wén Hóu

Marquess Wen of Wei (died 396 BC), personal name Wei Si, was the founding marquess of the Wei state. He belonged to the Wei clan, one of the noble houses that dominated Jin politics in the 5th and 6th centuries BC.

He became the leader of the Wei clan in 445 BCE, succeeding his father Viscount Huan, and in 424 BCE adopted the title of "Marquess" (侯). In 403 BCE, King Weilie of Zhou acknowledged Wei Si as Marquess of Wei while conferring similar titles on the leaders of the Han and Zhao clans, thereby effectively splitting the Jin state into three and confirming the Partition of Jin.

Sima Qian praised Marquess Wen for his eagerness to learn. Marquess Wen is said to have often consulted the Confucian scholar Zixia as well as Tian Zifang (田子方) and Duangan Mu (段干木), among others. Marquess Wen also appointed Legalist philosopher Li Kui, whose principles for the implementation of political reforms were "to eat one must labor, to receive a salary one must provide meritorious service; those who do not will be punished." As the State of Wei underwent these reforms it became rich and powerful.

In turn, Marquess Wen defeated the Zhongshan state while General Wu Qi attacked and took five cities in what would become the Xihe Commandery within the borders of the Qin state (between the Yellow River and Luo River, spanning parts of modern-day Shaanxi and Shanxi). With Ximen Bao installed as magistrate of Ye (in modern-day Hebei), Beimen Ke (北門可) in control of Suanzao (酸棗) and Zhai Huang (翟黃) as Senior Minister, the Wei state underwent political reforms and constructed irrigation systems. As a result, Wei became the strongest vassal state during the early Warring States period.

== Life and career ==
In 446 BCE, the sixth year of the reign of Duke Ai of Jin, Wèi Huán-zǐ died and was succeeded by his son Wèi Sī who became Marquess Wen of Wei.

=== Honoring virtue and propriety ===
Marquess Wen knew full well that to bring peace and stability to the country he needed to appoint worthy and virtuous officials. He had heard that Confucian scholar Zixia enjoyed a wide reputation as a worthy individual and went in person to pay his respects to the master. Moved by Marquess Wen's sincerity, Zixia came to Xīhé in Wei. Thereafter the people of Wei benefited greatly from Zixia's training of students in Confucian statecraft such that people longed to come to Xīhé. One after another, many new students arrived to study under Zixia. As a result, Wei became a concentrated center of academic study possessing a multitude of talented people. There were many times when Marquess Wen respectfully consulted Zixia regarding the Confucian Classics and the Confucian arts of rites and music. The scholar was always patient and passed on to his ruler policies of benevolent government that cherished the people while providing an analysis of the differences between ancient and (at that time) modern music. He also used musical metaphors and advised Marquess Wen to personally follow the principles of the ancient sage emperors Yao and Shun by staying close to his virtuous officials, avoiding flatterers, and being prudent with regard to the requirements of the monarchy over his own self-interest.

=== Appointment of Li Kui ===
Marquess Wen appointed Li Kui as his ministerial assistant responsible for political reform. Li Kui advanced policies of "utmost fertility in education", implemented a fair grain buying law and established the tenets of "food requires labor, salary requires meritorious service," "usefulness will be rewarded" and "the monarchy has no patience with rebels." These became standard government methods in the State of Wei and made it a powerful country in the early Warring States period. The State of Wei's laws were later codified into the Canon of Laws.

Duke Wen's appointment of officials, including Li Kui (often considered by Chinese historians the first Legalist), Zhai Huang, Yue Yang, Wu Qi, and Ximen Bao, to advance changes in government that would later be considered Legalist, would arguably make Wei one of the first states to do so, and make Wen an important figure in the "Legalist" pantheon.

=== Wei becomes a hegemon ===
When war broke out between the states of Han and Zhao, the Han State sent a special ambassador to Wei to ask for military assistance. The envoy said: "We hope that your noble country can lend us troops to attack Zhao," whereupon Marquess Wen replied "As sovereign I will tell you that the Marquess of Zhao and I are like brothers, therefore I dare not lend you troops to attack his country." Subsequently, the Zhao state sent an envoy with an identical request for an attack against Han. Again Marquess Wen replied "As sovereign I will tell you that the Marquess of Han and I are like brothers, therefore I dare not lend you troops to attack his country." As a result, neither Han nor Zhao received military assistance from Wei, and both envoys returned angrily to their capitals. Not long afterwards, they discovered that Marquess Wen had already mediated in the dispute, and thereafter both Zhao and Han were made to pay separate tribute to Wei. Later, during the Song dynasty, Sima Guang remarked: "As a result, Wei became the strongest of the Jin vassal states with both Han and Zhao unable to match it militarily."

=== Seizure of Xihe ===
The military commander Wu Qi threw his support behind the State of Wei when he heard that Marquess Wen was a wise and able leader. Marquess Wen asked Li Kui for his opinion of Wú Qĭ and was told: "He avidly seeks fame and glory and is a womanizer, having said that, if you put him at the head of an attack force, even Sima Rangju would not be his equal." On hearing this Marquess Wen made Wú Qĭ a general in his army and asked him to lead his troops into the State of Qin and seize five cities. General Wú Qĭ subsequently occupied Qin territory to the east of the Luo River for the four years between 409 and 406 BCE thereby expanding the State of Wei along its western borders. Marquess Wen then established the Xihe Commandery consisting of the five captured cities.

=== Governing the city of Ye ===
Marquess Wen appointed Ximen Bao as magistrate of Ye but he did not want the post. The Marquess persuaded him to take the job by saying: "Worthy minister, you should not miss this opportunity; you can definitely achieve great things in politics and become famous throughout China!" Ximen Bao took up his post then immediately summoned a group of local elders to learn about the frequent disasters suffered as a result of the nearby Zhang River flooding. He was told that as a result of collusion between witches and local officials, every year a maiden had to be sacrificed to appease the river god Hebo on the occasion of his taking a wife to obviate floods. Ximen Bao dismissed the story as superstitious nonsense and said it was a ruse to cheat people out of their money and property. After outlawing the sinister practice of sacrifice to the river god, Ximen Bao mobilized manpower to cut twelve drainage canals to channel the waters of the Zhang River. Thereafter there were no more floods and instead of suffering damage from the river, the fields were irrigated by it.

=== Overthrow of Zhongshan ===
Marquess Wen wanted to take control of the State of Zhongshan but in order to attack, he needed access through the State of Zhao. The rulers of Zhao at first refused the Marquess’ request but when the Zhao Chancellor heard he said: "If Wei attack Zhongshan and they are defeated, they are bound to have lost a significant portion of their resources and will become a weak country. If on the other hand they annihilate Zhongshan, the new territory will be bisected by our country and it will be difficult for Wei to remain in control of it for any significant period." On hearing this the Zhao ruler Zhào Xiàn-zǐ (simplified Chinese: 赵献子; traditional Chinese: 趙獻子) agreed to allow the Wei army to pass through the Zhao State.

At this time, among Minister of War Zhai Huang's (Chinese: 翟璜) entourage there was an individual called Yue Yang (simplified Chinese: 乐羊; traditional Chinese: 樂羊) who advocated an immediate attack on Zhongshan. Even though his son had been killed in Zhongshan because of Yue Yang's son Yue Shu (simplified Chinese: 乐舒; traditional Chinese: 樂舒), Zhai Huang knew that Yue Yang was a talented field commander and gave the matter considerable thought. He then told Marquess Wen: "If my lord wishes to obtain the territory of Zhongshan then your minister recommends that Yue Yang leads the army." When the other civil and military ministers heard of this proposal they opposed it strongly, believing that Yue Yang would surrender but Zhai Huang guaranteed on his own and his family's lives that Yue Yang would not betray Wei. Marquess Wen visited Yue Yang then the two of them along with Wu Qi led an army to attack Zhongshan.

Yue Yang laid siege to the capital of Zhongshan for three years, during which time Duke Wu of Zhongshan captured Yue Yang's son Yue Shu, killed him then cooked the body and sent the minced remains to Yue Yang. Sitting under his tent, the general ate an entire bowl full. On seeing this Marquess Wen said: "Because of me General Yang has had to eat the flesh of his own son. If he can do that, whose body would he not eat?"

The state of Zhongshan was eliminated in 406 BCE, the twenty-fifth year of Marquis Wen's reign. When Yue Yang returned to Wei he couldn't help but develop a somewhat arrogant manner due to his achievements. When Marquis Wen found out he summoned the general to his palace and showed him some disparaging letters he had received. A tense Yue Yang kowtowed to his lord and said: "This is not to your minister's credit, it is to your credit". The Marquess rewarded Yue Yang by giving him Lingshou County (in modern-day Hebei Province) but never again used the general in an important position.

=== Creation of the three states ===
In 424 BCE, the tenth year of the reign of Duke You of Jin, Marquess Wen adopted his title on his own initiative and declared 424 BCE as the first year of his own reign. Nineteen years later in 405 BCE, during the reign of Duke Lie of Jin, an internal revolt broke out in the State of Qi around the town of Tianhui in Linqiu County (modern-day Juancheng County, Shandong Province). The rebels asked the three Jin vassals Wei, Zhao and Han for assistance so Marquess Wen appointed Zhai Jue to lead an allied army and attack the Great Wall of Qi. After capturing the Qi ruler, Duke Kang, the rulers of the three Jin vassals had an audience with the Zhou King whereupon Duke Kang requested the King to dub the Wei, Han and Zhao leaders Marquesses.

In 403 BCE, the thirteenth year of the reign of Duke Lie of Jin, the Nine Tripod Cauldrons were struck in the presence of the Zhou King who then formally acknowledged that the leaders of Han, Zhao and Wei were no longer vassals of Jin but rulers in their own right with the title of "Marquess". The event is often considered the beginning of the Warring States period.

== Death ==
Marquess Wen died in 396 BCE. On his deathbed he summoned Wu Qi, Ximen Bao and Běimén Kě among others and entrusted his son Prince of Wei to their care. After Marquess Wen died, his son Marquess Wu of Wei became ruler of Wei.

== Family ==
- Father: Wei Huan-zi
- Brother: Wei Cheng
- Sons:
  - Marquess Wu of Wei
  - Zhi, Lord of Zhongshan
- Daughter:
  - Princess Qing
