= Zhi Yao =

Prime minister of the Chinese state of Jin (died 453 BCE)

Viscount Xiang of Zhi 知襄子

Leader of Zhi clan
- Predecessor: Viscount Xuan of Zhi (知宣子)
- Successor: None
- Died: 453 BC
- Issue: Zhi Yan (知顏)
Names
- Ancestral name: Zǐ (子); Lineage name: Zhī (知) or Zhì (智) or Xún (荀); Given name: Yáo (瑤)
Posthumous name
- Viscount Xiang (襄子)
- House: Zi
- Father: Viscount Xuan (Zhi Shen)

Zhi Yao (Chinese: 知瑤 or 智瑤), also known as Xun Yao (Chinese: 荀瑤) or Yao, Count of Zhi (Chinese: 知伯瑤 or 智伯瑤), also known by his posthumous name as the Viscount Xiang of Zhi, was the last leader of the Zhi clan in the Jin state. He was the son of Zhi Shen (Viscount Xuan). He was the last zhongjunjiang of Jin before the state's partition.

Zhi Yao's dramatic death was a significant event in Chinese history. As the ruler of the dominant vassal state, he asked Viscount Kang of Han (韓康子), Viscount Huan of Wei, and Viscount Xiang of Zhao to cede their lands to the Zhi clan. Han and Wei complied, but Zhao refused to do so. In response to Zhao's refusal, Zhi Yao led his army, along with armies from Han and Wei, in laying siege to the Zhao capital Jinyang (modern-day Taiyuan). The siege lasted two years before it came to a dramatic end. Zhao conspired with the Han and Wei rulers so that Zhi Yao was betrayed by his own allies and defeated. Zhao decapitated Zhi Yao and massacred his entire family of over 200 members. After the fall of the Zhi clan, no vassals in Jin could once again match the power of the Zhao, Han, and Wei clans. The Duke of Jin was consequently only a figurehead with no real political power. This eventually led to the Partition of Jin and the establishment of Han, Zhao and Wei as independent vassal states formally acknowledged by the Eastern Zhou dynasty. The Partition of Jin marks the end of the Spring and Autumn period and the beginning of the Warring States period of Chinese history.

== Ascendance ==
When choosing Xiangzi as his successor, Xuanzi of Zhi was warned by his clansman Zhi Guo who believed that Xiangzi's personality did not fit the qualities of a ruler. However, Xuanzi dismissed Guo's opinion.

In 472 BC, the third year of Duke Chu of Jin's rule, Xiangzi led his army in an invasion of the state of Qi. He managed to defeat Qi's troops in the battle of Liqiu. Zuo Qiuming recorded this battle in his work Zuo Zhuan. In the Zuo Zhuan, it is said that Xiangzi of Zhi resented the oracles of I Ching because Zhi believed in his own power. In 468 BC, Xiangzi of Zhi invaded the state of Zheng. Zheng's retainer Sihong then asked Qi for reinforcements. With the intervention of Qi, Zhi had to abandon his plan of invading Zheng. In 464 BC, Zhi once more entered Zheng's realm with troops from the Zhi and Zhao clans. Sihong organised resistance against them.

In 458 BC, Zhi united the armies of Han, Zhao and Wei. He attacked and exterminated two of the major clans of Jin: the Fan and the Zhonghang. Zhi took most of the Fan and Zhonghang fiefs with the result that he rose in influence to the top of Jin's court. The Zhao clan, which had been in control of the Jin court before Zhi's sudden rise, was pushed out. At a subsequent banquet, Xiangzi of Zhi and Xiangzi of Zhao met. According to Han dynasty scholar Liu An, Zhi slapped Zhao's head. This insult offended Zhao's retainers deeply but also strengthened Zhao's resolve to deal with Zhi.

Xiangzi then conquered the vassal state, Qiuyou of Zhongshan. In 457 BC, he claimed lands from the Han, Wei and Zhao clans. Unexpectedly, Xiangzi of Zhao defiantly refused Zhi's request. Xiangzi of Zhi was enraged by Zhao's response to him. He led his troops in a march into Zhao's territory with the help of troops from the Han and Wei clans. Xiangzi of Zhao, upon seeing this strong army approach, decided to retreat to Jinyang.

== Fall of the Zhi clan ==
In 453 BC, Xiangzi of Zhi organised the diversion of the Fen River to flow into Jinyang where Zhao was based. As a consequence, Zhao's capital was flooded and its army and people starved.

Xiangzi of Zhi was pleased with the situation facing Zhao. He told Kangzi of Han and Huanzi of Wei that "At first, I did not know water can exterminate a nation, now I know." Kangzi and Huanzi were concerned by Xiangzi's words because they saw themselves facing a similar situation to Zhao's predicament one day.

In the meantime, Zhao sent his strategist, Zhang Mengtan, to seek to influence the Han and Wei clans. Mengtan identified the concerns that the Han and Wei rulers had: Zhi would eventually turn against Han and Wei once Zhao was destroyed.

Later in the year, Zhao's army destroyed the dam which controlled the water diversion. Han and Wei then betrayed Zhi and surrounded the Zhi army. Xiangzi of Zhao led the attack on Zhi. Xiangzi of Zhi was captured and decapitated. His skull was used as Zhao's wine cup as a symbol of the glorious victory. Every member of the Zhi clan was killed by Zhao. The battle marked the end of the Zhi clan and the beginning of the Partition of Jin.

Chinese royalty
Preceded by Zhi Shen (知申)	House of Zhi	House of Zhi destroyed
Political offices
Preceded by Zhao Yang (趙鞅)	Zhongjunjiang of Jin; 475 BC – 453 BC	Succeeded by Zhao Wuxu
