= Warring States period =

Period of Chinese history, c. 475 – 221 BC

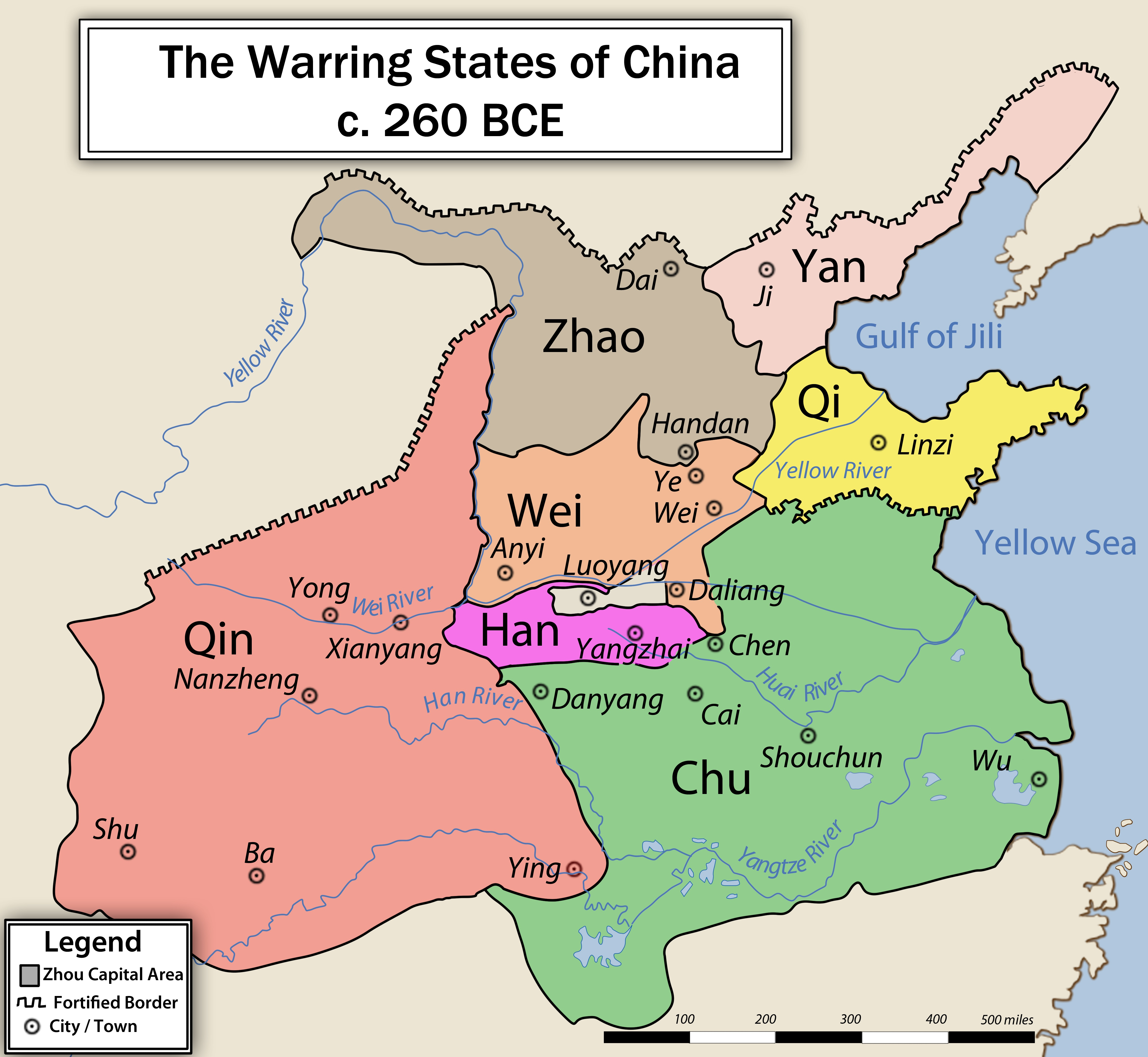
- The seven Warring States of Yan, Zhao, Han, Wei, Qi, Chu, Qin c. 260 BC
- Traditional Chinese: 戰國時代
- Simplified Chinese: 战国时代
- Hanyu Pinyin: Zhànguó shídài
Transcriptions
Standard Mandarin
- Hanyu Pinyin: Zhànguó shídài
- Bopomofo: ㄓㄢˋ ㄍㄨㄛˊ ㄕˊ ㄉㄞˋ
- Wade–Giles: Chan^{4}-kuo^{2} Shih^{2}-tai^{4}
- Tongyong Pinyin: Jhànguó shíhdài
- Yale Romanization: Jàn'gwó shŕdài
- IPA: [ʈʂân.kwǒ ʂɻ̩̌.tâɪ]
Yue: Cantonese
- Yale Romanization: Jin'gwok sìhdoih
- Jyutping: Zin3 gwok3 si4 doi6
- IPA: [tsin˧.kʷɔk̚˧ si˩.tɔj˨]
Southern Min
- Hokkien POJ: Chiàn-kok sî-tāi
- Tâi-lô: Tsiàn-kok sî-tāi
Old Chinese
- Baxter–Sagart (2014): *tar-s [C.q]ʷˤək; tar-s [d]ə (~ [d]əʔ) lˤək-s

The Warring States period (c. 475 – 130 BC) (Note: The popular view amongst scholars is that the Warring States period began in 475 BC, (the end of the Spring and Autumn period.) Other sources, however, list 453 BC (the partition of Jin) or even 481 BC (when the Lu chronicles end.) in Chinese history comprises the final centuries of the Zhou dynasty (c. 1046 – 256 BC), which were characterized by warfare, bureaucratic and military reform, and political consolidation. It followed the Spring and Autumn period and concluded with the wars of conquest that saw the state of Qin annex each of the other contender states by 221 BC and found the Qin dynasty, the first imperial dynastic state in East Asian history. It saw developments in philosophy, commerce, agriculture, the arts, and society at large.

While scholars have identified several different dates as marking the beginning of the Warring States period, Sima Qian's choice of 475 BC is the most often cited. The era largely corresponds to the second half of the Eastern Zhou period, when the king of Zhou formally ruled as Chinese sovereign, but had lost political power and functioned in practice as a figurehead. This dynamic served as the backdrop for the machinations of the eponymous Warring States. The term "Warring States period" comes from the Record of the Warring States, a work of history compiled during the early Han dynasty (202 BC – 220 AD). It was also named such because of how the scale of warfare exploded during this period.

== Geography ==
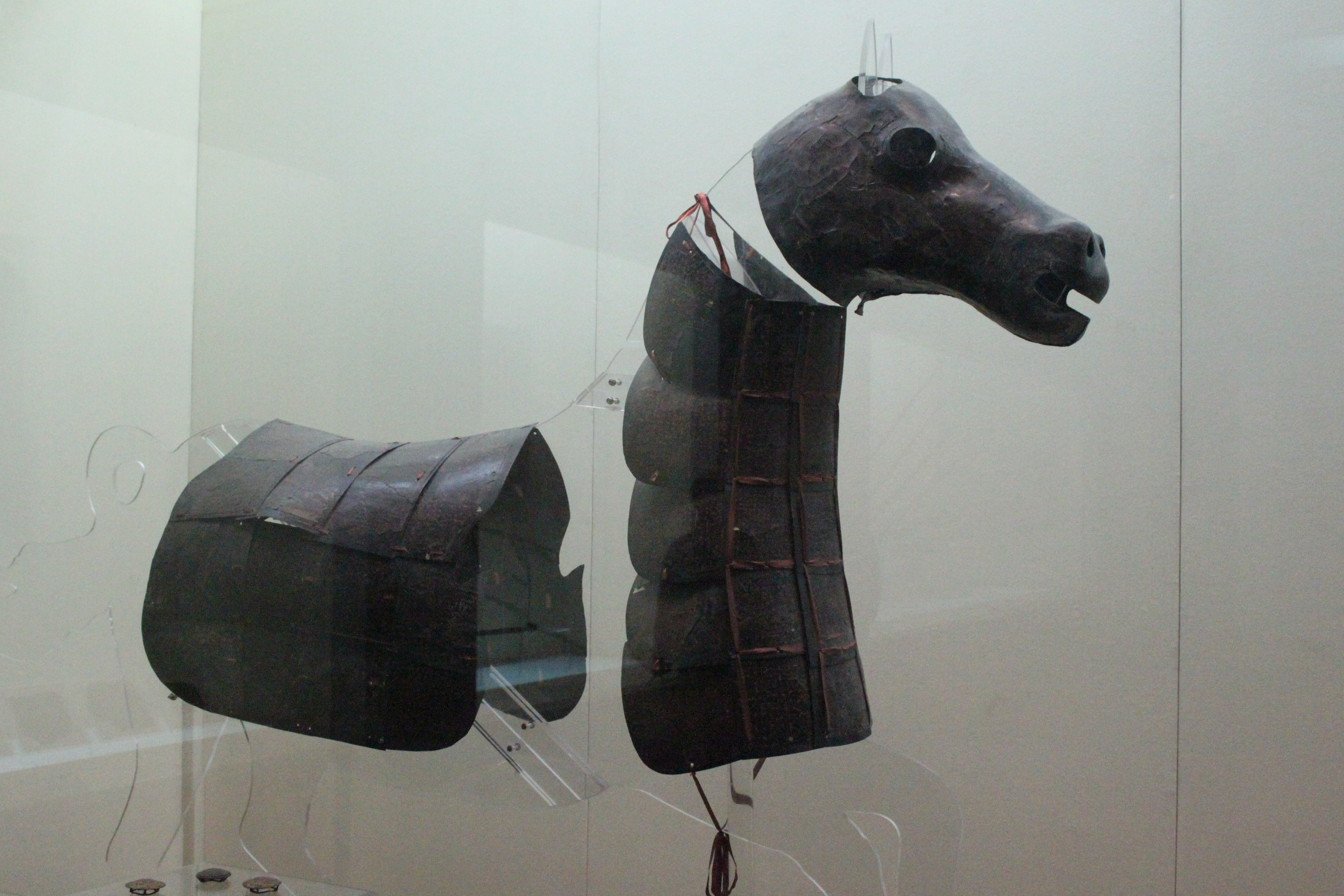
Leather horse armour from the tomb of Marquis Yi of Zeng c. 433 BC

In 450 BC there existed eight large states: Yan in the north and Yue in the east, though these two did not play any decisive role in the Warring States period that went on almost without end for the next 225 years. The "Big Six" were Qi, Chu, Qin, and the "Three Jins," being Wei, Han and Zhao. There were also plenty of smaller principalities, all of which would become part of the larger states.

In the beginning of the Warring States period, however, there were seven powerful states: Qin in the west, Qi in the east, Chu in the south, Yan in the north, and the "Three Jins" of Wei, Han, and Zhao, located in the central region, with Han in the south, Wei in the middle, and Zhao in the north.

== History ==
=== Background and formation ===
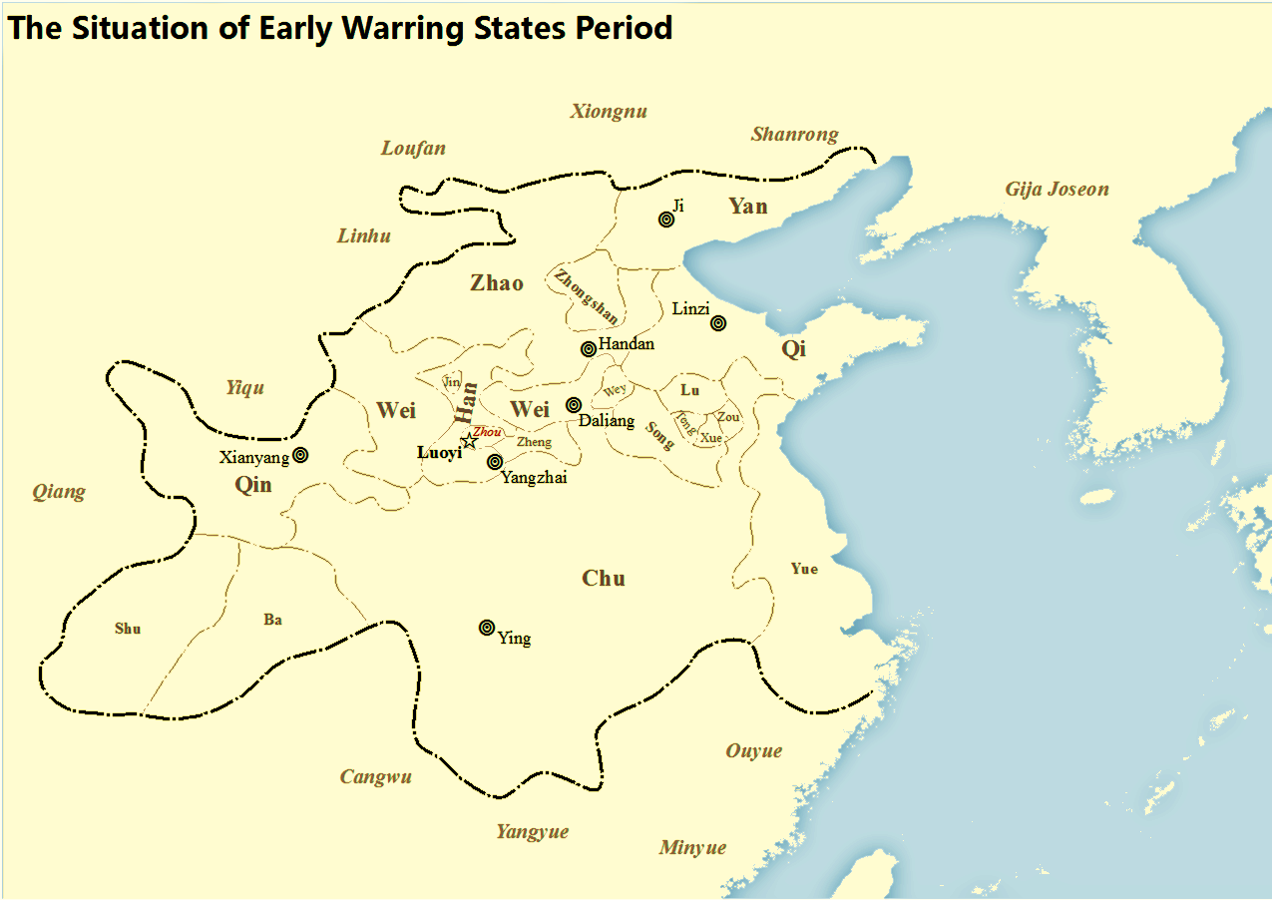
Map showing states at the beginning of the Warring States period

The Eastern Zhou dynasty began its fall around the 5th century BC. As their influence waned, they had to rely on armies in allied states rather than their own military force. Hundreds of smaller polities coalesced into seven major states which included Chu, Han, Qin, Wei, Yan, Qi and Zhao. However, there eventually was a shift in alliances because each state's ruler wanted independence. This caused hundreds of wars between 535 and 286 BC. The victorious state would have overall rule and control in China.

The system of feudal states created by the Western Zhou dynasty underwent enormous changes after 771 BC with the flight of the Zhou court to modern-day Luoyang and the diminution of its relevance and power. The Spring and Autumn period led to a few states gaining power at the expense of many others, the latter no longer able to depend on central authority for legitimacy or protection. During the Warring States period, many rulers claimed the Mandate of Heaven to justify their conquest of other states and spread their influence.

The decline of the Zhou house began with the transfer of the capital from Shensi to the east in 770 BC. Nearly 150 years later, though, it would become weak, as seen in the formula used by the King to invest Duke Wen of Jin as Lord Protector (Pa):

Oh, my Uncle! Illustrious were the Kings Wen and Wu; they knew how to take care of their shining virtue, which rose with splendor on High (toward Heaven) and whose renown spread wide on earth. This is why the Sovereign of On-High made the Mandate succeed in the case of the Kinds Wen and Wu. Have pity on me! Cause me to continue (the line of my ancestors); Me, the Unique Man and cause (me and my line) to be perpetually on the throne!

==== Partition of Jin (453–403 BC) ====
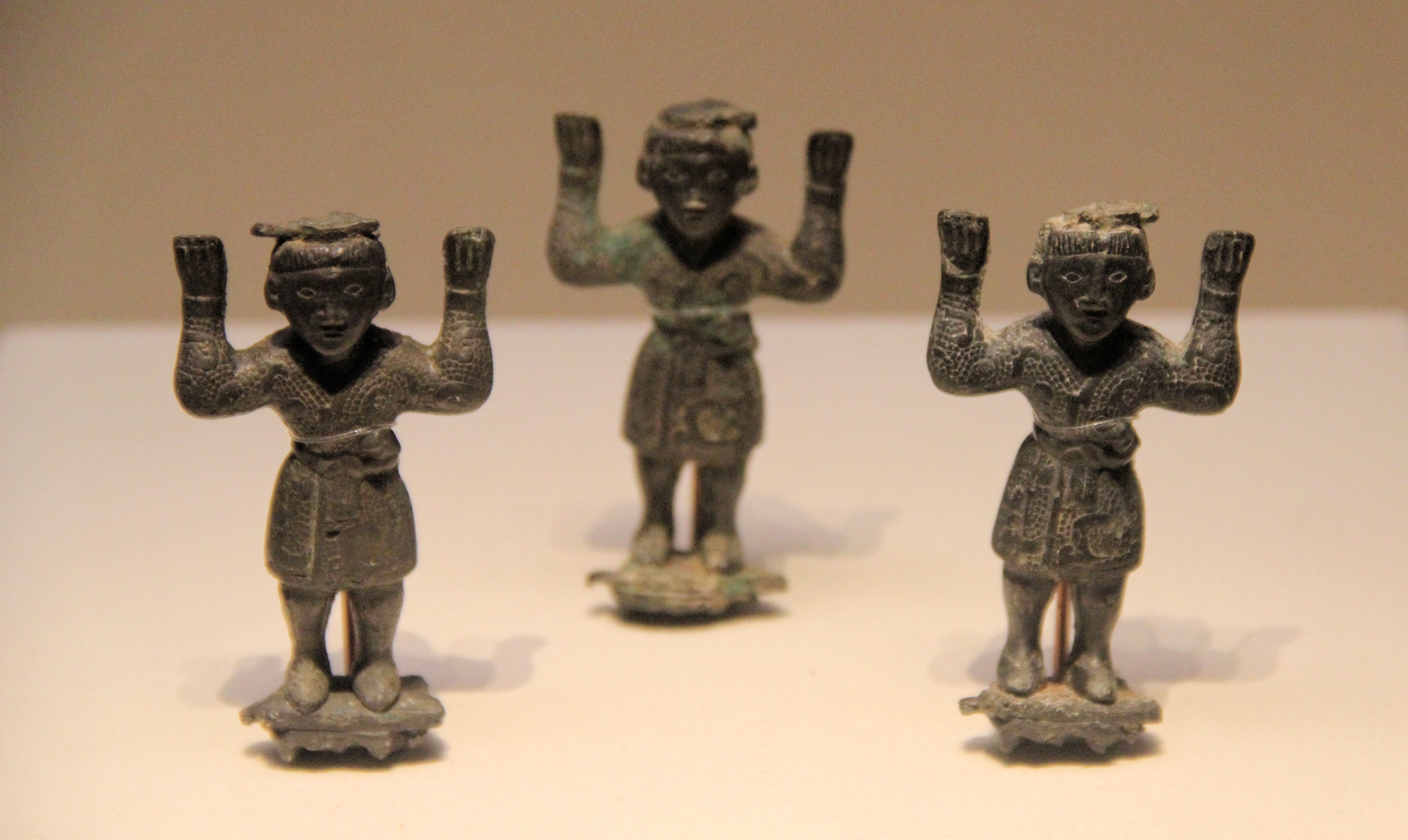
Warring States bronze warriors.

By 453, Jin, one of the most powerful states of the Spring and Autumn period was undergoing a civil war between its four ruling families; the Han, Wei, Zhao and Zhi clans. The Zhi clan, led by Zhi Yao was the most powerful and influential of the four and demanded land from all three clans as a show of submission. Only the Zhao clan refused and was besieged by the other three at Jinyang (modern-day Taiyuan). Zhao, however, was aware that the other two clans were only coerced into joining and convinced them to betray Zhi by flooding his camp. Zhi Yao and his family were exterminated, and his skull was presented to Zhao Wuxu, who used it as a drinking cup. This is marked as the beginning of the Warring States period.

Around this time there existed a Son of Heaven; a member of the Zhou house, whose authority other than the borders of the minuscule enclave by the rulers of the great states was practically non-existent. For centuries the kings of Zhou were no more than symbolic figures who maintained the calendar and performed periodic ritual sacrifices, upon which the relationship of Heaven, Earth, and Man stood.

=== Early Warring States ===
==== The Three Jins recognized (403–376 BC) ====
In 403 BC, the court of King Weilie of Zhou officially recognized the viscounts (zi 子) of Zhao, Wei and Han as marquises, (hou 侯) after they conquered Jin. In 376 BC, the states of Han, Wei and Zhao deposed Duke Jing of Jin and divided the last remaining Jin territory between themselves, marking the end of the Jin state.

==== Qi usurpation under Tian (391–386 BC) ====
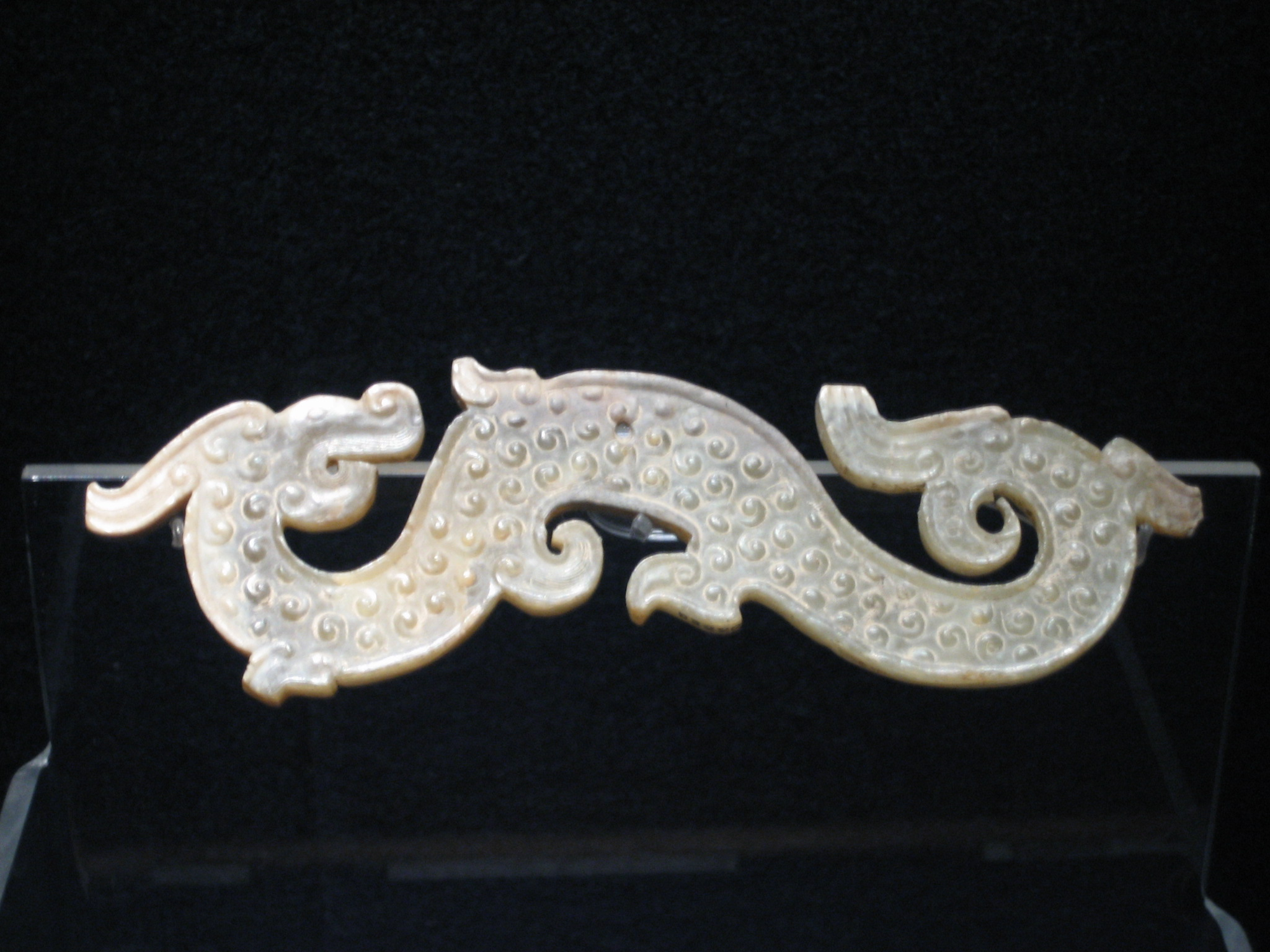
A carved-jade dragon garment ornament from the Warring States period

Qin, Qi, and Chu states would all greatly benefit from the fall of Jin, with Qi undergoing the most change, and controlled the Zhou cultural sphere, though Qi would eventually falter.

The Tian family, who were invaluable to the Qi rulers, would achieve complete dominance over the political sphere by usurping power and title. Tian then divided half of Qi as a puppet state, exiling the current ruler to a rural town, and the other half for their own complete control. When the Qi ruler died with no successor, the Tians would be recognized by the Zhou and delegate power over the state to Grand Duke Wang, though the Zhou would only do this to avoid getting overpowered by other states.

==== Politics of Wei (369-335 BC) ====
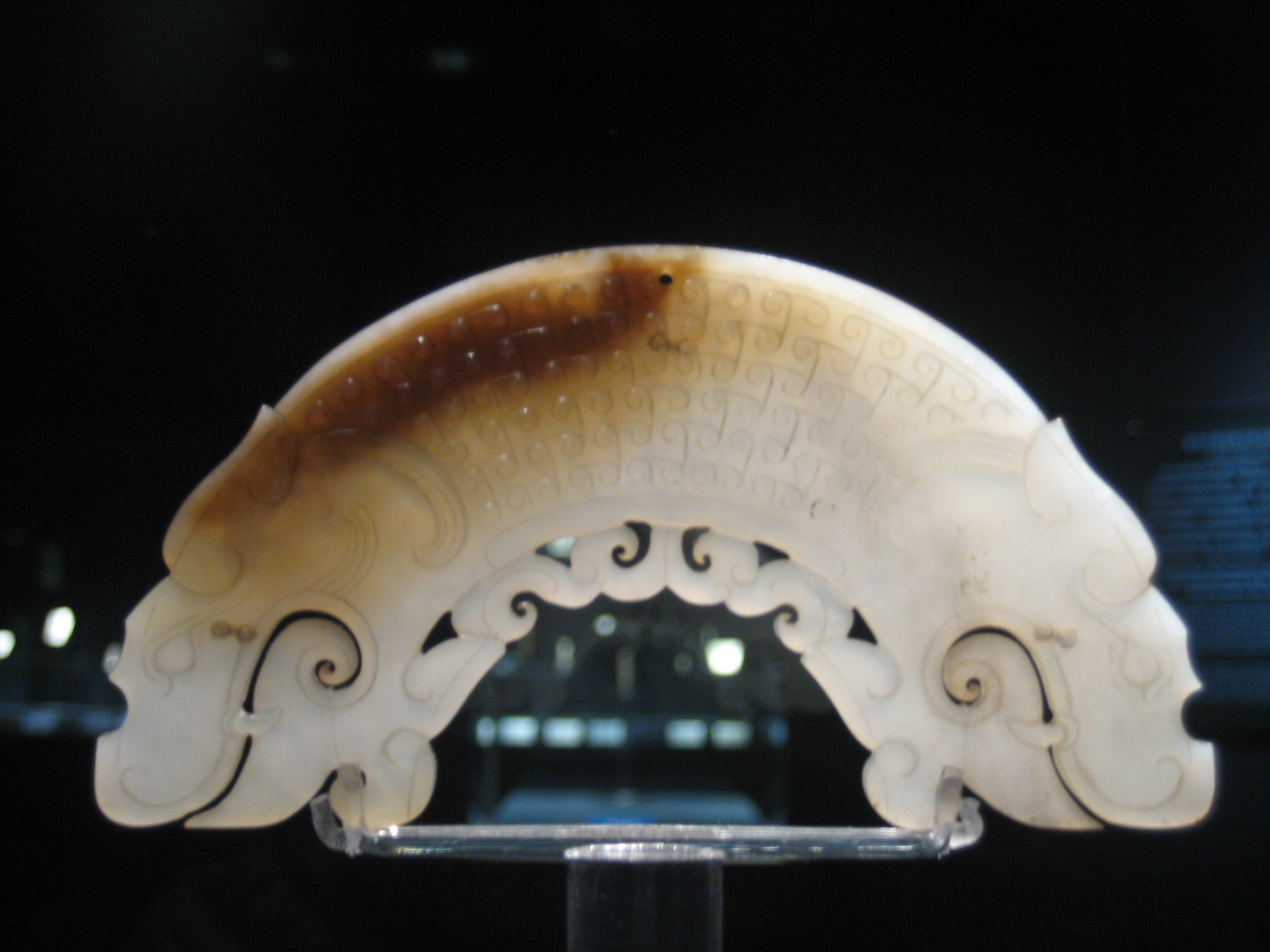
A jade-carved huang with two dragon heads, Warring States, Shanghai Museum

In 369 BC, Marquess Wen of Wei would ascend the throne of Wei and become the leader of the Wei family. With the help of the Three Qins, they besieged the Qi territory (located in modern-day Pingyuan County, Shandong.) Marquess Wen of Wei would also lead the Three Jins against the Chu state in response to their routine occupations. In 400 BC, Chu would be defeated. Marquess Wen would lead Wei to become the mightiest state in China, with even one of Confucius' old students, named Bu Shang, became Wei's court tutor and numerous strategists at their disposal.

King Hui of Wei ascended the throne of Wei one year later in 370 BC. Thanks to his predecessors and a great geographical position, King Hui of Wei was able to have several states enter an alliance under King Hui's supervision. However, due to the excellent position Wei was in (similar to Jin before its partition) King Hui frequently was limited by the other states in what he was able to accomplish. Later, in 340 BC, Qi would attack Wei, and Wei would only survive because Chu came to its assistance. Finally, in 335 BC, King Hui would resolve and end the conflict with the Qi ruler. The two met and both took the title of "King," (wang, 王, until this, Hui had previously the title of a marquess (hou, 侯) presumably ending the conflict between the two.

==== Shang Yang reforms Qin (358–338 BC) ====
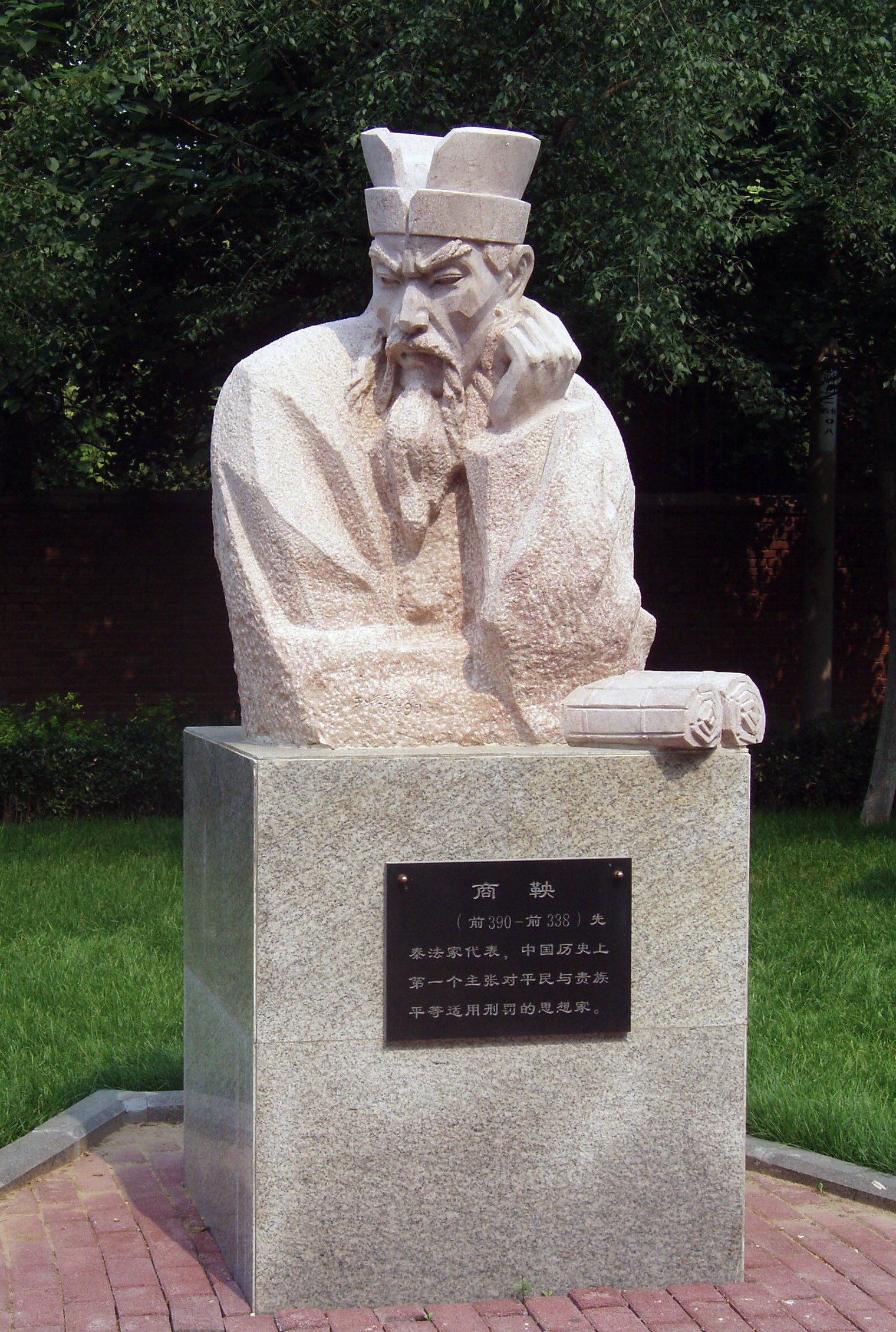
Statue of Shang Yang in China

Shang Yang worked for Prime Minister Gongshy Zuo. After being rejected as a successor to the duke of Wey, Shang Yang decided to offer his services outside of Wey. Later, Duke Xiao of Qin began calling for talented men to serve him, which captured Shang Yang's attention, in hopes for money and status. When he presented his ideas, court officials objected to them, labeling them as radical, but Duke Xiao would be swayed by his plans and made Shang Yang Prime Minister. He would remain in power for 20 years.

Once one of the most backward states, Shang Yang made major reforms to Qin, including new taxation systems, government management of the economy, standardization of measures and weights, promotion of the nuclear family and, as many writers emphasized, a harsh legal code. One could be cut in two if they harbored a fugitive, and severe punishments were delivered for relatively minor crimes. Shang Yang would also divide the lands of Qin into counties, which was determined according to the duke's court ruler. He delegated magistrates to rule over these counties, and since these magistrates had no political loyalty, Shang Yang was able to create the first true state-wide bureaucracy in China. He also began an official census, which would help in delivering punishment to the entire family, another aspect of legalistic Chinese philosophy. Rewards for good behavior were also given, though the punishments left a more lasting mark than rewards did. One even had the potential for one to attain patrician status, which upset the patricians, who were held up by their ancient status. Shang Yang would fall from power when he was declared an outlaw by the government and would be killed by the Qin armies in 338 BC.

==== Qin's further aggression & response (338–320 BC) ====
After Wei and Qi resolved their conflict, Qin began to expand extensively. They defeated several nomadic tribes to their north and had begun to take fertile land in their southwest, (modern-day upper Yangzi river) to which Chu was unable to deal with as they were already taking the fallen lands of Wu and Yue, and had no choice but to let Qin take their land, improving Qin's geographical position. In 325 BC, in a display of independence, Huiwen of Qin would symbolically declare himself king of Qin, no longer under any state's rule. In response, all other states except Chu (who had already declared royalty centuries before) also adopted the title of king (wang, 王), which caused the title to lose its superiority, though the Zhou still held the title as Sons of Heaven.

=== Horizontal and vertical alliances (320–256 BC) ===
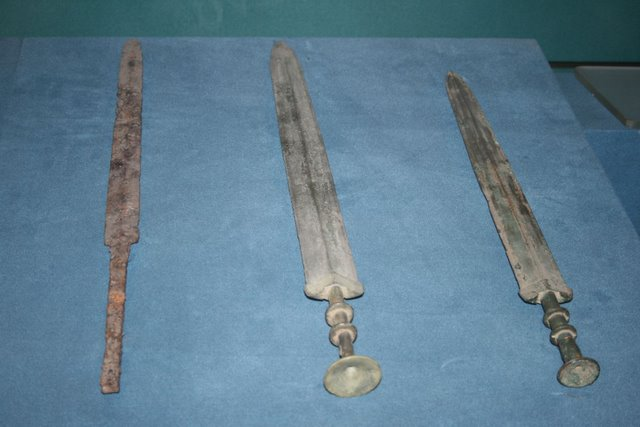
An iron sword and two bronze swords dated to the Warring States period

Qin became disproportionately powerful compared with the other six states. As a result, the policies of many states became overwhelmingly oriented towards dealing with the Qin threat, forming the "Vertical Alliances" (hézòng, 合纵), led by Su Qin in an attempt to stop Qin from advancing. To counter this and continue expansion, Qin would force many of its surrounding states to join the "Horizontal Alliances" (liánhéng, 連橫) led by Zhang Yi. The actions of these alliances are found in the Zhan Guo Ce.

==== First vertical alliance ====
In 321 BC, the king of Qi grew concerned over the rise in Qin's power. He would send Lord Mengchang as an emissary to Chu to form an alliance against Qin, which was accepted. Later, in 319 BC, King Hui of Wei died and his successor demanded Qin to leave the protectorate it was establishing. Acting on behalf of Wei, Qi and Chu attacked Qin, with the assistance of the Han, Zhao, and Yan, in 318 BC, though disputes over who would lead the campaign would end shortly after a failed attack at the Hangu Pass, which would allow Qin to take even more land. Ten years later, the same states attempted to recreate the alliance against Qin, but it failed after Qin bribed Chu to influence Qi and discourage the alliance, which then disbanded. The plot was so successful that in 302 BC, the states of Qin, Qi, and Chu would form an alliance, and Long Mengchang was appointed as a minister of Qin. Further political disruption continued as "the cycle of abortive alliances continued." Later, this allowed Qin to invade Zhou and end their line of monarchs in 256 BC.

==== Decimation of Qi ====
In 319 BC, King Xuan of Qi ascended the throne of Qi. After noticing the opportunity to seize power from the neighboring state of Yan, he began planning to take control of Yan. He placed Mencius, the most notable adherent of Confucianism in a high power in his government in order to have him give the green light to attack Yan, which was granted, though none of the requirements in order for Yan's ruler to be changed per the Mandate of Heaven were met. Despite this, Qi sent troops to attack Yan, which was a staggering success, with the people of Yan welcoming the new heir to the throne placed by Qi, which would act as a puppet state. Eventually, King Xuan withdrew his soldiers from Yan. After the death of King Xuan in 284 BC, an alliance of states lead under the guidance the Zhao began to attack Qi and assassinated the king, and began to loot and pillage Qi. Yan would hold control over Qi until 279 BC, whereupon the state of Qi would be restored and military forces would be withdrawn, thought Qi was severely stunted by this.

=== Qin unites China (230–221 BC) ===
Animated map of the Warring States period

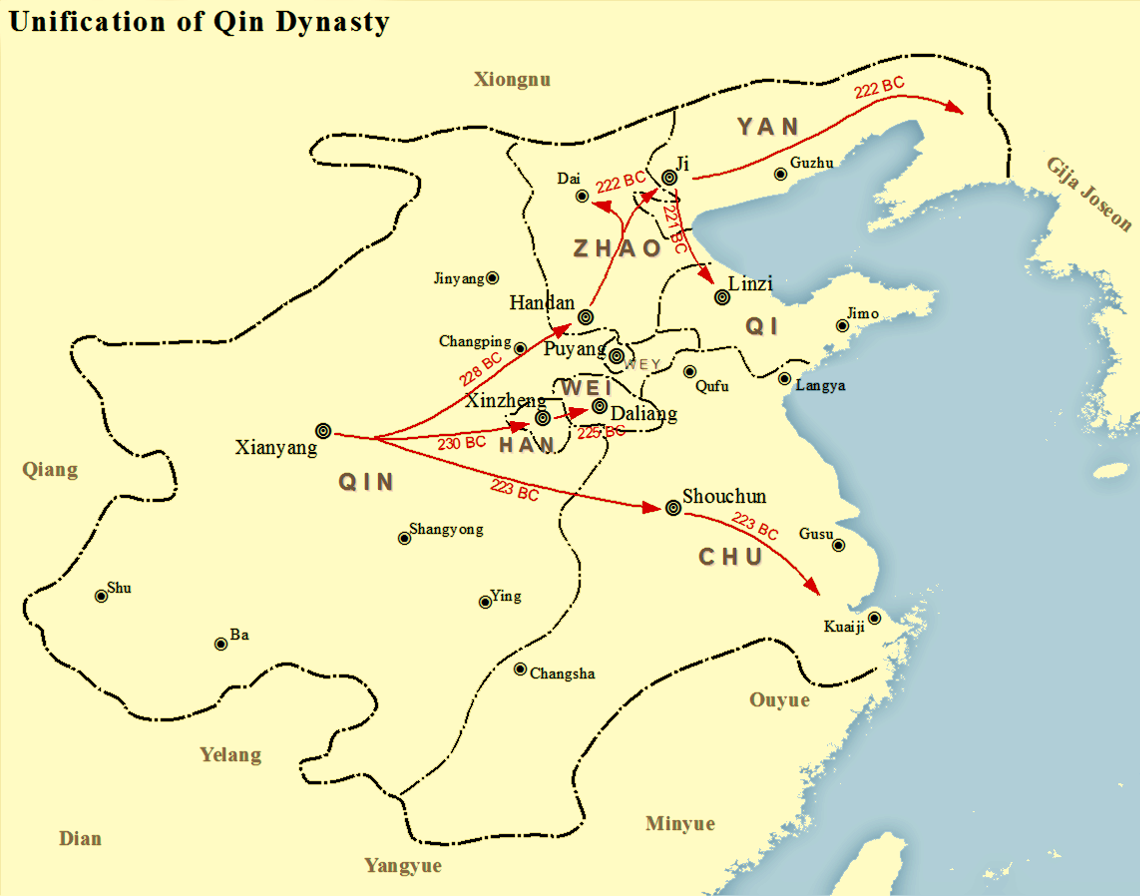
Unification of Qin from 230 BC to 221 BC

King Zhuangxiang of Qin ruled for only three years. He was succeeded by his son Zheng, who unlike the two elderly kings that preceded him was only 13 years old at his coronation. As an adult, Zheng became a brilliant commander who, in the span of just ten years, as seen below, unified China. Though not mentioned here, Qin would later, in the 4th century, subjugate almost all western territories (modern day Gansu province and the greater Lanzhou area.)

==== Conquest of Han ====
In 230 BC, Qin ordered Neishi Teng to conquer Han. The general Meng Ao would capture thirteen cities, with the final nail in the coffin being the establishment of a prefecture in Yinchuan.

==== Conquest of Zhao and Yan ====
In 230 BC, Qin saw an opportunity to conquer Zhao as they were experiencing a drought. Qin sent three generals. Wang Jian started in Shangdang Commandery and moved through the Taihang Mountains to attack Jingxing (modern-day Jingxing County). Yang Duanhe, laid siege to Handan, and Li Xin attacked and took control of Taiyuan and the Yunzhong Commandery. Zhao generals Li Mu and Sima Shang fought fiercely against Qin, which hindered their progress. In response, Qin sent an operative to bribe Guo Kai, King Youmiao's "principal favorite" minister. Guo Kai presumably took the bribe and accused the two generals of siding with Qin. They were replaced with Zhao Cong and Ju Xin. Li Mu, however, refused to transfer authority because he thought the two generals were not skilled enough to fight Qin. This aroused suspicion, so King Youmiao secretly sent men to kill Li Mu. Qin would then conquer Zhao three months later in 228 BC, killing Zhao Cong and capturing King Youmiao alive, and then establish the prefecture of Handan, which had control over all other nearby areas.

The armies of Qin then assembled on the Ji River banks and prepared an invasion of Yan. (Note: Pines 2021 says that Zhao was conquered first, then Wei, then Yan. However, Eno 2010 and Hu 2015 state it was Zhao, Yan, and then Wei. Here the latter was chosen.) The prince of Yan, Crown Prince Dan knew he could not defeat Qin, so he sought Jing Ke, an assassin, for help in kidnapping the Qin king, Qin Shi Huang, and persuade him to retreat his armies. Jing Ke agreed and attempted to kidnap him, but failed and died. Qin Shi Huang was furious at Crown Prince Dan and sent even more soldiers against Yan. Led by Wang Jian and Xin Sheng, Qin successfully defeated the enemy forces. Later, in 226 BC, both generals conquered the Yan capital, Jicheng, forcing the Yan king, Xi of Yan, to flee to Liaoning, who was able to survive by giving Crown Prince Dan's severed head.

==== Conquest of Wei ====
In 225 BC, Wang Ben, (Wang Jian's son) was sent to conquer Wei. They would flood the Daliang Mountains, forcing Jia of Wei to surrender. Meng Ao would attack Zhang Yi and Guiguzi. A few years later both generals would be captured. Meng Ao would go on to capture twenty cities including Changping and Yongqiu (now modern-day Qi County, Kaifeng.)

==== Conquest of Chu ====
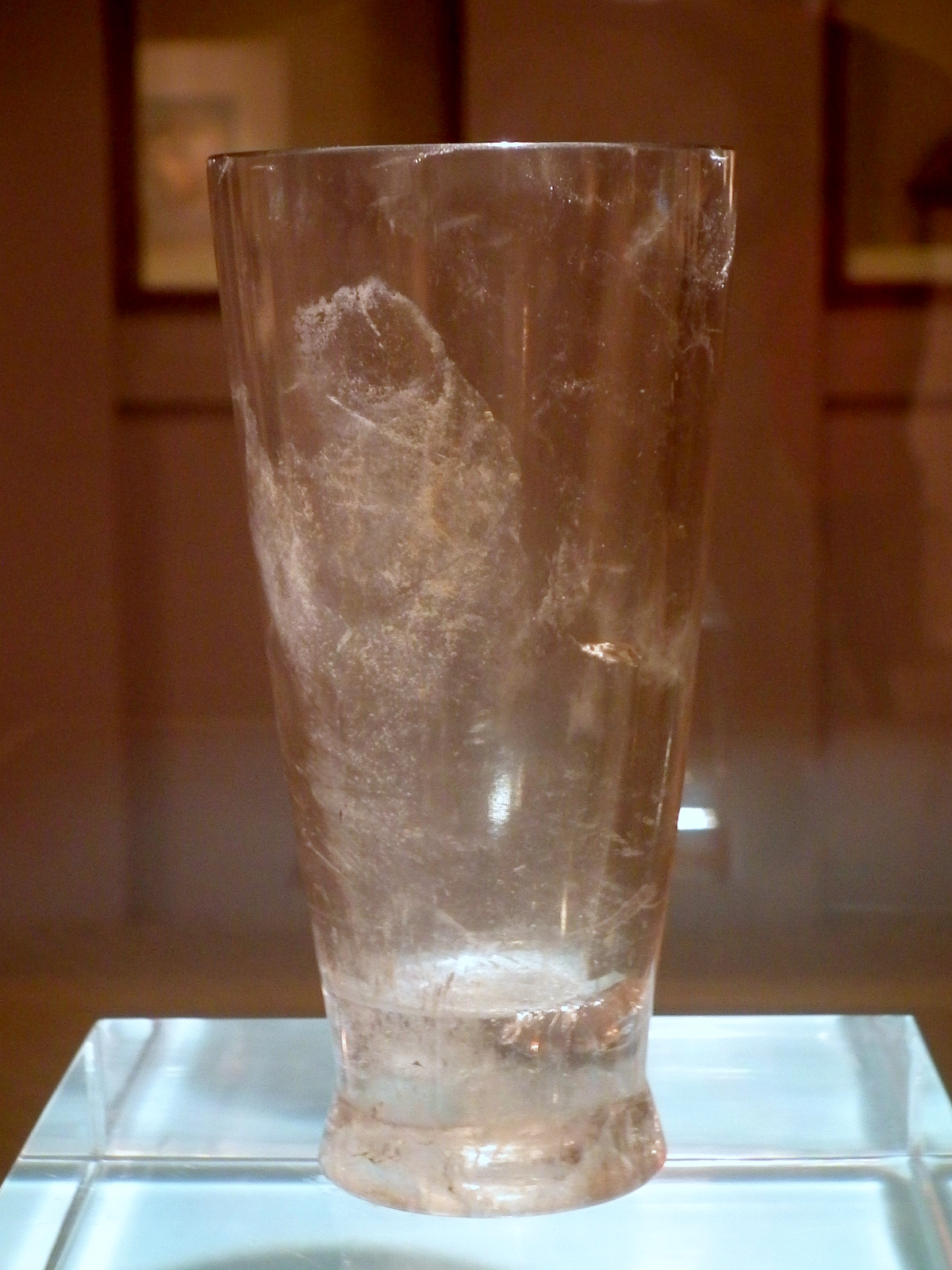
A drinking cup carved from crystal, unearthed at Banshan, Hangzhou, Warring States period, Hangzhou Museum

In 225 BC, Qin prepared to invade Chu. After receiving 400,000 soldiers, one-half led by Meng Wu towards modern-day Pingyu County and another half led by Li Xin, towards modern-day Shenqiu County. The Qin forces took both cities and met in Chengdu to begin another conquest. However, a revolution and hostage situation in modern-day Jiangling County forced Li Xin to quell the rebellion, leading to heavy casualties for Li Xin's army.

In 222 BC, Wang Jian was recalled to lead a second military invasion with 600,000 men against the rebels in Chu state. High in morale after their victory in the previous year, the Chu forces were content to sit back and defend against what they expected to be a siege of Chu. However, Wang Jian decided to weaken Chu's resolve and tricked the Chu army by appearing to be idle in his fortifications whilst secretly training his troops to fight in Chu territory. After a year, the Chu defenders decided to disband due to apparent lack of action from the Qin. Wang Jian invaded at that point, with full force, and overran Huaiyang and the remaining Chu forces. Chu lost the initiative and could only sustain local guerrilla-style resistance until it too was fully conquered with the destruction of Shouchun and the death of its last leader, Lord Changping, in 223 BC. At their peak, the combined armies of Chu and Qin are estimated to have ranged from hundreds of thousands to a million soldiers, more than those involved in the campaign of Changping between Qin and Zhao 35 years earlier.

In the rule of the Qin state, the union was based solely on military power. The feudal holdings were abolished, and noble families were forced to live in the capital city Xianyang, in order to be supervised. A national road (as well as greater use of canals) allowed for faster and easier deployment and supply of the army. The peasants were given a wider range of land rights, although they were subject to taxation, creating a large amount of revenue to the state.

==== Conquest of Qi ====
Qi Prime Minister Hou Sheng was bribed to influence King Jian of Qi to have a pacifist view towards Qin, so when the Qin attacked other states, the king send no aid. Wang Ben was easily able to conquer Qi due to its lack of military strength, and divided Qi into 2 prefectures. After successfully unifying all of China, Qin Shi Huang would claim the title of emperor, marking the end of the Warring States period, in 221 BC.

== Military theory and practice ==
The Warring States period required solutions to issues relating to politics and war. During this time, there existed hundreds of scholarly individuals who would wander from state to state, eager to peddle ideas to rulers "anxious over the perilous condition of their countries and the weakness of their armies." These rulers would compete these scholars for advice over how to manage their armies, which would shock kings, dukes, and others. This, however, was a dangerous profession; if the advice given worked, they would be rewarded with high positions, but if the advice given failed, they would be tortured to death via being sawed in half, minced, or torn apart by chariots. Rewards were offered to devote men to giving their talent towards government, diplomacy, and military affairs. (Note: Griffith cites The Book of Lord Shang, (p. 95) but this seems to be a failed verification.) These wanderers were not bound by patriotism or loyalty. In fact, they would often served two princes and would be, "playing off the policy of the one against the other."

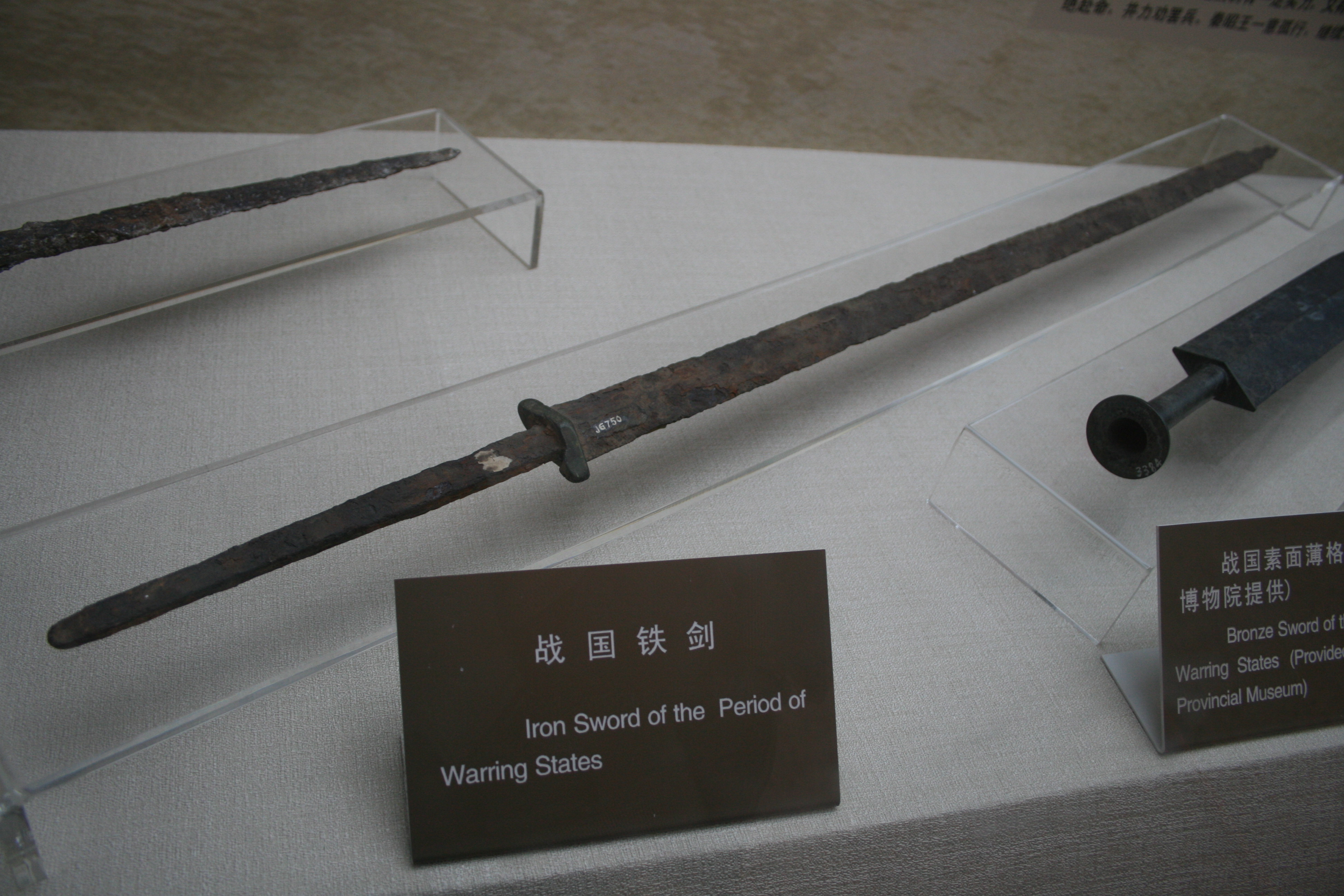
An iron sword of the Warring States

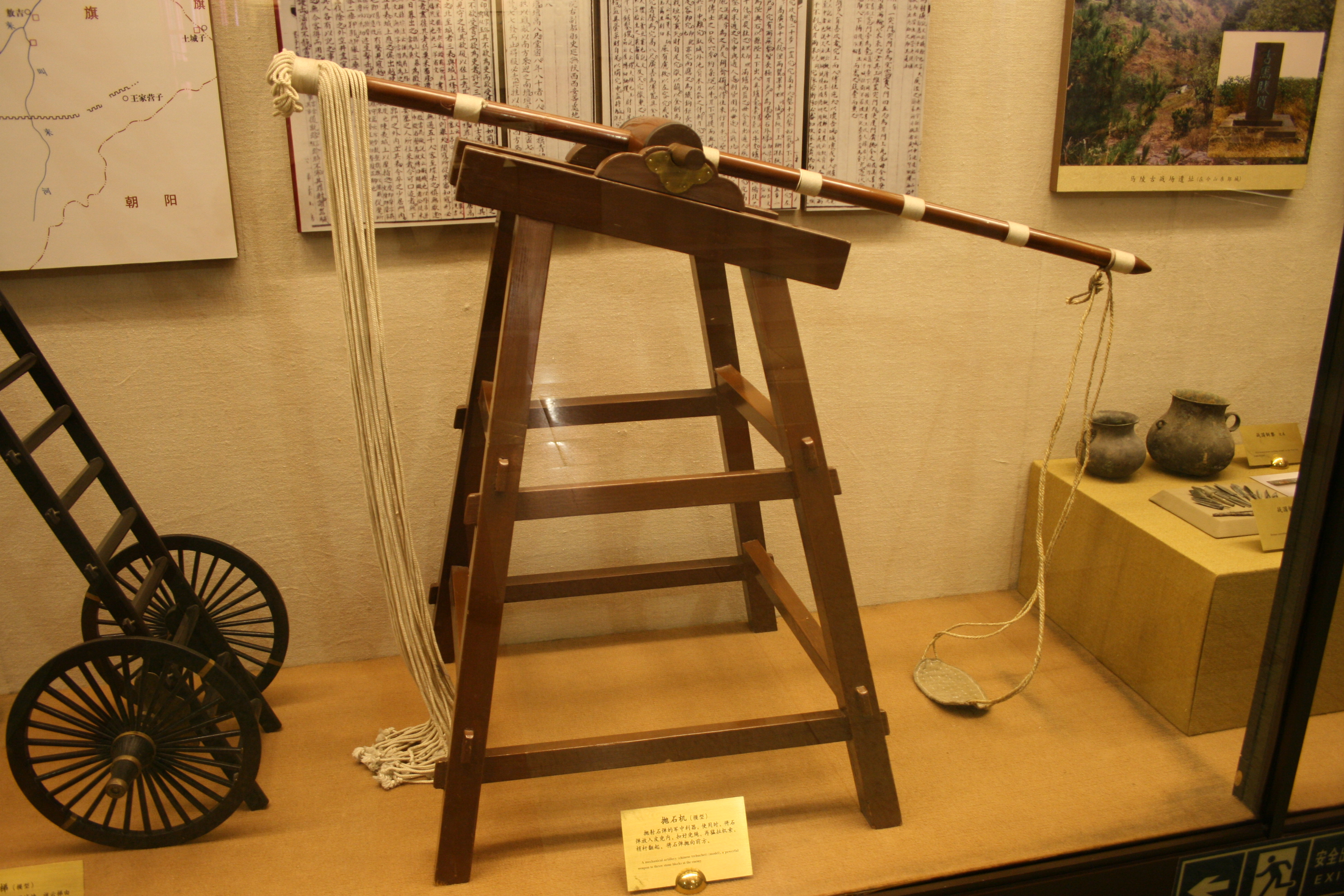
Model of a Warring States period traction trebuchet

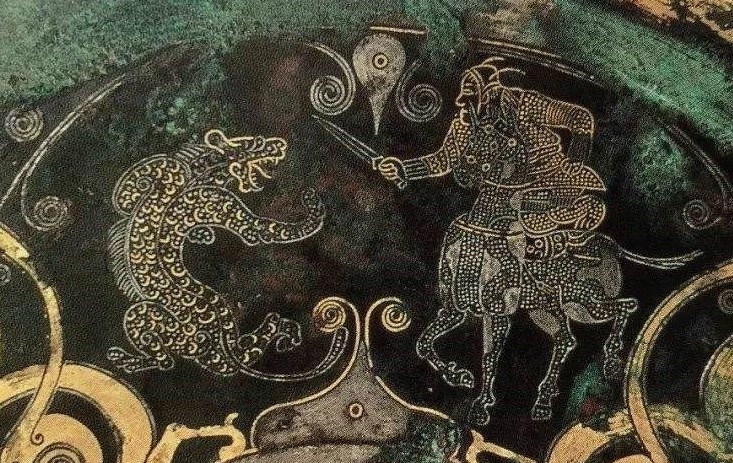
A horse-rider fighting a tiger, depicted on a gilded mirror discovered in Jincun, Luoyang

=== Increasing scale of warfare ===
The chariot was a major factor in Chinese warfare. Near the beginning of the Warring States period there is a shift from chariots to massed infantry, with new weapons such as swords and crossbows. This change was associated with the fall of chivalry. It would also lead to a massive increase in the scale of warfare. Battles would last months or even years.

When the Zhou overthrew the Shang at the Battle of Muye they used 45,000 troops and 300 chariots. For the Warring States period the following figures for the military strengths of various states are reported:

- Qin
  1,000,000 infantry, 1,000 chariots, 10,000 horses;
- Chu
  same numbers;
- Wei
  200–360,000 infantry, 200,000 spearmen, 100,000 servants, 600 chariots, 5,000 cavalry;
- Han
  300,000 total;
- Qi
  several hundred thousand;

For major battles, the following figures are reported:

- Battle of Maling
  100,000 killed;
- Battle of Yique
  240,000 killed;
- General Bai Qi is said to have been responsible for 890,000 enemy deaths over his career.

Scholars such as Michael Loewe and Edward L. Shaughnessy think these numbers are exaggerated (records are inadequate, they are much larger than those from similar societies, soldiers were paid by the number of enemies they killed and the Han dynasty had an interest in exaggerating the bloodiness of the age before China was unified). Regardless of exaggeration, it seems clear that warfare had become excessive during this period. The bloodshed and misery of the Warring States period goes a long way in explaining China's traditional and current preference for a united throne.

=== Military developments ===
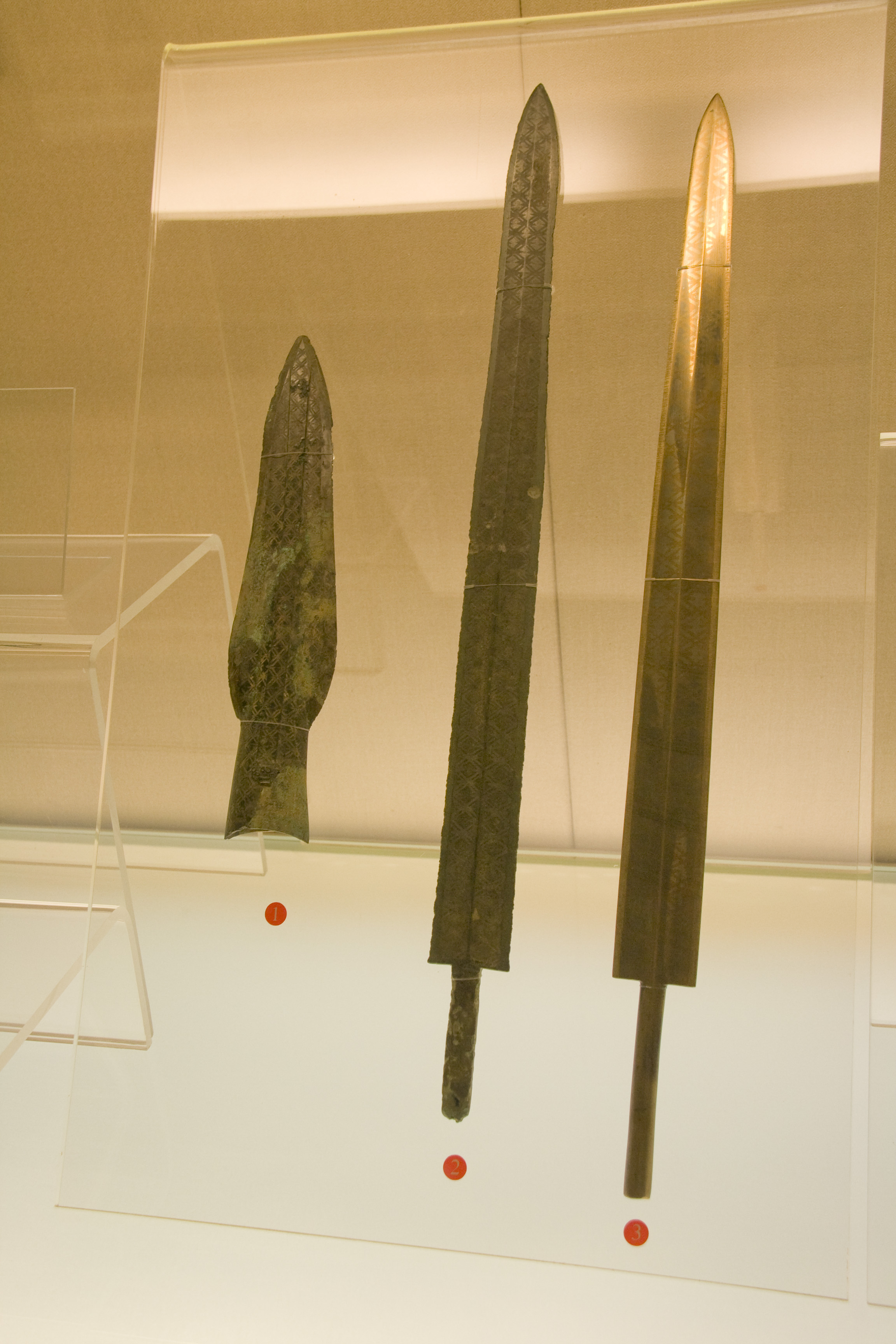
Warring States swords and spearhead with patterns

The Warring States period saw the introduction of many innovations to the art of warfare in China, such as the use of iron and of cavalry.

Han, Chu, and other states were among the first to employ the use of iron and steel in their weapons. States would also begin to erect fortresses, the most notable being the Great Wall of China to protect their borders. This period also saw developments of the halberd, crossbow, chariots, and archery.

The various states fielded massive armies of infantry, cavalry, and chariots. Complex logistical systems maintained by efficient government bureaucracies were needed to supply, train, and control such large forces. The size of the armies ranged from tens of thousands to several hundred thousand men. Iron weapons became more widespread and began to replace bronze. Most armour and weapons of this period were made from iron.

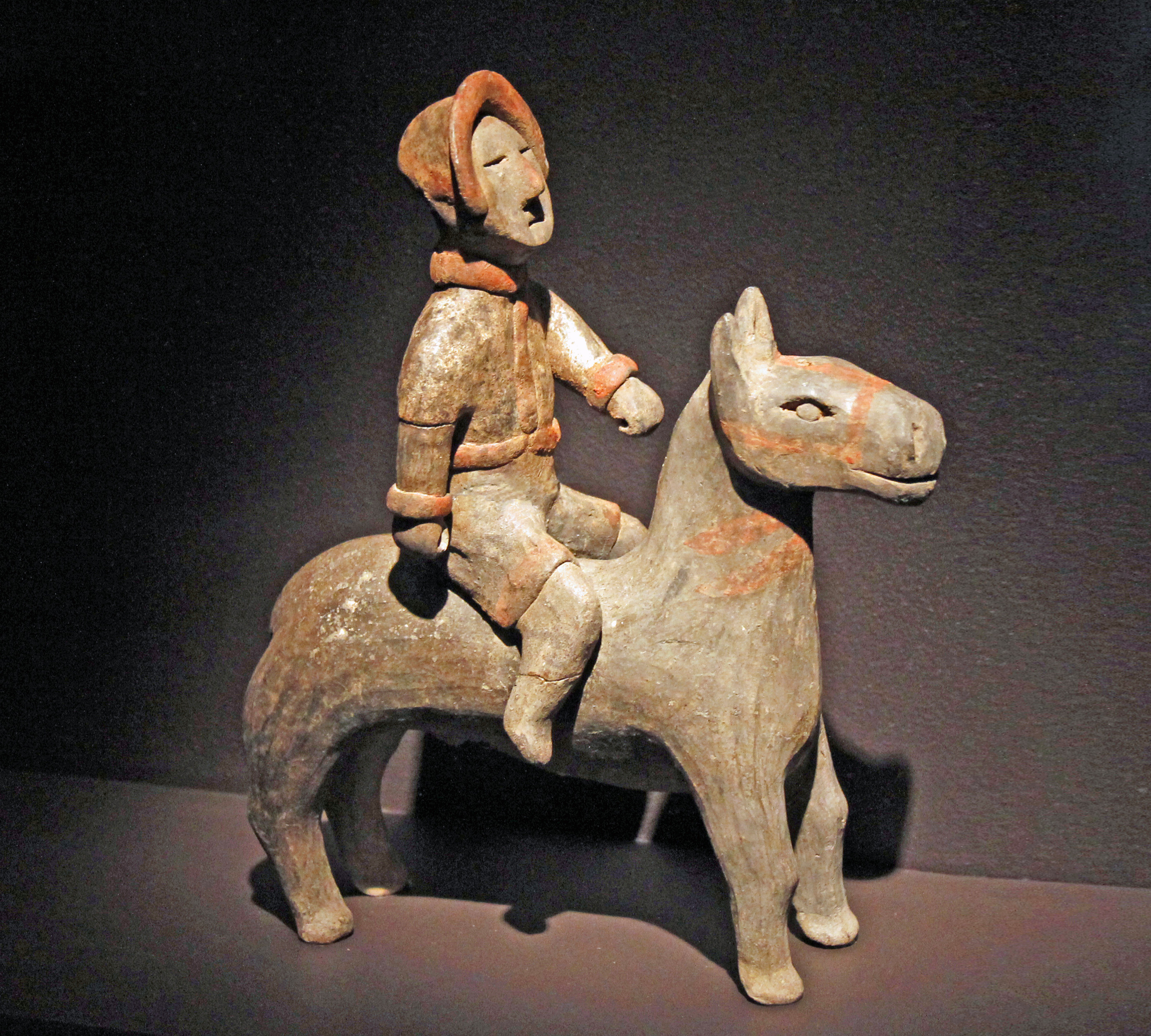
The Taerpo horserider, a Qin terracotta figurine from a tomb in the Taerpo cemetery (塔兒坡秦墓) near Xianyang in Shaanxi, 4th–3rd century BC. This is the earliest known representation of a cavalryman in China.

The first official native Chinese cavalry unit was formed in 307 BC during the military reforms of King Wuling of Zhao, who advocated 'nomadic dress and horse archery'. But the war chariot still retained its prestige and importance, despite the tactical superiority of cavalry.

=== Military thought ===
The Warring States was a great period for military strategy; of the Seven Military Classics of China, four were written during this period:

- The Art of War
  It is attributed to Sun Tzu, a highly influential study of strategy and tactics.
- Wuzi
  It is attributed to Wu Qi, a statesman and commander who served the states of Wei and then Chu.
- Wei Liaozi
  of uncertain authorship.
- The Methods of the Sima
  It is attributed to Sima Rangju, a commander serving the state of Qi.

It was also during this period that states became more aggressive, contrary to how they behaved in the Spring and Autumn period, usually for fostering alliances. Smaller states like Lu would quickly fall under the power of bigger states (in this case, Lu was occupied by Qi.)

== Culture and society ==
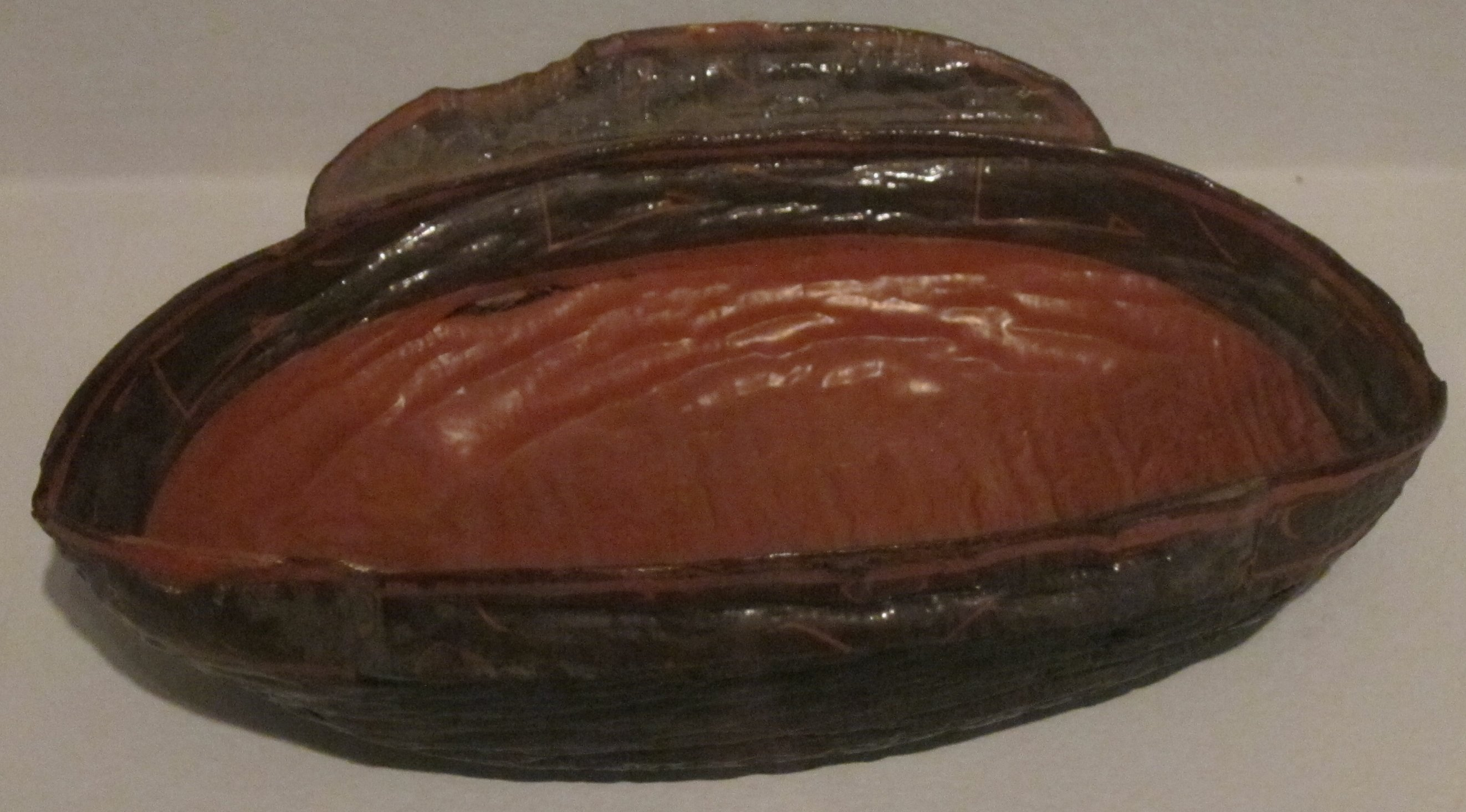
A Chinese lacquerware drinking vessel (over wood), Warring States period, Honolulu Museum of Art

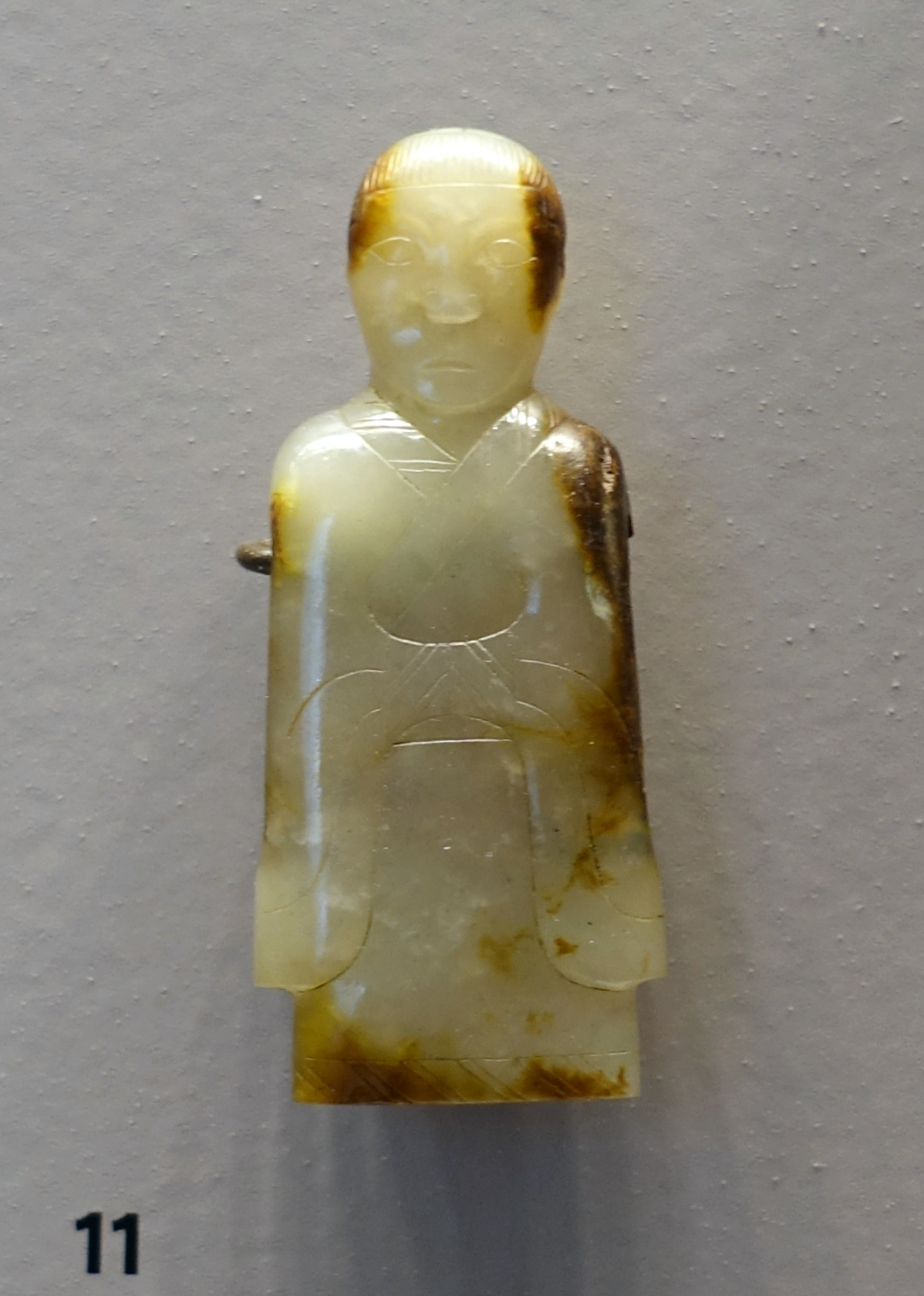
A nephrite pendant in the shape of a man wearing silk robes, 5th–3rd centuries BC, Warring States period, Arthur M. Sackler Museum

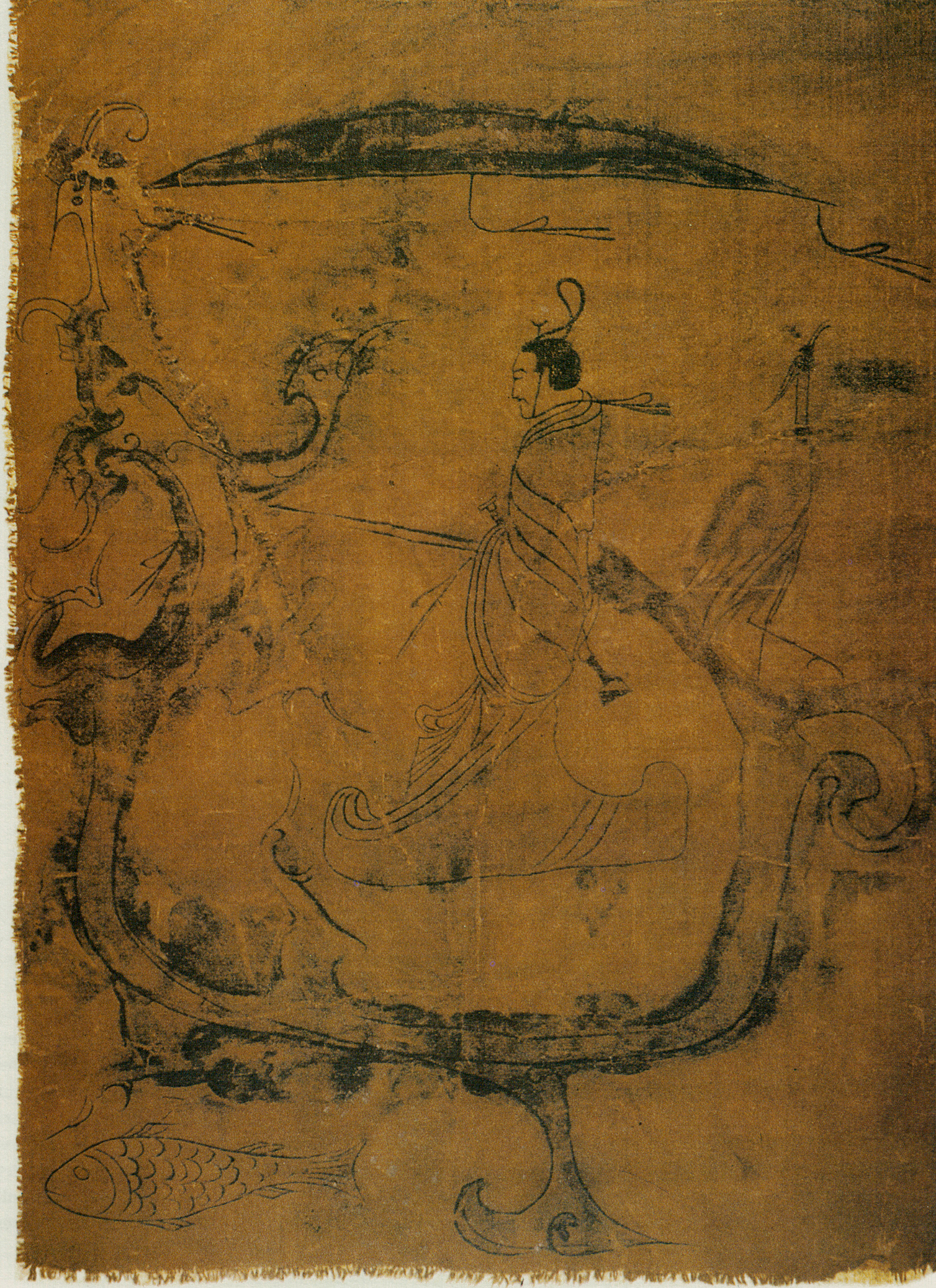
A painting on silk depicting a man riding a dragon from Zidanku Tomb no. 1 in Changsha, Hunan Province (5th–3rd century BC)

=== Economic developments ===
The Warring States period saw the rise of economic activities, the exchanges of various materials (e.g. gold and copper,) pottery, and weapons. It also saw a large demand for weapons, and as a result, led to the advancement of metalworking and the usage of iron. Artists were able to produce more profound artwork, mastering the use of jade and lacquer. Improvements in agriculture, tools, and irrigation gave the army their needed supplies and increased productivity amongst the populace. Ironmasters would often employ hundreds in some states, and it soon became a monopoly of the government.

Markets heavily prospered, alongside interstate commerce. In the capital of Qi, Linzi, the populated estimated to be 750,000, continued to be a hotspot for those who came to purchase salt, silk, iron and dried fish. It was also a hub for entertainment in music halls, brothels, and gamblers betting on dog races, cock fights, and football games.

The Guanzi is considered one of the most foundational texts of the developing political economy in the Warring States period. It addresses principles of price regulation in the context of effectively dealing with commodities that are "light" (connoting a commodity which is unimportant, non-essential, or inexpensive) or "heavy" (a commodity which is important, essential, or expensive) and how whether a commodity is "light" or "heavy" is understood in relation to other commodities.

The changing political structures of the Warring States also contributed to new forms of economic behaviour. Although the rulers of the Warring States continued to distribute fiefs (as had been the practice of the Zhou), these fiefs were generally not hereditary and did not include significant administrative authority over the fief's territory, instead serving mainly as a source of income for the fief-holder. Hence, fief-holders attempted to convert their fief incomes into more permanent revenue streams such as by buying private estates, using exemptions on paying transit taxes for goods shipped through customs stations, and by engaging in money-lending.

=== Philosophical developments ===
The constant conflict and need for innovative social and political models led to the development of many philosophical doctrines, later known as the Hundred Schools of Thought. The most notable schools of thought include Mohism (expounded by Mozi), Confucianism (represented by Mencius and Xunzi), Legalism (represented by Shang Yang, Shen Buhai, Shen Dao and Han Fei) and Taoism (represented by Zhuangzi and Lao Tzu).

Mohism was developed by Mozi (468–376 BC) and it provided a unified moral and political philosophy based on impartiality and benevolence. Mohists had the belief that people change depending on environments around. The same was applied to rulers, which is why one must be cautious of foreign influences. Mozi was very much against warfare, although he was a great tactician in defense. He defended the small state of Song from many attempts of the Chu state. He once said:

If it [war] is in winter it will be too cold, and if in summer it will be too hot. So it should be done neither in winter nor in summer. But if it is in spring it will take people away from sowing and planting, and if in fall it will take them away from reaping and harvesting. Should they be taken away in any of these seasons, innumerable people would die of hunger and cold. And, when the army sets out, the bamboo, arrows, plumed standards, house tents, armor, shields, and sword hilts will break and rot in innumerable quantities and never come back. Again with the spears, lances, swords, poniards, chariots and carts: these will break and rot in innumerable quantities and never come back. Innumerable horses and oxen will start out fat and come back lean, or will die and never come back at all. An innumerable people will die because their food will be cut off and cannot be supplied on account of the great distance of the roads, while other innumerable people will get sick and died from the constant danger, the irregularities of eating and drinking, and the extremes of hunger and over-eating. Then the army will be lost in large numbers or in its entirety; in either case the number will be innumerable.

— Feng Youlan, History of Chinese Philosophy. (trans. Derk Bodde)

Mencius attempted to instate Confucianism as a state philosophy, proposing that through the governing of moral principles like benevolence and righteousness, the state would win popular support from one state and those neighboring, eliminating the need of a war altogether. Mencius had attempted to convince King Hui of Liang, although was unsuccessful since the king saw no advantage in the period of wars.

Taoism was advocated by Laozi, and believed that human nature was good and can achieve perfection by returning to its original state. It believed that like a baby, humans are simple and innocent although with development of civilizations it lost its innocence only to be replaced by fraud and greed. Contrarily to other schools, it did not want to gain influence in the offices of states and Laozi even refused to be the minister of the state of Chu.

Legalism created by Shang Yang in 338 BC, rejected all notions of religion and practices, and believed a nation should be governed by strict law. Not only were severe punishments applied, but they would be grouped with the families and made mutually responsible for criminal act. It proposed radical reforms, and established a society based on solid ranks. Peasants were encouraged to practice agriculture as occupation, and military performance was rewarded. Laws were also applied to all ranks with no exception; even the king was not above punishment. The philosophy was adapted by the Qin state and it created it into an organized, centralized state with a bureaucracy chosen on the basis of merit. This period is most famous for the establishment of complex bureaucracies and centralized governments, as well as a clear legal system. The developments in political and military organization were the basis of the power of the Qin state, which conquered the other states and unified them under the Qin dynasty in 221 BC.

The rulers of the Warring States were not particularly interested with these kinds of pacifistic philosophy, who behaved the way they did because of urgent matters rather than the works of philosophy, but this is not to say that they were uncivilized; in fact, most of these rulers were wealthy, educated men who lived in luxurious courts.

=== Sophisticated arithmetic ===
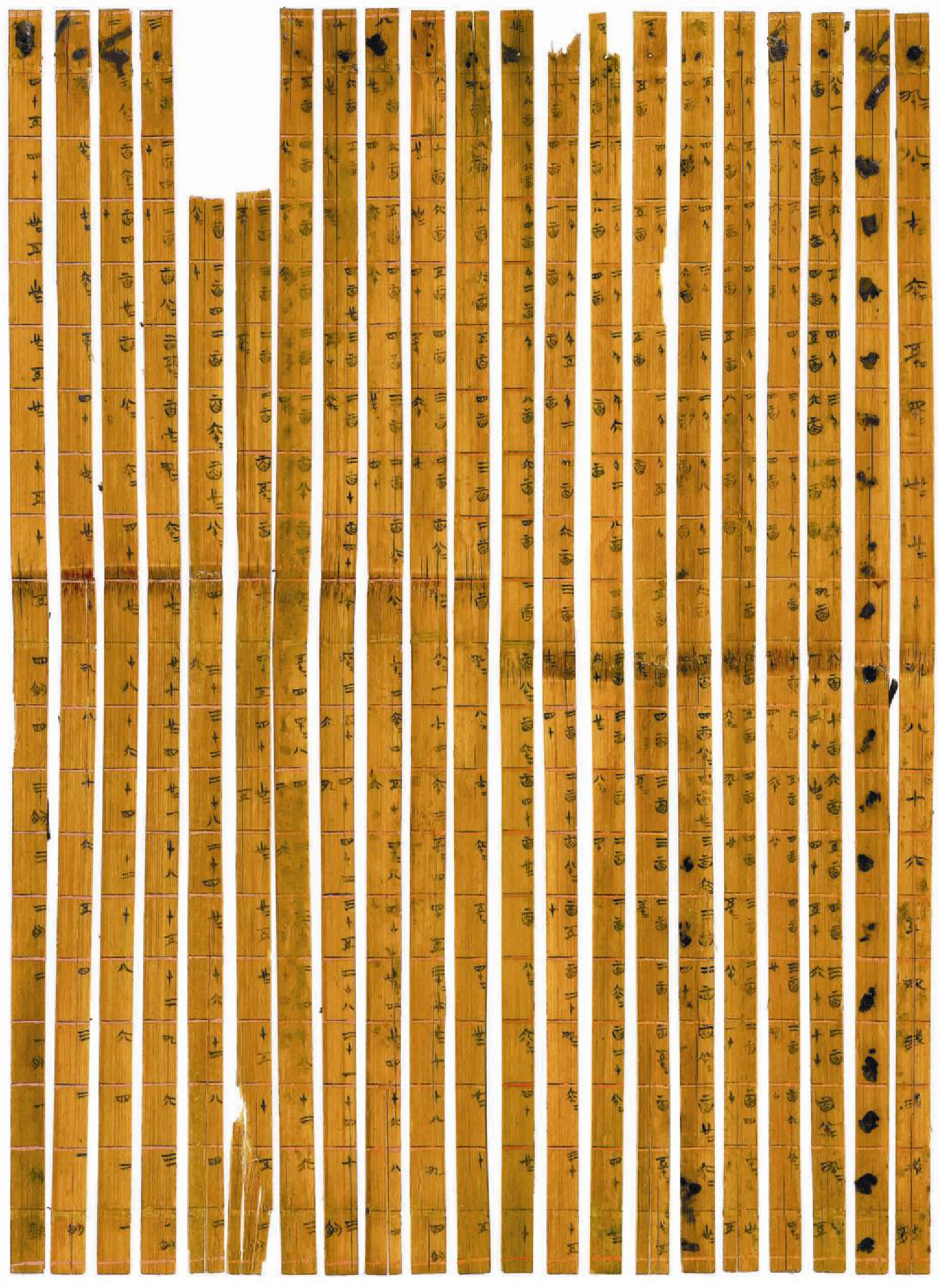
The Tsinghua Bamboo Slips containin the world's earliest decimal multiplication table, dated 305 BC.

A bundle of 21 bamboo slips from the Tsinghua collection dated to 305 BC are the world's earliest example of a two digit decimal multiplication table, indicating that sophisticated commercial arithmetic was already established during this period. The nine linked-rings puzzle, an advanced puzzle device which requires mathematical analysis to solve, was invented during the period.

=== Literature ===
An important literary achievement of the Warring States period is the Zuo Commentary on the Spring and Autumn Annals, which summarizes the preceding Spring and Autumn period. The less famous work Guoyu is thought to be by the same author.

Many sayings of Spring and Autumn philosophers, which had previously been circulated orally, were put into writing during the time of the Warring States, such as the Analects.

== See also ==
- Feudalism
- Sengoku period – A period in Japanese history named after this period
- Three Kingdoms
- Warlord Era
