= Wei Manduo =

5th-century BC ruler of the Wei clan

Viscount Xiang of Wei 魏襄子

Leader of Wei clan
- Predecessor: Viscount Jian of Wei (魏簡子)
- Successor: Viscount Huan of Wei
- Issue: Viscount Huan (Wei Ju)
Names
- Ancestral name: Jī (姬); Lineage name: Wèi (魏); Given name: Chí (侈) or Mànduō (曼多) or Duō (哆)
Posthumous name
- Viscount Xiang (襄子)
- House: Ji
- Father: Viscount Jian (Wei Qu)

Wei Manduo (fl. 5th century BC), also known by his posthumous name as the Viscount Xiang of Wei, was a leader of the Wei clan in the Jin state (predecessor of Wei state), where he served as dafu (大夫).

Wei Manduo State of Wei
Regnal titles
Preceded by Wei Jian-zi (魏簡子/魏简子)	Ruler of Wei ?–?	Succeeded by Wei Huan-zi (魏桓子)
