= Zhao Yang (Spring and Autumn) =

Zhao Yang 趙鞅 (d. c. 475 BCE), cognomen (Zhao) Meng 孟, also known as Ying Yang 趙鞅 (personal), Zhi Fu 志父, and posthumously as Zhao Jian-zi 趙簡子 or Viscount Jian of Zhao, was a fifth century bce Jin state Head noble (or Clan leader) of the Zhao lineage. Serving as Chief minister under Duke Ding 晉定公 (r. 512–475), he was head of the Jin state government and army as its highest military commander, as well as a legal reformer, with the feudal-era Jin state uniting civil and military authority. He was the paternal Grandson of Zhao Wu (趙武).

After the rebellion of Prince Chao, and a strategy meeting in the summer of 517, Zhao Yang and a Zhi Li led the Jin army to reinstate the king in 516. In 513 Zhao Yang inscribed a new penal code in iron together with Xun Yin 荀寅. On orders, he oversaw the construction of a city wall for the town of Rubin 汝濱, formerly Luhun 陸渾, where there were Di tribes.

He commanded the Jin army when it besieged, in order, the two allied states of Zheng and then Wei 衛 in 500. He forced a re-establishment of Wei's alliance with Wei as subordinate. Three years later Zhao Yang was supported by the king against other noble houses attacking him (Fan and Zhonghang), expelling them. After the opposing nobles retreated to the Qi state 齊, he annexed a portion of their territory together with his supporters, viscounts of Wei 魏, Han and Zhi 智 (or 知).

He should not be confused with earlier clan leader and Zhao Viscount Zhao Dun, cognomen (Zhao) Meng 孟, or a less famous Zhao Yang from the Wei state.

Zhao Yang had sons, Zhao Bolu and Zhao Wuxu, Zhao Bolu was the paternal Grandfather of Zhao Huan.

== In literature ==
In the moral lessons of the Zuozhuan, during the strategy meeting of 517, on questioning Zhao Yang emphasizes the importance of ritual propriety over ceremony and stresses the natural relationships within families as a guiding principle for the people, quoting Zichan.

Succeeding the Jin state, Zhao Yang is also quoted by a text attributed to Han Fei of the Hann state, in the Han Feizi. Although the Han Feizi quotes many earlier thinkers, Zhao Yang may have been relevant as an earlier penal reformer. The phrase attributed to Zhao Yang says: "However vile the hat, it is on the head that it must be worn; however precious the shoes, they must be placed on the feet." Han Fei argued for the institutional value of the prince, even if that prince was "vile".

A scribe that Zhao Yang speaks with in the Zuozhuan emphasizes that the relation between ruler and subject are not constant, but depend on virtue. However, it does emphasize such relations at least in reverse, saying that "kings have their lords, and princes have their high ministers."

== Sources ==
- Ulrich Theobald 2012, Zhao Jianzi 趙簡子 Zhao Yang 趙鞅, chinaknowledge.de
- Yuri Pines, FOUNDATIONS OF CONFUCIAN THOUGHT. pages 19,116,332
- Stephen Durrant, 2020 The Zuo tradition. pages 128,145
- H. Miller, 2015, The Gongyang Commentary on The Spring and Autumn Annals. 255–256
- Vandermeersch, Léon (1987) [1965]. La formation du légisme. École française d'Extrême-Orient. ISBN 2855395410.
- 中國早期國家性質. Zhishufang press. 2003. p. 304. ISBN 9789867938176. (re: Jin (Chinese state), united civil and military authority)
