= Marquess Xian of Zhao =

Leader of the Chinese State of Zhao from 423 to 409 BCE

Zhao Huan

Leader of Zhao clan
- Reign: 423 BCE - 409 BCE
- Predecessor: Zhao Jia (Zhao Huan-zi)
- Successor: Marquess Lie
- Died: 409 BCE
Names
- Ancestral name: Yíng (嬴); Lineage name: Zhào (趙); Given name: Huàn (浣)
Posthumous name
- Xiàn (獻); Marquess Xiàn (獻侯)
- Father: Zhao Zhou (grandson of Zhao Yang)

Chinese name
- Traditional Chinese: 趙獻侯
- Simplified Chinese: 赵献侯
Transcriptions
Standard Mandarin
- Hanyu Pinyin: Zhào Xiàn Hóu

Marquess Xian of Zhao (died 409 BCE) (simplified Chinese: 赵献侯; traditional Chinese: 趙獻侯; pinyin: Zhào Xiàn Hóu) or Zhao Xianzi was a ruler of the State of Zhao from 423 BCE to 409 BCE during the Warring States period of ancient China.

Born Zhào Huàn (simplified Chinese: 赵浣; traditional Chinese: 趙浣), he was the son of Zhao Zhou (simplified Chinese: 赵周; traditional Chinese: 趙周), Zhao Zhou was the son of Zhao Bolu (simplified Chinese: 赵伯鲁; traditional Chinese: 趙伯魯), Zhao Bolu was the son of Zhao Yang.

Zhào Xiāngzĭ believed that it was illegal for him to be the successor to Zhào Bólŭ and wanted to return his inheritance so that Zhào Huàn would become heir apparent.

After Zhào Huàn became leader he was banished from the Zhao capitals of Zhongmu County (Chinese: 中牟) (in modern-day Henan) and Dai Commandery (near modern-day Yuzhou in Hebei) by Zhao Huanzi (simplified Chinese: 赵桓子; traditional Chinese: 趙桓子), who usurped Zhào Huàn's position and installed himself as ruler.

A year later, Zhào Huánzĭ died and the local people killed all his sons. As a result, Zhào Huàn once more became leader of Zhao. After he died he was awarded the posthumous title of Zhào Xiànzĭ whilst his son became Marquess Lie of Zhao (simplified Chinese: 赵烈侯; traditional Chinese: 趙烈侯; pinyin: Zhào Liè Hóu) who subsequently altered his father's posthumous title to Marquess Xian of Zhao.
