= Zhao Wuxu =

5th-century BC head of Chinese house of Zhao in Jin state

Viscount Xiang of Zhao 趙襄子

Leader of Zhao clan
- Reign: 458–425 BC
- Predecessor: Viscount Jian of Zhao (趙簡子)
- Successor: Viscount Huan of Zhao (趙桓子)
- Died: 425 BC
- Issue: Viscount Huan (Zhao Jia)
Names
- Ancestral name: Yíng (嬴); Lineage name: Zhào (趙); Given name: Wúxù (毋卹 or 無恤)
Posthumous name
- Viscount Xiang (襄子)
- House: Ying
- Father: Viscount Jian (Zhao Yang)

Zhao Wuxu (Chinese: 趙毋卹), also known by his posthumous name as the Viscount Xiang of Zhao (趙襄子), was a leader of the Zhao clan in the Jin state. During his tenure as clan leader of Zhao, he entered into an alliance with the Han (韓) and Wei (魏) clans, and annihilated the Zhi (知) clan in the Battle of Jinyang.

== Early life ==
Wuxu was born to a Di (翟) slave of Jianzi of Zhao (趙簡子). Despite his low status, his abilities gained the recognition of Gubu Ziqing (姑布子卿), an advisor of the house of Zhao, who recommended him to Jianzi. Gradually, Wuxu became Jianzi's favourite son. Once, Jianzi informed all his sons about a hidden treasure, a precious fu (符, a military seal) on Mount Chang (常山, modern Mount Heng), and promised a reward for whoever recovered it first. While all others returned empty-handed, only Wuxu grasped his father's true meaning – the strategic terrains there served as a perfect basis for a military campaign against the state of Dai, whose lands were considered the true prize. This event led Jianzi to name Wuxu as his successor, instead of the former heir, Bolu (伯魯).

In 464 BC, Zhi Yao attacked Zheng, and Wuxu was sent to assist him. While drunk, the Zhi leader hit Wuxu with a filled wine vessel. Wuxu's men asked to kill Zhi, to which Wuxu responded, "the reason why my father sent me is that I am capable of showing restraint". (Note: 「君所以置毋卹，為能忍。」) Later, Zhi Yao asked Jianzi to disinherit Wuxu, but was refused.

== As head of Zhao clan ==
Xiangzi succeeded as the head of the house of Zhao in 458 BC. Soon, he invited the ruler of Dai, who was married to Xiangzi's sister, to a banquet where he had the Dai king assassinated. The king's consort committed suicide, and Xiangzi proceeded to conquer Dai. Later, he enfeoffed the lands of Dai to Zizhou (子周), son of the now deceased Bolu.

In 454 BC, the houses of Zhi, Zhao, Han and Wei jointly divided the lands formerly held by the houses Fan (范) and Zhonghang (中行). This act angered Duke Chu of Jin, who requested the states Qi and Lu to punish the four families. In return, the four houses attacked Duke Chu. The Duke of Jin fled to Qi and died on his way. Zhi Yao selected Jiao (驕) as the new ruler, later known as Duke Yi of Jin. Afterwards, Zhi demanded land from Zhao, Wei and Han, among which only Zhao refused.

Zhi, along with his allies Han and Wei, declared war on Zhao and laid siege to Jinyang (晉陽). During the battle, Xiangzi sent his prime minister Zhang Meng (張孟) to Han and Wei, who successfully persuaded the two families to switch to Zhao's side. After the war, the house of Zhi was destroyed, and Zhao became the most powerful house in Jin.

Xiangzi died after 33 years of reign. After his death, Zizhou's son Huan (浣), later known as Marquess Xian of Zhao (趙獻侯), succeeded him.
