= Family tree of Chinese monarchs (Spring and Autumn period) =

This is a family tree of Chinese monarchs during the Spring and Autumn period.

Family trees of Chinese monarchs
- (ancient)
- (Spring and Autumn period)
- (Warring States period)
- (early)
- (middle)
- (late)

== Spring and Autumn period ==
The Spring and Autumn period was a period in Chinese history from approximately 770 to 476 BC (or according to some authorities until 403 BC (Note: The Partition of Jin, the watershed between the Spring and Autumn and Warring States periods took several decades, thus there is some debate between scholars as to the exact date. 481 BCE, 475 BC, and 468 BC are other common dates selected by historians.)) which corresponds roughly to the first half of the Eastern Zhou period. The period's name derives from the Spring and Autumn Annals, a chronicle of the state of Lu between 722 and 479 BCE, which tradition associates with Confucius (551–479 BCE).

=== Jin ===
Jin state

Emperor Ku 嚳
Houji 后稷
Buzhu 不窋
Ju 鞠
Gongliu 公劉
Qingjie 慶節
Huangpu 皇僕
Chaifu 差弗
Huiyu 毀渝
Gongfei 公非
Gaoyu 高圉
Yayu 亞圉
Gongshu Zulei 公叔祖類; Duke Zulei of Shu
Tai of Zhou 周太王
Jili 季歷	Wu Taibo 吳太伯	Zhongyong 仲雍
Wen of Zhou 周文王; 1152-1099 –1050–1056BC	State of Wu
Wu of Zhou 武王 ?–(1050–)1046 –1043 BC
Cheng of Zhou 周成王; 1042–1021 BC	Shu Yu of Tang 唐叔虞; 1042–? BCE
Kang of Zhou 周康王; 1021–996 BC	Xie of Jin 晉侯燮
Zhou dynasty	Wu of Jin 晉武侯
Cheng of Jin 晉成侯
Li of Jin 晉厲侯 ?–859 BC
Jing of Jin 晉靖侯; 858–841 BC
Xi of Jin 晉釐侯; 841–823 BC	Boqiao 伯僑
Xian of Jin 晉獻侯; 823–812 BC	□
Mu of Jin 晉穆侯; 812–785 BC	Shang Shu 晉殤叔; 785–781BC	Tu 突
Wen of Jin 晉文侯; 780–746 BC	Huan Shu of Quwo 曲沃桓叔; 745–731 BC
Zhao of Jin 晉昭侯; 745–739BC	Zhuang Bo of Quwo 曲沃莊伯; 731–716 BCE	Wuzi of Han 韩武子
Xiao of Jin 晉孝侯; 739–724 BC	Wu of Quwo and Jin 曲沃(晉)武公; 679–677 BC	Qiubo of Han 韓赇伯
E of Jin 晉鄂侯; 724–718 BC	Xian of Jin 晉獻公; 676–651 BC	Hán Jiǎn 韓简
Ai of Jin 晉哀侯; 717–709 BC	Min of Jin 晉侯緡; 704–678 BCE	Shensheng 申生 d. 655 BC	Wen of Jin 重耳; 697–636–628 BC	Hui of Jin 晉惠公; 650–637 BC	Xiqi of Jin 奚齊; 665–651 BC	Zhuozi of Jin 卓子 d. 651	Ziyu 子舆
Xiaozi of Jin 晉小子侯; 708–705 BC	Xiang of Jin 晋襄公; 627–621 BC	Cheng of Jin 晋成公; 606–600 BC	Huai of Jin 晉懷公; 637 BC	Xianzi of Han 韩献子
Ling of Jin 晋灵公; 620–607 BC	Jie 桓叔捷	Jing of Jin 晋景公; 599–581 BC	State of Han
Tan 惠伯談	Li of Jin 晋厉公; 580–573 BC
Dao of Jin 晉悼公; 586–573-558 BC
Ping of Jin 晋平公; 557–532 BC
Zhao of Jin 晋昭公; 531–526 BC
Qing of Jin 晉頃公; 525–512 BC	戴子雍
Ding of Jin 晉定公; 511–475 BC	Ji 忌
Chu of Jin 晉出公; 474–452 BC	Jing of Jin 晉敬公; 451–434 BC
You of Jin 晉幽公; 433–416 BC
Lie of Jin 晉烈公; 415–389 BC
Huan of Jin 晉桓公; 388–369 BC
Jing of Jin 晉靜公; 356–349 BC(?)
