= Sacrifice (2010 film) =

2010 historical drama film

- Film poster
- 赵氏孤儿
- Directed by: Chen Kaige
- Screenplay by: Chen Kaige; Zhao Ningyu
- Based on: The Orphan of Zhao by Ji Junxiang
- Produced by: Ren Zhonglun; Long Qiuyun; Qin Hong; Chen Hong
- Starring: Ge You; Wang Xueqi; Fan Bingbing; Vincent Zhao; Huang Xiaoming
- Cinematography: Yang Shu
- Edited by: Derek Hui
- Music by: Ma Shangyou
- Production companies: 21 Century Shengkai Film; Shanghai Film Group; Stellar Megamedia; TIK Films
- Distributed by: Stellar Megamedia
- Release date: 4 December 2010
- Running time: 124 minutes
- Country: China
- Language: Mandarin
- Budget: US$10 million
- Box office: US$29,093,560

Sacrifice (赵氏孤儿) is a 2010 Chinese historical drama film adapted from the 13th-century play The Orphan of Zhao by Ji Junxiang. Directed by Chen Kaige, the film starred Ge You, Wang Xueqi, Huang Xiaoming, Fan Bingbing and Vincent Zhao. It was distributed in the United States by Samuel Goldwyn Films.

== Synopsis ==
The story is set in the 6th-century BC in Jin, a duchy under the Zhou dynasty of ancient China. The Zhao clan, led by Chancellor Zhao Dun and his son General Zhao Shuo, are in a power struggle against General Tu'an Gu.

Tu'an Gu murders the Duke of Jin and pushes the blame to the Zhaos, using that as an excuse to execute the entire Zhao clan. The sole survivor of the Zhao clan is Zhao Shuo's infant son, Zhao Wu, whose mother is the Duke's sister Lady Zhuang. Lady Zhuang pleads with Tu'an Gu's subordinate Han Jue to spare her child. She then instructs the physician Cheng Ying to take her child to Gongsun Chujiu, a friend of the Zhao clan, before committing suicide.

When Tu'an Gu learns that Zhao Wu has evaded him, he slashes his sword at Han Jue's face in anger and disfigures him. Then, he orders his men to seal the gates and gather all the newborn babies in the city, believing that whoever is hiding Zhao Wu will not hand him over and hence making it easier to identify Zhao Wu.

After Cheng Ying takes Zhao Wu home, his wife hands over the baby to Tu'an Gu. Cheng Ying then asks Gongsun Chujiu to take his wife and his son (disguised as Zhao Wu) out of the city, while he stays behind to try to save the real Zhao Wu from Tu'an Gu. When Tu'an Gu finds Cheng Ying suspicious, Cheng Ying lies that Zhao Wu has been taken out of the city by Gongsun Chujiu. Tu'an Gu then leads his men to Gongsun Chujiu's house and finds Cheng Ying's wife and son there. Mistaking Cheng Ying's son for Zhao Wu, Tu'an Gu kills the infant along with Gongsun Chujiu and Cheng Ying's wife.

Devastated by the loss of his family, Cheng Ying swears vengeance on Tu'an Gu. He pretends to be loyal to Tu'an Gu and raises Zhao Wu in Tu'an Gu's household. Tu'an Gu seemingly believes that Zhao Wu is Cheng Ying's son and adopts the boy as his godson. Zhao Wu grows up under Tu'an Gu's care and develops a close bond with his godfather. Meanwhile, Cheng Ying becomes close friends with the disfigured Han Jue and they secretly plot to help Zhao Wu avenge the Zhao clan.

One day, Cheng Ying breaks the truth to Zhao Wu, telling him that Tu'an Gu, who has been a fatherly figure to him for the past 15 years, is responsible for murdering the Zhao clan. Initially unable to believe what he has heard, Zhao Wu ultimately accepts the truth after hearing from Han Jue about how Cheng Ying sacrificed his own son to save him.

When Zhao Wu and Cheng Ying finally confront Tu'an Gu, he reveals that he has known all along that Zhao Wu is Zhao Shuo's son due to the resemblance in their appearances. Zhao Wu duels with Tu'an Gu but is no match for the latter. At a critical moment, Cheng Ying sacrifices himself to give Zhao Wu an opportunity to stab and kill Tu'an Gu. As Cheng Ying succumbs to his wounds, he has a vision of himself reuniting with his family.

== Cast ==
- Ge You as Cheng Ying
- Wang Xueqi as Tu'an Gu
- Zhang Fengyi as Gongsun Chujiu
- Vincent Zhao as Zhao Shuo
- Fan Bingbing as Lady Zhuang
- Huang Xiaoming as Han Jue
- Bao Guo'an as Zhao Dun
- Peng Bo as the Duke of Jin
- Wang Han as Zhao Wu (late teens)
  - Zhao Wenhao as Zhao Wu (early teens)
- Hai Qing as Cheng Ying's wife

== See also ==
- List of Asian historical drama films
