= Jing of Jin =

Jing of Jin may refer to:

- Marquis Jing of Jin (died 841 BC)
- Duke Jing of Jin (Ju) (晉景公, died 581 BC), personal name Ju
- Duke Jing of Jin (Jiao) (晉敬公, died 434 BC), personal name Jiao, also called Duke Ai or Duke Yi of Jin
- Duke Jing of Jin (Jujiu) (晉静公, died the 4th century BC), personal name Jujiu
- Sima Shi (208–255), posthumously honored as Emperor Jing of Jin
