= Duke Jing =

Duke Jing may refer to these rulers from China's Eastern Zhou period:

- Duke Jing of Jin (Ju) (died 581 BC)
- Duke Jing of Jin (Jiao) (died 434 BC)
- Duke Jing of Jin (Jujiu) (fl. 349 BC)
- Duke Jing of Qin (died 537 BC)
- Duke Jing of Qi (died 490 BC)

== See also ==
- King Jing (disambiguation)
- Marquis Jing (disambiguation)
