= Zhao Wu =

Viscount Wen of Zhao 趙文子

Leader of Zhao clan
- Reign: 583–541 BC
- Predecessor: Viscount Zhuang of Zhao
- Successor: Viscount Jing of Zhao (趙景子)
- Born: 598 BC
- Died: 541 BC
- Issue: Zhao Huo; Viscount Jing (Zhao Cheng)
Names
- Ancestral name: Yíng (嬴); Lineage name: Zhào (趙); Given name: Wǔ (武)
Posthumous name
- Viscount Wen (文子)
- House: Ying
- Father: Viscount Zhuang (Zhao Shuo)
- Mother: Zhuang Ji (莊姬; daughter of Duke Cheng of Jin)

Zhao Wu (Chinese: 趙武; pinyin: Zhào Wǔ, 598–541 BC), also known by his posthumous name as the Viscount Wen of Zhao (Chinese: 趙文子; pinyin: Zhào Wén Zǐ), was a leader of the Zhao clan in the Jin state. He was the only son of Zhao Shuo (Viscount Zhuang), whom he succeeded as clan leader. The Chinese folktale The Orphan of Zhao was based on the story of Zhao Wu, which was adapted into the 18th century French play L'Orphelin de la Chine.

Zhao Wu was the paternal Grandfather of Zhao Yang.

== Life ==
In 583 BCE, Viscount Xian of Han gave his political support to Zhao Wu and made him the successor of Zhuangzi. However, Zhao Wu did not enter the aristocratic rank of Qing (卿) during the reign of Duke Li of Jin. After Duke Li's death, Duke Dao appointed Zhao Wu a Qing upon his accession. This promotion occurred in the year of 573 BCE. Since Viscount Xian of Han was in charge of the country, Zhao clan under Zhao Wu did not possess the regency of Jin at first.

In 560 BCE, Zhao Wu was appointed the commander of upper army of Jin with the recommendation from Viscount Xuan of Han. In 555 BCE, Duke Ping of Jin gathered the troops of various states and invaded the state of Qi. Zhao Wu received the order of besieging Lu (盧) with Viscount Xuan of Han. The Jin army was victorious. Duke Xiang of Lu rewarded Jin nobles, including Zhao Wu, greatly since Qi, the enemy of Lu, was weakened. At this point of time, the regency of Jin was possessed by Viscount Xuan of Fan. In 550 BCE, Jin's civil war broke out. The Luan clan was exterminated by Fan clan, and its members were executed. No evidence of Zhao's participation in this civil war was found.

In 548 BCE, Zhao Wu obtained the regency of Jin. His pacifist approach weakened the tension between Jin and Chu, the two major states of Spring and Autumn period. In addition, he reduced the amount of tribute paid by minor states to Jin in order to relieve these minor states from extra financial burdens and exploitation. According to his own words, "Wars can finally come to an end". In 547 BCE, the state of Wey was in the chaos caused by a civil war. Zhao Wu met with clansmen of Sun clan which was at war with its lord, Duke Xian of Wey. With Zhao's support, Sun clan obtained sixty towns in western Wey.

In 546 BCE, Zhao Wu facilitated the Truce of Mibing by collaborating with Xiang Xu and Qu Jian. During the meeting and discussions, Jin and Chu agreed to truce. Jin obtained the political supremacy over the state of Qi (齊), Chen, Cai, Bei Yan, Qi (杞), Hu, Shen, and Baidi.

In 541 BCE, Zhao Wu travelled to Guo and the state of Zheng with the purpose of strengthening the truce. Even King Jing of Zhou did not ignore the presence of Zhao Wu and sent Duke Ding of Liu to receive him.

Zhao Wu died before the year of 537 BCE. His son Zhao Cheng succeeded him.

Throughout his life, Zhao Wu had been known as an impartial man. In his funeral, people who do not know him well attended because they received the recommendation from Zhao Wu according to their actual talent instead of their political bond with Zhao.

== Sources ==
- Zuo Zhuan. Taiyuan: Shanxi Guji Press. 2004. ISBN 9787805985374.
- Shao, Zenghua (1990). 韓非子今註今譯. 臺灣商務印書館. pp. 619–621. ISBN 9789570501476.
