= King Xiao =

King Xiao may refer to:

- King Xiao of Zhou (died 886 BC?)
- King Xiao of Yan (died 255 BC)

== See also ==
- Liu Wu, Prince of Liang (c. 184–144 BC), posthumously named Prince Xiao of Liang
- Duke Xiao (disambiguation)
- Marquis Xiao (disambiguation)
