= Marquis Jing =

Marquis Jing may refer to these rulers from China's Zhou dynasty:

- Marquis Jing of Jin (died 841 BC)
- Marquess Jing of Han (died 400 BC)
- Marquess Jing of Zhao (died 375 BC)

== See also ==
- Duke Jing (disambiguation)
- King Jing (disambiguation)
