= Cheng of Jin =

Cheng of Jin may refer to:

- Marquis Cheng of Jin (fl. 10th century BC?)
- Duke Cheng of Jin (died 600 BC)
- Emperor Cheng of Jin (321–342)
