= Wu of Jin =

Wu of Jin may refer to:

- Marquis Wu of Jin (fl. 10th century BC?)
- Duke Wu of Jin (died 677 BC)
- Emperor Wu of Jin (266–290)
