= Ai of Jin =

Ai of Jin may refer to:

- Marquis Ai of Jin (died 709 BC)
- Duke Jing of Jin (Jiao) (died 434 BC), called Duke Ai of Jin in one chapter of Records of the Grand Historian
- Emperor Ai of Jin (341–365)

== See also ==
- Emperor Aizong of Jin (1198–1234)
