= Xiao Hou =

Xiao Hou may refer to:

- Hsiao Ho (actor) (Chinese: 小侯; pinyin: Xiǎo Hóu, born 1958), Hong Kong actor
- Marquis Xiao (disambiguation) (Chinese: 孝侯; pinyin: Xiào Hóu)
- Empress Xiao (disambiguation) (Chinese: 蕭后; pinyin: Xiāo Hòu)
