= Zhao Shuo =

Zhao dynasty Lord

Viscount Zhuang of Zhao 趙莊子

Leader of Zhao clan
- Reign: 601–597 BC
- Predecessor: Viscount Xuan
- Successor: Viscount Wen
- Died: 597 BC
- Spouse: Zhuang Ji (莊姬; daughter of Duke Cheng of Jin)
- Issue: Zhao Wu (Viscount Wen)
Names
- Ancestral name: Yíng (嬴); Lineage name: Zhào (趙); Given name: Shuò (朔)
Posthumous name
- Viscount Zhuang (莊子)
- House: Ying
- Father: Zhao Dun (Viscount Xuan)

Zhao Shuo (Chinese: 趙朔; pinyin: Zhào Shuò), also known by his posthumous name as the Viscount Zhuang of Zhao (Chinese: 趙莊子), was a leader of the Zhao clan in the Jin state, where he served as dafu (大夫). He was a son of his predecessor, Zhao Dun (Viscount Xuan).

== Life ==
In 597 BCE, Zhao Shuo participated in the Battle of Bi between the states of Jin and Chu. He was the commander of the lower army; one of the three armies of Jin.

He was presumably murdered during the disaster of Xiagong. However, no other mentions of Zhao Shuo were found in Zuo Zhuan, the primary historical record of the Spring and Autumn period.

In 583 BCE, Duke Jing of Jin attacked the vassal State of Zhao. Xuanzi's brothers Zhao Tong and Zhao Kuo were killed. Han Jue lamented Zhao's imminent fall. He reasoned with Duke Jing by arguing that Xuanzi served loyally the state of Jin. According to Han Jue, Zhao Shuo had died before the year of 583 BCE. The only remaining successor was Zhao Wu, Zhao Shuo's son.

With the help of Han Jue, Zhao's power was restored and Zhao Wu succeeded his father.
