= Wen of Jin =

Wen of Jin may refer to:

- Marquis Wen of Jin (805–746 BC)
- Duke Wen of Jin (697–628 BC)
- Sima Zhao (211–265), posthumously Emperor Wen of Jin
