= Ji Jiao =

Ji Jiao is the personal name of:

- Duke Jing of Jin (Jiao) (died 434 BC)
- King An of Zhou (died 376 BC)
