= Marquis Cheng =

Marquis Cheng or Marquess Cheng may refer to these ancient Chinese rulers:

- Marquis Cheng of Jin (fl. 9th century BC)
- Marquess Cheng of Zhao (died 350 BC)

== See also ==
- King Cheng (disambiguation)
- Duke Cheng (disambiguation)
