= Ji Guang =

Ji Guang is the personal name of:

- Marquis Ai of Jin (died 709 BC)
- Helü of Wu (died 496 BC)
