= Ji Xie =

Ji Xie is the name of:

- Xiefu (fl. 11th century BC?)
- King Yi of Zhou (Xie) (died 878 BC)
