= Duke Qing =

Duke Qing (Chinese: 頃公; pinyin: Qǐnggōng) may refer to:

- Duke Qing of Qi (died 582 BC)
- Duke Qing of Jin (died 512 BC)
