= Ji Zhi =

Ji Zhi is the personal name of:

- Duke Lie of Jin (died 389 BC)
- King Zhao of Yan (died 279 BC)
