= Xian of Jin =

Xian of Jin may refer to:

- Marquis Xian of Jin (died 812 BC)
- Duke Xian of Jin (died 651 BC)
