= Duke Chu =

Duke Chu may refer to:

- Duke Chu of Wey (died c. 469 BC)
- Duke Chu of Jin (died after 452 BC)
- Duke Chu of Qin
  - Chuzi I (c. 708–698 BC), reigned 703–698 BC
  - Chuzi II (c. 388–385 BC), reigned 386–385 BC
