= Duke Cheng =

Duke Cheng may refer to these rulers from ancient China:

- Duke Cheng of Qi (died 795 BC)
- Duke Cheng of Qin (died 660 BC)
- Duke Cheng of Jin (died 600 BC)
- Duke Cheng of Lu (died 573 BC)

== See also ==
- King Cheng (disambiguation)
- Marquis Cheng (disambiguation)
