= Mu of Jin =

Mu of Jin may refer to:

- Marquis Mu of Jin (died 785 BC)
- Emperor Mu of Jin (343–361)
