= Ji Yu =

Ji Yu is the atonal pinyin romanization of the Mandarin pronunciation of various Chinese names.

It may refer to:

- Ji Yu (姬虞; fl. 1042 BC), better known as Shu Yu of Tang
- Ji Yu (姬圉; d. 637 BC), better known as Duke Huai of Jin
