= Ji Quji =

Ji Quji is the personal name of:

- Duke Qing of Jin (died 512 BC)
- King Ai of Zhou (died 441 BC)
