= Ji Yijiu =

Ji Yijiu is the personal name of:

- Marquis Jing of Jin (died 841 BC)
- King Ping of Zhou (died 720 BC)
