= Ji Yi =

Ji Yi is the personal name of:

- King Jian of Zhou (died 572 BC)
- Duke Zhao of Jin (died 526 BC)
