= Marquis Xiao =

Marquis Xiao may refer to:

- Marquis Xiao of Jin (died 724 BC)
- Cui Lin (died 245), Cao Wei politician, posthumous name Marquis Xiao

== See also ==
- Marquis Xiaozi of Jin (died 705 BC)
