= Duke Ding of Jin =

Chinese state ruler from 511 to 475 BC

Duke Ding of Jin 晉定公

Duke of Jin
- Reign: 511–475 BC
- Predecessor: Duke Qing
- Successor: Duke Chu
- Died: 475 BC
- Issue: Duke Chu
Names
- Ancestral name: Jī (姬); Given name: Wǔ (午)
Posthumous name
- Duke Ding (定公) or Duke Jian (簡公)
- House: Ji
- Dynasty: Jin
- Father: Duke Qing

Duke Ding of Jin (Chinese: 晉定公; pinyin: Jìn Dìng Gōng), personal name Ji Wu, was from 511 BC to 475 BC the duke of the Jin state. He succeeded his father, Duke Qing, and was in turn succeeded by his son, Duke Chu.

== War of the clans ==
After the extermination of the Luan clan by Duke Ding's great-grandfather Duke Ping, the state of Jin had been dominated by the six powerful clans – Fan, Han, Zhao, Wei, Zhonghang, and Zhi. In 497 BC a dispute broke out between Zhao Yang (趙鞅), the leader of the Zhao clan, and the Fan and Zhonghang clans. The Fan and Zhonghang forces attacked Zhao, and the three other clans – Han, Wei, and Zhi – came to Zhao's defence and attacked Fan and Zhonghang, who were defeated and forced to retreat to the city of Zhaoge. Seven years later, in 490 BC the combined Jin forces decisively defeated the Fan and Zhonghang clans, whose leaders Fan Jishe and Zhonghang Yin fled to the State of Qi. From then on Jin would be dominated by the remaining four clans, three of which would partition Jin into the new states of Han, Zhao, and Wei during the reign of Duke Ding's son Duke Chu of Jin.

== Bid for hegemony ==
Despite the civil war, Jin was still one of the most powerful states of China. In 482 BC, the monarchs of many states met at Huangchi (黃池) in the State of Song, where Duke Ding vied with Fuchai, king of the State of Wu, for the title of Hegemon. The outcome was disputed: Zuo Zhuan says Duke Ding won, while Guoyu and Gongyang Zhuan record victory by Fuchai.

== Death and succession ==
Duke Ding reigned for 37 years and died in 475 BC. He was succeeded by his son, Duke Chu of Jin.

Duke Ding of Jin House of Ji Cadet branch of the House of Ji Died: 475 BC
Regnal titles
| Preceded by Duke Qing of Jin | Duke of Jin; 511–475 BC | Succeeded by Duke Chu of Jin |
