= Zhao Dun (Spring and Autumn) =

Zhao dynasty noble

Viscount Xuan of Zhao 趙宣子

Leader of Zhao clan
- Reign: 621–601 BC
- Predecessor: Viscount Cheng
- Successor: Viscount Zhuang
- Died: 601 BC
- Issue: Viscount Zhuang (Zhao Shuo)
Names
- Ancestral name: Yíng (嬴); Lineage name: Zhào (趙); Given name: Dùn (盾)
Posthumous name
- Viscount Xuan (宣子)
- House: Ying
- Father: Viscount Cheng (Zhao Cui)
- Mother: Shu Kui (叔隗) of Qianggaoru (廧咎如)

Zhao Dun (Chinese: 趙盾; pinyin: Zhào Dùn), cognomen (Zhao) Meng 孟, also known by his posthumous name as the Viscount Xuan of Zhao (趙宣子), was a leader of the Zhao clan in the Jin state, where he served as dafu (大夫). He was a son of Zhao Cui (Viscount Cheng), whom he succeeded as clan leader.

== Life ==
Zhao Dun's father Zhao Cui was leader of the Zhao clan in the Jin state, Zhao Dun's mother was a Qianggaoru (廧咎如; A state established by the Chidi people, descendants of the Beidi people) captive.

After Zhao Cui's death, Zhao Dun first appeared in the political theatre of Jin in 621 BCE when Jin army was having a military parade in Yi. Yang Chufu, his father's acquaintance, recommended Dun to the duke of Jin. Later, Dun's power was secured, and the duke entrusted him the regency.

Upon Duke Xiang of Jin's death in the autumn of 621 BCE, Dun installed his young son Yigao as the duke of Jin. Before the installation, Jin's nobles favored Duke Xiang's younger brother Yong. The mother of Yigao, Consort Muying of Qin, feared the possible persecution after Yong's accession. She came to Dun's house and begged him of his support of Yigao. Dun unwillingly accepted her request and made Yigao the next duke of Jin. In this year, Hu Juju of Hu clan (a kin of the Jin duke) executed Yang Chufu because Yang threatened Hu clan's political interests. Dun in turn executed Juju.

In the autumn of 620 BCE, Zhao participated the league of Hu. He represented the state of Jin since the young duke was not able to perform such task. In the same year, he returned some of the lands occupied by Jin to the state of Wey. In the spring of 618 BCE, Chu invaded the state of Zheng, Dun reinforced Zheng with other states.

In 615 BCE, Duke Kang of Qin invaded Jin's Jima. Dun, along with Xun Linfu, Xi Que, Fan Wuxu, and Luan Dun encountered the Qin force in the battle of Hequ. The two sides were not able to best each other and the battle resulted a draw. During the battle of Hequ, a Jin noble named Han Jue was intentionally tested by Zhao Dun, Han proved himself to be an upright person in the battle and Zhao promoted him to the position of Sima(司馬).

When the young duke Yigao grew older, Dun gradually lost his control over him. He tried altering the duke's misbehaviors by remonstrating with him. In 607, duke Ling of Jin attempted to assassinate Zhao Dun but failed. After knowing the duke's intention, Dun fled. His cousin Zhao Chuan killed the duke in a peach plantation while Dun was fleeing. Upon his return to Jin, Dun installed Duke Ling's uncle Heitun as the new duke of Jin.

Zhao Dun died in 601 BCE and was succeeded by his son Zhao Shuo. Not long after his death, the Zhao clan was severely damaged during the disaster of Xiagong.
