= King Cheng =

King Cheng may refer to the following Chinese figures:

- Tang of Shang (c. 1675–1646 BC), also known as King Cheng Tang (成湯王, Chéng Tāng Wáng)
- King Cheng of Zhou (周成王, Zhōu Chéng Wáng; c. 1055–1021 BC)
- King Cheng of Chu (楚成王, Chǔ Chéng Wáng; died 626 BC)
- Qin Shi Huang (259–210 BC), also known as King Cheng of Qin
- Zhang Shicheng (1321–1367), Red Turban rebel leader who called himself King Cheng (or Prince Cheng) of Zhou

== See also ==
- Duke Cheng (disambiguation)
- Marquis Cheng (disambiguation)
