= Shang Shu (Jin) =

Tenth ruler of the state of Jin

Shang Shu of Jin 晉殤叔

Ruler of Jin
- Reign: 785–781 BC
- Predecessor: Marquis Mu
- Successor: Marquis Wen
- Died: 781 BC
Names
- Ancestral name: Jī (姬); Given name: Unknown
Posthumous name
- Shang (殤)
- House: Ji
- Dynasty: Jin
- Father: Marquis Xian

Shang Shu of Jin (Chinese: 晉殤叔; pinyin: Jìn Shāng Shū; lit. 'Uncle Shang of Jin'), personal name unknown, was a ruler of the Jin state. He usurped the throne of Jin after his elder brother, Marquis Mu, died in 785 BC. After Shang Shu ascended the throne, Marquis Mu's son, Ji Chou (Marquis Wen), was forced to leave Jin in fear of his uncle.

In 781 BC, Ji Chou overthrew Shang Shu and ascended the throne as the next Jin monarch.

Shang Shu House of Ji Cadet branch of the House of Ji
Regnal titles
Preceded by Marquis Mu of Jin	Marquis of Jin; 785–781 BC	Succeeded by Marquis Wen of Jin
