= Zhuang Bo of Quwo =

8th-century BC ruler of the state of Quwo

Count Zhuang of Quwo 曲沃莊伯

Ruler of Quwo
- Reign: 731–716 BC
- Predecessor: Huan Shu
- Successor: Duke Wu
- Died: 716 BC
- Issue: Duke Wu
Names
- Ancestral name: Jī (姬); Given name: Shàn (鱔) or Shàn (鱓) or Xiān/Xiǎn (鮮)
Posthumous name
- Count Zhuang (莊伯)
- House: Ji
- Dynasty: Quwo
- Father: Huan Shu

Count Zhuang of Quwo or Earl Zhuang of Quwo (Chinese: 曲沃莊伯; pinyin: Qūwò Zhuāng Bó), personal name Ji Shan, was a ruler of the Quwo (曲沃) state. He was the son of the founding ruler of Quwo, Huan Shu, and half-brother of Viscount Wu of Han, the first leader of the Han clan. Count Zhuang became ruler of Quwo in 731 BC.

In 724 BC, Count Zhuang killed Marquis Xiao of Jin in the capital of Jin, Yi. In response, Jin troops attacked Count Zhuang, forcing him to retreat to Quwo. Marquis E of Jin then ascended to the Jin throne.

According to the Records of the Grand Historian, when Count Zhuang heard the news of the death of Marquis E of Jin in 718 BC, he led troops to attack Jin. King Huan of Zhou ordered the Duke of Guo (虢公) to attack Count Zhuang, resulting in Count Zhuang's retreat to Quwo. The Jin people then supported Marquis E of Jin's son, Marquis Ai of Jin, ascending to the throne of Jin.

The Zuo Zhuan has a different record of the event. It says that Count Zhuang had an alliance with the Zheng and Xing (邢) states and they attacked the Jin capital, Yi. King Huan of Zhou sent troops to assist Count Zhuang. Marquis E of Jin fled to Sui (随). Soon afterwards, Count Zhuang betrayed King Huan of Zhou and attacked him. King Huan of Zhou then sent the Duke of Guo during the autumn of 718 BC to attack Quwo and placed Marquis Ai of Jin on the Jin throne.

In 716 BC, Count Zhuang died and was succeeded by his son, Duke Wu.

Zhuang Bo of Quwo State of Quwo Cadet branch of the House of Ji Died: 716 BC
Regnal titles
Preceded by Huan Shu of Quwo	Ruler of Quwo; 731–716 BC	Succeeded by Duke Wu of Quwo
