= Duke Huan of Jin =

Ruler of the state of Jin from 388 to 369 BC

Duke Huan of Jin 晉桓公

Duke of Jin
- Reign: 388–369 BC
- Predecessor: Duke Lie
- Successor: Duke Jing (disputed)
- Issue: Duke Jing
Names
- Ancestral name: Jī (姬); Given name: Qí (頎)
Posthumous name
- Duke Huan (桓公) or Duke Xiao (孝公)
- House: Ji
- Dynasty: Jin
- Father: Duke Lie

Duke Huan of Jin (Chinese: 晉桓公; pinyin: Jìn Huán Gōng), personal name Ji Qi, was from 388 BC to 369 BC the duke of the Jin state. The Records of the Grand Historian refers to him as Duke Xiao of Jin (晉孝公).

== Final ruler of Jin ==
Duke Huan succeeded his father, Duke Lie of Jin, who died in 389 BC. By then the once powerful state of Jin had been existing in name only, as virtually all of its territory had been partitioned into the states of Han, Zhao, and Wei, founded by the aristocratic clans of Jin. The Bamboo Annals mentions that in the 20th year of Duke Huan's reign (369 BC), Marquess Cheng of Zhao and Marquess Gong of Han moved Duke Huan to Tunliu, and after that there were no more records of Duke Huan or any other Jin ruler. Modern historians such as Yang Kuan, Ch'ien Mu, and Han Zhaoqi consider 369 BC the final year of Duke Huan and the State of Jin.

== Account in Shiji ==
The Records of the Grand Historian (Shiji), on the other hand, says Duke Xiao reigned for 17 years and was succeeded by his son Jujiu. However, Shiji's account of the last rulers of Jin is often self-contradictory, and historians generally regard the Bamboo Annals as more reliable, since it was unearthed from the tomb of King Xiang (died 296 BC) of the State of Wei, one of the three successor states of Jin. Duke Huan is therefore generally considered the final ruler of Jin.

Duke Huan of Jin House of Ji Cadet branch of the House of Ji
Regnal titles
Preceded by Duke Lie of Jin	— TITULAR — Duke of Jin; 388–369 BC	Title abolished
