= Duke Dao of Jin =

Ruler of the state of Jin

Duke Dao of Jin 晉悼公

Duke of Jin
- Reign: 573–558 BC
- Predecessor: Duke Li
- Successor: Duke Ping
- Born: 586 BC
- Died: 558 BC
- Issue: Duke Ping; Ji Yin (姬慭)
Names
- Ancestral name: Jī (姬); Given name: Zhōu (周) or Jiū (糾) or Zhōuzǐ (周子) or Sūnzhōu (孫周)
Posthumous name
- Duke Dao (悼公)
- House: Ji
- Dynasty: Jin
- Father: Ji Tan (姬談)

Duke Dao of Jin (Chinese: 晉悼公; pinyin: Jìn Dào Gōng), personal name Ji Zhou, was from 573 BC to 558 BC the duke of the Jin state.

== Accession to the throne ==
Duke Dao came from a cadet branch of the House of Ji that ruled Jin. His grandfather Jie was one of the younger sons of Duke Xiang of Jin. His father was named Tan, and the family had been exiled at the court of Zhou for three generations.

During the reign of Duke Dao's predecessor Duke Li, the Xi (郤) clan, led by Xi Qi (郤錡), Xi Chou (郤犨), and Xi Zhi (郤至) – together called the three Xis – was one of the most powerful clans that dominated Jin politics. In 573 BC Duke Li struck the Xi clan and killed the three Xis. However, two other clans, the Luan (欒氏) led by Luan Shu (欒書), and the Zhonghang (中行氏) led by Zhonghang Yan (中行偃), staged a coup d'etat and imprisoned Duke Li. The Luan and Zhonghang clans brought back the 14-year-old Duke Dao from the Zhou court, installed him on the throne, and soon afterwards killed Duke Li.

== Reign and succession ==
Duke Dao adopted the policies advocated by his prime minister Wei Jiang (魏絳) and made peace with the Rong and Di tribes on Jin's northern and western borders. On the other hand, in 560 BC he led an alliance of states to invade the State of Qin, defeating Qin at the Xing River. In 558 BC, Duke Dao died and was succeeded by his son Biao, Duke Ping of Jin.

Duke Dao of Jin House of Ji Cadet branch of the House of Ji Born: 586 BC Died: 558 BC
Regnal titles
Preceded by Duke Li of Jin	Duke of Jin; 573–558 BC	Succeeded by Duke Ping of Jin
