= Duke You of Jin =

Chinese state of Jin ruler from 433 to 416 BC

Duke You of Jin 晉幽公

Duke of Jin
- Reign: 433–416 BC
- Predecessor: Duke Jing
- Successor: Duke Lie
- Died: 416 BC
- Issue: Duke Lie
Names
- Ancestral name: Jī (姬); Given name: Liǔ (柳)
Posthumous name
- Duke You (幽公)
- House: Ji
- Dynasty: Jin
- Father: Duke Jing

Duke You of Jin (Chinese: 晉幽公; pinyin: Jìn Yōu Gōng), personal name Ji Liu, was a monarch of the Jin state. He succeeded his father, Duke Jing, who died in 434 BC.

By the time of Duke You's reign, Jin had already been partitioned into three de facto states: Han, Zhao, and Wei. The only remaining territories under Jin's control were the capitals, Jiang and Quwo. While the rulers of Han, Zhao and Wei were nominally vassals of Jin, Duke You had to pay tribute to the former instead.

Duke You reigned for 18 years and died in 416 BC. Marquess Wen of Wei installed Duke You's son, Duke Lie, on the throne of Jin. According to the Records of the Grand Historian, Duke You was killed by bandits when he secretly left the city at night to meet his mistress.

Duke You of Jin House of Ji Cadet branch of the House of Ji Died: 416 BC
Regnal titles
Preceded by Duke Jing of Jin	— TITULAR — Duke of Jin; 433–416 BC	Succeeded by Duke Lie of Jin
