= Duke Xiao =

Duke Xiao may refer to these rulers from ancient China:

- Duke Xiao of Chen (fl. 10th century BC)
- Duke Xiao of Qi (died 633 BC)
- Duke Xiao of Qin (381–338 BC)
