= Marquis Xiao of Jin =

8th-century BC ruler of the state of Jin

Marquis Xiao of Jin 晉孝侯

Marquis of Jin
- Reign: 739–724 BC
- Predecessor: Marquis Zhao
- Successor: Ji Xi
- Died: 724 BC
Names
- Ancestral name: Jī (姬); Given name: Píng (平)
Posthumous name
- Marquis Xiao (孝侯)
- House: Ji
- Dynasty: Jin
- Father: Marquis Zhao

Marquis Xiao of Jin (Chinese: 晉孝侯; pinyin: Jìn Xiào Hóu), personal name Ji Ping, was a monarch of the Jin state.

In 739 BC, Jin official Panfu murdered Marquis Zhao (Marquis Xiao's father) and attempted to place Huan Shu of Quwo on the Jin throne. Huan Shu of Quwo was met with resistance from the Jin people and returned back to Quwo. Then, the Jin people supported Marquis Xiao to take over as the next Jin marquis. After Marquis Xiao ascended the throne, he killed Panfu in revenge for him killing his father.

In 724 BC, the son of Huan Shu of Quwo, Count Zhuang of Quwo, murdered Marquis Xiao while in the capital of Jin, Yi (翼). In response, Jin troops attacked Count Zhuang, resulting in his retreat back to Quwo. The Jin people then supported Marquis Xiao's younger brother, Ji Xi, to be the next Jin ruler.

Marquis Xiao of Jin House of Ji Cadet branch of the House of Ji Died: 724 BC
Regnal titles
| Preceded by Marquis Zhao of Jin | Marquis of Jin; 739–724 BC | Succeeded by Marquis E of Jin |
