= Marquis Li of Jin =

Ruler of the State of Jin

Marquis Li of Jin 晉厲侯

Marquis of Jin
- Reign: ?–859 BC
- Predecessor: Marquis Cheng
- Successor: Marquis Jing
- Died: 859 BC
- Issue: Marquis Jing
Names
- Ancestral name: Jī (姬); Given name: Fú (福) or Bómǎ (僰馬)
Posthumous name
- Marquis Li (厲侯)
- House: Ji
- Dynasty: Jin
- Father: Marquis Cheng

Marquis Li of Jin (Chinese: 晉厲侯; pinyin: Jìn Lì Hóu), personal name Ji Fu, was a monarch of the Jin state. He succeeded his father, Marquis Cheng, to the Jin throne.

In 1992, an ancient tomb dating back to the Zhou dynasty was discovered in Quwo County, Shanxi. One of the tombs was marked as the tomb of Marquis Li of Jin. Quwo County is known to be the site of the ancient capital of the state of Jin.

Marquis Li was succeeded by his son, Marquis Jing.

Marquis Li of Jin House of Ji Cadet branch of the House of Ji Died: 859 BC
Chinese nobility
Preceded by Marquis Cheng of Jin	Marquis of Jin ?–859 BC	Succeeded by Marquis Jing of Jin
