= Min, Marquis of Jin =

Ruler of the State of Jin

Ji Min 姬緡

Ruler of Jin
- Reign: 704–678 BC
- Predecessor: Marquis Xiaozi
- Successor: Duke Wu
- Died: 678 BC
Names
- Ancestral name: Jī (姬); Given name: Mín (緡)
- House: Ji
- Dynasty: Jin
- Father: Ji Xi

Ji Min, commonly known as "Min, Marquis of Jin" (Chinese: 晉侯緡; pinyin: Jìn Hóu Mín, died 678 BC), was a marquis of the Jin. He was the last Jin monarch from the original line of the ruling Ji clan before the throne was taken over by the branch from Quwo. He reigned for 27 years.

In 678 BC, Duke Wu of Quwo attacked and conquered Jin. Duke Wu of Quwo offered gifts to King Xi of Zhou, who in turn made Duke Wu of Quwo the next ruler of Jin.

Min, Marquis of Jin House of Ji Cadet branch of the House of Ji Died: 678 BC
Regnal titles
Preceded by Marquis Xiaozi of Jin	Marquis of Jin; 704–678 BC	Succeeded by Duke Wu of Jin as Duke of Jin
