= Marquis E of Jin =

8th-century BC marquis of Jin

Ji Xi 姬郄

Marquis of Jin
- Reign: 724–718 BC
- Predecessor: Marquis Xiao
- Successor: Marquis Ai
- Died: 718 BC
- Issue: Marquis Ai; Ji Min
Names
- Ancestral name: Jī (姬); Given name: Xì (郄) or Dū/Dōu (都)
- House: Ji
- Dynasty: Jin
- Father: Marquis Xiao

Ji Xi (Chinese: 姬郄), commonly known as Marquis E of Jin (Chinese: 晉鄂侯; pinyin: Jìn È Hóu), was a marquis of the Jin state. He reigned for six years from 724 BC to 718 BC.

According to the Records of the Grand Historian, when Count Zhuang of Quwo heard the news of the death of Marquis E, he brought troops to attack Jin. King Huan of Zhou ordered the Duke of Guo (虢公) to attack Count Zhuang of Quwo, resulting in Count Zhuang of Quwo's retreat to Quwo. The Jin people then supported Marquis E's son, Marquis Ai, to take the throne of Jin.

The Zuo Zhuan has a different record of the event. It says that Count Zhuang of Quwo had an alliance with the Zheng and Xing (邢) states and they attacked Yi (翼), the capital of Jin. King Huan of Zhou sent troops to help Count Zhuang of Quwo. Marquis E fled to Sui (随). Soon afterwards Count Zhuang of Quwo betrayed King Huan of Zhou and attacked him. King Huan of Zhou then sent the Duke of Guo during the autumn of that year to attack Quwo and placed Marquis Ai on the Jin throne. Marquis E was so named as Jin official Jiafu (嘉父) later relocated Marquis E from Sui to the land of E (鄂).

== Notes ==
Marquis E of Jin House of Ji Cadet branch of the House of Ji Died: 718 BC
Regnal titles
Preceded by Marquis Xiao of Jin	Marquis of Jin; 724–718 BC	Succeeded by Marquis Ai of Jin
