= Huan Shu of Quwo =

First ruler of the state of Quwo from 745 to 731 BC

Huan Shu of Quwo 曲沃桓叔

Ruler of Quwo
- Reign: 745–731 BC
- Predecessor: None (Dynasty established)
- Successor: Count Zhuang
- Born: 802 BC
- Died: 731 BC
- Issue: Count Zhuang of Quwo; Viscount Wu of Han
Names
- Ancestral name: Jī (姬); Given name: Chéngshī (成師)
Posthumous name
- Huan (桓)
- House: Ji
- Dynasty: Quwo
- Father: Marquis Mu of Jin

Huan Shu of Quwo (Chinese: 曲沃桓叔; pinyin: Qūwò Huán Shū; lit. 'Uncle Huan of Quwo'; 802–731 BC), personal name Ji Chengshi, was the first ruler of the Quwo (曲沃) state, a fief of the Jin state. He was a son of Marquis Mu of Jin and the younger brother of Marquis Wen of Jin. He was also uncle of Marquis Zhao of Jin, who granted him the land of Quwo.

In 745 BC, Marquis Zhao of Jin enfeoffed Huan Shu at Quwo (around modern-day Quwo County, Shanxi). He was said to be a benevolent ruler beloved by the people of Quwo.

In 739 BC, Jin official Panfu (潘父) murdered Marquis Zhao of Jin and invited Huan Shu to ascend the throne of Jin. However, Huan Shu was defeated by Jin troops and retreated to Quwo.

In 731 BC, Huan Shu died and was succeeded by his son and heir, Count Zhuang of Quwo, to the Quwo throne. Another son of Huan Shu, Viscount Wu of Han, became the progenitor of the ruling house of the Han state.

Huan Shu of Quwo State of Quwo Cadet branch of the House of Ji Born: 802 BC Died: 731 BC
Regnal titles
| New title | Ruler of Quwo; 745–731 BC | Succeeded by Count Zhuang of Quwo |
