= Marquis Xi of Jin =

Marquis Xi of Jin 晉釐侯

Marquis of Jin
- Reign: 841–823 BC
- Predecessor: Marquis Jing
- Successor: Marquis Xian
- Died: 823 BC
- Issue: Marquis Xian
Names
- Ancestral name: Jī (姬); Given name: Sītú (司徒)
Posthumous name
- Marquis Xi (釐侯 or 僖侯)
- House: Ji
- Dynasty: Jin
- Father: Marquis Jing

Marquis Xi of Jin, personal name Ji Situ, was a ruler of the Jin state. He succeeded his father, Marquis Jing, to the Jin throne. He was later succeeded by his son, Marquis Xian.

Marquis Xi of Jin House of Ji Cadet branch of the House of Ji Died: 823 BC
Chinese nobility
Preceded by Marquis Jing of Jin	Marquis of Jin; 841–823 BC	Succeeded by Marquis Xian of Jin
