= Marquis Zhao of Jin =

Ruler of the state of Jin from 745 to 739 BC

Marquis Zhao of Jin 晉昭侯

Marquis of Jin
- Reign: 745–739 BC
- Predecessor: Marquis Wen
- Successor: Marquis Xiao
- Died: 739 BC
- Issue: Marquis Xiao
Names
- Ancestral name: Jī (姬); Given name: Bó (伯)
Posthumous name
- Marquis Zhao (昭侯)
- House: Ji
- Dynasty: Jin
- Father: Marquis Wen

Marquis Zhao of Jin (Chinese: 晉昭侯; pinyin: Jìn Zhāo Hóu), personal name Ji Bo, was a ruler of the Jin state. He was the son of Marquis Wen of Jin.

In 745 BC, he granted Quwo (modern-day Quwo County, Shanxi) to his uncle, Huan Shu of Quwo.

In 739 BC, Jin official Panfu (潘父) murdered Marquis Zhao and attempted to place Huan Shu of Quwo on the throne of Jin. When Huan Shu of Quwo arrived in Jin, he was met with resistance from the common people; Huan Shu of Quwo then retreated back to Quwo. The Jin people enthroned Marquis Zhao's son, Marquis Xiao, as the next Jin ruler.

Marquis Zhao of Jin House of Ji Cadet branch of the House of Ji Died: 739 BC
Regnal titles
Preceded by Marquis Wen of Jin	Marquis of Jin; 745–739 BC	Succeeded by Marquis Xiao of Jin
