= Duke Chu of Jin =

Ruler of Jin, China from 474 to 452 BC

Duke Chu of Jin 晉出公

Duke of Jin
- Reign: 474–452 BC
- Predecessor: Duke Ding
- Successor: Duke Jing
- Died: 452 BC
Names
- Ancestral name: Jī (姬); Given name: Záo (鑿)
Posthumous name
- Duke Chu (出公)
- House: Ji
- Dynasty: Jin
- Father: Duke Ding

Duke Chu of Jin (Chinese: 晉出公; pinyin: Jìn Chū Gōng), personal name Ji Zao, was a duke of the Jin state. He succeeded his father, Duke Ding, to the throne in 474 BC.

In 453 BC, the Zhi (智) clan was exterminated by the noble houses of Han (韓), Zhao (趙) and Wei (魏) in the Battle of Jinyang. A furious Duke Chu decided to launch a punitive attack on the Han, Zhao and Wei clans, but was instead forced to flee the Jin state. He died on the way to the Qi state. The three clans then installed Duke Jing as the next Jin ruler.

== Rise of the Zhi clan ==
The state of Jin had long been dominated by aristocratic clans. During the reign of Duke Chu's father Duke Ding, the six major clans fought a civil war, and in 490 BC the Fan and Zhonghang clans were defeated. In 458 BC, the remaining four clans – Zhi, Han, Zhao, and Wei – divided up the former territory of Fan and Zhonghang amongst themselves, and the Zhi clan, under the leadership of Zhi Yao (知瑤), became the most powerful of the four. Zhi even invaded the state of Zhongshan, annexing Qiongyu (in present-day Yi County, Hebei).

== Partition of Jin ==
In 455 BC, Zhi Yao demanded that the three other clans cede territory to the Zhi clan. The Han and Wei clans complied, but Zhao Xiangzi, the leader of the Zhao clan, refused. To punish his defiance, Zhi Yao led the forces of Zhi, Han, and Wei to attack Zhao, besieging the Zhao capital Jinyang. After enduring two years of siege, Zhao Xiangzi secretly sent an envoy to negotiate with Han and Wei, persuading them to switch sides. In 453 BC, Zhao, Han, and Wei launched a coordinated counterattack, defeating the Zhi force and killing Zhi Yao. After annihilating the Zhi clan, they divided the territory of Zhi among themselves. The three clans had by this time become separate states while the Duke of Jin was reduced to a mere figurehead. This was a watershed event in Chinese history that is often considered the start of the Warring States period.

The following year, Duke Chu of Jin fled to the State of Chu. Zhao, Han, and Wei, now effectively in control of Jin, installed Jiao, a great-grandson of Duke Zhao of Jin, as the titular ruler of Jin. Jiao was later known as Duke Jing of Jin.

Duke Chu of Jin House of Ji Cadet branch of the House of Ji
Regnal titles
Preceded by Duke Ding of Jin	Duke of Jin; 474–452 BC	Succeeded by Duke Jing of Jin
