= Marquis Wu of Jin =

Ruler of the State of Jin

Marquis Wu of Jin 晉武侯

Marquis of Jin
- Predecessor: Ji Xiefu
- Successor: Marquis Cheng
- Issue: Marquis Cheng
Names
- Ancestral name: Jī (姬); Given name: Níngzú (寧族)
Posthumous name
- Marquis Wu (武侯)
- House: Ji
- Dynasty: Jin
- Father: Ji Xiefu

Marquis Wu of Jin (Chinese: 晉武侯; pinyin: Jìn Wǔ Hóu), personal name Ji Ningzu, was a ruler of the Jin state. He succeeded his father, Ji Xiefu, to the throne. He was in turn succeeded by his son, Marquis Cheng.

Marquis Wu of Jin House of Ji Cadet branch of the House of Ji
Chinese nobility
Preceded by Xie, Marquis of Jin	Marquis of Jin	Succeeded by Marquis Cheng of Jin
