= Marquis Mu of Jin =

Ninth ruler of the state of Jin

Marquis Mu of Jin 晉穆侯

Marquis of Jin
- Reign: 812–785 BC
- Predecessor: Marquis Xian
- Successor: Shang Shu
- Died: 785 BC
- Issue: Marquis Wen of Jin; Huan Shu of Quwo
Names
- Ancestral name: Jī (姬); Given name: Fèiwáng (費王) or Fúshēng (弗生) or Xīwáng (晞王) or Fèirén (費壬)
Posthumous name
- Marquis Mu (穆侯)
- House: Ji
- Dynasty: Jin
- Father: Marquis Xian

Marquis Mu of Jin (Chinese: 晉穆侯; pinyin: Jìn Mù Hóu), personal name Ji Feiwang, was a monarch of the Jin state. He succeeded his father, Marquis Xian, to the throne of Jin.

In 808 BC, Marquis Mu married a woman from the royal family of Qi to be one of his concubines. In 805 BC, he battled the Tiaorong (條戎) tribe. During this time, his eldest son, Ji Chou (Marquis Wen of Jin), was born.

In 802 BC, after emerging victorious in a battle against the Qianmu (千畝) tribe, his other son, Ji Chengshi (Huan Shu of Quwo), was born.

Marquis Mu reigned for 27 years, from the 17th to the 43rd year under the rule of King Xuan of Zhou. He tried to make the old Jin city of Jiang into a capital, but it was largely abandoned in favour of an area named Houma called Xintian.

After he died in 785 BC, his younger brother, Shang Shu, usurped the throne. His son, Ji Chou, was forced to leave Jin.

Marquis Mu of Jin House of Ji Cadet branch of the House of Ji Died: 785 BC
Regnal titles
Preceded by Marquis Xian of Jin	Marquis of Jin; 812–785 BC	Succeeded by Shang Shu
