= Duke Ling of Jin =

Ruler of the state of Jin

Duke Ling of Jin 晉靈公

Duke of Jin
- Reign: 620–607 BC
- Predecessor: Duke Xiang
- Successor: Duke Cheng
- Regent: Zhao Dun (Viscount Xuan of Zhao)
- Died: 19 August 607 BC
Names
- Ancestral name: Jī (姬); Given name: Yígāo (夷皋)
Posthumous name
- Duke Ling (靈公)
- House: Ji
- Dynasty: Jin
- Father: Duke Xiang
- Mother: Mu Ying (穆嬴)

Duke Ling of Jin (Chinese: 晉靈公; pinyin: Jìn Líng Gōng), personal name Ji Yigao, was from 620 to 607 BC the duke of the Jin state. He ascended the throne with the support of his regent, Zhao Dun (Viscount Xuan of Zhao).

In 607 BC, 14 years after ascending the throne, Duke Ling had reached adulthood and become increasingly despotic. He was known to have had his chef killed for not cooking his bear paws well. Zhao Dun, who enjoyed a reputation for integrity and incorruptibility, tried to stop him. Resentful of Zhao Dun's influence, Duke Ling tried to have Zhao Dun assassinated. Zhao Dun managed to escape, and on 19 August, his half-brother Zhao Chuan (趙穿) rebelled and killed Duke Ling. Zhao Dun and Zhao Chuan then installed Duke Ling's uncle, Duke Cheng, on the throne of Jin.

Duke Ling of Jin House of Ji Cadet branch of the House of Ji Died: 607 BC
Regnal titles
Preceded by Duke Xiang of Jin	Duke of Jin; 620–607 BC	Succeeded by Duke Cheng of Jin
