= Duke Jing of Jin (Jujiu) =

Duke of Jin

Duke Jing of Jin 晉靜公

Duke of Jin
- Reign: 356–349 BC
- Predecessor: Duke Huan
- Successor: None (Dynasty collapsed)
Names
- Ancestral name: Jī (姬); Given name: Jùjiǔ (俱酒)
Posthumous name
- Duke Jing (靜公) or Duke Jing (靖公) or Duke Dao (悼公)
- House: Ji
- Dynasty: Jin
- Father: Duke Huan

Duke Jing of Jin (Chinese: 晉靜公; pinyin: Jìn Jìng Gōng), personal name Ji Jujiu, was the supposed last ruler of the Jin state, according to the Records of the Grand Historian. He succeeded his father, Duke Huan, and was eventually overthrown by the states of Han, Zhao, and Wei that were founded by former aristocratic clans of Jin.

However, the Records of the Grand Historian account of the last rulers of Jin is often self-contradictory, and is further contradicted by the Bamboo Annals, which does not mention any Jin ruler after Duke Huan. Historians such as Yang Kuan, Ch'ien Mu, and Han Zhaoqi generally regard the Bamboo Annals as more reliable, since it was unearthed from the tomb of King Xiang of Wei. Duke Huan is therefore generally considered the final ruler of Jin, and the historicity of Duke Jing has been cast in doubt.

== See also ==
- Partition of Jin
