= Duke Li of Jin =

Ruler of the state of Jin

Duke Li of Jin 晉厲公

Duke of Jin
- Reign: 580–573 BC
- Predecessor: Duke Jing
- Successor: Duke Dao
- Died: 573 BC
Names
- Ancestral name: Jī (姬); Given name: Zhōupú (州蒲) or Shòumàn (壽曼)
Posthumous name
- Duke Li (厲公)
- House: Ji
- Dynasty: Jin
- Father: Duke Jing

Duke Li of Jin (Chinese: 晉厲公; pinyin: Jìn Lì Gōng), personal name Ji Zhoupu or Ji Shouman, was a duke of the Jin state. Duke Li succeeded his father, Duke Jing, who abdicated after falling ill in the summer of 581 BC. Duke Jing died a month later.

== Battle of Masui ==
In 580 BC, the first year of his reign, Duke Li made an alliance with Duke Huan of the State of Qin. The alliance did not last, however, as Jin attacked Qin two years later and defeated Qin at Masui (麻隧).

== Battle of Yanling ==
Duke Li fought and won one of the most significant battles of the Spring and Autumn period, the Battle of Yanling, against Jin's archrival, the State of Chu. In 577 BC, the Jin vassal state Zheng attacked the Chu vassal state Xu (許). The next year Chu attacked Zheng in revenge, and forced Zheng to switch its loyalty to Chu. Zheng then attacked Song, another Jin vassal state. In 575 BC, Duke Li raised an army to attack Zheng, while King Gong of Chu led the Chu army north to defend his new ally.

The two forces met at Yanling, and Jin defeated Chu by attacking its weaker flanks manned by the poorly trained Zheng and Dongyi soldiers. During the battle King Gong was shot in the eye by an arrow. Despite his wound, at the end of the day King Gong summoned the chief military commander Zifan to discuss the battle plan for the next day, but caught Zifan drunk. King Gong decided to retreat and Zifan later committed suicide.

== Struggle against the clans ==
Although Jin regained its status as the leader of the Spring and Autumn states by defeating Chu, it would soon be riven by internal strife that would eventually lead to its partition into the new states of Han, Zhao, and Wei. During the reign of Duke Li the Xi (郤) clan, led by Xi Qi (郤錡), Xi Chou (郤犨), and Xi Zhi (郤至) – together called the three Xis – was one of the most powerful clans that dominated Jin politics. In 573 BC Duke Li struck the Xi clan and killed the three Xis. However, two other clans, the Luan (欒氏) led by Luan Shu (欒書), and the Zhonghang (中行氏) led by Zhonghang Yan (中行偃), staged a coup d'etat and imprisoned Duke Li. The Luan and Zhonghang clans installed Zhou, a prince from a cadet branch of the ruling House of Ji, on the Jin throne. Zhou would later be known as Duke Dao of Jin. Duke Li was killed soon afterwards.

Duke Li of Jin House of Ji Cadet branch of the House of Ji Died: 573 BC
Regnal titles
Preceded by Duke Jing of Jin	Duke of Jin; 580–573 BC	Succeeded by Duke Dao of Jin
