= Jing of Zhou =

Jing of Zhou may refer to:

- King Jing of Zhou (Gui) (周景王; died 520 BC), the 24th king of the Chinese Zhou Dynasty, the 12th of Eastern Zhou (r.544-520 BC)
- King Jing of Zhou (Gai) (周敬王; died 477 BC), the 26th king of the Chinese Zhou Dynasty, the 14th of Eastern Zhou (r.519-477 BC)
- Emperor Jing of Zhou (573–581), emperor of the Northern Zhou dynasty
