= Duke Lie of Jin =

Ruler of the state of Jin from 415 to 389 BC

Duke Lie of Jin 晉烈公

Duke of Jin
- Reign: 415–389 BC
- Predecessor: Duke You
- Successor: Duke Huan
- Died: 389 BC
- Issue: Duke Huan; Ji Xi (姬喜)
Names
- Ancestral name: Jī (姬); Given name: Zhǐ (止)
Posthumous name
- Duke Lie (烈公)
- House: Ji
- Dynasty: Jin
- Father: Duke You

Duke Lie of Jin (Chinese: 晉烈公; pinyin: Jìn Liè Gōng), personal name Ji Zhi, was a duke of the Jin state.After his father Duke You died in 416 BC, Marquess Wen of Wei installed Duke Lie on the Jin throne.

Since 453 BC, Jin had already been partitioned into three de facto states: Han, Zhao, and Wei. The only territories under Jin's control were the capitals, Jiang and Quwo. In 403 BC, during Duke Lie's reign, King Weilie of Zhou officially proclaimed the rulers of Han, Zhao, and Wei zhuhou.

Duke Lie reigned for 27 years. He died in 389 BC and was succeeded by his son, Duke Huan.

Duke Lie of Jin House of Ji Cadet branch of the House of Ji Died: 389 BC
Regnal titles
Preceded by Duke You of Jin	— TITULAR — Duke of Jin; 415–389 BC	Succeeded by Duke Huan of Jin
