= Xiefu =

Second ruler of the state of Jin

Ji Xiefu 姬燮父
- Marquis of Jin

Ruler of Jin
- Predecessor: Ji Yu
- Successor: Marquis Wu
- Issue: Marquis Wu
Names
- Ancestral name: Jī (姬); Given name: Xièfù (燮父) or Xiè (燮)
- House: Ji
- Dynasty: Jin
- Father: Ji Yu

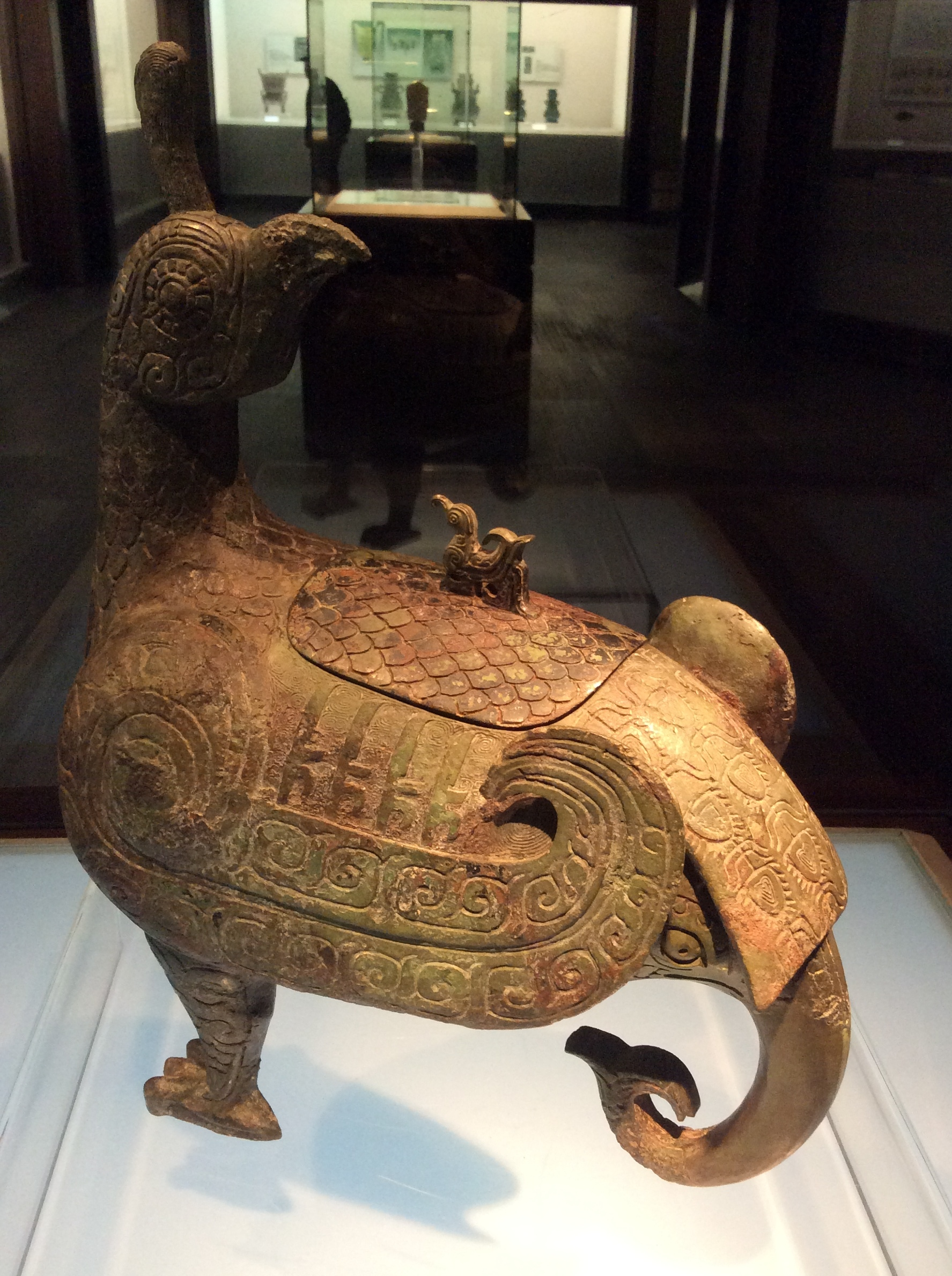
This zun with a bird and elephant hybrid design once belonged to Xiefu. This is an exhibit of the Shanxi Museum.

Ji Xiefu or Ji Xie, commonly known as "Xie, Marquis of Jin" (Chinese: 晉侯燮; pinyin: Jìn Hóu Xiè), was a ruler of the Jin state.

Xiefu succeeded his father, Ji Yu, as the ruler of the state of Tang. During his reign, he moved the capital from Tang (唐) to Jin (晉) and renamed the state "Jin".

After Xiefu died, he was succeeded by his son, Marquis Wu.

Xie, Marquis of Jin House of Ji Cadet branch of the House of Ji
Regnal titles
Preceded by Shu Yu of Tang as Marquis of Tang	Marquis of Jin	Succeeded by Marquis Wu of Jin
