= Shu Yu of Tang =

Ji Yu 姬虞

Ruler of the Tang state
- Reign: 1042 BC–?
- Predecessor: None
- Successor: Ji Xie (as ruler of Jin)
Names
- Ancestral name: Jī (姬); Given name: Yú (虞); Courtesy name: Zǐyú (子於)
- House: Ji
- Dynasty: Tang
- Father: King Wu of Zhou

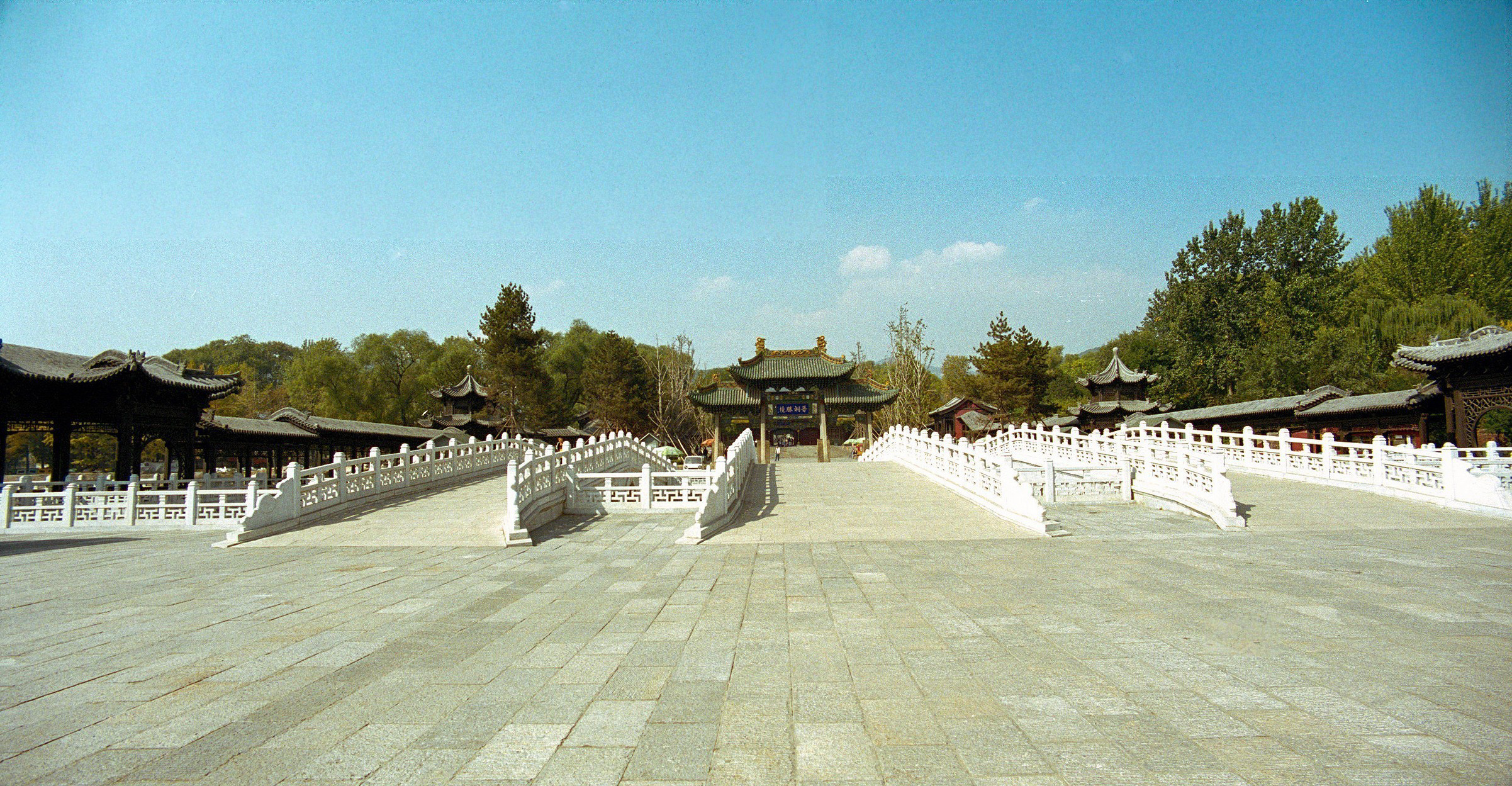
The Shrine of Jin dedicated to Shu Yu

Ji Yu, commonly known as "Yu, [Royal] Uncle of Tang" (Chinese: 唐叔虞; pinyin: Táng Shū Yú), was the founder of the Tang state (later renamed "Jin" by his son and successor, Ji Xie). He was a son of King Wu of Zhou and Yi Jiang and the younger brother of King Cheng of Zhou. He was accorded the fief of Tang by King Cheng of Zhou.

== Personal life ==
Shortly after the establishment of the Zhou Dynasty, King Wu of Zhou died. His son, Prince Song, ascended the throne and became King Cheng of Zhou. Since he was very young and too inexperienced to run the newly founded dynasty, his uncle, the Duke of Zhou, served as regent and handled all political affairs until King Cheng of Zhou became old enough to rule. In the year that King Cheng of Zhou ascended the throne, the people of a land called Tang (唐) rebelled, so the Duke of Zhou conquered them.

According to the Records of the Grand Historian, one day, King Cheng of Zhou was playing with his younger brother, Prince Yu. King Cheng of Zhou suddenly picked up a parasol tree leaf and gave it to Prince Yu. Then he said playfully," Let this be a proof that I will make you a feudal lord." Prince Yu happily got the leaf and he then told this to the Duke of Zhou. The Duke of Zhou thought that whatever the young King Cheng of Zhou said should not be taken lightly since he was the king.

The Duke of Zhou approached the young king and asked him if it were true. The young king said that he was just joking with his brother. Then the Duke of Zhou replied, "A sovereign must not joke about the things he says and do as what he has said." The young king thought it was reasonable and gave the recent conquered land called Tang, west of modern Yicheng County in Shanxi, to his brother, Prince Yu.

Shu Yu's son and successor, Xie, moved the capital Jiang nearer to the Jin River and renamed the state Jin.

== Worship ==
Jinci was a shrine in Taiyuan dedicated to Shu Yu. It is a major historical and cultural site protected at the national level in People's republic of China.

== See also ==
1. Family tree of ancient Chinese emperors

Shu Yu of Tang House of Ji Cadet branch of the House of Ji
Chinese nobility
New creation	Marquis of Tang; 1042–? BC	Succeeded by Xie, Marquis of Jin
