= Marquis Xiaozi of Jin =

Ruler of the state of Jin

Marquis Xiaozi of Jin 晉小子侯

Marquis of Jin
- Reign: 708–705 BC
- Predecessor: Marquis Ai
- Successor: Ji Min
- Died: 705 BC
Names
- Ancestral name: Jī (姬); Given name: Unknown
- House: Ji
- Dynasty: Jin
- Father: Marquis Ai

Marquis Xiaozi of Jin (Chinese: 晉小子侯; pinyin: Jìn Xiǎozǐ Hóu), given name unknown, was a ruler of the Jin state. He reigned for four years from 708 BC to 705 BC.

In 705 BC, Duke Wu of Quwo killed Marquis Xiaozi. King Huan of Zhou sent Guo Zhong (虢仲) to attack Duke Wu of Quwo, and Duke Wu retreated to Quwo. King Huan of Zhou then installed Ji Min, the uncle of Marquis Xiaozi, on the throne of Jin.

Marquis Xiaozi of Jin House of Ji Cadet branch of the House of Ji Died: 705 BC
Regnal titles
Preceded by Marquis Ai of Jin	Marquis of Jin; 708–705 BC	Succeeded by Min, Marquis of Jin
