= Duke Wu of Jin =

Ruler of the states of Quwo and Jin

Duke Wu of Jin 晉武公

Ruler of Jin
- Reign: 679–677 BC
- Predecessor: Ji Min
- Successor: Duke Xian of Jin

Ruler of Quwo
- Reign: 716–679 BC
- Predecessor: Count Zhuang of Quwo
- Successor: None (Merged into Jin)
- Died: 677 BC
- Issue: Duke Xian of Jin; Ji Boqiao (姬伯僑)
Names
- Ancestral name: Jī (姬); Given name: Chēng (稱)
Posthumous name
- Duke Wu (武公)
- House: Ji
- Dynasty: Quwo (716–679 BC); Jin (679–677 BC)
- Father: Count Zhuang of Quwo

Duke Wu of Jin (Chinese: 晉武公; pinyin: Jìn Wǔ Gōng), personal name Ji Cheng, also known as Duke Wu of Quwo (Chinese: 曲沃武公; pinyin: Qūwò Wǔ Gōng), was the last ruler of the Quwo (曲沃) state who later became a ruler of the Jin state.

== Reign in Quwo ==
In 716 BC, Count Zhuang of Quwo died and his son Cheng ascended the throne of Quwo.

In 710 BC, the eighth year of the reign of Marquis Ai of Jin, Marquis Ai of Jin invades a small state south of Jin called Xingting (陘廷). Xingting then made an alliance with Duke Wu of Quwo. In the spring of 709 BC, they attacked Yi (翼), the capital of Jin. Then, he stayed in Xingting for a while. Then, he ordered his half uncle, Han Wan, to ride a chariot with Liang Hong (梁弘) by his right and chase Marquis Ai of Jin who escaped from Yi. They chased him around the bank of the Fen River (汾水) and at that night, they managed to capture Marquis Ai of Jin. The Jin people asked the son of Marquis Ai of Jin, to become the next ruler of Jin and he became Marquis Xiaozi of Jin. In 709 BC, the first year of the reign of Marquis Xiaozi of Jin, Duke Wu of Quwo ordered Han Wan to kill Marquis Ai of Jin.

According to the Records of the Grand Historian, in 706 BC, the fourth year of the reign of Marquis Xiaozi of Jin, Duke Wu of Quwo killed Marquis Xiaozi of Jin. King Huan of Zhou sent Guo Zhong (虢仲) to attack Duke Wu of Quwo so he went back to Quwo. Meanwhile, King Huan of Zhou put the uncle of Marquis Xiaozi of Jin, into the throne of Jin and he became Marquis Min of Jin.

According to the Zuo Zhuan, Duke Wu of Quwo killed Marquis Xiaozi of Jin on the winter of the seventh year of the reign of Duke Huan of Qi which was 705. The year after, King Huan of Zhou sent Guo Zhong (虢仲) to put Marquis Xiaozi of Jin into the throne and he became Marquis Min of Jin. Quwo failed to annex the state of Jin in this event.

In 678 BC, in the 28th year of the reign of Marquis Min of Jin, Duke Wu of Quwo attacked and conquered Jin. Duke Wu of Quwo offered gifts to King Xi of Zhou. In the seventh year of the reign of Duke Zhuang Lu which is 677 BC, King Xi of Zhou appointed Cheng the ruler of Jin and gave him the title of Duke.

== Reign in Jin ==
Not long after Duke Wu of Jin received the title he invaded the Eastern Zhou and killed Guizhu (詭諸), one of its court officials. The official who held the power in the Eastern Zhou court, Jifu (忌父), escaped to the Western Guo.

Duke Wu of Jin died two years after he received the title of Duke of Jin.

The Sui dynasty Emperors were from the northwest military aristocracy, and emphasized that their patrilineal ancestry was ethnic Han, claiming descent from the Han official Yang Zhen. and the New Book of Tang traced his patrilineal ancestry to the Zhou dynasty kings via Ji Boqiao 姬伯僑, who was the son of Duke Wu of Jin. Ji Boqiao's family became known as the Yangshe clan (羊舌氏).

The Yang of Hongnong 弘農楊氏 were asserted as ancestors by the Sui Emperors like the Longxi Li's were asserted as ancestors of the Tang Emperors. The Li of Zhaojun and the Lu of Fanyang hailed from Shandong and were related to the Liu clan which was also linked to the Yang of Hongnong and other clans of Guanlong. Duke Wu of Jin was claimed as the ancestors of the Hongnong Yang.

The Yang of Hongnong, Jia of Hedong, Xiang of Henei, and Wang of Taiyuan from the Tang dynasty were claimed as ancestors by Song dynasty lineages.

There were Dukedoms for the offspring of the royal families of the Zhou dynasty, Sui dynasty, and Tang dynasty in the Later Jin (Five Dynasties).

Duke Wu of Jin House of Ji Cadet branch of the House of Ji Died: 677 BC
Regnal titles
Preceded by Zhuang Bo of Quwo	Ruler of Quwo; 716–679 BC	Merged into Jin
Preceded by Min as Marquis of Jin	Duke of Jin; 678–677 BC	Succeeded by Duke Xian of Jin
