= Jin (Chinese state) =

State in modern Shanxi (1042–369 BC)

Jin 晉
- 11th century BC–369 BC
- Jin in 5th century BC China
- Status: Marquisate
- Capital: Tang (唐); Quwo (曲沃); Jiang (絳); Xintian (新田)
- Common languages: Old Chinese
- Religion: Taoism, Animism, Ancestor veneration
- Government: Monarchy
- Historical era: Ancient
  - Established: 11th century BC
  - Disestablished: 369 BC
- Currency: Spade money
Preceded by
Zhou dynasty
Succeeded by
Han (Warring States)
Zhao (state)
Wei (state)

Jin
- "Jin" in seal script (top), Traditional (middle), and Simplified (bottom) Chinese characters
- Traditional Chinese: 晉
- Simplified Chinese: 晋
Transcriptions
Standard Mandarin
- Hanyu Pinyin: Jìn
- Gwoyeu Romatzyh: Jinn
- Wade–Giles: Chin^{4}
- IPA: [tɕîn]
Wu
- Suzhounese: Tsin^{5}
Yue: Cantonese
- Yale Romanization: Jeun
- Jyutping: Zeon^{3}
- IPA: [tsɵn˧]
Southern Min
- Hokkien POJ: Chìn
- Tâi-lô: Tsìn
Middle Chinese
- Middle Chinese: Tsìn
Old Chinese
- Baxter–Sagart (2014): *tsi[n]-s

Jin (traditional Chinese: 晉; simplified Chinese: 晋, Old Chinese: *tsi[n]-s), originally known as Tang (唐), was a major state during the middle part of the Zhou dynasty, based near the centre of what was then China, on the lands attributed to the legendary Xia dynasty: the southern part of modern Shanxi. Although it grew in power during the Spring and Autumn period, its aristocratic structure saw it break apart when the duke lost power to his nobles. In 403 BC, the Zhou court recognized Jin's three successor states: Han, Zhao, and Wei. The Partition of Jin marks the end of the Spring and Autumn period and the beginning of the Warring States period.

== Geography ==
Jin was located in the lower Fen River drainage basin on the Shanxi plateau. To the north were the Xirong and Beidi peoples. To the west were the Lüliang Mountains and then the Loess Plateau of northern Shaanxi. To the southwest the Fen River turns west to join the south-flowing part of the Yellow River which soon leads to the Guanzhong, an area of the Wei River Valley that was the heartland of the Western Zhou and later of the Qin. To the south are the Zhongtiao Mountains and then the east–west valley of the Yellow River which was the main route to the Wei Valley to the west. To the east were the Taihang Mountains and then the North China Plain. This location gave ambitious Jin dukes the opportunity to move north to conquer and absorb the Xirong tribes, move southwest to fight Qin, and move southeast to absorb the many smaller Zhou states.

Also important to the region were the large states of Chu to the south in the Yangtze and Huai River regions and Qi to the east in Shandong.

Jin had multiple capitals. The first capital of Jin was Tang (唐). The capital was later moved to E (鄂), then Jiang (絳), then Xintian (新田). From 746 to 677 BC, Quwo (曲沃) was the capital of a fragment of Jin.

== Western Zhou (1046–771 BC) ==
When the Zhou Dynasty was founded, the conquered lands were given to Zhou relatives and ministers as hereditary fiefs. King Cheng of Zhou, the second Zhou king, gave the land called Tang (唐), west of modern Yicheng County in Shanxi, to his younger brother, Tang Shuyu (唐叔虞) with the rank of a marquis. Tang Shuyu's son and successor, Marquis Xie of Jin (晉侯燮), changed the name of Tang to Jin. There is little information about Jin for this period beyond a list of rulers.

== Spring and Autumn period ==
In 771 BC the Quanrong nomads drove the Zhou out of the Wei River valley and killed the king. Marquis Wen of Jin, the eleventh marquis of Jin, supported King Ping of Zhou by killing his rival, King Xie of Zhou, an act that King Ping heavily rewarded him for.

=== The breakaway state of Quwo (745–677 BC) ===
When Marquis Zhao of Jin (745–739 BC) acceded to the throne, he gave the land of Quwo to his uncle Chengshi who became Huan Shu of Quwo. In 739 BC, an official named Panfu (潘父) murdered Marquis Zhao and invited Huan Shu to take the throne. Huan Shu entered Jin but was driven out by the people and retreated to Quwo. All three Quwo rulers, Huan Shu (745–731), Zhuang Bo (731–716) and Duke Wu (716–678) made attempts to take over Jin. In 678 BC, Duke Wu of Quwo conquered Jin and killed Marquis Min of Jin (704–678). One year later, after receiving gifts from Duke Wu, King Xi of Zhou made Duke Wu the legal ruler of Jin, who became known as Duke Wu of Jin (679–677).

=== Ascendency ===
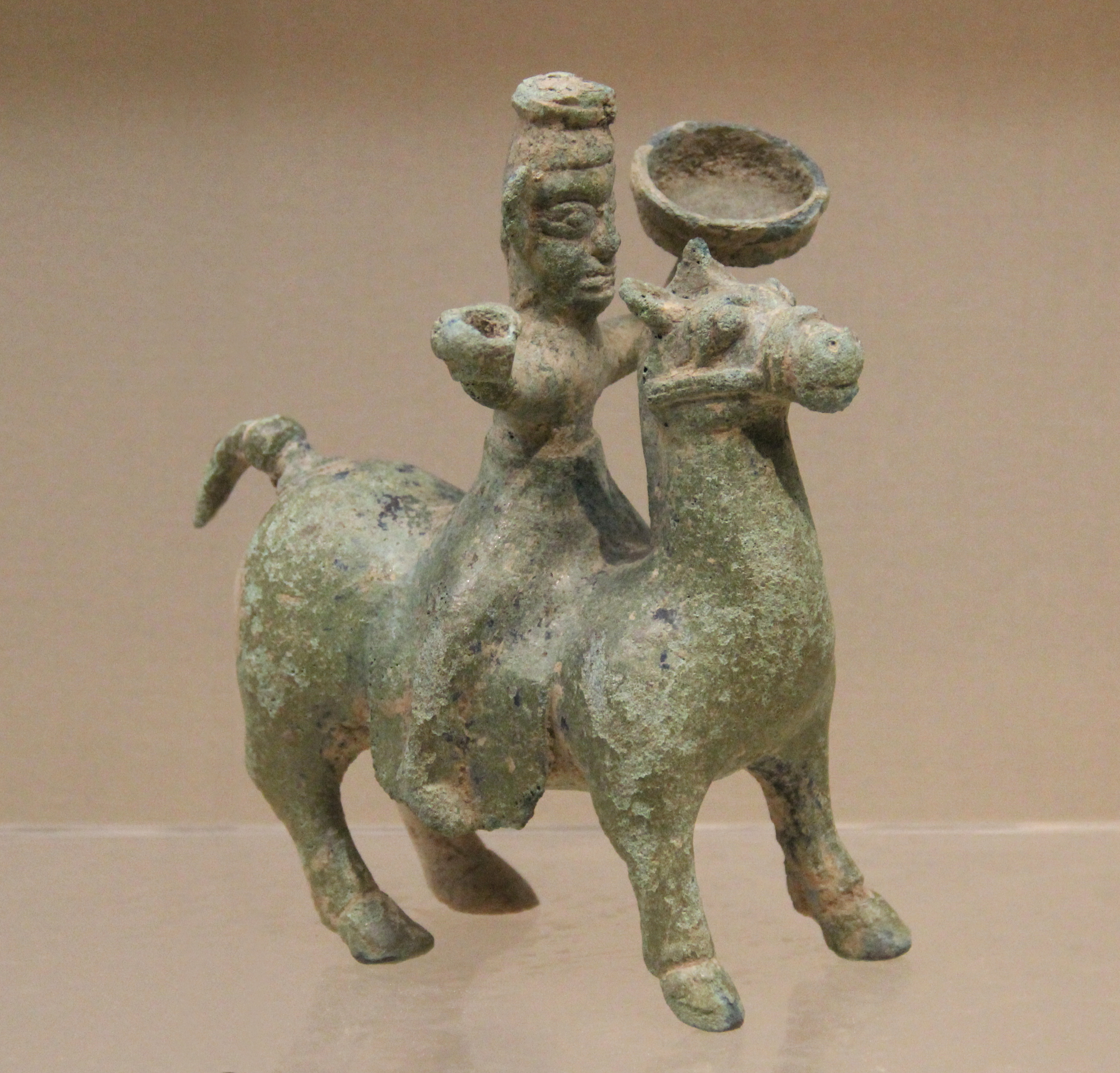
Jin bronze horse and rider

With the establishment of the Quwo line, Jin became the most powerful state for three generations and remained powerful for a century or more after that. Duke Wu died soon after gaining control of Jin. He was followed by Duke Xian of Jin (676-651 BC). Xian broke with Zhou feudalism by killing or exiling his cousins and ruling with appointees of various social backgrounds. He annexed 16 or 17 small states in Shanxi, dominated 38 others, and absorbed a number of Rong tribes. Some of the states conquered were Geng (耿), Huo (霍), old Wei (魏), Yu (虞) and Western Guo. His death led to a succession struggle which ended with the enthronement of Duke Hui of Jin (650–637). In 646 BC, Duke Hui was captured by Qin and restored as a vassal.

Another son of Duke Xian was Duke Wen of Jin (636–628), who spent 19 years exile in various courts. He came to the throne in 636 escorted by the troops of his father-in-law, Duke Mu of Qin. Duke Wen quickly established himself as an independent ruler by driving the Di barbarians west of the Yellow River. In 635 BC he supported King Xiang of Zhou against a rival and was rewarded with lands near the royal capital. In 633 BC, he confronted the rising power of the southern state of Chu which was then besieging Song. Instead of directly assisting Song, he attacked two vassals of Chu, Cao and Wei. The following year, he formed a military alliance with Qin, Qi and Song that defeated Chu at the Battle of Chengpu, perhaps the largest battle in the Spring and Autumn period. Shortly after the battle, he held an interstate conference at Jitu (踐土) with King Xiang of Zhou and the rulers of six other states. He affirmed the lords' loyalty and received from the King the title of "ba" or hegemon. At some point, there was a war with Qin, which ended in peace. Duke Wen erected monuments to the fallen on both sides. The Chinese proverb "The Friendship of Qin and Jin", meaning an unbreakable bond, dates from this period.

Over the next century, a four-way balance of power developed between Qin (west), Jin (west-center), Chu (south) and Qi (east), with a number of smaller states between Jin and Qi. In 627 BC, Jin defeated Qin while it was attacking Zheng. Jin invaded Qin in 625 BC and was driven back the following year. In 598 BC, Chu defeated Jin at the Battle of Mi. In 589 BC, Jin defeated Qi at the Battle of An, which had invaded Lu and Wey. About this time, Jin began to support the southeastern state of Wu as a means of weakening Chu. Duke Li of Jin (580–573) allied with Qin and Qi to make an east–west front against the threat of Chu from the south. In 579 BC, a minister of the state of Song arranged a four-power conference in which the states agreed to limit their military strength. Four years later, fighting broke out again; Jin and its allies defeated Chu at the battle of Yingling. Duke Dao of Jin (572–558) strengthened the state by internal improvements rather than external wars. He absorbed a number of Rong tribes and was recognized as Hegemon.

=== Decline and fall ===
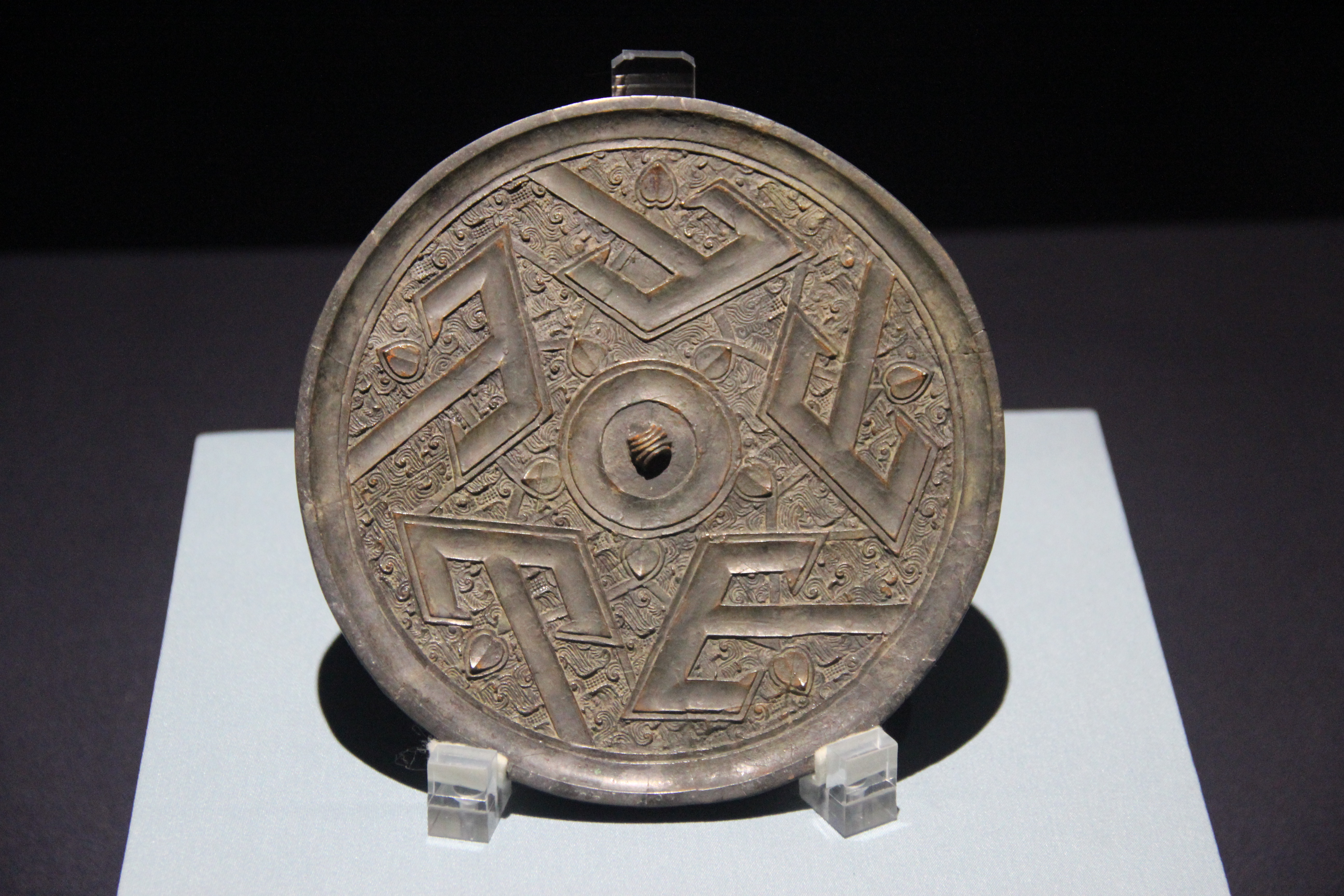
Jin State Bronze Mirror

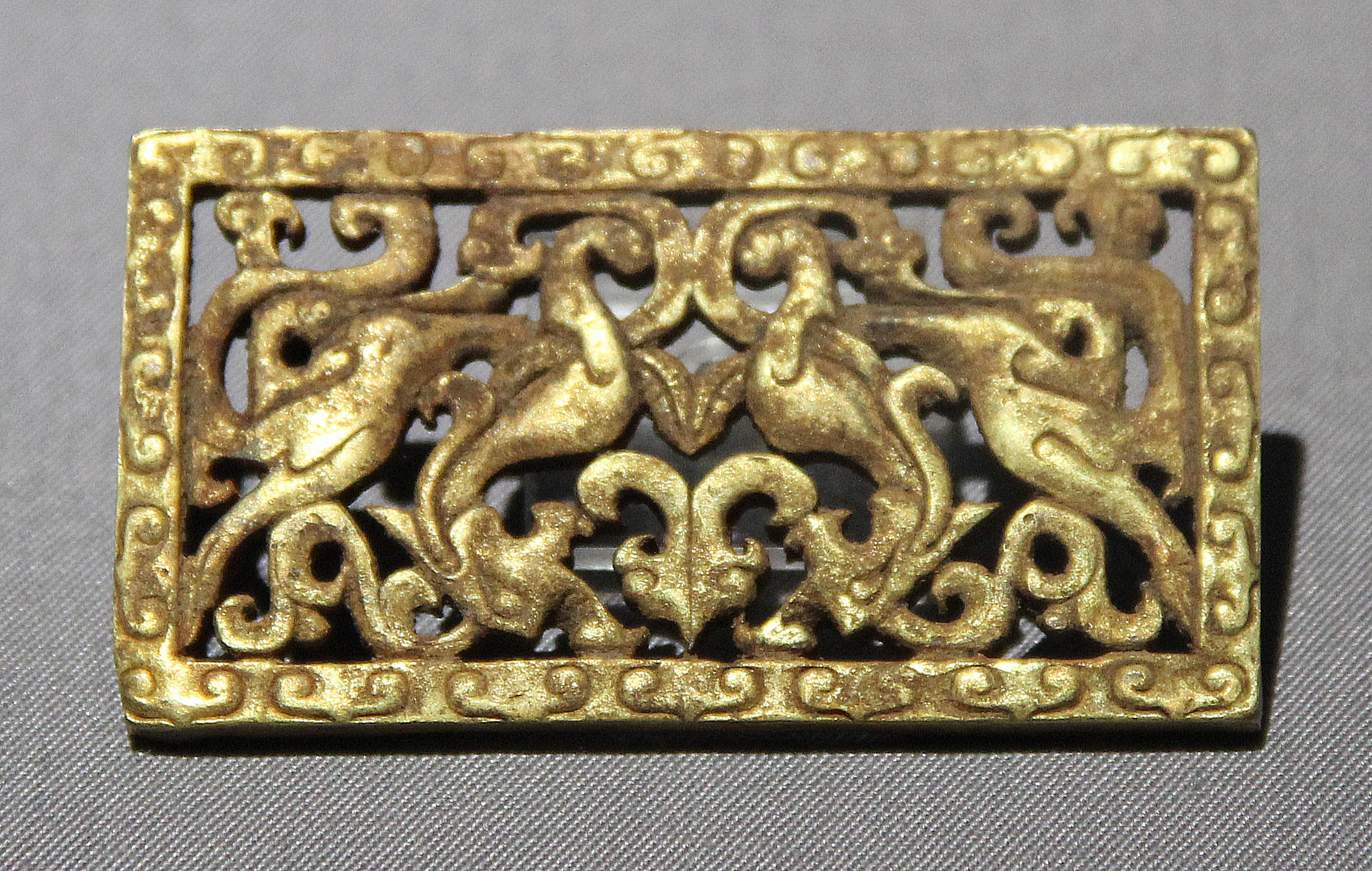
Jin State gilt bronze plaque

In 607 BC, Duke Ling of Jin (620–607) was killed by Zhao Chuan (趙穿) under the orders of his uncle Zhao Dun. Prince Heitun was placed on the throne as Duke Cheng of Jin (606–600). This was the beginning of the slow shift of power from the Jin dukes to the ministerial clans. Duke Li of Jin (580–573), the grandson of Duke Cheng, tried to break the power of the clans by fostering conflicts between them. In 573 BC, he was killed by the Luan (欒氏) and Zhonghang (中行氏) clans. Duke Dao of Jin (572–558) strengthened the ducal power, but could not eliminate the power of the other aristocratic families.

After the reign of Duke Zhao of Jin (531–526), the Jin dukes were figureheads and the state was controlled by six clans: Fan (范), Zhonghang (中行), Zhi (智), Han (韓), Zhao (趙) and Wei (魏).

The clans soon began to fight among themselves. During the time of Duke Ding of Jin (511–475), the Fan and Zhonghang clans were eliminated by Xiangzi of Zhi. By about 450 BC, the Zhi were dominant and began demanding territory from the other clans. When Zhao resisted, Zhi attacked Zhao and brought along Han and Wei as allies. After a long siege at Taiyuan, Han and Wei switched sides and the three weaker clans annihilated the Zhi. They then divided the Zhi lands, as well as most of the rest of Jin, among themselves. When Duke You of Jin (433–416) came to the throne, the three clans had taken over much of the remaining Jin lands, leaving the dukes only the area around Jiang and Quwo. From then on, the three clans were known as the "Three Jins" (三晉).

In 403 BC, during the reign of Duke Lie of Jin (415–389), King Weilie of Zhou recognized Marquis Jing of Han, Marquis Wen of Wei and Marquess Lie of Zhao, as marquises of Han in the south, Wei in the center and Zhao in the north, completing the partition of Jin. The state of Jin still nominally existed for several decades afterwards. The Bamboo Annals mentions that in the 20th year of Duke Huan's reign (369 BC), Marquess Cheng of Zhao and Marquess Gong of Han moved Duke Huan to Tunliu, and after that there were no more records of Duke Huan or any other Jin ruler. Modern historians such as Yang Kuan, Ch'ien Mu, and Han Zhaoqi generally consider 369 BC the final year of Jin's existence.

== Military forces ==
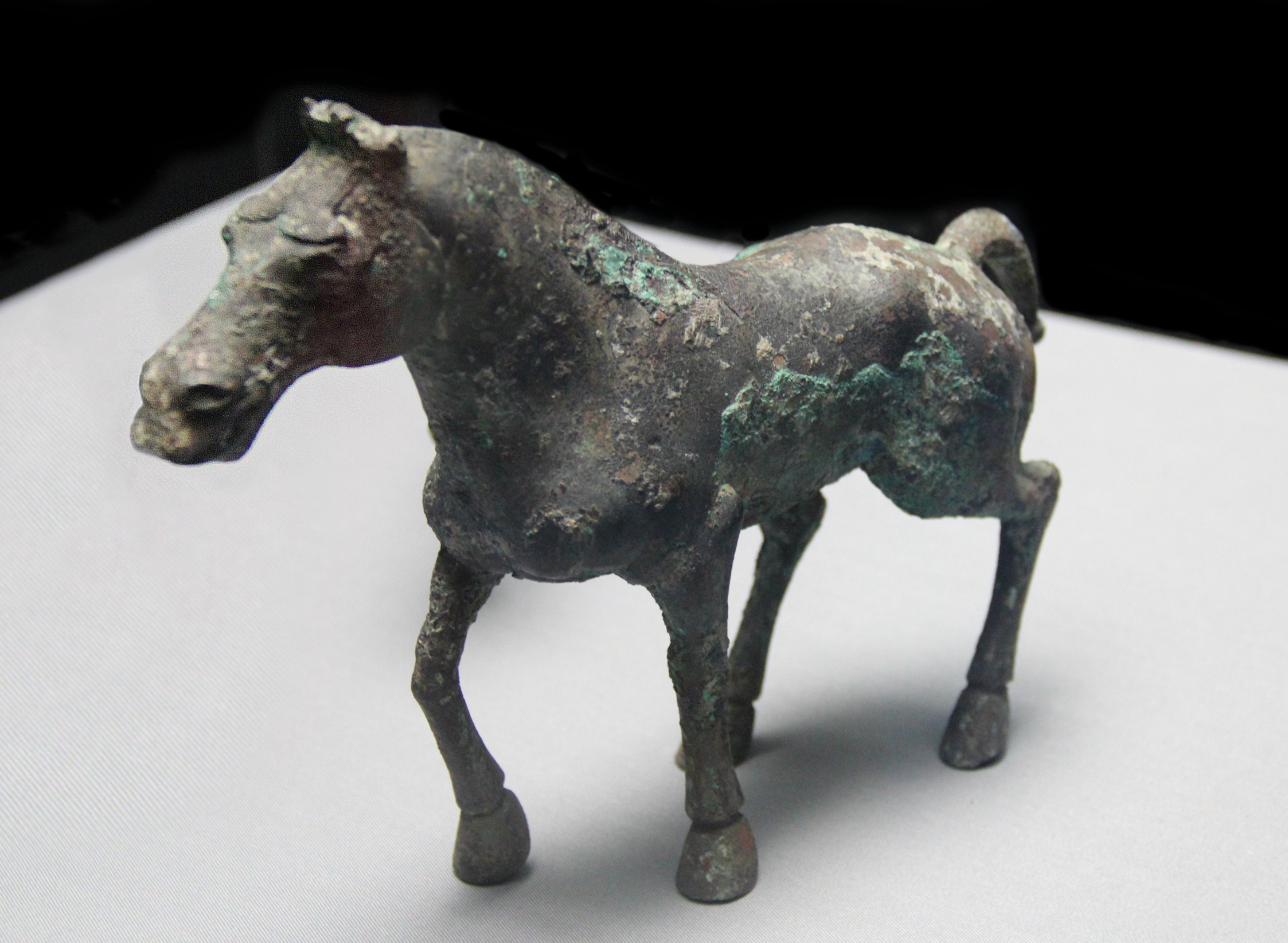
Jin State Bronze Horse

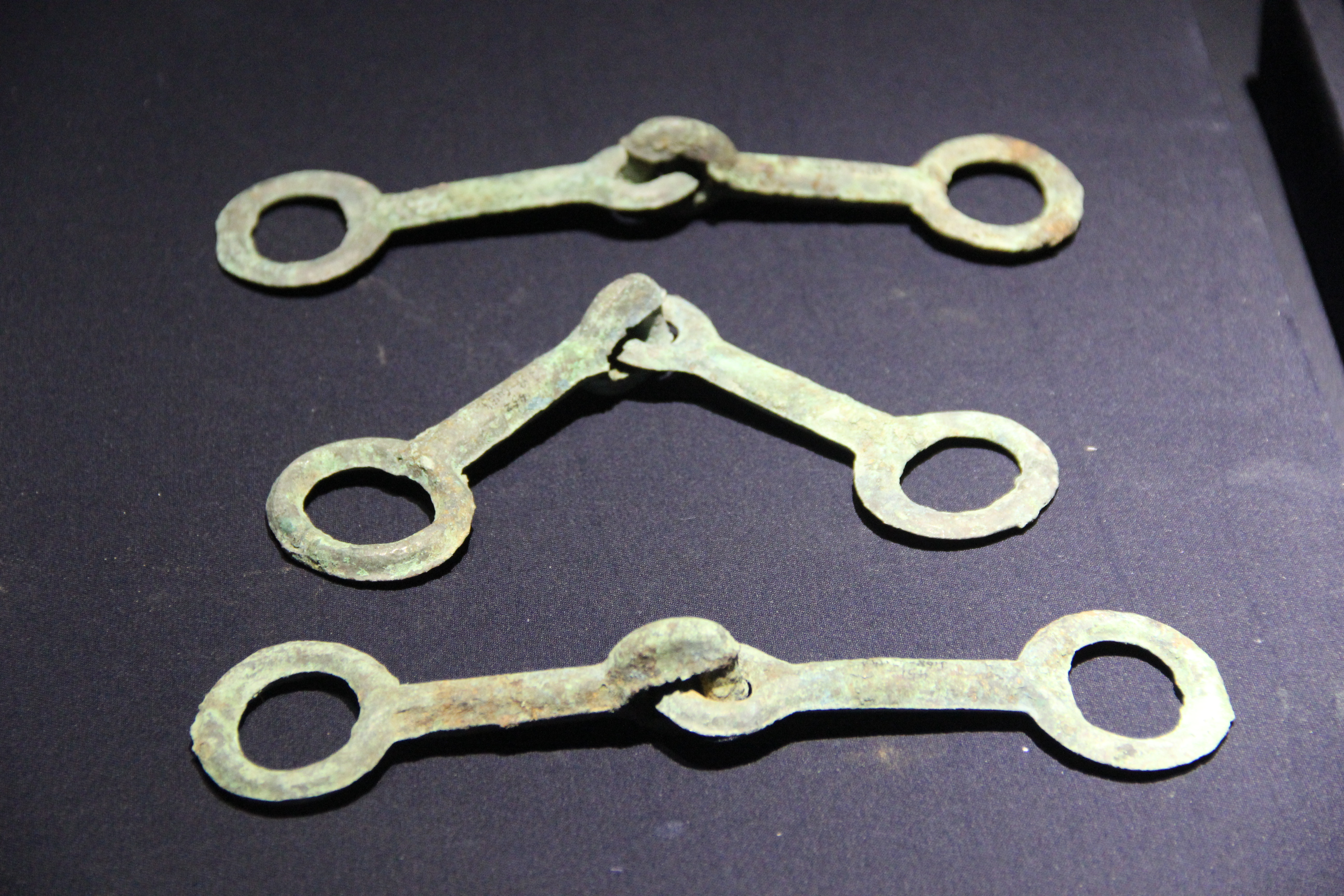
Jin State bronze horse bits

Jin united civil and military authority. Traditionally, Jin had three armies: the upper army, the central army and the lower army. Three more armies were added in 588 BC. Each army contained 12500 soldiers.

According to the convention of Zhou dynasty, a large fiefdom like Jin was allowed to have as many as three armies. However, Jin originally had only one army: the limitation was imposed by the Zhou dynasty king in order to observe the rite of Zhou. In 679 BCE, Duke Wu of Quwo assassinated Marquis Xiaozi of Jin and became the ruler of Jin. Quwo was a cadet branch of Jin's ruling house; Ji clan descended from Shu Yu of Tang. The Zhou court, which regarded the lineal legitimacy as an extremely important matter, could not agree with such an usurpation. As a consequence, the king revoked Jin's permission to have three armies.

In 661 BCE, Duke Xian of Jin lifted this prohibition by establishing the upper army; led by himself and the lower army; commanded by his son Shengshen. Jin's central army was established in the year of 633 BCE by Duke Wen of Jin. In 634 BCE, Duke Wen additionally formed three "ranks" (三行) with the purpose of defending against a Beidi invasion. The three ranks were later redeployed into the "New armies" (新軍). The new armies were largely dependent on the actual military necessity instead of being permanent units. Due to their flexibility, the new armies were sometimes omitted.

According to Tang dynasty scholar Kong Yingda, The central army was the most prestigious army among Jin's three armies. Its commander Zhongjunjiang (中軍將) also governs the state of Jin as Zhengqing (正卿)----Jin's prime minister. Commander of the upper army (Shangjunjiang, 上軍將) and commander of the lower army (Xiajunjiang, 下軍將) did not have the access of political influence in Jin's court and were merely military staffs. Every commander (Junjiang) of an Jin army was accompanied by a Junzuo (軍佐) who was the assistant of Junjiang (軍將). Other posts in the Jin army were Junsima (軍司馬) and Junwei (軍尉), both of which were subordinated under Junjiang and Junzuo.

=== Military ranks ===
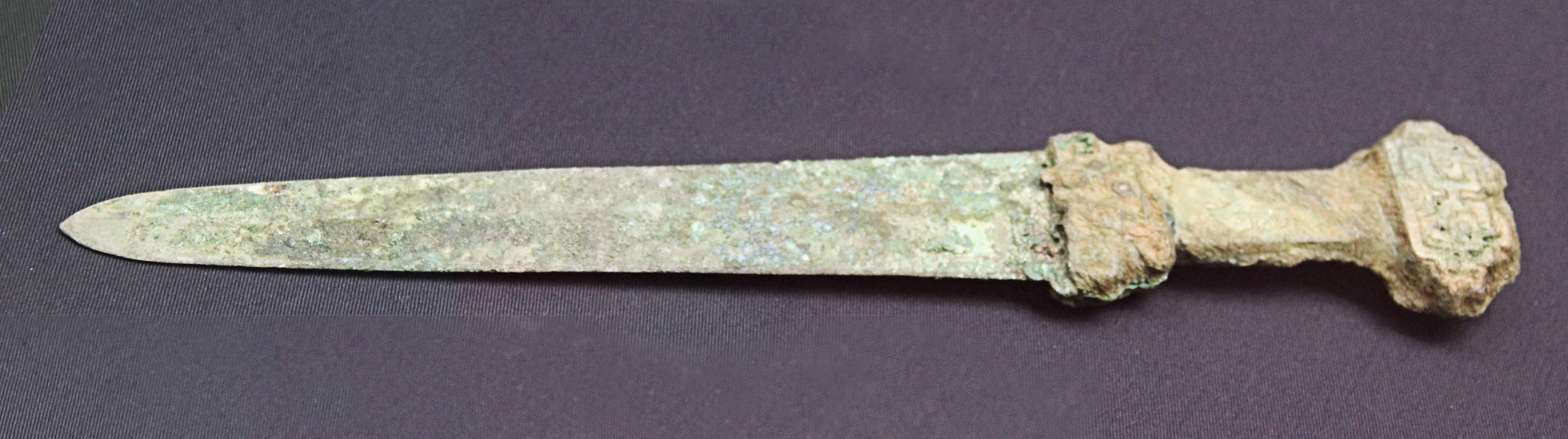
Jin State bronze dagger

The main military ranks were:

- Zhongjunjiang (中軍將), also known as Yuanshuai (元帥), Jiangjun (將軍) and Zhengqing; Prime minister of Jin.
- Zhongjunzuo (中軍佐)
- Zhongjunwei (中軍尉), when the country is not at war, Zhongjunwei is in charge of the actual affairs of the central army.
- Shangjunjiang (上軍將)
- Shangjunzuo (上軍佐)
- Shangjunwei (上軍尉), when the country is not at war, Shangjunwei is in charge of the actual affairs of the upper army.
- Xiajunjiang (下軍將)
- Xiajunzuo (下軍佐)
- Zhongjunsima (中軍司馬)
- Shangjunsima (上軍司馬)

== Rulers ==
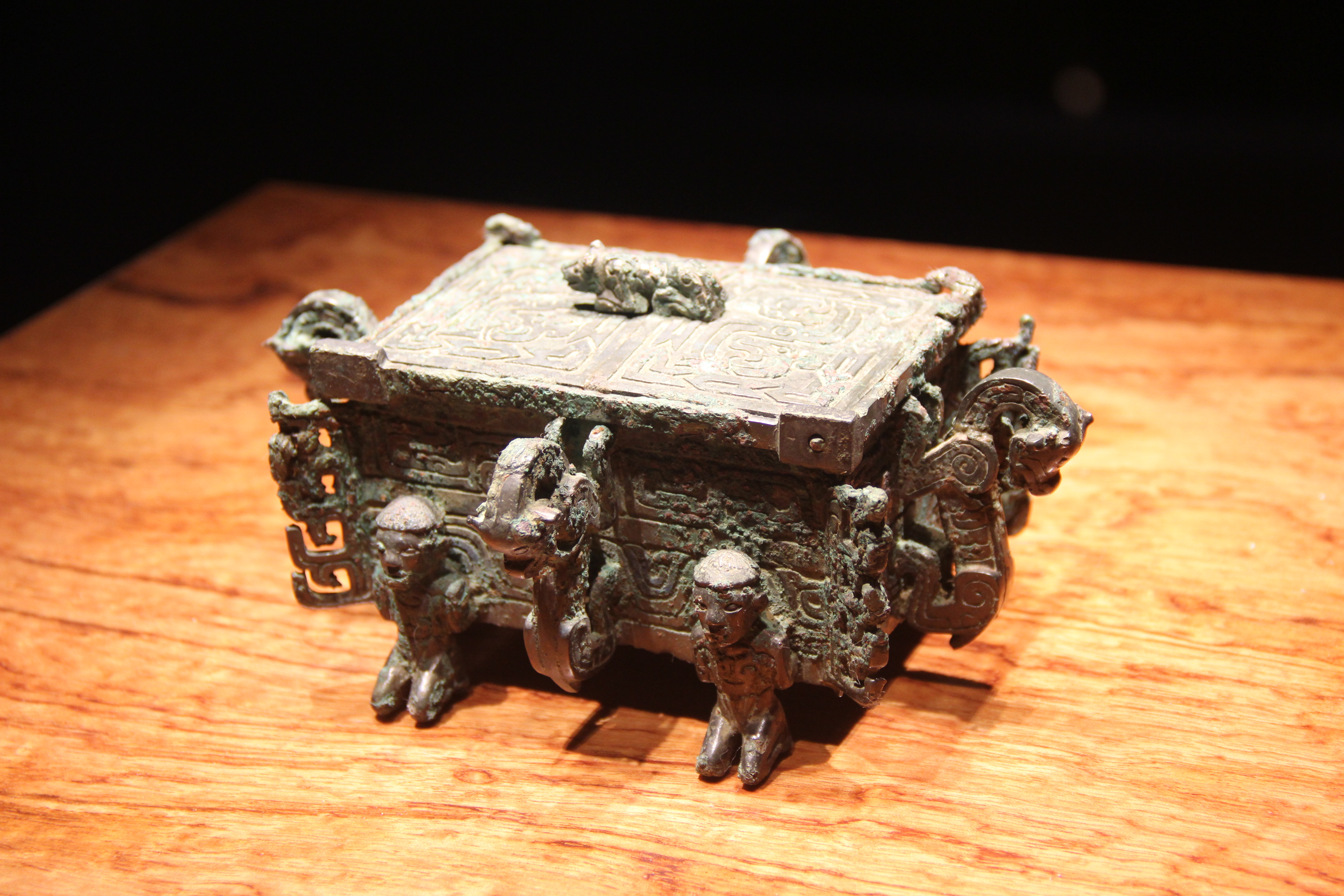
Jin State Western Zhou Bronze Box, Tomb M63, 1993

List of Jin rulers based on the Records of the Grand Historian and the Bamboo Annals.

The original branch:

Title	Given name	Reign
Shu Yu of Tang 唐叔虞	Yú 虞	1042 BC–?
Xie, Marquis of Jin 晉侯燮	Xiè 燮	
Marquis Wu of Jin 晉武侯	Níngzú 寧族	
Marquis Cheng of Jin 晉成侯	Fúrén 服人	
Marquis Li of Jin 晉厲侯	Fú 福	?–859 BC
Marquis Jing of Jin 晉靖侯	Yíjìu 宜臼	858–841 BC
Marquis Xi of Jin 晉釐侯	Sītú 司徒	840–823 BC
Marquis Xian of Jin 晉獻侯	Jí 籍	822–812 BC
Marquis Mu of Jin 晉穆侯	Fèiwáng 費王	811–785 BC
Shang Shu 殤叔	unknown	784–781 BC
Marquis Wen of Jin 晉文侯	Chóu 仇	780–746 BC
Marquis Zhao of Jin 晉昭侯	Bó 伯	745–740 BC
Marquis Xiao of Jin 晉孝侯	Píng 平	739–724 BC
Marquis E of Jin 晉鄂侯	Xì 郤	723–718 BC
Marquis Ai of Jin 晉哀侯	Guāng 光	717–709 BC
Marquis Xiaozi of Jin 晉小子侯	unknown	708–705 BC
Min, Marquis of Jin 晉侯緡	Mín 緡	704–678 BC

The Quwo branch, replacing the original branch in 678 BC:

Title	Given name	Reign
Huan Shu of Quwo 曲沃桓叔	Chéngshī 成師	745–732 BC
Zhuang Bo of Quwo 曲沃莊伯	Shàn 鱓	731–716 BC
Duke Wu of Quwo and Jin 曲沃(晉)武公	Chēng 稱	715–679 BC as Duke of Quwo; 678–677 BC as Duke of Jin
Duke Xian of Jin 晉獻公	Guǐzhū 詭諸	676–651 BC
Duke Shao of Jin 晉少公	Xiqi 奚齊	651 BC
Zhuozi 卓子	Zhuō 卓	651 BC
Duke Hui of Jin 晉恵公	Yíwú 夷吾	650–637 BC
Duke Huai of Jin 晉懷公	Yǔ 圉	637 BC
Duke Wen of Jin 晉文公	Chóng'ěr 重耳	636–628 BC
Duke Xiang of Jin 晉襄公	Huān 驩	627–621 BC
Duke Ling of Jin 晉靈公	Yígāo 夷皋	620–607 BC
Duke Cheng of Jin 晉成公	Hēitún 黑臀	606–600 BC
Duke Jing of Jin 晉景公	Jù 據	599–581 BC
Duke Li of Jin 晉厲公	Shòumàn 壽曼	580–573 BC
Duke Dao of Jin 晉悼公	Zhōu 周	573–558 BC
Duke Ping of Jin 晉平公	Biāo 彪	557–532 BC
Duke Zhao of Jin 晉昭公	Yí 夷	531–526 BC
Duke Qing of Jin 晉頃公	Qùjí 去疾	525–512 BC
Duke Ding of Jin 晉定公	Wǔ 午	511–475 BC
Duke Chu of Jin 晉出公	Záo 鑿	474–452 BC
Duke Jing (or Ai or Yi) 晉敬公/哀公/懿公	Jiāo 驕	451–434 BC
Duke You of Jin 晉幽公	Liǔ 柳	433–416 BC
Duke Lie of Jin 晉烈公	Zhǐ 止	415–389 BC
Duke Huan (or Xiao) 晉桓公/孝公	Qí 頎	388–369 BC

The Records of the Grand Historian (Shiji) also has another Duke Jing after Duke Xiao. However, Shiji's account of the last rulers of Jin is often self-contradictory, and is further contradicted by the Bamboo Annals, which does not mention any Jin ruler after Duke Huan of Jin. Historians such as Yang Kuan, Ch'ien Mu, and Han Zhaoqi generally regard the Bamboo Annals as more reliable, as it was unearthed from the tomb of King Xiang (died 296 BC) of the State of Wei, one of the three successor states of Jin. Duke Huan is therefore generally considered the final ruler of Jin.

== Later tradition ==
=== Claimed descendants ===
The Sui dynasty Emperors were from the northwest military aristocracy, and emphasized that their patrilineal ancestry was ethnic Han, claiming descent from the Han official Yang Zhen. and the New Book of Tang traced his patrilineal ancestry to the Zhou dynasty kings via Ji Boqiao (姬伯僑), who was the son of Duke Wu of Jin. Ji Boqiao's family became known as the "sheep tongue family" (羊舌氏).

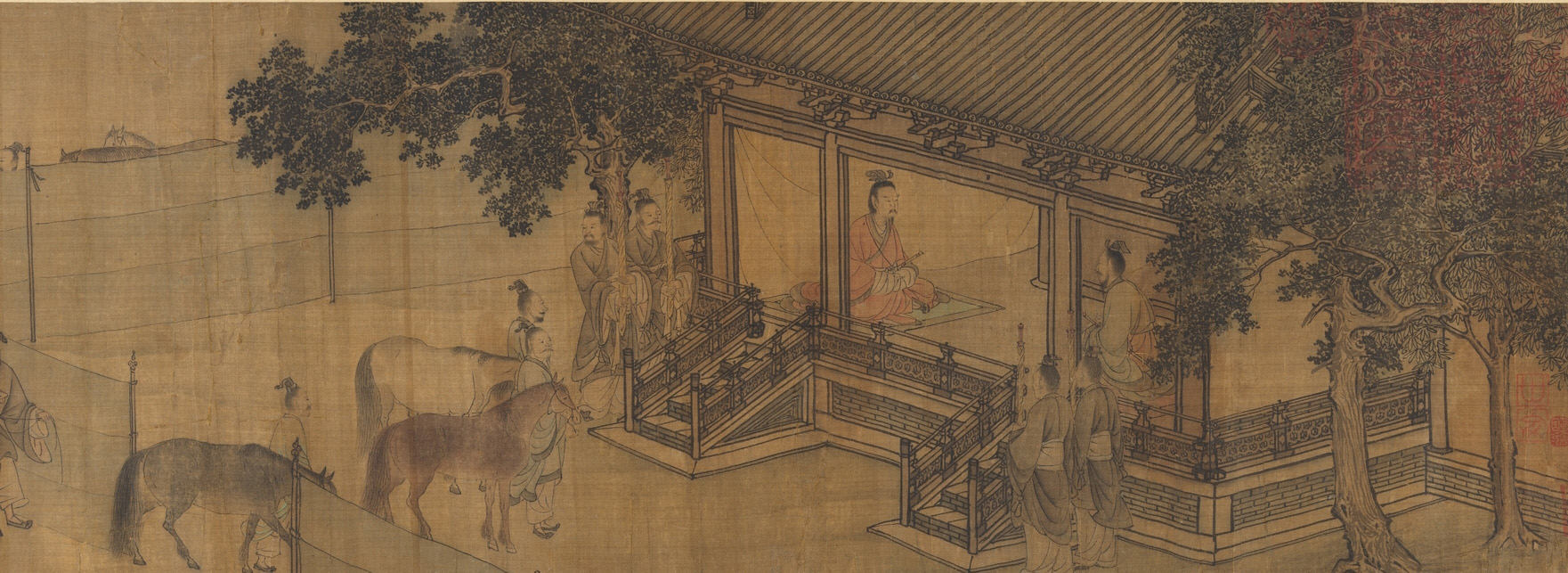
Song dynasty painting of Duke Wen of Jin Recovering His State, attributed to Li Tang, 1140 CE (Metropolitan Museum of Art)

The Yang clan of Hongnong (弘農楊氏) were asserted as ancestors by the Sui Emperors like the Li clan of Longxi were asserted as ancestors of the Tang Emperors. The Li of Zhaojun and the Lu of Fanyang hailed from Shandong and were related to the Liu clan which was also linked to the Yang clan of Hongnong and other clans of Guanlong. Duke Wu of Jin was claimed as the ancestors of the Hongnong Yang.

The Yang clan of Hongnong, Jia clan of Hedong, Xiang clan of Henei, and Wang clan of Taiyuan from the Tang dynasty were claimed as ancestors by Song dynasty lineages.

There were Dukedoms for the offspring of the royal families of the Zhou dynasty, Sui dynasty, and Tang dynasty in the Later Jin (Five Dynasties).

=== Astrology ===
Jin is represented by the star 36 Capricorni (b Capricorni) in the asterism Twelve States, Girl mansion. Jin is also represented by the star Kappa Herculis in asterism Right Wall, Heavenly Market enclosure (see Chinese constellation).
