= Duke Ping of Jin =

Ruler of the state of Jin

Duke Ping of Jin 晉平公

Duke of Jin
- Reign: 557–532 BC
- Predecessor: Duke Dao
- Successor: Duke Zhao
- Died: 532 BC
- Issue: Duke Zhao; Consort of King Ling of Chu
Names
- Ancestral name: Jī (姬); Given name: Biāo (彪)
Posthumous name
- Duke Ping (平公) or Duke Zhuangping (莊平公)
- House: Ji
- Dynasty: Jin
- Father: Duke Dao

Duke Ping of Jin (Chinese: 晉平公; pinyin: Jìn Píng Gōng), personal name Ji Biao, was from 557 BC to 532 BC the ruler of the Jin state. He succeeded his father, Duke Dao, who died in 558 BC.

== Battle of Zhanban ==
In 557 BC, soon after Duke Ping ascended the throne, Jin fought its last major battle with its traditional enemy Chu at Zhanban (湛阪, in present-day Pingdingshan, Henan Province). Chu was defeated and lost all of its territory north of Fangcheng. The Battle of Zhanban marked the end of the eight-decade-long Jin-Chu rivalry, as a weakened Chu would be consumed by numerous wars with its new enemy Wu, culminating in the 506 BC Battle of Boju, when the Wu army would capture and destroy the Chu capital Ying. Meanwhile, Jin would increasingly be riven by internal strife that would ultimately lead to its partition into the new states of Han, Zhao, and Wei.

== Battle of Pingyin ==
In 555 BC, Duke Ling of the State of Qi switched his alliance from Jin to its enemy Chu. In response, Duke Ping invaded and inflicted a crushing defeat on Qi. The Jin army occupied large swathes of Qi territory, besieged the Qi capital Linzi, and burned down the outer portion of the city.

== Rebellion of Luan Ying ==
In 550 BC, Jin general Luan Ying (欒盈) from the powerful Luan clan rebelled at Quwo with support from Duke Zhuang II of Qi. Aided by the Wei clan, Luan's forces captured the capital Jiang (綘), before being defeated by the Jin army. Luan Ying was killed at Quwo and the Luan clan was exterminated. Two years later Jin attacked Qi again for supporting Luan's rebellion.

== Death and succession ==
Duke Ping reigned for 26 years and died in 532 BC. He was succeeded by his son Yi, Duke Zhao of Jin.

Duke Ping of Jin House of Ji Cadet branch of the House of Ji Died: 532 BC
Regnal titles
Preceded by Duke Dao of Jin	Duke of Jin; 557–532 BC	Succeeded by Duke Zhao of Jin
