= Marquis Jing of Jin =

Marquis Jing of Jin 晉靖侯

Marquis of Jin
- Reign: 858–841 BC
- Predecessor: Marquis Li
- Successor: Marquis Xi
- Died: 841 BC
- Issue: Marquis Xi
Names
- Ancestral name: Jī (姬); Given name: Yíjiù (宜臼) or Xǐfù (喜父)
Posthumous name
- Marquis Jing (靖侯)
- House: Ji
- Dynasty: Jin
- Father: Marquis Li

Marquis Jing of Jin (Chinese: 晉靖侯; pinyin: Jìn Jìng Hóu), personal name Ji Yijiu, was a marquis of the Jin state. He was the successor of Marquis Li, his father. He was in turn succeeded by his son, Marquis Xi.

== Yangshe clan ==
According to surname records, the Chinese surname Yangshe (羊舌) originated in the state of Jin. Marquis Jing of Jin's son, Boqiao (伯僑) has a grandson named Tu (突). During the time of Marquis Xian of Jin, Tu was given a land called Yangshe, modern Hongdong County and Qin County, Shanxi, by Marquis Xian of Jin. Therefore, Tu's clan name became Yangshe and this is where the surname Yangshe started.

Marquis Jing of Jin House of Ji Cadet branch of the House of Ji Died: 841 BC
Chinese nobility
| Preceded by Marquis Li of Jin | Marquis of Jin; 858–841 BC | Succeeded by Marquis Xi of Jin |
