= Marquis Wen of Jin =

Ruler of the state of Jin (805–746 BC)

Marquis Wen of Jin 晉文侯

Marquis of Jin
- Reign: 781–746 BC
- Predecessor: Shang Shu
- Successor: Marquis Zhao
- Born: 805 BC
- Died: 746 BC
- Issue: Marquis Zhao
Names
- Ancestral name: Jī (姬); Given name: Chóu (仇)
Posthumous name
- Marquis Wen (文侯)
- Father: Marquis Mu

Marquis Wen of Jin (Chinese: 晉文侯; pinyin: Jìn Wén Hóu; 805–746 BC), personal name Ji Chou, was a marquis of the Jin state. He was also the first ruler of Jin in the Spring and Autumn period.

In 805 BC, Marquis Mu battled the Tiaorong (條戎) tribe. During this time, his son, the future Marquis Wen was born. In 785 BC, Marquis Mu died and Marquis Wen's uncle, Shang Shu, took control and ascended the throne of Jin. Marquis Wen left Jin in fear of his uncle despite believing that he was the rightful heir to the throne.

In 781 BC, after four years away from Jin, Marquis Wen returned to Jin with troops with the aim of removing his uncle from the throne. He succeeded and became the ruler of Jin.

In 771 BC, King You of Zhou was killed by Quanrong nomads and two Zhou royal family members were subsequently and separately declared king in opposition to each other: King Ping of Zhou and King Xie of Zhou.

In 750 BC, Marquis Wen killed King Xie of Zhou, and the Zhou royal government came under one ruler once more. Since this action helped King Ping of Zhou in establishing the Eastern Zhou dynasty, Marquis Wen was greatly rewarded. King Ping of Zhou also granted him additional lands. Also, with the permission of King Ping of Zhou, Marquis Wen expanded the territory of Jin, especially into areas around the Jin River.

In 746 BC, Marquis Wen died and was succeeded by his son, Marquis Zhao.

Cheng Pingshan has proposed that Marquis Wen's reign lasted from 771 BC to 736 BC. Although speculative, this view fits the narrative of the Xinian manuscript discovered in 2008.

Marquis Wen of Jin House of Ji Cadet branch of the House of Ji Born: 805 BC Died: 746 BC
Regnal titles
Preceded by Shang Shu	Marquis of Jin; 781–746 BC	Succeeded by Marquis Zhao of Jin
