= Marquis Cheng of Jin =

Marquis Cheng of Jin 晉成侯

Marquis of Jin
- Predecessor: Marquis Wu
- Successor: Marquis Li
- Issue: Marquis Li
Names
- Ancestral name: Jī (姬); Given name Fúrén (服人)
Posthumous name
- Marquis Cheng (成侯)
- House: Ji
- Dynasty: Jin
- Father: Marquis Wu

Marquis Cheng of Jin (Chinese: 晉成侯; pinyin: Jìn Chéng Hóu), personal name Ji Furen, was a marquis of the Jin state. He succeeded his father, Marquis Wu, and was in turn succeeded by his son, Marquis Li.

Marquis Cheng of Jin House of Ji Cadet branch of the House of Ji
Chinese nobility
Preceded by Marquis Wu of Jin	Marquis of Jin	Succeeded by Marquis Li of Jin
