= Duke Qing of Jin =

Ruler of the Chinese state of Jin from 525 BC to 512 BC

Duke Qing of Jin 晉頃公

Duke of Jin
- Reign: 525–512 BC
- Predecessor: Duke Zhao
- Successor: Duke Ding
- Died: 512 BC
- Issue: Duke Ding
Names
- Ancestral name: Jī (姬); Given name: Qùjí (去疾) or Qìjí (棄疾)
Posthumous name
- Duke Qing (頃公)
- House: Ji
- Dynasty: Jin
- Father: Duke Zhao

Duke Qing of Jin (Chinese: 晉頃公; pinyin: Jìn Qǐng Gōng), personal name Ji Quji or Ji Qiji, was the ruler of the Jin state from 525 BC to 512 BC. He succeeded his father, Duke Zhao, who died in 526 BC.

In 520 BC, King Jing of Zhou died. The king's three sons – Crown Prince Gai, Prince Meng, and Prince Chao – fought each other for the Zhou throne. Jin's six major clans—Han (韓), Zhao (趙), Wei (魏), Fan (范), Zhonghang (中行), and Zhi (智)—intervened and assisted Crown Prince Gai ascend the Zhou throne.

In 514 BC, two smaller clans—Qi (祁) and Yangshe (羊舌)—were exterminated and the six major clans grew even more powerful.

Duke Qing reigned for 14 years and died in 512 BC. He was succeeded by his son, Duke Ding.

Duke Qing of Jin House of Ji Cadet branch of the House of Ji Died: 512 BC
Regnal titles
Preceded by Duke Zhao of Jin	Duke of Jin; 525–512 BC	Succeeded by Duke Ding of Jin
