= Duke Jing of Jin (Ju) =

Ruler, state of Jin, China, c.6th BC

Duke Jing of Jin 晉景公

Duke of Jin
- Reign: 599–581 BC
- Predecessor: Duke Cheng
- Successor: Duke Li
- Died: 581 BC
- Issue: Duke Li
Names
- Ancestral name: Jī (姬); Given name: Jù (據) or Nòu (獳)
Posthumous name
- Duke Jing (景公)
- House: Ji
- Dynasty: Jin
- Father: Duke Cheng

Duke Jing of Jin (Chinese: 晉景公; pinyin: Jìn Jǐng Gōng), personal name Ji Ju or Ji Nou, was monarch of the Jin state from 599 BC to 581 BC. He succeeded his father, Duke Cheng, who died in 600 BC.

== Battle of Bi ==
In 597 BC, the third year of Duke Jing's rule, King Zhuang of Chu attacked the State of Zheng, then a Jin ally. Duke Jing dispatched an army led by Xun Linfu (荀林父), Sui Hui (隨會), and Zhao Shuo (趙朔) to help Zheng. However, by the time the Jin army arrived Zheng had already surrendered to Chu. Xun Linfu wanted to return to Jin, but general Xian Hu (先縠) persuaded him to attack Chu. The Jin army was then decisively defeated at the Battle of Bi by the Chu and Zheng forces. After the battle King Zhuang of Chu was recognized as the Hegemon of China. Although Jin was weakened by the defeat, it was still one of the strongest states of China. Just two years later Jin attacked Zheng in retaliation for helping Chu in the Battle of Bi.

== Conquest of the Red Di ==
Xian Hu, who was partly responsible for Jin's defeat at the Battle of Bi, escaped to the Red Di tribes for fear of punishment. In 596 BC, the Red Di people took advantage of Jin's recent defeat and attacked Jin with Xian Hu's help. Jin killed Xian Hu and his entire clan.

Duke Jing's elder sister Bo Ji was the wife of Ying'er (嬰兒), the ruler of Lushi (潞氏), a major Red Di state. In 594 BC Bo Ji was killed by the Lushi minister Feng Shu. In retaliation, general Xun Linfu attacked Lushi, conquering the state and capturing its ruler Ying'er. Feng Shu fled to the State of Wey but was returned to Jin and killed. The following year, Jin conquered several more Red Di states or tribes.

== Battle of An ==
In 589 BC the State of Qi, another major power, attacked the states of Lu and Wey, two Jin allies, and annexed the Lu city of Long. In response, Duke Jing dispatched the Jin army led by generals Xi Ke, Shi Xie, Luan Shu, and Han Jue to help his allies. The Jin and Qi forces fought at An (near present-day Jinan), and Jin decisively defeated Qi. The Qi ruler Duke Qing narrowly escaped capture by exchanging clothes and position with officer Pang Choufu (逢丑父), who was taken prisoner by Han Jue mistaking him as Duke Qing. After the battle Duke Qing was forced to plead for peace and cede territory to the state of Lu. Winning the Battle of An enabled Jin to regain much of its prestige lost at the Battle of Bi, and expand its armed forces from three armies to six.

== Abdication and death ==
In summer 581 BC, the 19th year of his reign, Duke Jing fell ill. He abdicated in favor of his son Duke Li of Jin, and died a month later.

The events surrounding his death are detailed in the Chinese classic text Zuo Zhuan. According to the Zuo Zhuan, the duke first dreamt of a malevolent spirit. After waking, he consulted a wu (a shaman), who told him that he would not live to eat the new harvest's wheat. The duke's illness worsened and he had a new dream in which two urchins, apparently personifying his disease, taunted him, saying that medicine cannot reach them. A physician from the state of Qin was consulted. He told the duke that the disease had reached the gaohuang (膏肓), the fatty region between the heart and diaphragm, and was therefore incurable. The duke praised the physician for his skill, rewarded him lavishly and sent him away.

On day bingwu of the sixth month (August-September), the duke asked for and was presented with the new harvest wheat. Believing the shaman to have made a wrong prediction, he summoned him, showed him the new wheat, and had him executed. Just as he was about to eat, the duke felt bloated, went to the toilet, accidentally fell in and died. At noon, a slave carried the duke's body out of the toilet. Earlier that morning, the slave had a dream that he was carrying his lord to the heavens. Consequently, the slave was buried with the duke to serve him in the afterlife. (Note: 晉侯夢大厲……公覺，召桑田巫。巫言如夢。公曰：「何如？」曰：「不食新矣。」公疾病，求醫於秦。秦伯使醫緩為之。未至，公夢疾為二豎子，曰：「彼，良醫也。懼傷我，焉逃之？」其一曰：「居肓之上，膏之下，若我何？」醫至，曰：「疾不可為也。在肓之上，膏之下，攻之不可，達之不及，藥不至焉，不可為也。」公曰：「良醫也。」厚為之禮而歸之。六月丙午，晉侯欲麥，使甸人獻麥，饋人為之。召桑田巫，示而殺之。將食，張，如廁，陷而卒。小臣有晨夢負公以登天，及日中，負晉侯出諸廁，遂以為殉。[The Zhuan says:——'The marquis of Jin saw in a dream a great demon with dishevelled hair reaching to the ground, which beat its breast, and leaped up, saying. "You have slain my descendants unrighteously, and I have presented my request to God in consequence [This would be the Spirit of the founder of the Zhao clan]." It then broke the great gate [of the palace], advanced to the gate of the State chamber, and entered. The duke was afraid and went into a side-chamber, the door of which it also broke. The duke then awoke, and called for the witch of Sangtian, who told him everything which he had dreamt. "What will be the issue?" asked the duke. "You will not taste the new wheat," she replied. 'After this, the duke became very ill, and asked the services of a physician from Qin, the earl of which sent the physician Huan to do what he could for him. Before he came, the duke dreamt that his disease turned into two boys, who said, "That is a skilful physician; it is to be feared he will hurt us; how shall we get out of his way?" Then one of them said. "If we take our place above the heart and below the throat, what can he do to us?" When the physician arrived, he said, "Nothing can be done for this disease. Its seat is above the heart and below the throat. If I assail it [with medicine], it will be of no use; if I attempt to puncture it, it cannot be reached. Nothing can be done for it." The duke said, "He is a skilful physician," gave him large gifts, and sent him back to Qin. 'In the sixth month, on Bingwu, the marquis wished to taste the new wheat, and made the superintendent of his fields present some. While the baker was getting it ready, they called the witch of Sangtian, showed her the wheat, and put her to death. As the marquis was about to taste the wheat, he felt it necessary to go to the privy, into which he fell, and so died. One of the servants that waited on him had dreamt in the morning that he carried the marquis on his back up to heaven. The same at mid-day carried him on his back out from the privy, and was afterwards buried alive with him!]) This vivid account has given rise to a chengyu (four-character classical idiom), 病入膏肓 ('the disease has entered the gaohuang'), used to describe an incurable illness, or more broadly, a situation beyond remediation.

== Footnotes ==
Duke Jing of Jin House of Ji Cadet branch of the House of Ji Died: 581 BC
Regnal titles
Preceded by Duke Cheng of Jin	Duke of Jin; 599–581 BC	Succeeded by Duke Li of Jin
