= Duke Xiang of Jin =

Ruler of the state of Jin

Duke Xiang of Jin 晉襄公

Duke of Jin
- Reign: 627–621 BC
- Predecessor: Duke Wen
- Successor: Duke Ling
- Died: 621 BC
- Spouse: Mu Ying
- Issue: Duke Ling; Ji Jie (姬捷)
Names
- Ancestral name: Jī (姬); Given name: Huān (驩)
Posthumous name
- Duke Xiang (襄公)
- House: Ji
- Dynasty: Jin
- Father: Duke Wen

Duke Xiang of Jin (Chinese: 晉襄公; pinyin: Jìn Xiāng Gōng), personal name Ji Huan, was from 627 to 621 BC the ruler of the Jin state. He succeeded his father, Duke Wen, who was one of the Five Hegemons of China's Spring and Autumn period.

== Battle of Yao ==
After Duke Wen died in the ninth month of 628 BC, Duke Mu of Qin sent an army to attack the State of Zheng. They retreated without attacking Zheng but destroyed the minor state of Hua instead. In the fourth month of the following year, when the Qin army was passing through Jin territory on their way back to Qin, Jin launched a surprise attack at the Battle of Yao (殽之戰), annihilated the Qin army and captured three Qin generals. Jin annexed the Hua state. After the battle, the power of Qin in the east had been checked for a long period.

== Succession ==
Duke Xiang reigned for seven years and died in the eighth month of 621 BC. His son Crown Prince Yigao was then still a boy, and there was a major succession crisis, with different factions supporting Duke Xiang's brothers Prince Yong and Prince Le. Yigao eventually ascended the throne with the support of Zhao Dun (趙盾) and would come to be known as Duke Ling of Jin.

Duke Xiang of Jin House of Ji Cadet branch of the House of Ji Died: 621 BC
Regnal titles
| Preceded by Duke Wen of Jin | Duke of Jin; 627–621 BC | Succeeded by Duke Ling of Jin |
