= Duke Jing of Jin (Jiao) =

Ruler of the state of Jin from 451 to 434 BC

Duke Jing of Jin 晉敬公

Duke of Jin
- Reign: 451–434 BC
- Predecessor: Duke Chu
- Successor: Duke You
- Died: 434 BC
- Issue: Duke You
Names
- Ancestral name: Jī (姬); Given name: Jiāo (驕)
Posthumous name
- Duke Jing (敬公) or Duke Ai (哀公) or Duke Yi (懿公)
- House: Ji
- Dynasty: Jin
- Father: Ji Ji (姬忌)

Duke Jing of Jin (Chinese: 晉敬公; pinyin: Jìn Jìng Gōng), personal name Ji Jiao, was from 451 BC to 434 BC the duke of the Jin state.

The Bamboo Annals records his posthumous name as Duke Jing, while accounts by the Han dynasty historian Sima Qian in the Records of the Grand Historian are self-contradictory, referring to him as Duke Ai of Jin (晉哀公) in one chapter and Duke Yi of Jin (晉懿公) in another. Modern historians such as Yang Kuan, Ch'ien Mu, and Han Zhaoqi generally consider the Bamboo Annals more reliable, as it was unearthed from the tomb of King Xiang of Wei, one of the three successor states of Jin that emerged after the Partition of Jin.

== Reign ==
Jin was a major power during the Spring and Autumn period of ancient China, but it had become increasingly dominated by a few aristocratic clans. In 455 BC, near the end of the reign of Duke Jing's predecessor Duke Chu of Jin, the clans of Han, Zhao, and Wei defeated and annihilated Zhi, the most powerful clan, and effectively partitioned Jin into three new states named after the clans.

The following year, Duke Chu fled to the State of Chu. Zhao, Han, and Wei, now effectively in control of Jin, installed Jiao, a prince from a cadet branch of the House of Ji that ruled Jin, on the throne. Jiao, later known as Duke Jing, was a great-grandson of Duke Zhao of Jin. After 18 years of reign as the titular ruler of Jin, Duke Jing died in 434 BC and was succeeded by his son, Duke You of Jin.

Duke Jing of Jin (Jiao) House of Ji Cadet branch of the House of Ji Died: 434 BC
Regnal titles
| Preceded by Duke Chu of Jin | — TITULAR — Duke of Jin; 451–434 BC | Succeeded by Duke You of Jin |
