= Yang Kuan =

Chinese historian (1914–2005)

- 杨宽
- Born: 1914; Qingpu, Shanghai, China
- Died: September 1, 2005 (aged 90–91); Miami, Florida, U.S.
- Education: Guanghua University
- Known for: Doubting Antiquity School; History of the Warring States
- Spouse: Chen Hejing
- Scientific career
- Fields: ancient Chinese history
- Workplaces: Fudan University, Shanghai Academy of Social Sciences

Chinese name
- Traditional Chinese: 楊寬
- Simplified Chinese: 杨宽
Transcriptions
Standard Mandarin
- Hanyu Pinyin: Yáng Kuān

Yang Kuan (1914 − September 1, 2005), styled Kuanzheng (寬正), was a Chinese historian specializing in pre-Qin dynasty Chinese history. He is considered an authority of the Warring States period, and his History of the Warring States, first published in 1955, remains the most authoritative treatment of the subject.

== Early life and education ==
Yang Kuan was born in Qingpu County, Jiangsu Province (now Qingpu District of Shanghai) in 1914. He attended the prestigious Suzhou High School, whose teachers included famous scholars Lü Shuxiang and Ch'ien Mu, one of the greatest historians of modern China.

After high school Yang attended Kwang Hua University in Shanghai − a predecessor of today's East China Normal University − and graduated in 1936 with a degree in Chinese. At Kwang Hua he also studied history under the prominent historian Lü Simian.

== Doubting Antiquity School ==
Yang Kuan gained fame at a young age. In 1933, aged 19, he published his first essay Probing the Legend of Pangu. In 1939, just three years after graduating from college, Yang was invited by Gu Jiegang, founder of the Doubting Antiquity School, to contribute to Gu's influential compilation Debates on Ancient History (古史辨). In 1941, Yang's book-size Introduction to China's High Antiquity was published as part of the seventh and last volume of the Debates on Ancient History.

Yang is generally considered a member of the Doubting Antiquity School, as he argued that the pre-Xia dynasty history recorded in ancient texts was "historization" of prehistoric mythology, a position that is widely accepted by today's historians. However, he disagreed with Gu Jiegang and Kang Youwei's view that ancient scholars such as Confucius and Liu Xin deliberately introduced falsehoods into historical texts, and held the opinion that it was a long process of natural evolution of ancient mythology. Gu later changed his position and accepted Yang's view. Yang further differed from Gu in that he also believed that the extant history of the Xia dynasty was pure mythology.

== Career ==
In 1946 Yang Kuan was appointed curator of Shanghai Museum, a position he continued to hold after the Communist People's Republic of China replaced the Republic of China in 1949. In 1953 he joined the faculty of Shanghai's Fudan University as a history professor. In 1960 he was made the deputy head of the history department of the Shanghai Academy of Social Sciences, but returned to Fudan University in 1970.

== Publications ==
Yang Kuan published his most influential work, History of the Warring States, in 1955. In 1980, a greatly expanded second edition was completed, with major revisions based on new archaeological discoveries made during the intervening decades. He made further revisions in the third edition of 1985. This work is widely considered the most authoritative treatment of the subject, and was included in the official China Chronology Series (中国断代史系列). Another work by Yang, History of the Western Zhou, was also included in the series. In total Yang Kuan published more than a dozen books and 225 essays.

== Later life ==
In 1984 Yang Kuan moved to the United States, settling in Miami, Florida. He continued to write in the US, and published an autobiography. He died in Miami on September 1, 2005, aged 91.
