= Marquis Xian of Jin =

Eighth ruler of the state of Jin

Marquis Xian of Jin 晉獻侯

Marquis of Jin
- Reign: 822–812 BC
- Predecessor: Marquis Xi
- Successor: Marquis Mu
- Died: 812 BC
- Issue: Marquis Mu
Names
- Ancestral name: Jī (姬); Given name: Jí (籍) or Sū (穌)
Posthumous name
- Marquis Xian (獻侯)
- House: Ji
- Dynasty: Jin
- Father: Marquis Xi

Marquis Xian of Jin (Chinese: 晉獻侯; pinyin: Jìn Xiàn Hóu), personal name Ji Ji or Ji Su, was a marquis of the Jin state. He was preceded by his father, Marquis Xi, and succeeded by his son, Marquis Mu.

Marquis Xian of Jin House of Ji Cadet branch of the House of Ji Died: 812 BC
Regnal titles
Preceded by Marquis Xi of Jin	Marquis of Jin; 822–812 BC	Succeeded by Marquis Mu of Jin
