= Marquis Ai of Jin =

Ruler of the state of Jin

Marquis Ai of Jin 晉哀侯

Marquis of Jin
- Reign: 718–709 BC
- Predecessor: Ji Xi
- Successor: Marquis Xiaozi
- Died: 709 BC
- Issue: Marquis Xiaozi
Names
- Ancestral name: Jī (姬); Given name: Guāng (光)
Posthumous name
- Marquis Ai (哀侯)
- House: Ji
- Dynasty: Jin
- Father: Ji Xi

Marquis Ai of Jin (Chinese: 晉哀侯; pinyin: Jìn Āi Hóu), personal name Ji Guang, was a marquis of the Jin state. He reigned from 718 BC to 709 BC.

In 710 BC, Marquis Ai attacked a small state south of Jin known as Xingting (陘廷). The next year, Xingting, allied with Duke Wu of Quwo, sacked Yi (翼), the capital of Jin. Duke Wu of Quwo enlisted the help of his half-uncle, Viscount Wu of Han, to kill the escaping Marquis Ai. The Jin people then supported Marquis Ai's son, Marquis Xiaozi, as the next ruler of Jin.

Marquis Ai of Jin House of Ji Cadet branch of the House of Ji Died: 709 BC
Regnal titles
| Preceded by Marquis E of Jin | Marquis of Jin; 717–709 BC | Succeeded by Marquis Xiaozi of Jin |
