= Duke Zhao of Jin =

Chinese ruler of Jin from 531 to 526 BC

Duke Zhao of Jin 晉昭公

Duke of Jin
- Reign: 531–526 BC
- Predecessor: Duke Ping
- Successor: Duke Qing
- Died: 526 BC
- Issue: Duke Qing
Names
- Ancestral name: Jī (姬); Given name: Yí (夷)
Posthumous name
- Duke Zhao (昭公)
- House: Ji
- Dynasty: Jin
- Father: Duke Ping

Duke Zhao of Jin (Chinese: 晉昭公; pinyin: Jìn Zhāo Gōng), personal name Ji Yi, was a duke of the Jin state, reigning from 531 BC to 526 BC. He succeeded his father, Duke Ping of Jin, who died in 532 BC.

Duke Zhao reigned for six years and died in 526 BC. During his reign, the state's political and military affairs were increasingly dominated by six powerful clans: Han (韓), Zhao (趙), Wei (魏), Fan (范), Zhonghang (中行), and Zhi (智). He was succeeded by his son, Duke Qing.

Duke Zhao of Jin House of Ji Cadet branch of the House of Ji Died: 526 BC
Regnal titles
Preceded by Duke Ping of Jin	Duke of Jin; 531–526 BC	Succeeded by Duke Qing of Jin
