= Duke Cheng of Jin =

Ruler of the state of Jin

Duke Cheng of Jin 晉成公

Duke of Jin
- Reign: 606–600 BC
- Predecessor: Duke Ling
- Successor: Duke Jing
- Died: 600 BC
- Issue: Duke Jing
Names
- Ancestral name: Jī (姬); Given name: Hēitún (黑臀)
Posthumous name
- Duke Cheng (成公)
- House: Ji
- Dynasty: Jin
- Father: Duke Wen
- Mother: Princess of Zhou

Duke Cheng of Jin (Chinese: 晉成公; pinyin: Jìn Chéng Gōng), personal name Ji Heitun, was from 606 to 600 BC the duke of the Jin state. He was the youngest son of Duke Wen, and succeeded his nephew Duke Ling, who was killed by Zhao Chuan (趙穿). Zhao Dun (Viscount Xuan of Zhao) and Zhao Chuan then installed Duke Cheng on the Jin throne.

During the seven years of Duke Cheng's reign, the Jin state attacked the states of Zheng, Chu, Qin, and Chen.

Duke Cheng died in 600 BC and was succeeded by his son, Duke Jing.

Duke Cheng of Jin House of Ji Cadet branch of the House of Ji Died: 600 BC
Regnal titles
Preceded by Duke Ling of Jin	Duke of Jin; 606–600 BC	Succeeded by Duke Jing of Jin
