= Marquess Cheng of Zhao =

Marquess of Zhao from 374 BCE to 350 BCE

Marquess Cheng of Zhao 趙成侯

Marquess of Zhao
- Reign: 374–350 BCE
- Predecessor: Marquess Jing
- Successor: Marquess Su
- Born: Unknown
- Died: 350 BCE
Names
- Ancestral name: Yíng (嬴); Lineage name: Zhào (趙); Given name: Zhòng (種)
Posthumous name
- Marquess Cheng (成侯)
- House: Ying
- Dynasty: Zhao

Chinese name
- Traditional Chinese: 趙成侯
- Simplified Chinese: 赵成侯
Transcriptions
Standard Mandarin
- Hanyu Pinyin: Zhào Chéng Hóu

Marquess Cheng of Zhao (?–350 BCE), personal name Zhao Zhong, was a marquess of the Zhao state. He was the son of Marquess Jing, whom he succeeded.

In 372 BCE, Marquess Cheng built a wooden lookout tower, known as a "tantai" (檀臺) at Xingdi (modern-day Xingtai City, Hebei Province) facing the other Warring States; because of the structure, the location later took on the name "Xingtai". General Pang Juan of the Wei state brought troops and surrounded the Zhao capital Handan in 353 BCE in preparation for an attack. The Qi state sent envoys Tian Ji and Sun Bin along with troops to assist the Zhao state and they later defeated the forces of Wei at the Battle of Guiling. Afterwards, in the twenty-fourth year of his reign (351 BCE), Marquess Cheng forced King Hui of Wei into a humiliating peace treaty at the Zhang River near Handan.
