= Dai (Warring States period) =

Northern Chinese nation (228-222 BCE)

- Traditional Chinese: 代國
- Simplified Chinese: 代国
- Literal meaning: State of Dai
Transcriptions
Standard Mandarin
- Hanyu Pinyin: Dàiguó
- Wade–Giles: Tai-kuo

The ruins of ancient Dai in Yu County, Hebei.

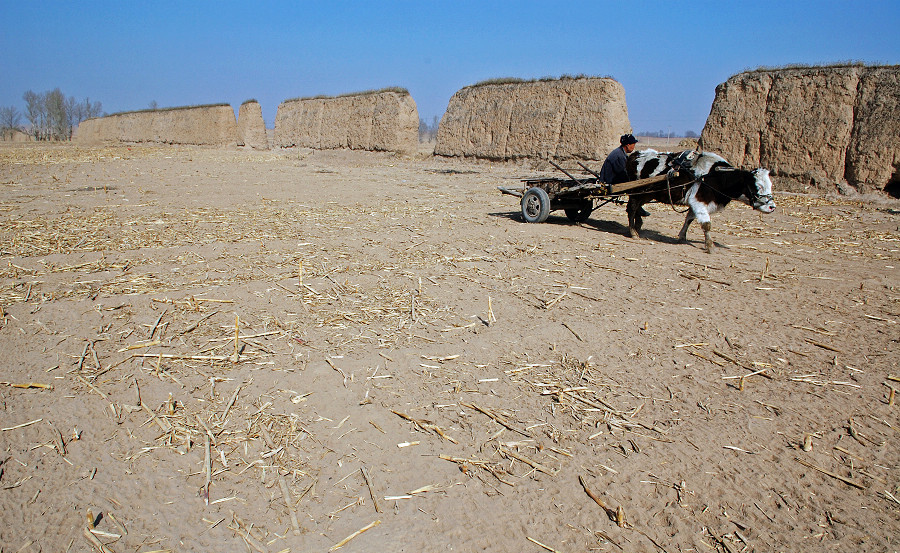
The ruins of ancient Dai in Yu County, Hebei.

Dai was a short-lived state from 228 BC to 222 BC during the Warring States period of Chinese history. Prince Zhao Jia, older brother of King Youmiu of Zhao, fled with the remnant forces to Dai Commandery after the conquest of Zhao and was proclaimed the new king of Zhao. His rump state was conquered in the year 222 BC by Qin during its campaigns against Yan. The ruins of his capital are preserved in present-day Yu County, Hebei, as "Dai King City" (代王城).

== Legacy ==
During the rebellions towards the end of the Qin dynasty, a Zhao royal named Zhao Xie was installed as the King of Zhao by Zhao officials Zhang Er (Zhang Ao's father) and Chen Yu in 208 BCE. Upon the final defeat of Qin in 206 BCE, Xiang Yu split Zhao into Dai (代) and Changshan (常山) and made Zhao Xie and Zhang Er kings of Dai and Changshan, respectively. Chen Yu, who had a personal feud with Zhang Er, managed to defeat Zhang Er and seize his domain. He then restored the Kingdom of Zhao to Zhao Xie, who gave the title of King of Dai to Chen Yu. However, Chen Yu never moved to his domain, instead choosing to serve Zhao Xie as a general. Both Zhao Xie and Chen Yu were eventually defeated and killed by Han forces under Han Xin and Zhang Er in 204 BCE, with their territories annexed by Han.

When the Han dynasty was founded, Liu Bang took back most of the kingships/principalities from the vassal kings of family names different from Liu. He created his son Liu Heng as the Prince of Dai in 196 BCE.

== See also ==
- King of Dai
- Zhao Jia
