= Marquis Su =

Marquis Su may refer to:

- Marquis Xian of Jin (died 812 BC), or Marquis Su according to recent archaeological evidence
- Marquess Su of Zhao (died 326 BC)

== Three Kingdoms period and Jin dynasty ==
- Cheng Yu (141–220), Cao Wei politician
- Jia Xu (147–223), Cao Wei politician
- Zhang Ji (Derong) (died 223), Cao Wei politician
- Jia Kui (general) (174–228), Cao Wei politician
- Xin Pi (died 235), Cao Wei politician
- Gu Yong (168–243), Eastern Wu politician
- Wang Guan (Three Kingdoms) (died 260), Cao Wei politician
- Yu Yi (305–345), Jin dynasty general
