= Queen Daochang of Zhao =

Ancient chinese queen

Queen Daochang of Zhao (Chinese: 趙悼倡后; pinyin: Zhào Dàochànghòu, died 228 BC), also known as Queen Mianchang of Zhao, (Chinese: 趙悼倡后; pinyin: zhào dàochànghòu; Wade–Giles: zhao^{4}dao^{4} chang^{4}hou^{4}) Lady Chang (倡姬; Chàngjī; 'Singing Lady'), or Queen Chang (倡后; Chànghòu; 'Singing Queen'), was the consort of King Daoxiang of Zhao. She was the concubine of the king. She was the mother of King Youmiu, and given the title of Queen Dowager when he became king. She had an affair with a high official and accepted bribes, and has been described as a bad role model in traditional Chinese history writing.

== Early life ==
Queen Daochang was originally a courtesan from Handan. She later married a kinsman (宗族) of the Zhao royal family and became a widow after her husband's death. King Daoxiang married her because of her beauty. Li Mu persuaded King Daoxiang not to take her as his concubine on the grounds that the woman was of improper origin and disrupting the clan bloodline would lead to the overthrow of the country, but King Daoxiang refused to listen.

At first, King Daoxiang and his previous queen had Zhao Jia, who was established as the crown prince. After advocating, she became favored by King Daoxiang, and conspired to frame Zhao Jia for committing crimes, so that he could be deposed as the crown prince. King Zhao Daoxiang then made her the queen, and her son Zhao Qian was the prince.

== As Queen Dowager ==
In 236 BC, King Daoxiang died, and Zhao Qian succeeded to the throne as King Youmiu. Zhao's behavior became even more wanton after his death. She often had affairs with Lord Chunping (春平侯), accepted bribes from Qin, and killed the famous general Li Mu.

But historical records have different opinions on the cause of Li Mu's death.

== Death and aftermath ==
In 228 BC, Qin general Wang Jian led his army to attack Handan, the capital of Zhao, and captured Qian, king of Zhao. Officials of the State of Zhao resented Queen Zhao Dao for mistreating the country, so they killed her and exterminated her clan, and established Zhao Jia as the acting king in Dai County.

In 222 BC, Wang Ben took advantage of the destruction of Yan State and turned to attack Dai County, captured Jia of Dai, and Zhao State was completely destroyed.
