= Battle of Maling =

Battle in 342 BC

Coordinates: 35.8858°N 115.3975°E

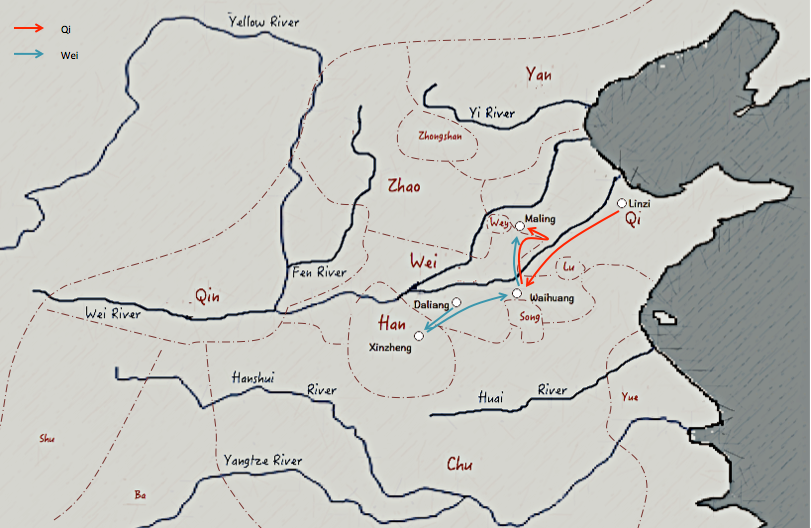
Date	342 BC
Location	Dazhangjia Town (大張家鎮), Shen County (莘縣), Henan Province
Result	Qi Victory

Belligerents
State of Qi	State of Wei

Commanders and leaders
Tian Ji; Sun Bin	Pang Juan †; Crown Prince Shen (executed)

Strength
120,000	100,000 cavalry and infantry

Casualties and losses
2,100	100,000 dead

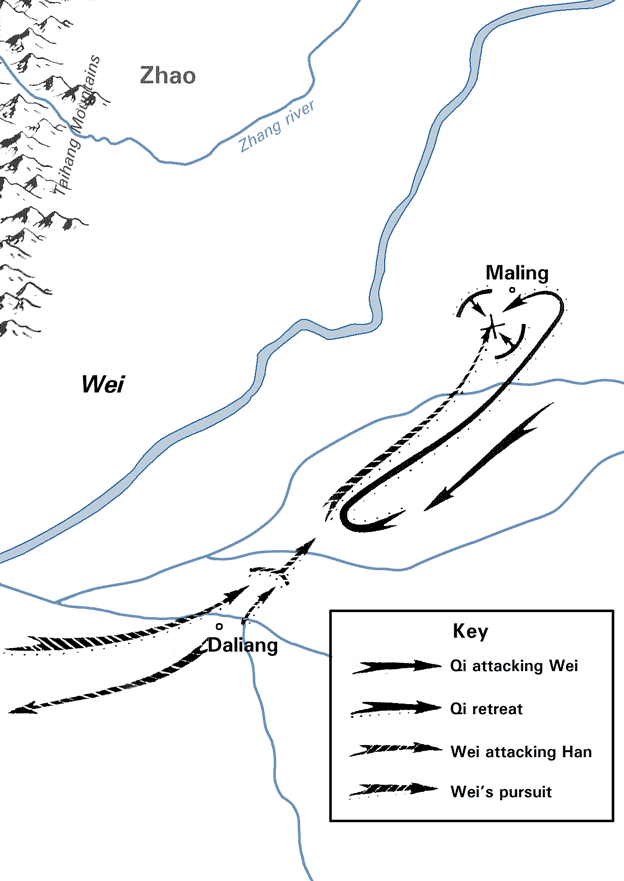
Battle of Maling in 342 BC

The Battle of Maling (Chinese: 馬陵之戰) took place in Maling, currently Dazhangjia Town (大張家鎮), Shen County (莘县), Henan Province, in 342 BC during the Warring States period (476–221 BC). The combatants were the State of Qi, who fought on behalf of the State of Han, and the State of Wei. This battle is well recorded in history texts and is famous for the tactics of Sun Bin, known as the "Tactic of Missing Stoves", in which one side is led to underestimate the other by creating an illusion of soldiers running away from the enemy army.

In 342 BC, the state of Wei attacked the state of Han, and Han turned to its ally Qi for help. Sun Bin advised King Wei of Qi to provide military aid for Han, but only send out troops when the army of Wei had been depleted after prolonged fighting in order to preserve their own strength whilst garnering respect from Han.

Han was misled to believe that they could rely on the army of their ally Qi, and thus fought without reserve. After a year of resistance, Han was no longer able to resist and asked for help from Qi a second time. Instead of sending troops to save Han directly, Sun Bin suggested they should aim for the capital of Wei, Daliang.

When King Hui of Wei learned of the attack, he had to order Wei General Pang Juan to retreat in order to defend against the oncoming army of Qi. Pang Juan was incensed at the news, because he was only days away from taking the capital of Han. King Hui of Wei appointed Prince Shen of Wei as chief commander and Pang Juan as commander, and ordered an army of 100,000 to mobilize against Qi.

Learning from the Battle of Guiling, Pang Juan ordered his troops to go around the Qi troops, to avoid getting ambushed on the main path. Pang Juan also ordered his troops to make haste to the capital, before Qi could set up any effective ambushes. Instead of rushing and trying to ambush the high morale Wei troops, Sun Bin decided to let a great majority of his troops rest. These Qi troops were ordered to move slowly back into Qi and prepare equipment for an ambush when needed. Sun Bin took a smaller force to face Pang Juan. Once the two forces drew close to each other, Sun Bin immediately ordered a retreat.

In order to mislead his enemy, Sun Bin ordered his soldiers to make less stoves (cookfires) day by day. On the first day, Qi had enough stoves for 100,000 people; on the second day, there were stoves for only 50,000 people. On the third day, there were only stoves for an army of 20,000. As Pang Juan saw this, he judged that the soldiers of Qi were deserting their army and decided to pursue the Qi army with a small elite cavalry unit. As the Qi army retreated into their own territory, Sun Bin ordered his troops to abandon some of their heavy artillery. This further gave the impression of a state of confusion amongst the Qi army. When the Qi army arrived at Maling, Sun Bin noticed a heavily wooded and narrow pass that could be used for ambush. Estimating the arrival of Pang Juan around nightfall, he ordered his men to cut down a tree, remove its bark, and carve the words "Pang Juan shall die in Malingdao, under this tree" on its trunk. This was a proverb spoken by the teacher of both Sun Bin and Pang Juan, Guiguzi (both had been in the same class).

Pang Juan had moved to Malingdao, and when he saw the warning message, he paid no attention, instead ordering the words to be scraped off. The army advanced when suddenly, a flush of Qi troops surrounded the Wei. In the darkness, Qi crossbowmen managed to shoot down many of the Wei soldiers, before the rest of soldiers charged in. The Wei troops did not expect Qi to still have so many troops under their command and were quickly overrun. Pang Juan, sensing his end was near, committed suicide. In some versions, Pang Juan was among the first of his troops to be shot to death.

After the death of Pang Juan, Prince Shen was captured by Qi. The power of the state of Wei decreased considerably after this battle.

== Sources ==
- Records of the Grand Historian Sima Qian
