= Sun Bin =

Chinese general and writer (d. 316 BC)

- 孫臏
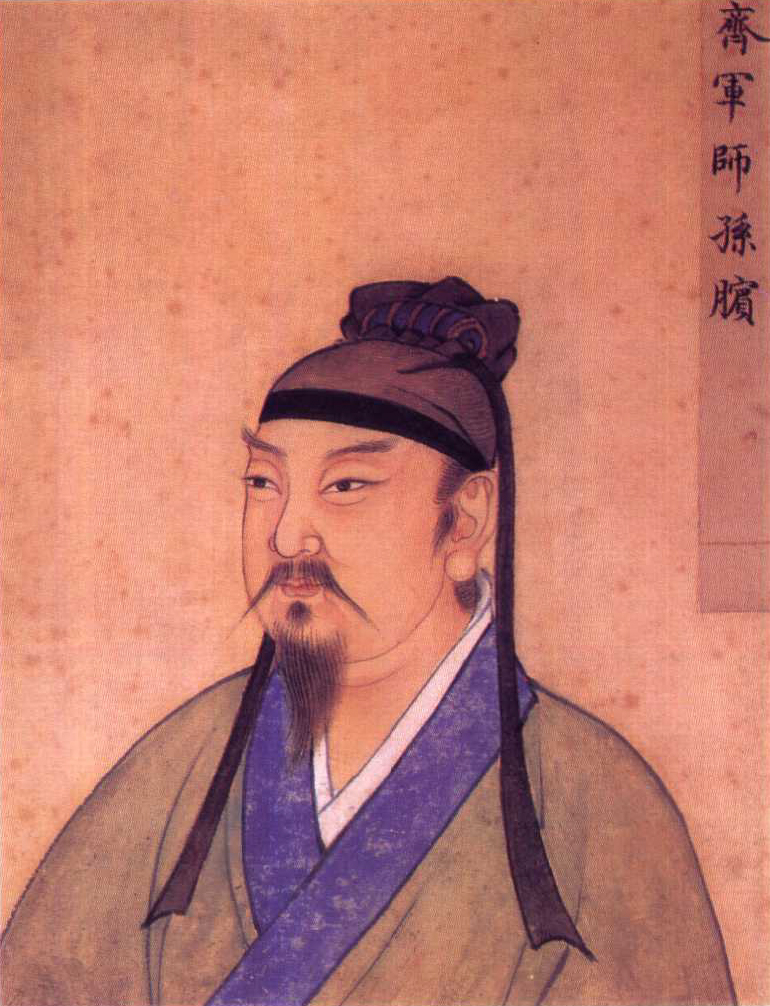
- Sun Bin
- Died: 316 BC
- Military career
- Allegiance: Wei (former); Qi
- Conflicts: Battle of Guiling; Battle of Maling

Sun Bin
- Traditional Chinese: 孫臏
- Simplified Chinese: 孙膑
Transcriptions
Standard Mandarin
- Hanyu Pinyin: Sūn Bìn
- Wade–Giles: Sun Pin

Sun Bin (traditional Chinese: 孫臏; simplified Chinese: 孙膑; pinyin: Sūnbìn; Cantonese Yale: syun1ban3; 382 – 316 BC) was a Chinese general, military strategist, and writer who lived during the Warring States period of Chinese history. A supposed descendant of Sun Tzu, Sun was tutored in military strategy by the hermit Guiguzi. He was accused of treason by Pang Juan while serving Wei and punished by being branded and crippled. Sun escaped and became a strategist and commander for Qi, defeating Wei at the Battle of Guiling and the Battle of Maling; Pang was killed at Maling. Sun's Art of War with the Yinqueshan Han Slips were discovered in 1972 after going missing for at least 1400 years.

== Life ==
=== Early life and service in Wei ===
Sun Bin was allegedly a descendant of Sun Tzu. Sun Bin excelled while studying military strategy under the hermit Guiguzi; he could recite The Art of War and identified by Guiguzi as a role model for other students. Pang Juan, a fellow student, became Sun's blood brother. Pang left to be a Wei general, and built a reputation through a few victories. Sun continued his studies before accepting a Wei recruitment offer to join Pang. Pang considered Sun to be more talented and knowledgeable, and became jealous.

King Hui of Wei sentenced Sun to death after Sun was framed for treason by Pang. Pang convinced King Hui to commute the sentence; Sun was branded and crippled by having his kneecaps removed. Pang attempted to entice Sun to compile a book on military strategy with good treatment, with the intent of killing Sun afterwards. Eventually, Sun discovered Pang's intentions and feigned insanity. As a test, Pang locked Sun in a sty where the latter ate animal faeces, calling them delicious. When Pang lowered his guard, Sun escaped with the help of Qi diplomats.

=== Service in Qi ===
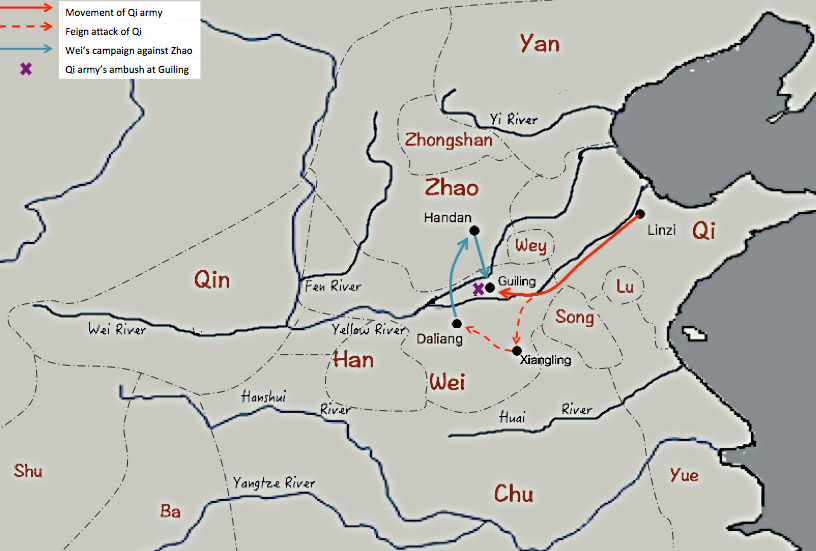
Map showing Battle of Guiling

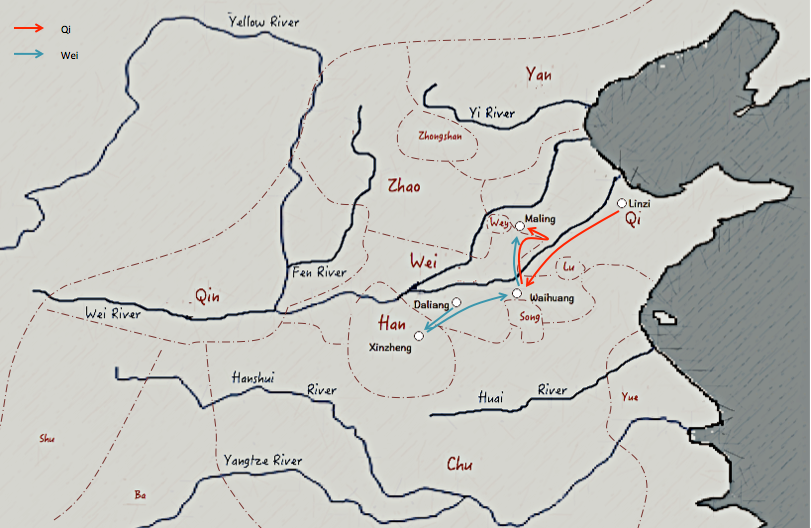
Map showing Battle of Maling

Sun became a retainer (guest) to General Tian Ji in Qi. Sun came to the attention of King Wei of Qi during a racing competition. Sun noticed that while Tian Ji had good horses, he regularly lost the races against the King. Since the races were best-of-three, Sun advised Tian Ji to match his worst horse against the King's best, his best horse against the King's second-best, and his second-best against the King's worst horse. Sun's advice allowed Tian to win two of the three rounds. Sun entered King Wei's service on Tian's recommendation. King Wei appointed Sun as chief military advisor and Tian's deputy. Sun declined appointment as a commander since he could not ride a horse, due to his handicap, which would harm troop morale.

In 354 BC, a Wei army under Pang attacked Zhao and besieged the Zhao capital city of Handan. Zhao requested help from Qi, which dispatched an army led by Tian and Sun. The Qi army attacked the Wei capital city of Daliang (present-day Kaifeng) according to Sun's strategy of "besieging Wei to rescue Zhao". The Wei army withdrew from Handan to defend Daliang, and was ambushed and defeated by the Qi the Battle of Guiling.

In 342 BC, a Wei army led by Pang attacked Han, a Qi ally. Again, a Qi army deployed against the Wei led by Tian and using Sun's strategy. The Qi army feigned defeat in a series of skirmishes, while reducing the number of cooking stoves it used. The pursuing Wei overestimated Qi casualties based on the shrinking number of marks left by the stoves. At the Battle of Maling, the Qi ambushed and defeated the Wei in a narrow valley. The crown prince of Wei was captured, and Pang was killed. According to folklore, Sun carved "Pang Juan dies under this tree" on a tree in the ambush area. When Pang arrived, he lit a torch to examine the carving and was fired upon by the Qi using the light as a target; Pang was hit by multiple arrows and then committed suicide.

Sun retired due to politics in the royal court. He lived as a hermit in the later part of his life.

== Works ==
Sun wrote the military treatise Sun Bin's Art of War (孫臏兵法). The book was believed to be lost after the Han dynasty. Some historians doubted its existence as evidence was limited to references in post-contemporary texts. The Yinqueshan Han Slips scroll fragments, recovered in 1972 from a tomb in Linyi, Shandong, contained text from the Sun Bin's Art of War. 16 chapters have been identified; historical texts attributed 89 chapters to the work.

Sun Bin's Art of War includes sections related to the Battles of Guiling and Maling. A major difference between Sun Tzu's earlier The Art of War and Sun Bin's Art of War is in siege warfare. The former advises against it, and the latter - reflecting developments in the later stages of the Warring States period - contains advice for attacking besieged cities.

== Legacy ==
Sun sometimes appears as a Menshen (door god) in Chinese and Taoist temples, usually paired with Pang.

His rivalry with Pang is portrayed in the 2011 film The Warring States.

Sun is one of the 32 historical figures who appear as special characters in the video game Romance of the Three Kingdoms XI by Koei.
