= Baile (town) =

Baile 白乐镇
- Town
- Báilè Zhèn
- Location in Hebei Location in China
- Coordinates: 39°57′25″N 114°52′11″E
- Country: People's Republic of China
- Province: Hebei
- Prefecture-level city: Zhangjiakou
- County: Yu

Area
  - Total: 67.70 km^{2} (26.14 sq mi)

Population (2010)
  - Total: 16,029
  - Density: 236.7/km^{2} (613/sq mi)
- Time zone: UTC+8 (China Standard)

Baile (Chinese: 白乐镇; pinyin: Báilè Zhèn) is a town located in Yu County, Zhangjiakou, Hebei, China. According to the 2010 census, Baile had a population of 16,029, including 8,280 males and 7,749 females. The population was distributed as follows: 3,328 people aged under 14, 10,586 people aged between 15 and 64, and 2,115 people aged over 65.

== See also ==
- List of township-level divisions of Hebei
