= Tian Ji =

4th-century BC Qi State military general

- 田忌
- Military career
- Allegiance: Qi
- Conflicts: Battle of Guiling; Battle of Maling

Tian Ji (Chinese: 田忌; pinyin: Tián Jì), courtesy name Qi (齐), was a military general of the Qi state during the early Warring States period (4th century BC) of Chinese history. Tian Ji met Sun Bin and recommended him to King Wei of Qi as a military strategist. Tian Ji commanded the Qi armies in the Battle of Guiling and Battle of Maling, scoring victories against the Wei state with help and guidance from Sun Bin.

== Biography ==
Tian Ji was descended from an aristocratic clan based in the State of Qi and was later appointed a military general by King Wei of Qi. In 340 BC, Sun Bin arrived in the State of Qi as a refugee from the State of Wei. Tian Ji met Sun Bin and was so impressed with Sun's expertise in military strategy that he kept Sun at his residence as a retainer (门客). Once, Tian Ji was invited to participate in a horse-racing event hosted by the king and Sun Bin proposed a strategy for Tian Ji to win. Tian used his inferior horse to race with the king's best horse, his average horse to race with the king's inferior horse, and his best horse to race with the king's average horse, winning the latter two out of the three races. The king was impressed by Tian Ji's victory and Tian told the king that he won the race after following Sun Bin's suggestion. Tian recommended Sun Bin to the king and the king appointed Sun as a military strategist and advisor.

In 354 BC, Wei attacked the State of Zhao, with Pang Juan leading the Wei forces. Zhao requested help from Qi whereupon King Wei of Qi ordered Tian Ji and Sun Bin to lead an army to reinforce Zhao. Sun Bin proposed the strategy of "Besieging Wei to rescue Zhao", and Tian Ji followed the plan, ordering an attack on Wei, forcing Pang Juan to turn back to save Wei, and effectively lifting the siege on Zhao. In 341 BC, Wei attacked the State of Han with Pang Juan commanding the Wei army. Han was an ally of Qi such that Qi responded by sending an army to reinforce Han. Sun Bin was appointed as commander-in-chief of the Qi army this time, with Tian Ji as his deputy. The Qi army scored a major victory in the ensuing Battle of Maling in 342 BC, which culminated in a crushing defeat for Wei and the death of Pang Juan.

Tian Ji was not on good terms with the Qi chancellor Zou Ji who disparaged Tian in front of King Wei. Unable to clear his name, Tian fled from Qi and sought refuge in the State of Chu. He was invited back to Qi and reinstated in his former office after King Xuan ascended the throne of Qi.

== Tian Ji’s Horse Racing Strategy ==
=== Background ===
Tian Ji’s Horse Racing Strategy originated from a well-known ancient Chinese story from The Records of the Grand Historian. Tian Ji was a military general of the Qi state during the early Warring States period of Chinese history. The story is about a horse riding game between Tian Ji and the king of the Qi Kingdom, and how Tian Ji won the horse racing game under the guidance of a military strategist, Sun Bin, with all his horses less competitive than the king. In the original story, Tian Ji was aware of the king’s strategy and changed the sequence of his horse to win the game. However, in the later edition, where the original story was developed into a game theory strategy, players are not aware of other players’ decisions in advance when they are making decisions, which add more randomness and fairness to the game. Our game description and solution are based on the later edition.

=== The game ===
Tian Ji and the king of the Qi Kingdom choose three horses and classify them as good, better, and best. For horses of the same grade, King Qi's horses are better than Tian Ji's horses. Both parties cannot know the other party's decision in advance before making a decision, so it can be regarded as choosing a strategy at the same time. Each horse can only participate in one round. The winner of each round gets 1 point, the loser gets -1 point, and the result of the game is the sum of three game scores.

- Draw the normal form matrix of this game. Be sure to include all key elements of a strategic game.
- Suggest a strategy that the King of Qi should adopt.

=== Solution ===
Suppose we use E, B, and G to represent the “fastest,” “fast,” and “slow” horses. Here is the strategy for both players(Please refer to the image):

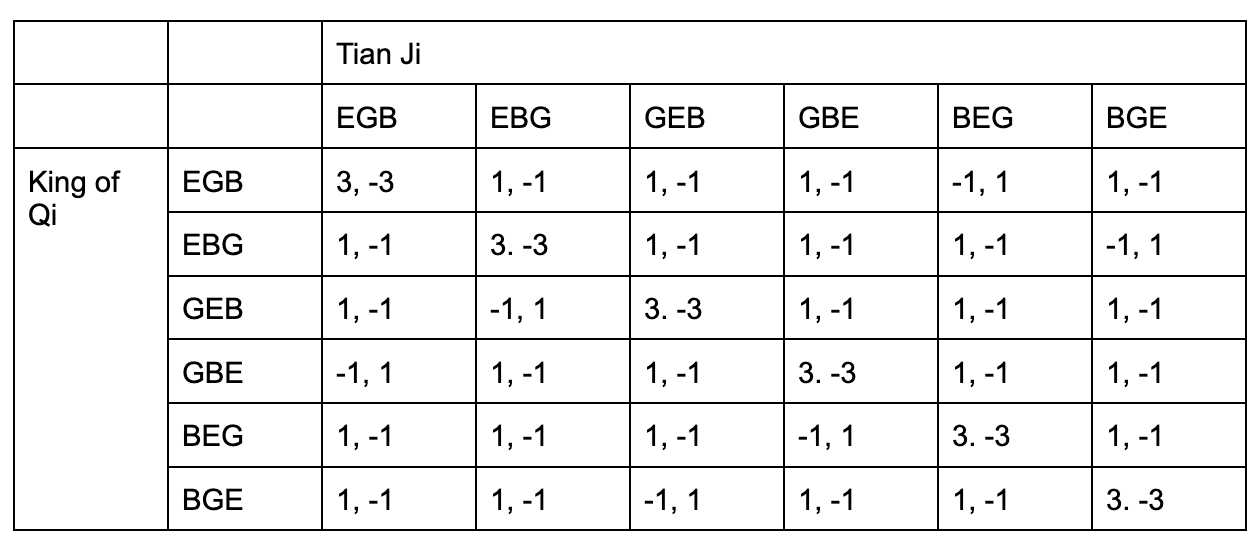
Tian Ji’s Horse Racing Strategy

For each of the strategies King of Qi made, Tian Ji can choose the corresponding strategy bringing him the maximum benefit:.

- If the King of Qi chose EGB, Tian Ji could choose BEG.
- If the King of Qi chose EBG, Tian Ji could choose BGE.
- If the King of Qi chose GEB, Tian Ji could choose EBG.
- If the King of Qi chose GBE, Tian Ji could choose EGB.
- If the King of Qi chose BEG, Tian Ji could choose GBE.
- If the King of Qi chose BGE, Tian Ji could choose GEB.

From the above analysis, we can find that if Tian Ji knows the strategy that the King of Qi is making, he can choose the corresponding and only winning strategy to win the King of Qi. For example, if the King of Qi chooses EGB and Tian Ji knows that, then he can choose BEG to win. However, for the game, none of these are mutual best responses, so there is no pure Nash equilibrium strategy. But there exists a mixed Nash equilibrium strategy.

The hypothesis of the original story is that Tian Ji knew the strategy that the King of Qi would choose. What if Tian Ji did not know that? Then we will discuss how both of them can change their strategies. For the king of Qi, his dominant strategy is to choose randomly. The reason is that no matter which strategy he chooses, the probability for Tian Ji to win is 1/6. For Tian Ji, his dominant strategy is also to choose randomly since the probability for the king of Qi to win is 5/6. Therefore, for both of them, the dominant strategy is to choose randomly.
