= King Youmiao =

King of Chinese state of Zhao from 235 to 228 BC

King Youmiao of Zhao 趙幽繆王

King of Zhao
- Reign: 235–228 BCE
- Predecessor: King Daoxiang
- Successor: Zhao Jia (as King of Dai)
- Born: c. 245 BCE
- Died: Unknown
- Spouse: Unknown
Names
- Ancestral name: Yíng (嬴); Lineage name: Zhào (趙); Given name: Qiān (遷)
Posthumous name
- King Youmiao (幽繆王) or King Youmin (幽愍王)
- House: Ying
- Dynasty: Zhao
- Father: King Daoxiang
- Mother: Queen Daochang

King Youmiao of Zhao (Chinese: 趙幽繆王; r. 235–228 BCE), personal name Zhao Qian, was a king of the Zhao state.

The younger son of King Daoxiang and Queen Daochang, King Youmiao was nevertheless able to succeed to the Zhao throne before his elder brother Zhao Jia due to his mother Chang Hou's intervention. He inherited a country that was in danger of being conquered by the Qin state, as it had been since a defeat at the Battle of Changping in 260 BCE.

The state of Zhao, however, was able to survive thanks to the services of General Li Mu, who successfully repelled Qin attempts at exploiting the situation. The Qin devised a scheme to get rid of him; through bribing a close confidante of King Youmiao, the courtier Guo Kai (郭開), Li Mu was arrested and executed on suspicion of treason.

Without Li Mu, Zhao's defenses were unable to resist the might of Qin. In 228 BCE, Qin forces under the leadership of Wang Jian captured the Zhao capital of Handan. King Youmiao surrendered and was then exiled to Fangling (modern-day northwestern Hubei). Zhao Jia then took the throne as King of Dai (代王) and reigned over a rump state in Zhao's far north.

In King Youmiao's 1st Year, 235 BC, Zhao fortified the city of Bairen (柏人). In his 2nd Year, 234 BC, Qin General Huan Yi (桓齮) attacked Zhao at Wucheng (武城), defeating and killing Zhao general Hu Zhe (扈輒), and beheading 100,000 people. In his 3rd Year, 233 BC, Qin general Huan Yi attacked Chili (赤麗) and Yi'an (宜安), Zhao general Li Mu lead an army to repel them at Feixia (肥下), he was successful in defeating Huan Yi, Li Mu was made Lord of Wu'an (武安君). In his 4th Year, 232 BC, Qin launched a large military campaign against Zhao, 1 army advance to Taiyuan (太原), and another to Ye (鄴), capturing Langmeng (狼孟), the Qin army attacked Fanwu (番吾), Li Mu successfully repelled the Qin army. In his 5th Year, 231 BC, there was a major earthquake in the Dai (代) region. In his 6th Year, 230 BC, there was a major famine in Zhao. In his 7th Year, 229 BC, Qin Generals Wang Jian, Yang Duanhe, Qiang Hui, and Li Xin attack Zhao, Zhao generals Li Mu and Sima Shang led the army to resist, Li Mu was executed and Sima Shang (司馬尚) relieved of his duties, replaced by Zhao Cong (趙怱) and Yan Ju (顏聚), a general of Qi, Zhao Cong was defeated and Yan Ju Fled. In October of his 8th Year, 228 BC, Handan fell to Qin.

== Notes ==
- Zhao Guo Shi Gao (Draft History of the Zhao State), Shen Changyun, Zhonghua Book Company, China.
