= Caogoubu Township =

Caogoubu Township 草沟堡乡
- Rural Township
- Cǎogōubǔ Xiāng
- Location in Hebei Location in China
- Coordinates: 39°40′45″N 114°49′16″E
- Country: People's Republic of China
- Province: Hebei
- Prefecture-level city: Zhangjiakou
- County: Yu

Area
  - Total: 464.3 km^{2} (179.3 sq mi)

Population (2010)
  - Total: 9,106
  - Density: 19.61/km^{2} (50.8/sq mi)
- Time zone: UTC+8 (China Standard)

Caogoubu Township (Chinese: 草沟堡乡; pinyin: Cǎogōubǔ Xiāng) is a rural township located in Yu County, Zhangjiakou, Hebei, China. According to the 2010 census, Caogoubu Township had a population of 9,106, including 5,045 males and 4,061 females. The population was distributed as follows: 1,614 people aged under 14, 6,418 people aged between 15 and 64, and 1,074 people aged over 65.

== See also ==
- List of township-level divisions of Hebei
