= Marquess Jing of Zhao =

Marquess Jing of Zhao 趙敬侯

Marquess of Zhao
- Reign: 386–375 BCE
- Predecessor: Duke Wu of Zhao (趙武公)
- Successor: Marquess Cheng
- Born: c. 410 BCE
- Died: 375 BCE
Names
- Ancestral name: Yíng (嬴); Lineage name: Zhào (趙); Given name: Zhāng (章)
Posthumous name
- Marquess Jing (敬侯)
- House: Ying
- Dynasty: Zhao

Chinese name
- Traditional Chinese: 趙敬侯
- Simplified Chinese: 赵敬侯
Transcriptions
Standard Mandarin
- Hanyu Pinyin: Zhào Jìng Hóu

Marquess Jing of Zhao (c. 410-375 BCE), personal name Zhao Zhang, was a ruler of the Zhao state during the Warring states period. He was the son of Marquess Lie of Zhao, the founding monarch of the state (see Partition of Jin). Marquess Jing's uncle, Duke Wu of Zhao (趙武公), ruled as Zhao's ruler until Marquess Jing was of age.

In 386 BCE, the first year of his reign, Marquess Jing moved the Zhao capital from Zhongmou (中牟; modern-day Tangyin County, Henan) to Handan, where two large districts were set up to be in a more secure location. One of these was the administrative district Gongcheng (宮城區) and the other the Dabei commercial area (大北城), and Handan quickly prospered.

In the second year of his reign, Marquess Jing prevailed over the Qi state at a battle that took place in an area situated between modern-day Gaotang County and Chiping County.

Marquess Jing was succeeded by his son, Marquess Cheng.
