= Dashuhua =

Chinese Festival of Lights tradition in Nuanquan Town

Da Shuhua
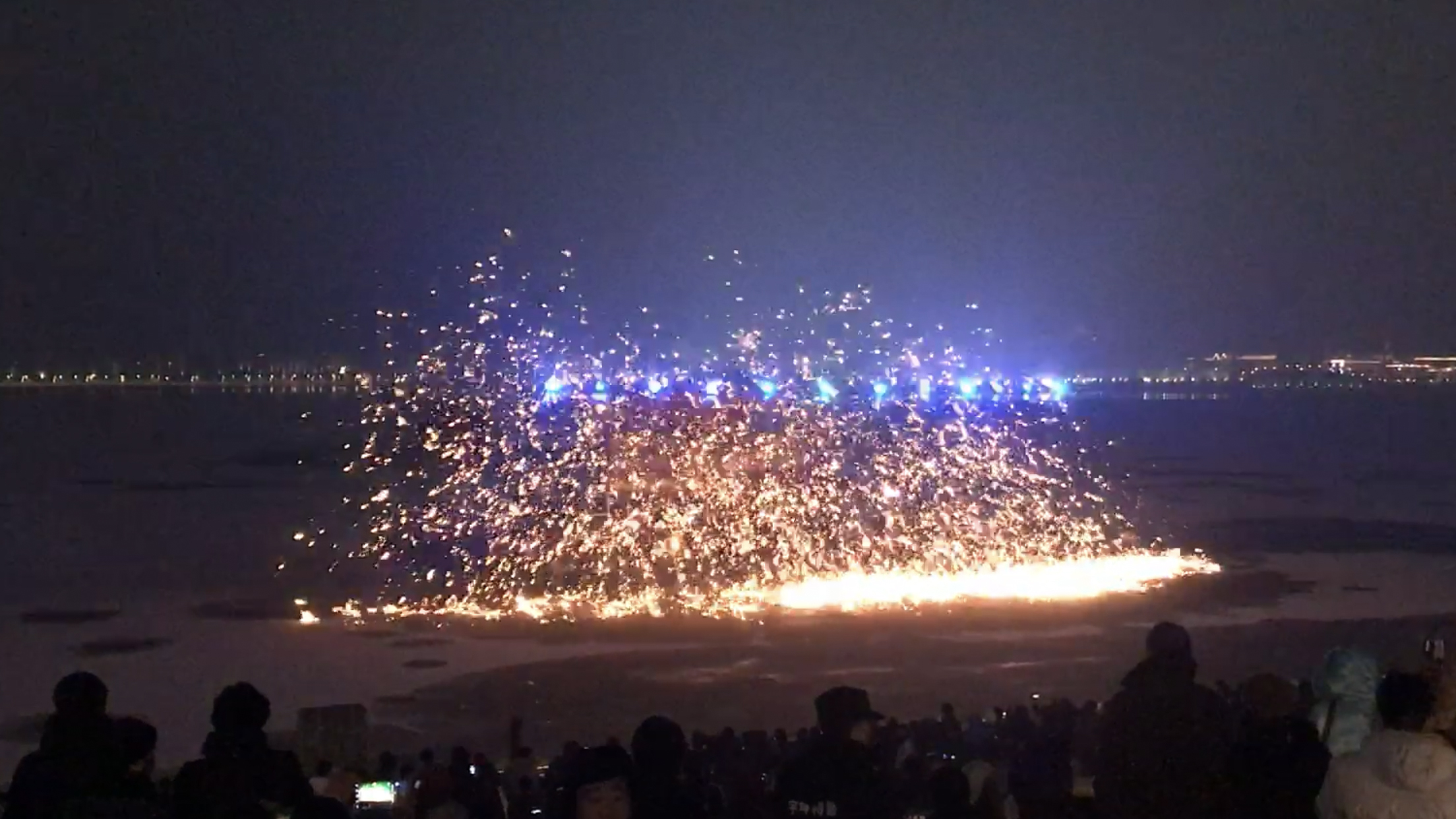
- Blacksmiths threw molten iron to create sparks on February 19th, 2019
- Medium: Visual
- Types: Performing art(visual art)
- Ancestor arts: Local blacksmiths in Nuanquan
- Originating culture: China
- Originating era: Fifteenth century

Da Shuhua or Dashuhua (Chinese: 打树花; pinyin: dǎshùhuā) is a Chinese Festival of Lights tradition in Nuanquan Town, Zhangjiakou, with a history of more than five hundred years. It is shown by throwing molten iron against cold bricks to create showers of sparks which have a similar shape of leafy tree canopy. Da Shuhua has been classified as one of China's significant examples of intangible cultural heritage by UNESCO (United Nations Educational, Scientific and Cultural Organization ), and the provincial intangible cultural heritage in Hebei. It marks the start of the Dragon Boat Festival and also used to celebrate the Lunar New Year in China.

== History ==
=== Etymology ===
“Da Shuhua" is the English term for the art form, literally meaning "forging tree flowers". The blacksmiths in Nuanquan named the art as Da Shuhua because the outcome of it has a shape of the leafy tree canopy. When the blacksmiths throw the molten iron against the wall, the flying sparks will present a look of tree flower.

=== Origins ===
Da Shuhua is found in Nuanquan Township, Yuxian County, located Northwest of Beijing, which was built in the Ming dynasty (1368–1644) as a presidio for Beijing. Nuanquan Town, literally meaning Warm Spring Town, and the name "Nuanquan" came from the fact that there was a hot spring. It is an ancient town surrounded by mountains and has a reputation of "the First Ancient Town of Jiangxi (western area of Beijing)". People have lived in Nuanquan since the Warring States period (475BC–221 BC). There are 20,000 people currently live in Nuanquan, and the historical features and cultural heritages there are well-protected in the process of modernization. The home of Da Shuhua also known as "Hometown of Paper Cutting". Yuxian-style paper cuts combined paper cutting with theatric features and adopts woodblock watermark and Yangliuqing painting technology. The colorful and creative paper cuts are designed for decorating windows, which can enhance the festival atmosphere during the festival season. The wide variety of theatre stages in Yuxian illustrates that local folks love about Chinese Theatre as well, and the theatres were built with delicate porcelain tiles and painted with exquisite fresco.

In ancient times, the Lunar New Year is the busiest time of the year in Nuanquan Town. The rich used expensive fireworks to celebrate the festival with the sounds and sparks of explosions, while the poor could not afford it^{8}. The ironmaking industry in Nuanquan was flourished grounded on the weapon manufacturing, and the blacksmiths there inspired by the flakes of heated iron when they tried to find a cheap way to celebrate the festival. They found that the sparks created by the collision between heated iron with the cold wall have a similar scene of fireworks. Later, the poor collected waste iron and gave to local blacksmiths to perform Da Shuhua as a form of reveling and attracted more and more people who could not afford to buy real fireworks came to watch. The three-day show usually performs in the 15th of the first lunar month, and it develops the tradition that during the Lunar New year, the rich watches fireworks and the poor watches Da Shuhua. At the very beginning, Da Shuhua was performed on a cold wall in Nuanquan. As the population of the audience getting bigger and bigger, local people built a square which is used explicitly for performing Da Shuhua and named it "Tree Flower Square". The future of the art is uncertain because the four remaining artists are all over fifty years old.

=== Tourism ===
The fortress of Xigubao (Chinese: 西古堡) has been listed among the national nonmaterial cultural heritage in 2001 by the State Council of China. Xigubao is located in Nuanquan town, Yuxian county. Both small and large temples in the fortress were built in the Ming dynasty and decorated with ancient fresco.

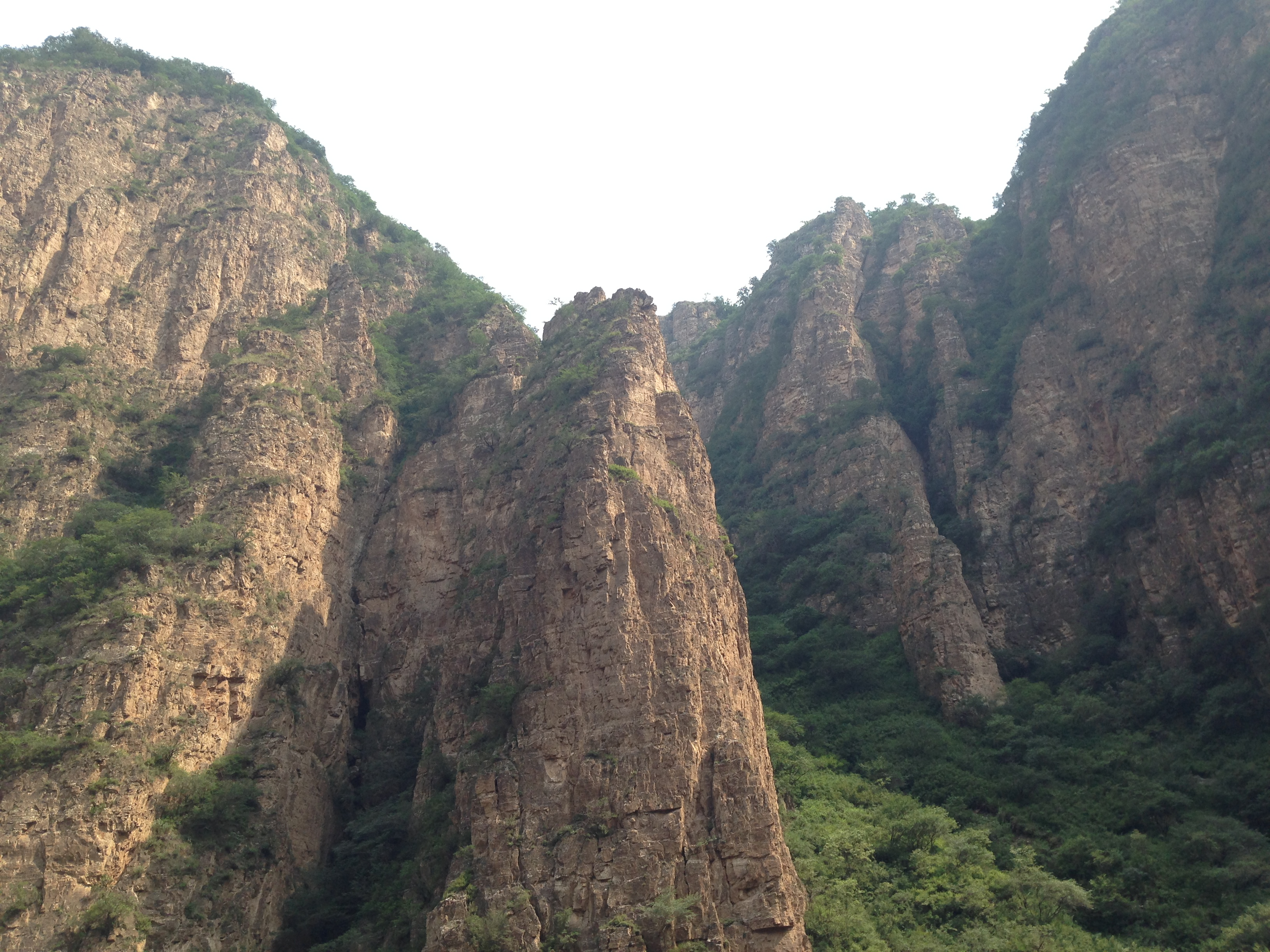
Da Shuhua arose in Yuxian County in 500 years ago.

== Performance process ==
The traditional performing process of Da Shuhua did not change much for more than 500 years. It takes four folk artists to perform and usually takes place in the Tree Flower Square of Nuanquan township. There will be one leader blacksmith, and the other three will assist the leader with managing his iron furnace during the performance. The artists need to collect more than 500 kilograms waste iron and melt them for at least half an hour in a furnace with high heat before the show. The wooden spoon is the primary tool for Da Shuhua, and the production process of it is cumbersome. The raw material of the spoon is willow root. The root needs to be soaked in water for a few days at first, and then blacksmiths will use small fire to dry it to make it anti-burning. The four blacksmiths have to wear straw hats and thick sheepskin coats to protect themselves from the splashing molten iron during performance. Before Dashuhua starts, performances such as dragon lantern dance, lion dance and land boat dance will be performed by folk artists of Nuanquan first. According to the record, during the show, the molten metal will be heated up to 1,600 °C (2,910 °F). The art of Da Shuhua requires skills, power, and courage. When the leader artist scoops up the heavy iron from the furnace with the wooden spoon, the spoon cannot go very deep. Otherwise, the temperature difference between the cold spoon and heated iron will cause an explosion. Then the leader blacksmith throws the spoonful of iron on the cold wall through the burst of strength on his arms and the blast of liquid iron from the wall gives the audience showers of sparks. At the end of the show, the artists will perform a deep kowtow in front of the furnace and pray for happiness and good luck. The danger of Da Shuhua can be reflected from the wounds on those folk artists. The leader blacksmith of the performance team in recent years is Wang De (artist), whose father and grandfather were both blacksmiths. Wang said he suffered a burn on his leg years ago, and it took him two months to recover.

=== Scientific principle ===
The melting point of iron is 1,538 °C (2,800 °F). When blacksmiths heat the iron up to 1,600 °C (2,910 °F) Celsius, the solid iron will melt and turn into liquid iron. The splash of heated liquid iron is an energy transformation process: when the blacksmith throws out the iron from the furnace, kinetic energy is supplied to bulk of the liquid iron that transforms to potential energy at an elevation up the wall, and the residual kinetic energy is responsible for a splashing impact. The explosion of molten iron is essentially an oxidation reaction of finely divided iron droplets combined with scattering upon collision with wall. In addition, carbon impurities in the iron will react with oxygen to produce carbon dioxide and the impact will expose carbon in the molten iron to oxygen to produce sparks. With the same performance process, the higher the carbon amount of the iron, the more sparks can be formed.

== Television drama ==
The first TV series that involved Da Shuhua is called "Story of Yanxi Palace." "Story of Yanxi Palace" is a popular TV series in the summer of 2018. On average, it was being streamed 300 million times a day. The series is talking about harem life during the reign of the Qianlong Emperor (1711–99), an emperor during the Qing dynasty. In this series, Da Shuhua is called "Wan Zi Qian Hong", a Chinese four-character phrase which means "colors of flame" and the noble consort of the Qianlong Emperor invites some folk blacksmiths to perform it for the Emperor's mother to celebrate her birthday. Along with the influence of "Story of Yanxi Palace", the audience awareness of Da Shuhua was improved.

== Book ==
Japanese photographer Rinko Kawauchi's book Halo is a collection of photos of Da Shuhua. It was awarded as one of the notable photo books of 2007, and these photos show clouds of sparks which created by the collision between iron and wall. Kawauchi said in the last pages of Halo: "We still find ourselves yearning to witness beauty. Our ceaseless desire to do so is like a prayer."

== Poem ==
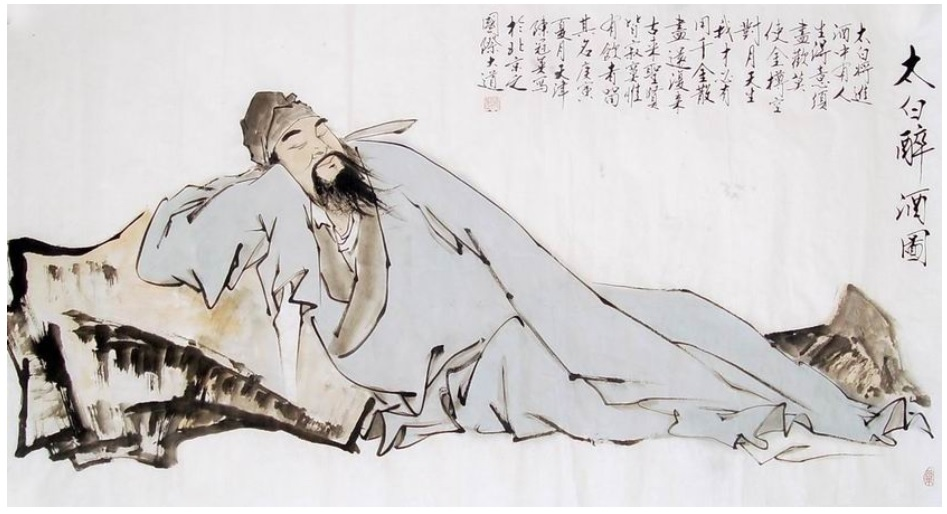
Li Bai, a Chinese poet during the Tang dynasty

The "songs of Qiupu" (Chinese: 秋浦歌十七首) is the earliest record of Da Shuhua. It is a collection of seventeen poems which was written by Li Bai (AD 701–762), a poet during the Tang dynasty (AD 618–907). When Li wrote this poem he was already fifty years old and visiting Qiupu (秋浦). Qiupu is a place in today's Anhui province. During the Tang dynasty, the art that Li Bai recorded is the ancient form of Da Shuhua, which has the similar performance process and outcome with Da Shuhua. The verse which describes the view of the ancient show is in the fourteenth poem of "songs of Qiupu", "炉火照天地，红星乱紫烟。". It translated to "Their furnace fire illumes both earth and sky, Red parks spiking its purple smoke awry." by Andrew Wong, which states showers of sparks of the art created by the ancient blacksmiths. The difference of the outcomes between Da Shuhua and the predecessor of it is that there was purple smoke formed during performance in the Tang dynasty. The "songs of Qiupu" expresses the emotions of Li Bai with the image.

== Festivals ==
=== The Lantern Festival ===
Words of "Lantern festival" in Chinese characters

The Lantern Festival (Chinese: 元宵节) is a time for everyone to be with their families. The three-day show, Da Shuhua performs around the Lunar New Year to celebrate the Lantern Festival in Nuanquan. The Lantern Festival is an ancient festival and usually celebrated on the fifteenth day of the first lunar month. Although it occurs two weeks after the Spring Festival, it is a popular time of the year as it marks the end of the traditional Chinese New Year celebration. During the Lantern Festival, local residents gather at the Tree Flower square, in the center of Nuanquan town, for Da Shuhua. On the Lantern Festival, the celebrations of Nuanquan Town start in the morning of the day and continue late into the midnight. Da Shuhua is a way of expressing good wishes that local people prayed for happiness, health and prosperity in the new year. In other places of China, people hung red lanterns outside their windows, eat yuanxiao (Chinese: 元宵) and shoot off firecrackers to celebrate the Lantern Festival.

=== The Dragon Boat Festival ===
Da Shuhua marks the start of the Dragon Boat Festival (Chinese: 端午节). The Dragon Boat Festival occurs on the fifth day of May of the lunar year, which is a public holiday in China. The performers of Da Shuhua will start working on the Dragon Boat Festival and every weekend of the second half of the year until the end of the Lantern Festival which marks the end of the Spring Festival. Eating zongzi (sticky rice dumpling) and racing dragon boats are also the traditional activities that people used to celebrate the festival.

== Artists ==
=== Wang De ===
Wang De, who is the lead performer of Da Shuhua in China. Wang was born in Nuanquan, in nineteen sixty-four. As one of the inheritors of Da Shuhua, Wang learned it from his father when he was young. Wang earns 300 yuan for each show and works on the weekend during the second half of the year and the Spring Festival. The Lantern Festival is the busiest time of the year for Wang. For the rest of the time, Wang grows corn. Wang has two sons and he passes his skills to his younger son, who was born in nineteen ninety-seven.

=== Sui Jianguo ===
Sui is a 14th-generation blacksmith in Nuanquan. He has been performing the art for 25 years.

=== Yu Zhangliang ===
Yu is the artist from Nuanquan who took part in the "Story of Yanxi Palace" and performed Da Shuhua in the series.

== See also ==
- Chinese paper cutting
- Story of Yanxi Palace
- Yuxian County
