= Chenjiawa Township =

Chenjiawa Township 陈家洼乡
- Rural Township
- Chénjiāwā Xiāng
- Location in Hebei Location in China
- Coordinates: 40°03′52″N 114°40′38″E
- Country: People's Republic of China
- Province: Hebei
- Prefecture-level city: Zhangjiakou
- County: Yu

Area
  - Total: 94.29 km^{2} (36.41 sq mi)

Population (2010)
  - Total: 5,832
  - Density: 61.85/km^{2} (160.2/sq mi)
- Time zone: UTC+8 (China Standard)

Chenjiawa Township (Chinese: 陈家洼乡; pinyin: Chénjiāwā Xiāng) is a rural township located in Yu County, Zhangjiakou, Hebei, China. According to the 2010 census, Chenjiawa Township had a population of 5,832, including 3,008 males and 2,824 females. The population was distributed as follows: 1,132 people aged under 14, 3,826 people aged between 15 and 64, and 874 people aged over 65.

== See also ==
- List of township-level divisions of Hebei
