= King Wuling of Zhao =

King Wuling of Zhao 趙武靈王
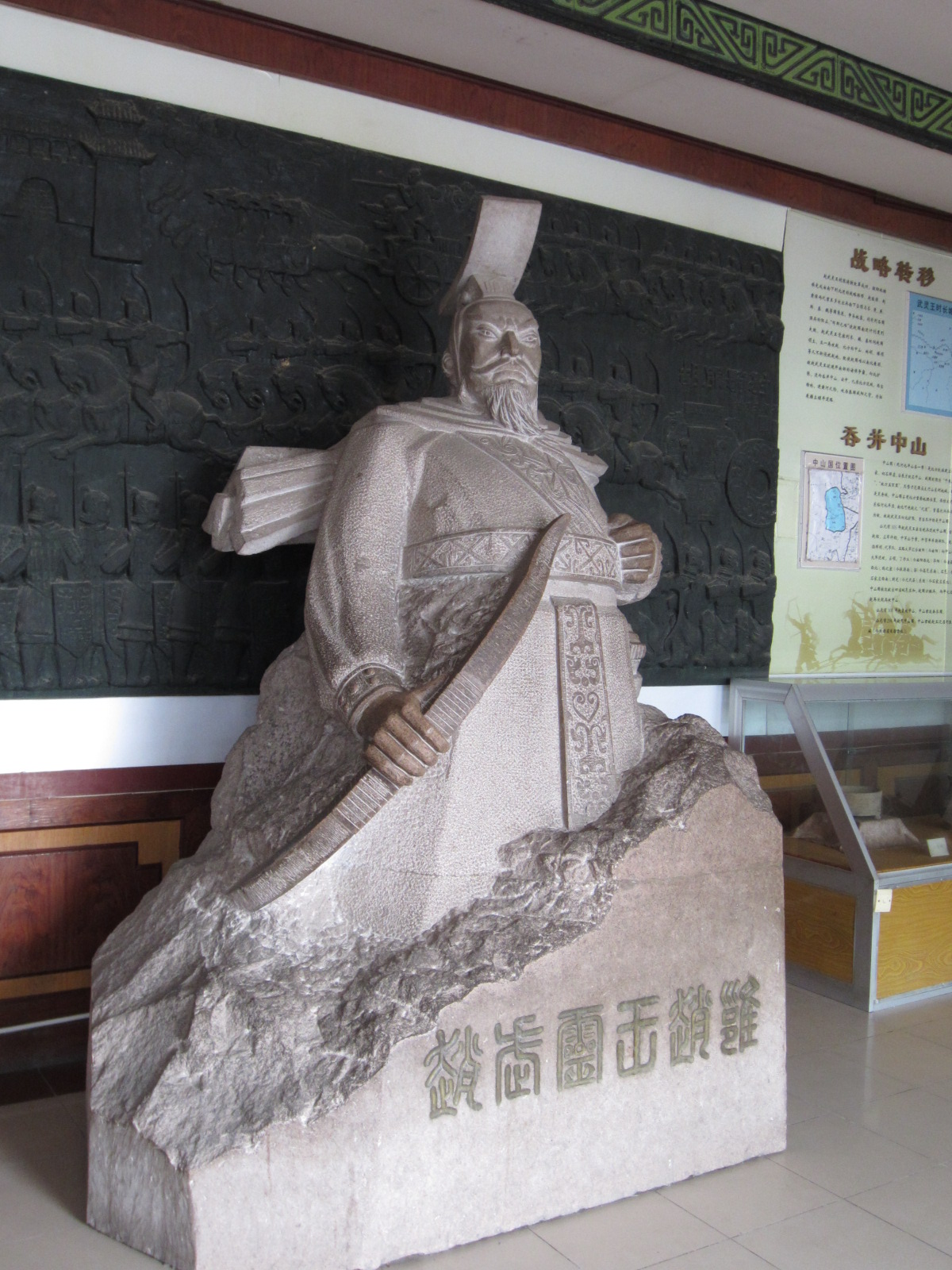
- Statue of King Zhao Wuling in Congtai Park

Lord of Zhao
- Reign: 318–299 BCE
- Predecessor: Marquess Su
- Successor: King Huiwen

King of Zhao
- Reign: 323–318 BCE
- Predecessor: New title
- Successor: vacant (next: King Huiwen)

Marquess of Zhao
- Reign: 325–323 BCE
- Predecessor: Marquess Su
- Successor: Crown as the king
- Born: Unknown
- Died: 295 BCE
- Spouse: Consort Han; Queen Hui
- Issue: Zhao Zhang, Lord Anyang; King Huiwen of Zhao; Zhao Sheng, Lord Pingyuan; Zhao Pao, Lord Pingyang
Names
- Ancestral name: Yíng (嬴); Lineage name: Zhào (趙); Given name: Yōng (雍)
Posthumous name
- King Wuling (武靈王)
- House: Ying
- Dynasty: Zhao
- Father: Marquess Su of Zhao

King Wuling of Zhao (simplified Chinese: 赵武灵王; traditional Chinese: 趙武靈王) (died 295 BCE, r. 325–299 BCE), personal name Zhao Yong, was a ruler of the Zhao state. His reign was famous for one important event: the reforms consisting of "Wearing the Hu (styled) Attire and Shooting from Horseback (in battle)" (胡服騎射). He was credited for the implementation of protective outfit during military events and proceedings.

The son of Marquess Su, King Wuling ascended to the throne at 325 BCE, about halfway into the Warring States period of Chinese history. His reign coincided with the appearance of several other notable figures during the period. He was also the first ruler of Zhao to style himself "king" (王), but later reversed the decision. He would later receive the title as part of his posthumous name.

== Rule and reforms ==
During the early years of his reign, the Kingdom of Zhao was constantly harassed by the Donghu, the Linhu (Simplified and Traditional Chinese: 林胡), the Loufan (Simplified Chinese: 楼烦) and the Beidi, all nomadic animal husbandry tribes. This might have been the inspiration for his later reforms. On another level, Wuling himself had been humbled after a great defeat by Qin. Previously, during 325-323 BC, he, along with the rulers of Han, Wei, Yan and Zhongshan, had declared himself king. However, in 318 BC, Zhao suffered a great defeat in the hands of Qin, causing Wuling to muse that since he did not have the power of a king, he should not use the title.

In 307 BCE, Wuling started his reforms. Mostly military, they concentrated on making the military more suited to fighting battles. Up to that time, Zhao commanders riding on horseback still wore robes and normal court attire. Wuling ordered all commanders, including the whole court and military, to adopt the "Barbarian" Hu (胡) style of dress: pants, belt, boots, fur caps and fur clothes. Influenced by the nomads, he created a cavalry division in the army and trained them not only in the ways of a cavalry charge, but also in horse archery.

While many reformists and officials supported the reforms, seeing it as a way to greatness and power, conservative members of the royal family such as Zhao Wuling's uncle Lord Cheng (Chinese: 公子成) disliked it, claiming that there should not be any "Copying of barbaric clothing and changing of old rules" (Chinese: "襲遠方之服, 變古之教"). Lord Cheng even went so far as to be absent from court.

Wuling did much to check the opposition. He said, "There is not only one way to rule the world, nor is there any need to copy the old to benefit the country" (Chinese: "理世不必一道, 便國不必法古") and "Those who use the old to define the new do not achieve change" (Chinese: "以古制今者, 不達于事之變"). He wore the "barbaric" clothes on court and persuaded others to do the same. He even visited Lord Cheng and gave him a suit of the Hu people's clothing. Finally, Lord Cheng relented, and the controversy stopped.

Wuling's reforms greatly improved the fighting capability of the Zhao military. The same year, the Zhao attacked the state of Zhongshan and took several cities. In 306 BCE the Zhao military launched expeditions into the northern territories. The northern expedition was highly successful: the kings of the Loufan and Linhu surrendered and their territories became administered by a governor of Dai. In the next year, parts of Zhongshan were annexed. In 304 BCE the upper reaches of the Yellow River were invaded and taken from the Hu tribes like the Hezong (Chinese: 河宗氏) and the Xiu (Chinese: 休). In the conquered areas King Wuling created two prefectures in 302 BCE - Yunzhong (Chinese: 雲中) and Jiuyuan (Chinese: 九原). In a little over five years Zhao Wuling had expanded his country to the border with the Yan, the upper reaches of the Yellow River and into the north, and had forced the Loufan (婁煩) and Linhu (林胡) kings to submit to Zhao. King Wuling took control of their armies and added them to his military, creating extra divisions made up entirely of indigenous and hardy nomadic warriors.

== Abdication and death ==
In 299 BCE, Zhao Wuling abdicated and gave the throne of Zhao to his younger son, then 12 year-old Zhao He (趙何) to become King Huiwen of Zhao (趙惠文王). He remained the de-facto ruler and called himself the "Lord Father" (Zhufu, 主父), a title similar to the Taishang Huang of later Chinese dynasties. Under his new title, he visited neighbouring countries, meeting with the king of Loufan and secretly visited Qin, disguised as a Zhao envoy. In 296 BC, he annexed the state of Zhongshan.

In 295 BCE, while King Wuling was touring Shaqiu (沙丘) in present-day Guangzong county, Wuling's older son Zhao Zhang (趙章) rebelled against King Huiwen in Handan but got defeated by forces led by Prime Minister Lord Cheng and his subordinate Lord Fengyang, also known as Li Yu (李兌). Zhao Zhang escaped to the Zhufu's palace in Shaqiu, where Zhao Wuling took pity on him and kept him in his palace.

Lord Cheng and Li Yu forces arrived to Shaqiu and killed Zhao Zhang. Afraid that he would be punished for laying siege to Shaqiu, Li Yu ordered the palace to be deserted and locked King Wuling inside the compound, allowing no food or water to be provided. After 100 days, King Wuling starved to death. This became known as the Shaqiu Incident.
