= Pang Juan =

Chinese general (d. 342 BCE)

- 龐涓
- Died: 342 BC
- Military career
- Allegiance: Wei state
- Conflicts: Battle of Maling

Pang Juan
- Traditional Chinese: 龐涓
- Simplified Chinese: 庞涓
Transcriptions
Standard Mandarin
- Hanyu Pinyin: Páng Juān
- Wade–Giles: Pʻang Chüan

Pang Juan (died 342 BC) was an ancient Chinese military general of the Wei state during the Warring States period.

== Life ==
=== Early life ===
Pang Juan was a fellow student of Sun Bin and both of them studied military strategy together under the tutelage of the hermit Guiguzi. They developed a close friendship and became sworn brothers, while studying in seclusion with their teacher in mountainous regions. Pang left and ventured to the Wei state when he heard that King Hui of Wei was recruiting men of talent to serve him. Pang impressed the king with his proposals on policies to strengthen the Wei state and boldly asserted that he had the ability to help Wei conquer the other six major rival states. The king appointed Pang Juan as a military general and put him in charge of Wei's military forces. Pang led the Wei armies to victories in battles against smaller states such as Song, Lu and Zheng and became a highly respected figure in Wei.

=== Rivalry with Sun Bin ===
Pang invited Sun Bin to join him in serving the Wei state later but he was actually secretly jealous of Sun because Sun learnt more from their teacher than him. Pang Juan framed Sun Bin on charges of treason later and reported Sun to King Hui. The king believed Pang and was furious, that he ordered Sun Bin to be executed. Pang pretended to plead for mercy on Sun's behalf and the king agreed to spare Sun's life. Sun was condemned to face-tattooing (criminal branding) and had his kneecaps removed, becoming a cripple. Pang pretended to take pity on Sun and tried to trick him to compile his knowledge about military strategy into a book and kill him later. But some servants told Sun Bin the truth and Sun Bin discovered Pang's true intentions and feigned madness. Sun escaped from Wei with the help of officials from the Qi state and became an important strategist and statesman in Qi later.

=== Defeat and death ===
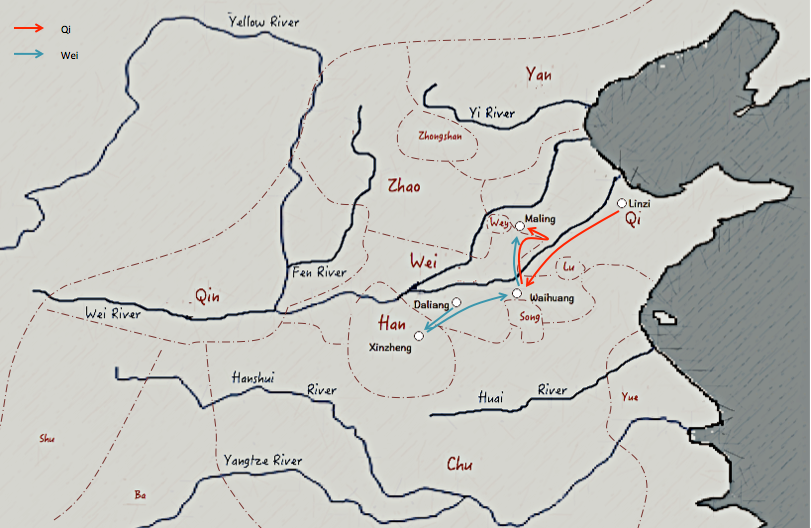
Map showing the situation during Battle of Maling

A struggle between Pang Juan and Sun Bin began, as each of them led his respective state's armies to attack the other. Pang Juan led the Wei army to attack the Zhao state and Zhao requested help from the Qi state. Sun Bin led the Qi army together with Tian Ji and proposed the strategy of "besieging Wei to rescue Zhao", luring Pang Juan to turn back to save Wei from the Qi army, hence lifting the siege on Zhao. At the Battle of Guiling, Pang Juan's forces were defeated in an ambush by Sun Bin's army.

Pang led the Wei army to attack the Han state later and Sun Bin led the Qi forces to invade Wei to save Han. Sun used a strategy to lure Pang Juan's army to follow the Qi army by feigning defeat. Pang fell for the ruse and trailed Sun, where he noticed that the Qi army was apparently shrinking in size. Pang was eager to defeat Sun Bin and he led a light cavalry unit in pursuit, but fell into an ambush by the Qi army in a narrow valley at the Battle of Maling. The Wei army suffered a crushing defeat and the Wei crown prince was captured by Qi forces, while Pang Juan committed suicide. In traditional folklore, Sun Bin carved the words "Pang Juan dies under this tree" on a tree at the ambush area. When Pang and his men arrived, he saw that there were carvings on the tree so he lit a torch for a closer look. At that moment, the Qi troops lying in ambush attacked and Pang Juan committed suicide under that very tree.

== Legacy ==
Pang Juan sometimes appears as a door god in Chinese and Taoist temples, usually paired with Sun Bin.
