= Jia of Zhao =

Zhao Jia 趙嘉

King of Dai
- Reign: 227–223 BCE
- Predecessor: King Youmiao (as king of Zhao)
- Successor: None (Dai annexed by Qin)
- Born: c. 250 BCE
- Died: Unknown
- Spouse: Unknown
Names
- Ancestral name: Yíng (嬴); Lineage name: Zhào (趙); Given name: Jiā (嘉)
- House: Ying
- Dynasty: Dai
- Father: King Daoxiang of Zhao

Zhao Jia
- Traditional Chinese: 趙嘉
- Simplified Chinese: 赵嘉
Transcriptions
Standard Mandarin
- Hanyu Pinyin: Zhào Jiā
- Wade–Giles: Chao Chia

Jia, King of Dai
- Chinese: 代王嘉
- Literal meaning: Jia, King of Dai; Jia, Prince of Dai
Transcriptions
Standard Mandarin
- Hanyu Pinyin: Dàiwáng Jiā
- Wade–Giles: Tai-wang Chia

Zhao Jia (Chinese: 趙嘉), also known as Jia, King of Dai (代王嘉) or Jia, King of Zhao (趙王嘉), reigned as the only king of the Dai state from 227 to 223 BC. His realm was a rump state of the Zhao state that covered only a northern fraction of the Zhao territories. In this regard, he is sometimes considered the last ruler of Zhao.

== Name ==
The title 王 was held by the paramount leaders of Shang and Zhou-era China and is usually translated into English as "king". Under the Han and later Chinese dynasties, however, it was also used for appanages of the imperial families who had no independent sovereignty of their own. In such contexts, it is more common to translate the title as "prince". Sima Qian lists Jia as a lesser lord in his treatment of the state of Zhao, but still describes him as an independent king rather than reducing his rank.

== Life ==
The ruins of ancient Dai in Yu County, Hebei.

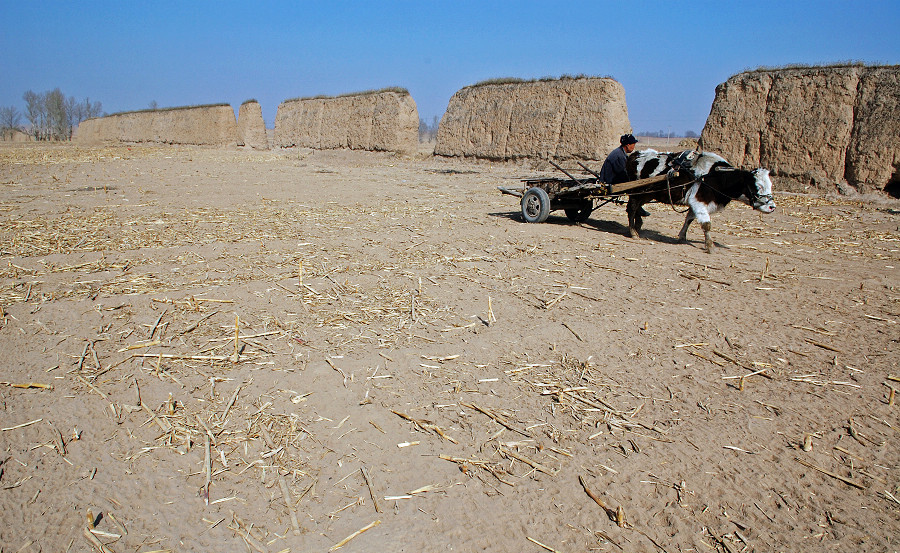
The ruins of ancient Dai in Yu County, Hebei.

Zhao Jia was the eldest son of King Daoxiang of Zhao, but was passed over in succession in favor of his younger brother (who became known as King Youmiao) because of the machinations of the boy's mother, the concubine Zhao Mianchang.

Qin forces captured the Zhao capital of Handan in 228 BCE and captured King Youmiao. It is likely that Zhao Jia was not in Handan at the time, for shortly afterwards he led several hundred clan members towards Dai Commandery, whose seat was southwest of present-day Yuxian in Hebei. This controlled the northeastern quarter of the Zhao kingdom. There, having been proclaimed King by his courtiers, King Jia allied himself with King Xi of Yan against Qin forces, which were poised to invade Yan after Jing Ke's failed assassination attempt on King Zheng of Qin.

At the Battle of Yi River in 226 BCE, the combined forces of Yan and Jia's Kingdom of Dai were defeated by Qin forces, with King Xi of Yan fleeing to Liaodong. Seeing this, King Jia urged King Xi to kill Jing Ke's patron, Prince Dan of Yan, in an attempt to appease the King of Qin. This, combined with the commencement of Qin wars against Wei and Chu, delayed the conquest of Dai for some years.

Ultimately, in 223 BCE, Qin forces under Wang Ben conquered the rump Yan state in Liaodong. On their way back to Central China, they conquered Dai as well. King Jia was taken prisoner, thus extinguishing the last remnant of the Zhao state.

It is unlikely that King Jia was treated too harshly, as his son was sent by the Qin court as an emissary to the Xirong. The descendants of Zhao settled in Tianshui in modern-day Gansu.

== Legacy ==
The site of the ancient city of Dai is now preserved in Yu County, Hebei, under the name "Dai King City" (代王城) in Zhao Jia's honor. He was also seen in Manga Kingdom.

== See also ==
- King of Dai
- Kingdom of Dai during the Warring States
- Other Dai states in Chinese history
