= Baicaocun Township =

Baicaocun Township 白草村乡
- Rural Township
- Báicǎocūn Xiāng
- Location in Hebei Location in China
- Coordinates: 39°55′17″N 114°26′04″E
- Country: People's Republic of China
- Province: Hebei
- Prefecture-level city: Zhangjiakou
- County: Yu

Area
  - Total: 124.6 km^{2} (48.1 sq mi)

Population (2010)
  - Total: 11,913
  - Density: 95.64/km^{2} (247.7/sq mi)
- Time zone: UTC+8 (China Standard)

Baicaocun Township (Chinese: 白草村乡; pinyin: Báicǎocūn Xiāng) is a rural township located in Yu County, Zhangjiakou, Hebei, China. According to the 2010 census, Baicaocun Township had a population of 11,913, including 7,563 males and 4,350 females. The population was distributed as follows: 1,764 people aged under 14, 9,418 people aged between 15 and 64, and 731 people aged over 65.

== See also ==
- List of township-level divisions of Hebei
