= Beishuiquan =

Beishuiquan 北水泉镇
- Town
- Běishuǐquán Zhèn
- Location in Hebei Location in China
- Coordinates: 40°07′49″N 114°41′27″E
- Country: People's Republic of China
- Province: Hebei
- Prefecture-level city: Zhangjiakou
- County-level city: Yu

Area
  - Total: 98.24 km^{2} (37.93 sq mi)

Population (2010)
  - Total: 11,067
  - Density: 112.7/km^{2} (292/sq mi)
- Time zone: UTC+8 (China Standard)

Beishuiquan (Chinese: 北水泉镇; pinyin: Běishuǐquán Zhèn) is a town located in Yu County, Zhangjiakou, Hebei, China. According to the 2010 census, Beishuiquan had a population of 11,067, including 5,775 males and 5,292 females. The population was distributed as follows: 2,081 people aged under 14, 7,468 people aged between 15 and 64, and 1,518 people aged over 65.

== See also ==
- List of township-level divisions of Hebei
