= King Daoxiang of Zhao =

King Daoxiang of Zhao 趙悼襄王

King of Zhao
- Reign: 244 BC-236 BC
- Predecessor: King Xiaocheng
- Successor: King Youmiu
- Born: unknown
- Died: 236 BC
- Spouse: unknown
- Issue: Jia of Zhao; King Youmiu
Names
- Ancestral name: Yíng (嬴); Lineage name: Zhào (趙); Given name: Yǎn (偃)
Posthumous name
- King Daoxiang (悼襄王)
- House: Ying
- Dynasty: Zhao
- Father: King Xiaocheng of Zhao

King Daoxiang of Zhao (Chinese: 趙悼襄王) (died 236 BC; r. 244–236 BC), personal name Zhao Yan, was a monarch of the Zhao state.

Born to King Xiaocheng, King Daoxiang was originally not groomed to succeed to the throne. However, his path to the throne was eased by the circumstances. Firstly, the heir to the Zhao throne was required to spend a large portion of his youth as a hostage in the Qin court – thus making him susceptible to court intrigue. Secondly, the minister Guo Kai was intent on making King Daoxiang the next king. Therefore, when King Xiaocheng died, instead of welcoming the rightful heir back to Handan, Guo Kai proclaimed King Daoxiang as king instead. The famous Zhao general Lian Po objected to this state of affairs and resigned his posts as a result.

King Daoxiang's rule saw the Zhao state engage in warfare with its eastern neighbour, Yan. Under the command of general Li Mu, Zhao initiated a successful campaign against Yan in 243 BC, under Pang Nuan in 242 BC, and an unknown general in 236 BC land in what is now central Hebei.

King Daoxiang died in 236 BC, in the midst of a Qin invasion of Zhao and was succeeded by King Youmiu.

In King Daoxiang's 1st Year, Zhao made preparations against Wei, attempting to open a route between Pingyi and Zhongmou, but failed. In his 2nd Year, 243 BC, Zhao General Li Mu (李牧) attacked Yan, capturing Wusui (武遂) and Fangcheng (方城). Zhao's Lord Chunping (春平君) was summoned and detained by Qin, so Zhao sent a diplomat to Qin, exchanging Lord Chunping for territory, Zhao also fortified Han'gao (韓皋). In his 3rd Year, 242 BC, Yan general Ju Xin (劇辛) attacked Zhao, he was defeated by Zhao general Pang Nuan (龐煖), Ju Xin was killed and 20,000 soldiers were captured. In his 4th Year, 241 BC, Zhao General Pang Nuan led elite troops of Zhao, Chu, Wei, and Yan to attack Qin at Zui (蕞), failing to capture it, they withdrew, they then attacked Qi, capturing Rao'an (饒安). In his 5th Year, 240 BC, Zhao general Fu Di (傅抵) lead an army stationed at Pingyi (平邑), while general Qing She (慶舍) lead an army outside Donyang (東陽). In his 6th Year, 239 BC, The Younger half-brother of King Zheng of Qin (Later Qin Shi Huang), Cheng Jiao (成蟜), attacked Zhao, he rebelled and died at Tunliu (屯留), Wei gave Zhao the city of Ye (鄴). In his 9th Year, 236 BC, Zhao attacked Yan, capturing Li (貍) and Yangcheng (陽城), before the troops returned, a Qin army led by Wang Jian (王翦), Huan Yi (桓齮), and Yang Duanhe (楊端和) attacked Zhao, capturing Eyu (閼與), Laoyang (橑楊), Anyang (安陽), Ye, and 9 cities, this year King Daoxiang died and is succeeded by his son Zhao Qian, who become King Youmiao.

== Family ==
Daoxiang's oldest son, Jia, was the son of his first wife, whose name is unknown. Jia was initially heir apparent. However the "Songstress Queen", Zhao Mianchang, a consort from Handan, entered the court as a concubine and gave birth to a son, Qian, later King Youmiu of Zhao. Zhao Mianchang allegedly slandered both the queen and Prince Jia, and arranged for someone to offend Jia to provoke him into committing a crime. After Jia had lost favour with Daoxiang, Qian was established as the new heir apparent and Zhao Mianchang was installed as the new queen.

== Popular culture ==
King Daoxiang appears in manga and anime series Kingdom, who appears as a tyrannical king in the series.
