= Marquess Su of Zhao =

Marquess Su of Zhao 趙肅侯

Marquess of Zhao
- Reign: 349 BCE-326 BCE
- Predecessor: Marquess Cheng
- Successor: King Wuling
- Born: Unknown
- Died: 326 BCE
- Burial: Shou Mausoleum (壽陵)
- Spouse: Unknown
Names
- Ancestral name: Yíng (嬴); Lineage name: Zhào (趙); Given name: Yǔ (語)
Posthumous name
- Marquess Su (肅侯)
- House: Ying
- Dynasty: Zhao
- Father: Marquess Cheng of Zhao

Marquess Su of Zhao (Chinese: 趙肅侯) (died 326 BCE, r. 349–326 BCE), personal name Zhao Yu, was a marquess of the Zhao state.

Marquess Su reigned during a time when the authority of the Eastern Zhou kings was fast declining. In 344 BCE, the marquesses of Wei and Qi agreed to recognize each other as kings, thus putting them on parity with the Eastern Zhou royalty. Angered by the exclusion of his state, Marquess Su laid siege to Wei fortresses in the north. This failed; and in anticipation of possible retaliatory attacks, he ordered the construction of walls along the northern and southern borders, as well as along the course of the Zhang River.

Marquess Su died in 326 BCE. The states of Qin, Chu, Yan, Qi, and Wei each sent ten thousand crack troops to Zhao to attend the funeral. His son, Zhao Yong (King Wuling), succeeded him to the Zhao throne.
