= Battle of Guiling =

Chinese Battle

- Part of Warring States period
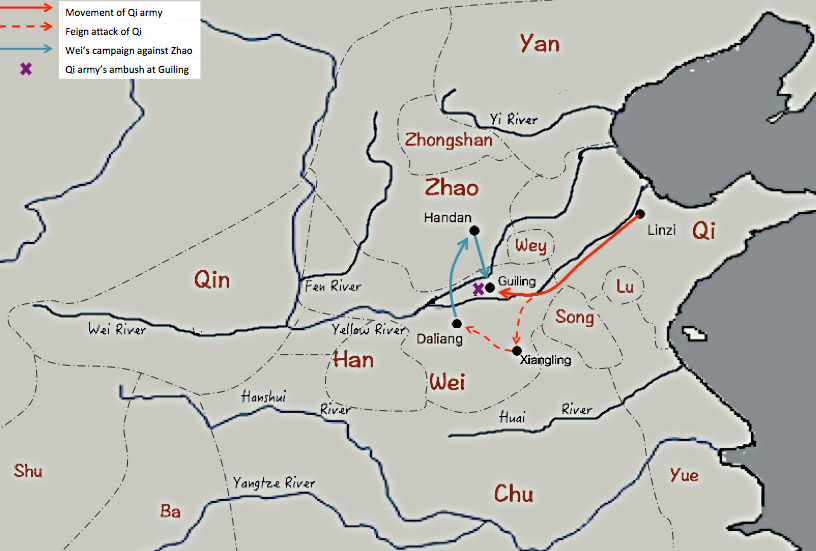
Date	354–353 BC
Location	Handan, Daliang, and Guiling (Modern-day Handan, Kaifeng and Changyuan of Henan)
Result	Qi victory

Belligerents
State of Qi; State of Zhao	State of Wei

Commanders and leaders
Tian Ji and Sun Bin	Pang Juan

Strength
80,000	80,000

Casualties and losses
9,000	21,000

The Battle of Guìlíng (simplified Chinese: 桂陵之战; traditional Chinese: 桂陵之戰) was fought between the states of Qi and Wei in the Warring States period of Chinese history.

In 354 BC, an army from Wei was laying siege to Handan, the capital of the State of Zhao. The next year, Zhao turned to Qi for help. Tian Ji and Sun Bin, acting as co-commanders of Qi, led an army to lift the siege and save Zhao. Sun Bin moved south intentionally to make an unsuccessful attack on Pingling, intending to convince Wei commander Pang Juan that the Qi Army was too weak to achieve victory. Pang Juan, falling for the ruse, pooled more of his forces to besiege Handan. Although defeated, the Zhao Army fought desperately and suffered heavy losses to the Wei Army in the subsequent battle. After feigning defeat at Pingling, Sun Bin led his army directly to the Wei capital, Daliang. Wei scouts reported that the Qi Army had committed small groups to attack the city. Upon hearing the report, Wei general Pang Juan took his crack cavalry and left his infantry and supplies at Handan, making a mad dash in an attempt to rescue Daliang. Pang Juan's troops were exhausted as they crossed the Yellow River and were ambushed and destroyed at Guiling by Sun's numerically superior army. Pang Juan managed to escape alone to Wei.

This battle gives rise to a well-known proverb and phrase, "Besiege Wei to rescue Zhao" (圍魏救趙), which is also included as one of the Thirty-Six Strategies compiled by Wáng Jìngzé.
