= Yu County, Hebei =

Yu County 蔚县
- County
- Xijinhekou Village

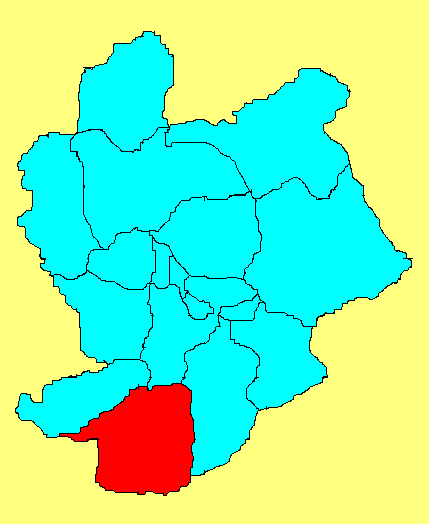
- Location in Zhangjiakou City jurisdiction

- Location of the county seat in Hebei
- Coordinates: 39°50′N 114°34′E
- Country: People's Republic of China
- Province: Hebei
- Prefecture-level city: Zhangjiakou
- Seat: Yuzhou (蔚州镇)

Area
  - Total: 3,183 km^{2} (1,229 sq mi)

Population (2020 census)
  - Total: 411,824
  - Density: 129.4/km^{2} (335.1/sq mi)
- Time zone: UTC+8 (China Standard)
- Postal code: 075700
- Area code: 0313
- Website: www.zjkyx.gov.cn (in Chinese)

Yu County, Hebei
- Traditional Chinese: 蔚縣
- Simplified Chinese: 蔚县
Transcriptions
Standard Mandarin
- Hanyu Pinyin: Yùxiàn
- Wade–Giles: Yü Hsien

Former names
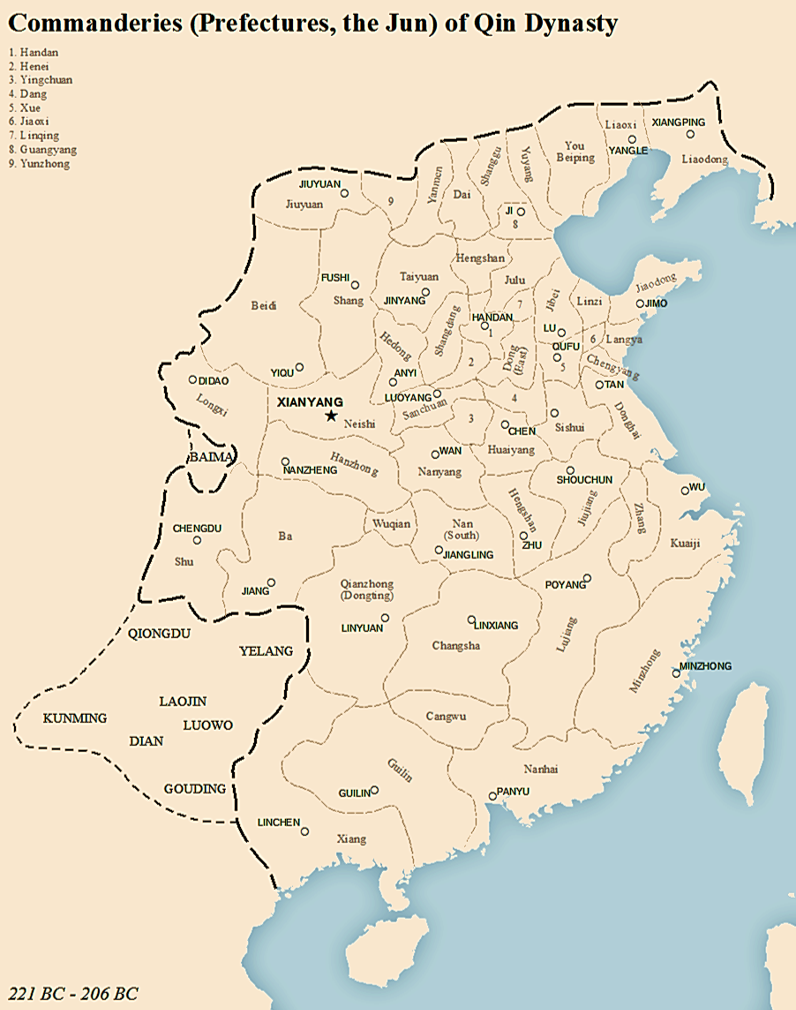
- A map of the commanderies of the Qin Empire, with Dai in the central north

Dai Commandery
- Chinese: 代郡
Transcriptions
Standard Mandarin
- Hanyu Pinyin: Dàijùn
- Wade–Giles: Tai Chün; Tai-chün

Dai County
- Traditional Chinese: 代縣
- Simplified Chinese: 代县
Transcriptions
Standard Mandarin
- Hanyu Pinyin: Dàixiàn
- Wade–Giles: Tai Hsien; Tai-hsien

Yu County, also known by its Chinese name Yuxian, is a county under the jurisdiction of the prefecture-level city of Zhangjiakou in northwestern Hebei province, China. Yuzhou town (蔚州镇) is the county seat.

== History ==
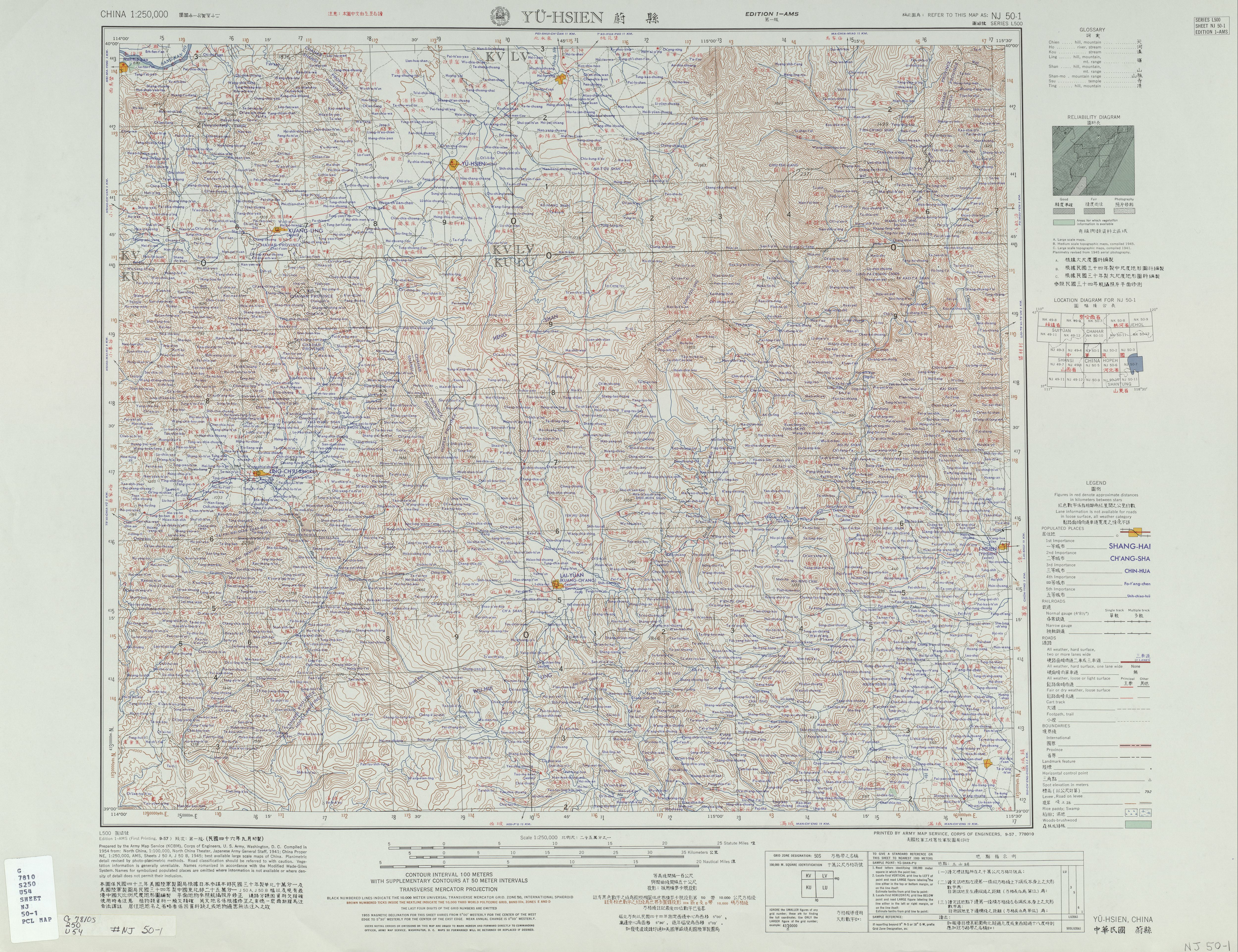
Map including Yu County (labeled as YÜ-HSIEN (walled) 蔚縣) (AMS, 1954)

The area was home to the capital of the state of Dai during the Spring and Autumn period of the Zhou dynasty. Under the Qin dynasty, present-day Yu County was organized as Dai County, with its seat Daixian located northeast of present-day Yuzhou. Daixian also served as the capital of Dai Commandery, overseeing 11 or 13 counties in what is now northwestern Hebei and northeastern Shanxi. Under the Eastern Han, the commandery seat was moved west to Gaoliu (near present-day Yanggao County in Shanxi). It returned to Daixian near present-day Yuzhou under the kingdom of Wei during the Three Kingdoms period before the commandery was abolished in 388. (A separate Dai Commandery was established by the Northern Wei in the 520s, with its seat at Pingcheng, just northeast of present-day Datong in Shanxi.)

The city was a former garrison town during the Ming dynasty, serving as part of the defense system protecting the capital Beijing from Mongol Northern Yuan invasion.

== Administrative divisions ==
Towns:

- Yuzhou (蔚州镇), Daiwangcheng (代王城镇), Xiheying (西合营镇), Jijiazhuang (吉家庄镇), Baile (白乐镇), Nuanquan (暖泉镇), Nanliuzhuang (南留庄镇), Beishuiquan (北水泉镇), Taohua (桃花镇), Yangjuan (阳眷镇), Songjiazhuang (宋家庄镇)

Townships:

- Xiagongcun Township (下宫村乡), Nanyangzhuang Township (南杨庄乡), Baishu Township (柏树乡), Changning Township (常宁乡), Yongquanzhuang Township (涌泉庄乡), Yangzhuangke Township (杨庄窠乡), Nanlingzhuang Township (南岭庄乡), Chenjiawa Township (陈家洼乡), Huangmei Township (黄梅乡), Baicaocun Township (白草村乡), Caogoubu Township (草沟堡乡)

== Climate ==
Climate data for Yuxian, elevation 910 m (2,990 ft), (1991–2020 normals, extremes 1981–2010)
Month	Jan	Feb	Mar	Apr	May	Jun	Jul	Aug	Sep	Oct	Nov	Dec	Year
Record high °C (°F)	9.3 (48.7)	20.2 (68.4)	26.8 (80.2)	35.8 (96.4)	36.9 (98.4)	39.3 (102.7)	39.6 (103.3)	36.0 (96.8)	35.6 (96.1)	29.2 (84.6)	23.2 (73.8)	14.7 (58.5)	39.6 (103.3)
Mean daily maximum °C (°F)	−2.4 (27.7)	2.9 (37.2)	10.2 (50.4)	18.2 (64.8)	24.4 (75.9)	28.3 (82.9)	29.5 (85.1)	27.9 (82.2)	23.3 (73.9)	16.3 (61.3)	7.0 (44.6)	−0.7 (30.7)	15.4 (59.7)
Daily mean °C (°F)	−9.9 (14.2)	−4.8 (23.4)	2.7 (36.9)	10.7 (51.3)	17.4 (63.3)	21.6 (70.9)	23.4 (74.1)	21.6 (70.9)	16.2 (61.2)	8.9 (48.0)	−0.2 (31.6)	−7.6 (18.3)	8.3 (47.0)
Mean daily minimum °C (°F)	−15.7 (3.7)	−11.0 (12.2)	−3.8 (25.2)	3.6 (38.5)	10.3 (50.5)	15.5 (59.9)	18.2 (64.8)	16.4 (61.5)	10.3 (50.5)	2.9 (37.2)	−5.6 (21.9)	−12.8 (9.0)	2.4 (36.2)
Record low °C (°F)	−29.5 (−21.1)	−28.3 (−18.9)	−24.7 (−12.5)	−11.1 (12.0)	−4.2 (24.4)	3.7 (38.7)	7.8 (46.0)	5.0 (41.0)	−2.2 (28.0)	−11.3 (11.7)	−27.2 (−17.0)	−30.1 (−22.2)	−30.1 (−22.2)
Average precipitation mm (inches)	1.8 (0.07)	4.1 (0.16)	8.3 (0.33)	21.4 (0.84)	36.6 (1.44)	56.6 (2.23)	105.6 (4.16)	75.8 (2.98)	53.4 (2.10)	25.7 (1.01)	9.7 (0.38)	1.9 (0.07)	400.9 (15.77)
Average precipitation days (≥ 0.1 mm)	2.4	2.8	3.6	5.5	7.6	12.1	13.3	11.3	9.0	6.4	3.3	1.9	79.2
Average snowy days	4.0	4.7	3.8	1.7	0	0	0	0	0	0.6	3.8	4.1	22.7
Average relative humidity (%)	54	46	41	40	42	52	65	67	64	58	57	54	53
Mean monthly sunshine hours	200.7	204.7	247.5	261.4	286.3	261.5	259.0	258.0	235.7	228.9	200.6	190.6	2,834.9
Percentage possible sunshine	67	67	66	65	64	59	58	62	64	67	68	66	64
Source: China Meteorological Administration

== Landmarks ==
Though seldom visited by tourists, the Old City (the earthen rampart walls of which remain in some spots) is home to numerous temples, including the well-preserved Caishen Temple in honor of the Chinese money god. The restored city tower stands at the center of the old city.

== Transportation ==
The county is accessible via bus from Beijing's Liuliqiao Bus Station.

== See also ==
- Dashuhua
