= Xianyu =

Xianyu may refer to:

- Xianyu people, a Beidi tribe in northern China during the Zhou dynasty
  - Xianyu (state), a minor state in northern China during the Zhou dynasty
  - Zhongshan (state), usually considered a continuation of the earlier Xianyu Kingdom
- Xianyukou (鲜鱼口), a street name of Hutong located at downtown of Beijing, meaning crossing of Xianyu
- Xianyu, Dingxing County (贤寓镇), a town in Dingxing County, Hebei, China
- Xianyu, Zhuzhou (仙庾镇), a town in Hetang District, Zhuzhou, Hunan, China
- Xianyu, Shitai County (仙寓镇), a town in Shitai County, Anhui, China
- Xianyu (surname) (鮮于), a Chinese compound surname listed in the Hundred Family Surnames
- Xianyu (闲鱼, Goofish), a classified ads and online shopping app in China for buying and selling used goods, part of Alibaba Group
