= Pingshan County, Hebei =

Place in Hebei, China

Pingshan County 平山县
- County
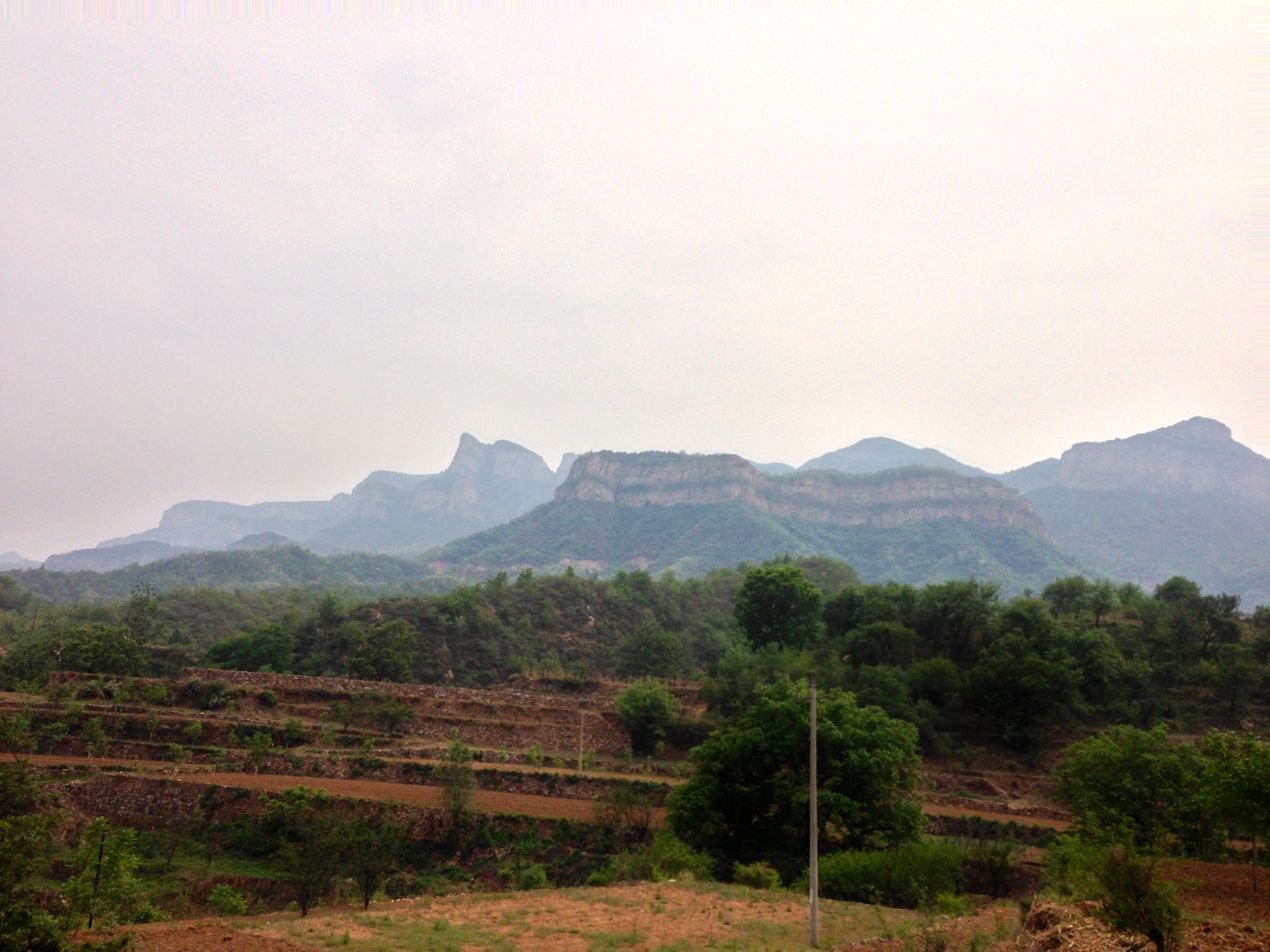
- Taihang Mountains in Pingshan

- Location in Hebei
- Coordinates: 38°14′49″N 114°11′56″E
- Country: People's Republic of China
- Province: Hebei
- Prefecture-level city: Shijiazhuang

Area
  - Total: 2,641 km^{2} (1,020 sq mi)

Population (2020 census)
  - Total: 423,333
  - Density: 160.3/km^{2} (415.2/sq mi)
- Time zone: UTC+8 (China Standard)

Pingshan County (simplified Chinese: 平山县; traditional Chinese: 平山縣; pinyin: Píngshān Xiàn; lit. 'Flat Mountain') is a county of Hebei Province, North China, bordering Shanxi province to the west. It is under the administration of the prefecture-level city of Shijiazhuang, the provincial capital. Its most-well known settlement is Xibaipo, where the Central Committee of the Chinese Communist Party and the headquarters of the People's Liberation Army were located during the decisive stages of the Chinese Civil War between 26 May 1948 and 23 March 1949.

== History ==
Yangshao culture relics were found in eight villages in the county along the Hutuo River. The area belonged to the Xianyu Kingdom during the Spring and Autumn period, later going to the Zhongshan and Zhao states during the Warring States period before forming part of the Hengshan Commandery in the Qin dynasty.

Under the Western Han, Pingshan County was established as Puwu County, named after the county seat village, a portion of which was split off into Fangshan County in 596 during the Sui dynasty. The remaining land merged into nearby Jingxing County in 627 under the Tang dynasty and in 756, Fangshan County was renamed to Pingshan County.

During the Second Sino-Japanese War, Pingshan County became a stronghold for the Chinese Communist Party. The Pingshan County Anti-Japanese Democratic Government (平山县抗日民主政府) was located in Hongzidian, a village of Guyue (now Zhongguyue town). Throughout the 1940s, Pingshan and surrounding counties were repeatedly reorganised and by the end of World War II in 1945, the western half of Pingshan County was split off into Jianping County.

Following the establishment of the People's Republic of China in 1949, the counties of Pingshan and Jianping came under jurisdiction of Shijiazhuang. In September 1958, Jianping County was dissolved and became part of Pingshan County again.

== Administrative divisions ==
Towns:

- Pingshan (平山镇), Donghuishe (东回舍镇), Wentang (温塘镇), Nandian (南甸镇), Gangnan (岗南镇), Zhongguyue (中古月镇), Xiahuai (下槐镇), Mengjiazhuang (孟家庄镇), Xiaojue (小觉镇), Jiaotanzhuang (蛟潭庄镇), Xibaipo (西柏坡镇), Xiakou (下口镇)

Townships:

- Xidawu Township (西大吾乡), Shangsanji Township (上三汲乡), Lianghe Township (两河乡), Dongwangpo Township (东王坡乡), Sujiazhuang Township (苏家庄乡), Zhaibei Township (宅北乡), Beiye Township (北冶乡), Shangguanyintang Township (上观音堂乡), Yangjiaqiao Township (杨家桥乡), Yingli Township (营里乡), Hehekou Township (合河口乡)

== Demographics ==
As of 2022, 422,707 people live in Pingshan County. Of these 222,523 reside in urban centers while 200,184 reside in rural areas.

== Notable people ==
- Wang Ao (王翺): high ranking official of Ming dynasty
- Li Zhanshu (栗戰書): senior politician of People's Republic of China and high-ranking cadre of the Chinese Communist Party

== Climate ==
Climate data for Pingshan, elevation 131 m (430 ft), (1991–2020 normals, extremes 1981–present)
Month	Jan	Feb	Mar	Apr	May	Jun	Jul	Aug	Sep	Oct	Nov	Dec	Year
Record high °C (°F)	18.3 (64.9)	25.1 (77.2)	31.7 (89.1)	35.2 (95.4)	38.8 (101.8)	43.8 (110.8)	42.4 (108.3)	37.5 (99.5)	38.3 (100.9)	33.0 (91.4)	27.1 (80.8)	22.4 (72.3)	43.8 (110.8)
Mean daily maximum °C (°F)	2.4 (36.3)	6.5 (43.7)	14.7 (58.5)	21.5 (70.7)	27.5 (81.5)	31.3 (88.3)	31.7 (89.1)	30.0 (86.0)	26.1 (79.0)	19.8 (67.6)	11.0 (51.8)	4.2 (39.6)	18.9 (66.0)
Daily mean °C (°F)	−2.7 (27.1)	1.0 (33.8)	8.7 (47.7)	15.4 (59.7)	21.6 (70.9)	25.6 (78.1)	26.9 (80.4)	25.4 (77.7)	20.8 (69.4)	14.2 (57.6)	5.8 (42.4)	−0.7 (30.7)	13.5 (56.3)
Mean daily minimum °C (°F)	−6.8 (19.8)	−3.4 (25.9)	3.1 (37.6)	9.5 (49.1)	15.8 (60.4)	20.2 (68.4)	22.8 (73.0)	21.6 (70.9)	16.6 (61.9)	9.8 (49.6)	1.7 (35.1)	−4.5 (23.9)	8.9 (48.0)
Record low °C (°F)	−18.2 (−0.8)	−14.6 (5.7)	−8.2 (17.2)	−0.6 (30.9)	5.8 (42.4)	11.2 (52.2)	16.1 (61.0)	14.3 (57.7)	6.9 (44.4)	−2.4 (27.7)	−10.4 (13.3)	−15.7 (3.7)	−18.2 (−0.8)
Average precipitation mm (inches)	3.6 (0.14)	5.2 (0.20)	9.9 (0.39)	22.8 (0.90)	41.7 (1.64)	65.3 (2.57)	152.9 (6.02)	139.2 (5.48)	60.5 (2.38)	27.9 (1.10)	16.5 (0.65)	3.1 (0.12)	548.6 (21.59)
Average precipitation days (≥ 0.1 mm)	2.0	2.6	3.0	5.9	6.5	9.3	12.5	10.9	7.9	5.6	4.0	2.0	72.2
Average snowy days	2.4	2.7	1.2	0.2	0	0	0	0	0	0	1.5	2.2	10.2
Average relative humidity (%)	58	53	48	52	55	59	73	76	71	65	63	59	61
Mean monthly sunshine hours	152.1	162.3	215.5	237.6	265.3	226.6	186.2	195.9	196.7	188.3	160.2	151.1	2,337.8
Percentage possible sunshine	50	53	58	60	60	51	42	47	53	55	54	51	53
Source: China Meteorological Administrationall-time extreme temperature
