= Xi Da Wu =

Xi Da Wu may refer to following individuals of which name in Chinese character can be transliterated to Hanyu Pinyin:

- 西大吾 (Xīdàwú), a township-level division in Hebei, China
- 西大伍 (Xī Dàwǔ; born 1987), Japanese footballer
