= Xi'an guyue =

Chinese traditional music genre

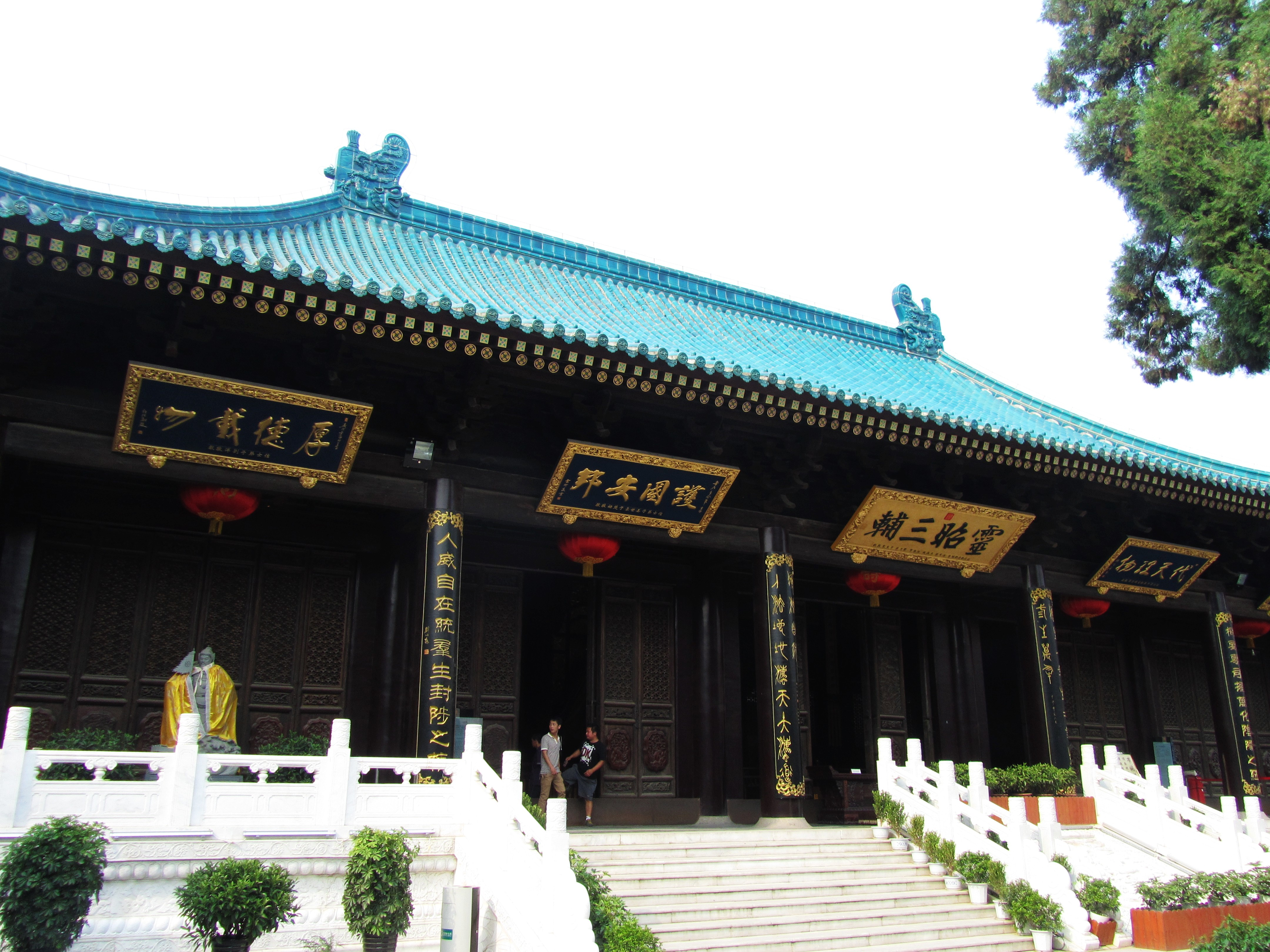
- A pavilion of the Chenghuangmiao of Xi'an.
- Stylistic origins: Ritual music
- Cultural origins: Xi'an (Shaanxi), China
- Typical instruments: Wind and percussion

Xi'an wind and percussion ensemble
- UNESCO Intangible Cultural Heritage
- Country: China
- Reference: 00212
- Region: Asia and the Pacific

Inscription history
- Inscription: 2009 (4th session)
- List: Representative

Xi'an guyue (Chinese: 西安鼓乐), also Shaanxi guyue (陕西鼓乐), is the regional Chinese ritual music genre featuring a type of wind and percussion ensemble named for its place of origin, Xi'an, in Shaanxi Province. It is also, somewhat misleadingly, called Xi'an drum music. A folk genre, sustained by amateur groups before the 1960s, it was placed on the UNESCO Intangible Cultural Heritage List in 2009.

The music is split into two categories based on performance, sitting and walking (the latter including chorus), and into three repertoires based on transmission, Buddhist (Seng), Daoist (Dao), and secular (Su).

Though associated with the Tang dynasty (due to its prestige and history), the genre shares more with the late Ming and Qing dynasties. The ensembles formerly included other instruments, such as the pipa and daqin (presumably the zheng), as witnessed in gongche manuscripts. Famous musicians include An Laixu (安来绪, 1895-1977), Daoist master of Xi'an's Chenghuangmiao temple. Manuscripts collected during the fifties date as far back as 1689, but the knowledge of how to perform pieces that old is lost. The genre flourished in the thirties and forties, with ensembles going from temple to temple, "but tacitly it was also treated like a competition." The number of musical ensembles and temples of all kinds was greatly reduced during the cultural revolution in the sixties and seventies, beginning to return more as historical preservation, academic research, or tourism then as religious practice in the eighties.

== Literature ==
- Yang Yinliu (ed.): Zhongguo yinyue cidian (Dictionary of Chinese Music). Beijing 1984.
- Cheng Yu: Xi'an Guyue - Xi'an Old Music in New China. “Living fossil” or “flowing river” (Dissertation) Department of Music. School of Oriental and African Studies, University of London, 2005.

== See also ==
- Guyue Bridge
- Guyue
