= Wentang =

Wentang may refer to the following locations in China:

- Wentang, Hebei (温塘镇), town in Pingshan County
- Wentang, Xinhua County (温塘镇), town in Hunan
- Wentang, Zhangjiajie (温塘镇), town in Yongding District, Zhangjiajie, Hunan
- Wentang, Jiangxi (温汤镇), town in Yuanzhou District
