= CUO =

CUO may refer to:

- Company Under Officer, a military appointment in some Commonwealth countries.
- CuO - Copper(II) oxide
- COU is the ICAO airline designator for Aerocuahonte, Mexico
- Compaq Users Organisation
- Cadet Under Officer senior cadet rank in some youth cadet forces
- King Cuo of Zhongshan
- Chief Underwriting Officer used in insurance company or top underwriting occupation of an insurance company
