= Zhongshan Wang =

Zhongshan Wang (中山王, King/Prince of Zhongshan) may refer to:

== Warring States period ==
- King Cuo of Zhongshan (323–309 BC), fifth ruler of the state of Zhongshan

== Han dynasty ==
- Liu Sheng, Prince of Zhongshan (died 113 BC)
- Liu Xing, Prince of Zhongshan (died 8 BC)
- Emperor Ping of Han (9 BC – 6 AD), known as Prince of Zhongshan before he became emperor in 1 BC

== Others ==
- Xu Da (1332–1385), Ming dynasty general, posthumously honored as Zhongshan Wang
