= Zhongguyue =

Coordinates: 38°17′N 113°52′E

- Town

Chinese transcription(s)
- Interactive map of Zhongguyue
- Country: China
- Province: Hebei
- Prefecture: Shijiazhuang
- County: Pingshan County
- Time zone: UTC+8 (China Standard Time)

Zhongguyue (Chinese: 中古月镇) is a township-level division of Pingshan County, Shijiazhuang, Hebei, China.

== See also ==
- List of township-level divisions of Hebei
- Guyue Bridge
- Xi'an guyue
