= Lianghe (disambiguation) =

Lianghe may refer to the following locations in China:

- Lianghe County (梁河县), Dehong Prefecture, Yunnan

Townships (两河乡)

- Lianghe Township, Quanzhou County, Guangxi
- Lianghe Township, Pan County, in Pan County, Guizhou
- Lianghe Township, Pingshan County, Hebei
- Lianghe Township, Huayuan County, in Huayuan County, Hunan
- Lianghe Township, Zhashui County, in Zhashui County, Shaanxi
- Lianghe Township, Linshui County, in Linshui County, Sichuan
- Lianghe Township, Yiliang County, Zhaotong, in Yiliang County, Zhaotong, Yunnan
