= Mengjiazhuang =

Coordinates: 38.42525°N 113.88241°E

Mengjiazhuang 孟家庄镇
- Town

Chinese transcription(s)
- Interactive map of Mengjiazhuang
- Country: China
- Province: Hebei
- Prefecture: Shijiazhuang
- County: Pingshan County
- Time zone: UTC+8 (China Standard Time)

Mengjiazhuang (Chinese: 孟家庄镇) is a township-level division of Pingshan County, Shijiazhuang, Hebei, China.

== See also ==
- List of township-level divisions of Hebei
