= Jiaotanzhuang =

Jiaotanzhuang 蛟潭庄镇
- Town
- Location in Hebei
- Coordinates: 38°34′57″N 113°45′00″E
- Country: People's Republic of China
- Province: Hebei
- Prefecture-level city: Shijiazhuang
- County: Pingshan
- Village-level divisions: 32 villages
- Elevation: 528 m (1,732 ft)
- Time zone: UTC+8 (China Standard)
- Area code: 0311

Jiaotanzhuang (simplified Chinese: 蛟潭庄; traditional Chinese: 蛟潭莊; pinyin: Jiāotánzhuāng) is a town in the Taihang Mountains of Pingshan County in western Hebei province, China, located 35 kilometres (22 mi) northwest of the county seat. As of 2011, it has 20 villages under its administration.

== See also ==
- List of township-level divisions of Hebei
