= Beidi =

Ethnic group in ancient Chinese texts; one of the "Four Barbarians" groups

- Zhou geography: Huaxia surrounded by the Four Barbarians—Northern (Beidi), Southern (Nanman), Eastern (Dongyi), and Western (Xirong).
- Chinese: 北狄
- Literal meaning: Northern barbarians
Transcriptions
Standard Mandarin
- Hanyu Pinyin: Běidí
- Wade–Giles: Pei^{3}-ti^{2}

The Di or Beidi (Northern Di) were various ethnic groups who lived north of the Chinese (Huaxia) realms during the Zhou dynasty. Although initially described as nomadic, they seem to have practiced a mixed pastoral, agricultural, and hunting economy and were distinguished from the nomads of the Eurasian steppe who lived to their north. Chinese historical accounts describe the Di inhabiting the upper Ordos Loop and gradually migrating eastward to northern Shanxi and northern Hebei, where they eventually created their own states like Zhongshan and Dai. Other groups of Di seem to have lived interspersed between the Chinese states before their eventual conquest or sinicization.

== Name ==
The ancient Chinese, whose Xia, Shang, and Zhou states flourished along the Fen, Yellow, and Wei valleys, discussed their neighbors according to the cardinal directions. The Four Barbarians were the Di to the north, the Man to the south, the Yi to the east, and the Rong to the west. These came to be used as generic chauvinistic pejoratives for different peoples long after the conquests of the original tribes and so are all usually translated as 'barbarian' in English.

Beidi tribes, ethnic groups, or states were sometimes distinguished as belonging to the "Red Di" (赤狄, Chidi), the "White Di" (白狄, Baidi), or "Tall Di" (長狄, Changdi). The Xianyu (Old Chinese (B-S): *s[a]r[ŋ]ʷ(r)a), Fei, Zhongshan, and Dai kingdoms were founded by White Di. According to Eastern Wu scholar Wei Zhao, Xianyu's founders dwelt among the Di yet shared the same ancestral surname Ji 姬 with the Zhou kings.

William H. Baxter and Laurent Sagart (2014) reconstruct the Old Chinese pronunciation of 狄 as *lˤek; sometimes 狄 was written as 翟, whose pronunciation was reconstructed as *lˤewk. Paul R. Goldin, professor of East Asian Languages and Civilizations at University of Pennsylvania, proposes that 狄/翟 was a pejorative "pseudo-ethnonym" made by Chinese for the northern "barbarians" and it meant "feathered". (Note: 翟 means long-tailed pheasants or their feathers)

== History ==
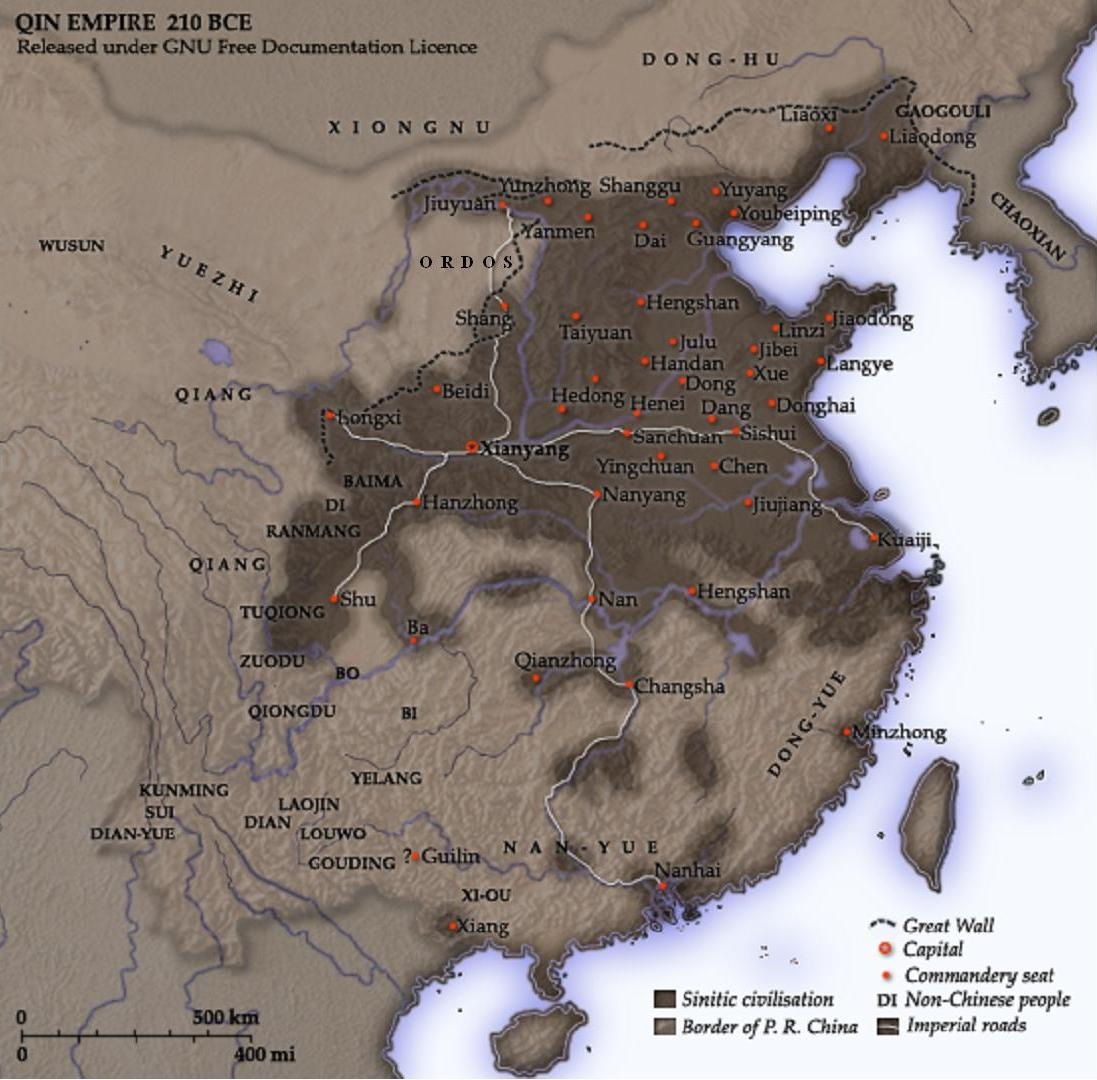
Di lived along the northern edge of what later became the Qin Empire

Surviving accounts of the culture and history of China's early neighbors mostly date from the late Zhou. The Book of Rites notes:

The people of those five regions—the Middle states, and the [Rong], [Yi], (and other wild tribes round them)—had all their several natures, which they could not be made to alter. The tribes on the east were called [Yi]. They had their hair unbound, and tattooed their bodies. Some of them ate their food without its being cooked. Those on the south were called Man. They tattooed their foreheads, and had their feet turned in towards each other. Some of them (also) ate their food without its being cooked. Those on the west were called [Rong]. They had their hair unbound, and wore skins. Some of them did not eat grain-food. Those on the north were called [Di]. They wore skins of animals and birds, and dwelt in caves. Some of them also did not eat grain-food. The people of the Middle states, and of those [Yi], Man, [Rong], and [Di], all had their dwellings, where they lived at ease; their flavours which they preferred; the clothes suitable for them; their proper implements for use; and their vessels which they prepared in abundance. In those five regions, the languages of the people were not mutually intelligible, and their likings and desires were different. To make what was in their minds apprehended, and to communicate their likings and desires, (there were officers)—in the east, called transmitters; in the south, representationists; in the west, [Di-dis]; and in the north, interpreters.

The Di were often associated with the Rong; both were considered more warlike and less civilized than the Yi or Man. According to the Records of the Grand Historian, the ancestors of the Zhou lived in lands near the Rong and Di for fourteen generations, until Gugong Danfu led then away to the mid-Wei River valley where they built their capital near Mount Qi.

During the Eastern Zhou, the Chinese states—particularly Jin—expanded into Di territories, after which the Di were often their enemies. The "White Di" lived north of Qin and west of the Yellow River in what is now northern Shaanxi through the first half of the Spring and Autumn period; tribes began crossing the river into northern Shanxi in the second half.

- 676-651 BC: Duke Xian of Jin conquered a number of Rong and Di groups.
- 662 BC: The Di drove the Rong out of Taiyuan.
- 662-659 BC: The state of Xing was nearly destroyed by the Red Di until it was rescued by the State of Qi.
- 660 BC: The Red Di took the capital of the State of Wey and killed its ruler, but were driven out by Qi.
- 660 to 507 BC: Jin fought many wars with the Di.
- 650 BC: the Red Di destroyed the state of Wen (温).
- 647 BC: the Red Di attacked Wey State again and besieged Chuqiu.
- 646 BC: the Red Di attacked the state of Zheng.
- 644 BC: the Red Di crossed the Fen river to attack Jin.

The Di eventually also established treaties of marriage and trade with the various Chinese states. The Jin prince Chong'er fled to his mother's family among them for many years until assassins sent by his brother forced him to begin wandering through the Chinese states.

- 640 BC: The Di were allied with Qi and Xing against Wey.
- 639 BC: the Di, acting on behalf of Xing, again invaded Wey.
- 636 BC: The Di helped the Zhou king against the state of Cheng.

The Xianyu and "White Di" moved east from the areas around the Yellow River in north Shaanxi and northwest Shanxi into the Taihang Mountains of Shanxi and Hebei during the 6th century BC. The "White Di" were especially numerous on the upper reaches of the Xinding or Hutuo Valley.

- 630 BC: the Di invaded the state of Qi. They would invade Qi numerous times in 627, 623, 618, 604, and 606 BC.
- 629 BC: the Di besieged the State of Wey, forcing Wey to move its capital from Chuqiu to Diqiu.
- 594 BC: Jin 'destroyed' the Red Di state of Lushi (潞氏).

In 569 BC, the Dao Duke of Jin announced a new peaceful policy towards the barbarians (和戎, he Rong). He ended Jin's expansionist invasions of foreign lands and instead bartered with their leaders, purchasing territory for valuable Chinese objects like ritual bronzes and bells. During this period, the "White Di" began to move east of Taiyuan and the Taihang Mountains.

In 541 BC, Jin ceased the He Rong policy and became violent again, attacking the Wuzhong (無終) and the "Numerous Di" (群狄, Qundi) in what is now Taiyuan Prefecture.

- 541 BC: Jin 'subjugated' the Red Di state of Lushi.

From the Taiyuan Basin, Jin pushed east through the Jingxing Pass (井陘) and attacked the "White Di" in the Taihang Mountains (530–520 BC). By this time, the Di had walled towns like Fei, Gu, and Qiu You (仇由) and fought on foot.

- 531 BC: Jin attacked the Xianyu and Fei.
- 507 BC: Jin was severely defeated by the Xianyu Di.
- 406 BC: Zhongshan was conquered by the State of Wei.

By 400 BC, most of the Di and Rong had been eliminated as independent polities.

- 377 BC: Zhongshan regained its independence.
- 295 BC: Zhongshan was conquered by the State of Zhao.
- c. 283-265 BC: Tian Dan fought with Di who lived in the state of Qi.

== See also ==
- Xirong
- Khitan people
- Wuhuan
- Xianbei
- Xionites
- Kingdoms of Zhongshan and Dai
- Five Barbarians (Hu), Eastern Barbarians (Donghu), and Xiongnu
- Di, one people among the Five Barbarians
- Tiele.
- Dingling
