= Xibaipo =

Coordinates: 38.31762°N 114.01269°E

Xibaipo 西柏坡镇
- Town
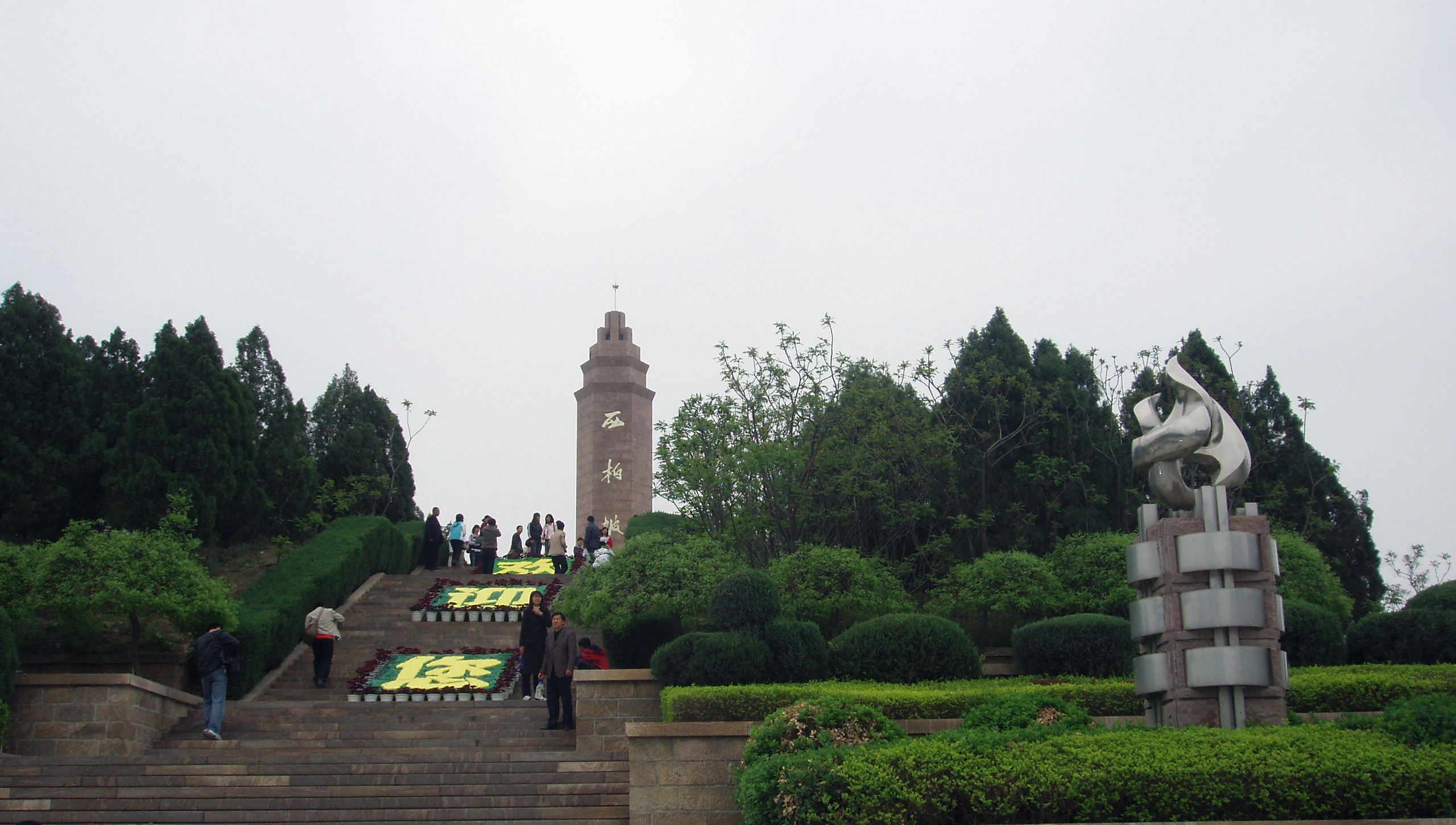
- Site of Central Committee of the Chinese Communist Party during 1947–1949
- Interactive map of Xibaipo
- Country: China
- Province: Hebei
- Prefecture: Shijiazhuang
- County: Pingshan County

Population
  - Total: 5,142
- Time zone: UTC+8 (China Standard Time)

Xibaipo (Chinese: 西柏坡镇) is a township-level division of Pingshan County, Shijiazhuang, the capital of Hebei, China. Xibaipo is where the Central Committee of the Chinese Communist Party and Chairman Mao commanded the three major battles during the Chinese Civil War in and around the province of Hebei. The town also holds the great historic significance as it was the location of the Second Plenary Session of the 7th CCP Central Committee and the National Land Conference, which emancipated all China. The town is considered to be a 5-A tourist attraction due to its great importance in Communist Chinese history, embracing the Red Tourism phenomenon.

It is located along the Hutuo River, at the eastern foot of the Taihang Mountains which gave the village rather fertile soils, making it a great place for agriculture. It overlooks the Gangnan Dam, creating the Nanshuiku reservoir. Its location was moved 500 meters from its original site in 1970 due to the dam, where it sits today.

== History ==
The town was founded during the Tang Dynasty, originally being named 'Baibo'. During the Republic of China period, the town had been renamed to 'Xibaipo'. Many artifacts from the pre-Qing era have been dug up around the area of Xibaipo, many of which can be viewed in the towns local museum. The museum has ~150 artifacts and items available for display, however the museum has collected over 2,000

In 1947, the Central Working Committee, led by Liu Shaoqi and Zhu De, was stationed in Xibaipo, and the China Land Conference was held later that year. As well, the outline of Chinas Land Law was written and prepared by Shaoqi. This began the elimination of semi-feudal land ownership in China, and marked a shift towards collectivisation under Mao Zedong.

In May of 1948, Mao, Zhou Enlai and Ren Bishi moved the leadership of the Central Committee of China and the People's Liberation Army to be headquartered in Xibaipo. Here, they organised and executed several decisive battles during the Chinese Civil War, such as Liaoshen and Huaihai. On top of this, the Second Plenary Session of the Seventh Central Committee of the CCP was held here, giving the small town its current fame and importance to the Communists. The Central Committee had left the town by March of the next year, however they left a legacy and a claim to fame that not many other towns have. 30 years after this, the Chinese government decided to open the former headquarters of the Central Committee and the PLA to the public, and the Xibaipo Memorial Hall was opened around the same time.

In 1956, the village was designated as the ideal location for a dam to be constructed. Two years later in 1958, the Gangnan Reservoir and Dam was being worked on, which led to Xibaipo, alongside 20 other smaller villages, to be relocated slightly southwest (approx. 500m) to prevent major flooding.

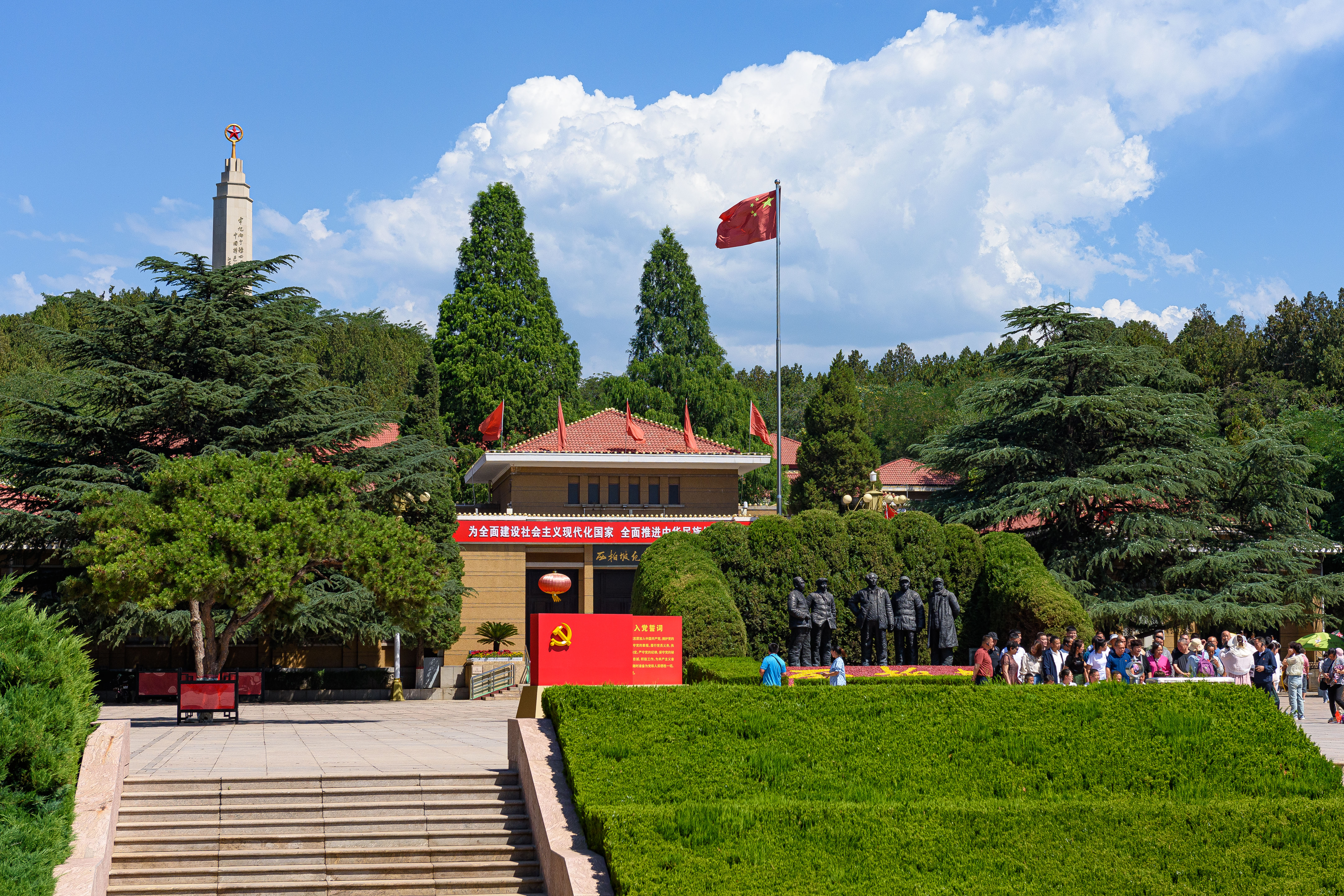
Xibaipo Memorial Hall

== See also ==
- List of township-level divisions of Hebei
- Central Committee of the PRC
- Quintuple-A Locations in China
