= Shangguanyintang Township =

Coordinates: 38°32′18″N 113°49′59″E

Shangguanyintang Township 上观音堂乡
- Township

Chinese transcription(s)
- Interactive map of Shangguanyintang Township
- Country: China
- Province: Hebei
- Prefecture: Shijiazhuang
- County: Pingshan County
- Time zone: UTC+8 (China Standard Time)

Shangguanyintang Township (Chinese: 上观音堂乡) is a township-level division of Pingshan County, Shijiazhuang, Hebei, China.

== See also ==
- List of township-level divisions of Hebei
