= Sujiazhuang Township =

Coordinates: 38°24′25″N 114°00′12″E

Sujiazhuang Township 苏家庄乡
- Township

Chinese transcription(s)
- Interactive map of Sujiazhuang Township
- Country: China
- Province: Hebei
- Prefecture: Shijiazhuang
- County: Pingshan County
- Time zone: UTC+8 (China Standard Time)

Sujiazhuang Township (Chinese: 苏家庄乡) is a township-level division of Pingshan County, Shijiazhuang, Hebei, China.

== See also ==
- List of township-level divisions of Hebei
