= Gangnan, Hebei =

Gangnan 岗南镇
- Town
- Location in Hebei
- Coordinates: 38°19′14″N 114°01′13″E
- Country: People's Republic of China
- Province: Hebei
- Prefecture-level city: Shijiazhuang
- County: Pingshan
- Village-level divisions: 44 villages

Area
  - Total: 110.2 km^{2} (42.5 sq mi)
- Elevation: 144 m (472 ft)

Population (2010 census)
  - Total: 27,115
  - Density: 246.1/km^{2} (637.3/sq mi)
- Time zone: UTC+8 (China Standard)
- Area code: 0311

Gangnan (simplified Chinese: 岗南; traditional Chinese: 崗南; pinyin: Gǎngnán) is a town of Pingshan County in the eastern foothills of the Taihang Mountains in southwestern Hebei province, China, located 8 kilometres (5.0 mi) northeast of the county seat near the Gangnan Reservoir (zh:岗南水库) of the Hutuo River (zh:滹沱河). As of 2011, it has 44 villages under its administration.

== See also ==
- List of township-level divisions of Hebei
