= Zhaibei Township =

Coordinates: 38°28′20″N 113°59′50″E

Zhaibei Township 宅北乡
- Township

Chinese transcription(s)
- Interactive map of Zhaibei Township
- Country: China
- Province: Hebei
- Prefecture: Shijiazhuang
- County: Pingshan County
- Time zone: UTC+8 (China Standard Time)

Zhaibei Township (Chinese: 宅北乡) is a township-level division of Pingshan County, Shijiazhuang, Hebei, China.

== See also ==
- List of township-level divisions of Hebei
