= Xiahuai =

Coordinates: 38°21′27″N 113°51′07″E

Xiahuai 下槐镇
- Town

Chinese transcription(s)
- Interactive map of Xiahuai
- Country: China
- Province: Hebei
- Prefecture: Shijiazhuang
- County: Pingshan County
- Time zone: UTC+8 (China Standard Time)

Xiahuai (Chinese: 下槐镇) is a township-level division of Pingshan County, Shijiazhuang, Hebei, China.

== See also ==
- List of township-level divisions of Hebei
