= Donghuishe =

Donghuishe 东回舍镇
- Town
- Location in Hebei
- Coordinates: 38°15′48″N 114°05′26″E
- Country: People's Republic of China
- Province: Hebei
- Prefecture-level city: Shijiazhuang
- County: Pingshan
- Village-level divisions: 37 villages

Area
  - Total: 78.47 km^{2} (30.30 sq mi)
- Elevation: 173 m (568 ft)

Population (2010 census)
  - Total: 34,523
  - Density: 440.0/km^{2} (1,139/sq mi)
- Time zone: UTC+8 (China Standard)
- Area code: 0311

Donghuishe (simplified Chinese: 东回舍; traditional Chinese: 東回舍; pinyin: Dōnghuíshè) is a town of Pingshan County in the eastern foothills of the Taihang Mountains in southwestern Hebei province, China, located 8 kilometres (5.0 mi) west of the county seat. As of 2011, it has 37 villages under its administration.

== See also ==
- List of township-level divisions of Hebei
