= Xiaojue =

Coordinates: 38°23′43″N 113°42′53″E

Xiaojue 小觉镇
- Town

Chinese transcription(s)
- Interactive map of Xiaojue
- Country: China
- Province: Hebei
- Prefecture: Shijiazhuang
- County: Pingshan County
- Time zone: UTC+8 (China Standard Time)

Xiaojue (Chinese: 小觉镇) is a township-level division of Pingshan County, Shijiazhuang, Hebei, China.

== See also ==
- List of township-level divisions of Hebei
