= Beiye Township =

Beiye Township 北冶乡
- Township
- Location in Hebei Beiye Township (China)
- Coordinates: 38°15′02″N 113°48′20″E
- Country: People's Republic of China
- Province: Hebei
- Prefecture-level city: Shijiazhuang
- County: Pingshan
- Village-level divisions: 39 villages
- Elevation: 338 m (1,109 ft)
- Time zone: UTC+8 (China Standard)
- Area code: 0311

Beiye (Chinese: 北冶; pinyin: Běiyě) is a township of Pingshan County in the Taihang Mountains of southwestern Hebei province, China, located around 8 kilometres (5.0 mi) from the border with Shanxi and 15 km (9.3 mi) west of the county seat. As of 2011, it had 39 villages under its administration.

== See also ==
- List of township-level divisions of Hebei
