= Dongwangpo Township =

Dongwangpo Township 东王坡乡
- Township
- Location in Hebei
- Coordinates: 38°26′53″N 114°07′51″E
- Country: People's Republic of China
- Province: Hebei
- Prefecture-level city: Shijiazhuang
- County: Pingshan
- Village-level divisions: 35 villages
- Elevation: 180 m (590 ft)
- Time zone: UTC+8 (China Standard)
- Area code: 0311

Dongwangpo Township (simplified Chinese: 东王坡乡; traditional Chinese: 東王坡鄉; pinyin: Dōngwángpō Xiāng) is a township of Pingshan County in the eastern foothills of the Taihang Mountains in western Hebei province, China. As of 2011, it has 35 villages under its administration.

== See also ==
- List of township-level divisions of Hebei
