= Xiakou, Shijiazhuang =

Xiakou 下口镇
- Town
- Location in Hebei
- Coordinates: 38.26771°N 113.6467°E
- Country: China
- Province: Hebei
- Prefecture-level city: Shijiazhuang
- County: Pingshan County
- Time zone: UTC+8 (China Standard Time)

Xiakou (Chinese: 下口; pinyin: Xiàkǒu) is a town of Pingshan County, Shijiazhuang, Hebei, China. As of 2018, it has 20 villages under its administration.

== See also ==
- List of township-level divisions of Hebei
