= Hehekou Township =

Hehekou Township 合河口乡
- Township
- Location in Hebei
- Coordinates: 38°36′56″N 114°47′19″E
- Country: People's Republic of China
- Province: Hebei
- Prefecture-level city: Shijiazhuang
- County: Pingshan
- Village-level divisions: 21 villages
- Elevation: 780 m (2,560 ft)
- Time zone: UTC+8 (China Standard)
- Area code: 0311

Hehekou (Chinese: 合河口; pinyin: Héhékǒu) is a township of Pingshan County in the Taihang Mountains of western Hebei province, China, located about 8 kilometres (5.0 mi) from the border with Shanxi and 42 km (26 mi) northwest of the county seat, as the crow flies. As of 2011, it has 21 villages under its administration.

== See also ==
- List of township-level divisions of Hebei
