= Shangsanji Township =

Coordinates: 38°19′20″N 114°14′00″E

Shangsanji Township 上三汲乡
- Township

Chinese transcription(s)
- Interactive map of Shangsanji Township
- Country: China
- Province: Hebei
- Prefecture: Shijiazhuang
- County: Pingshan County
- Time zone: UTC+8 (China Standard Time)

Shangsanji Township (Chinese: 上三汲乡) is a township-level division of Pingshan County, Shijiazhuang, Hebei, China.

== See also ==
- List of township-level divisions of Hebei
