= Nandian, Hebei =

Coordinates: 38.3777°N 114.1330°E

Nandian 南甸镇
- Town

Chinese transcription(s)
- Interactive map of Nandian
- Country: China
- Province: Hebei
- Prefecture: Shijiazhuang
- County: Pingshan County

Area
  - Total: 63.73 km^{2} (24.61 sq mi)

Population (2010 census)
  - Total: 23,586
  - Density: 370.1/km^{2} (958.5/sq mi)
- Time zone: UTC+8 (China Standard Time)

Nandian (Chinese: 南甸镇) is a township-level division of Pingshan County, Shijiazhuang, Hebei, China.

== See also ==
- List of township-level divisions of Hebei
