= Yingli Township =

Coordinates: 38°29′03″N 113°39′16″E

Yingli Township 营里乡
- Township

Chinese transcription(s)
- Interactive map of Yingli Township
- Country: China
- Province: Hebei
- Prefecture: Shijiazhuang
- County: Pingshan County
- Time zone: UTC+8 (China Standard Time)

Yingli Township (Chinese: 营里乡) is a township-level division of Pingshan County, Shijiazhuang, Hebei, China.

== See also ==
- List of township-level divisions of Hebei
