= Yangjiaqiao Township =

Coordinates: 38°24′33″N 113°36′39″E

Yangjiaqiao Township 杨家桥乡
- Township

Chinese transcription(s)
- Interactive map of Yangjiaqiao Township
- Country: China
- Province: Hebei
- Prefecture: Shijiazhuang
- County: Pingshan County
- Time zone: UTC+8 (China Standard Time)

Yangjiaqiao Township (Chinese: 杨家桥乡) is a township-level division of Pingshan County, Shijiazhuang, Hebei, China.

== See also ==
- List of township-level divisions of Hebei
