= Wentang, Hebei =

Coordinates: 38.2593°N 113.9814°E

Wentang 温塘镇
- Town

Chinese transcription(s)
- Interactive map of Wentang
- Country: China
- Province: Hebei
- Prefecture: Shijiazhuang
- County: Pingshan County
- Time zone: UTC+8 (China Standard Time)

Wentang (Chinese: 温塘镇) is a township-level division of Pingshan County, Shijiazhuang, Hebei, China.

== See also ==
- List of township-level divisions of Hebei
