= Zhongshan (state) =

Former country during Warring States period of China

State of Zhongshan 中山國
- 414/381–296 BCE
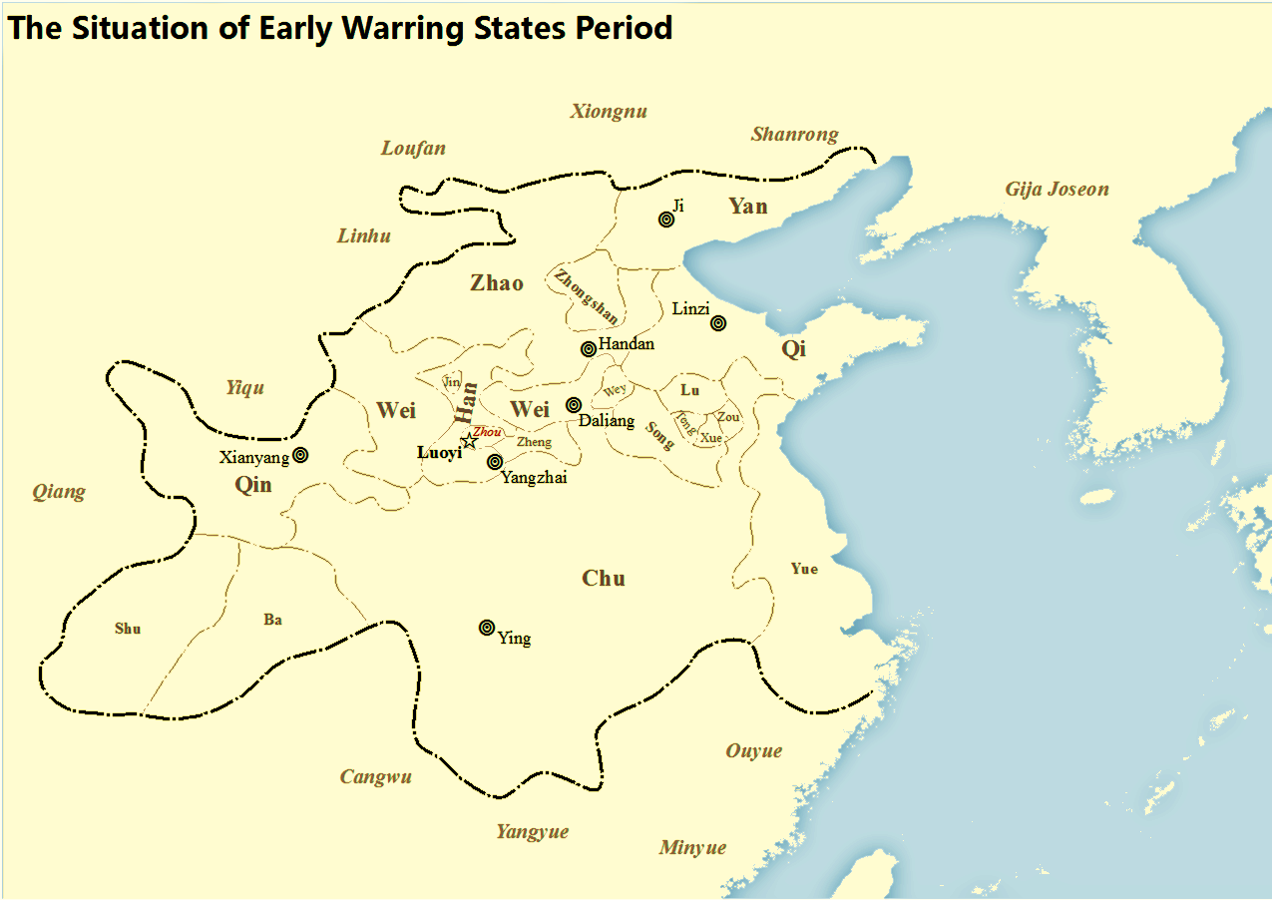
- State of Zhongshan was in northern China
- Capital: Gu (顧); Lingshou (靈壽)
- Common languages: Old Chinese
- Government: Duke, King
- Historical era: Warring States
  - Established: 414/381
  - Conquered by Zhao: 296 BCE
Preceded by	Succeeded by
Xianyu (state)	Zhao (state)

Zhongshan (Chinese: 中山; pinyin: Zhōngshān) was an ancient state that existed during the Warring States period, which managed to survive for almost 120 years despite its small size. The origins of its founder are a matter of contention between scholars.

== Origins ==
The origin of the Zhongshan state is disputed; some sources, such as the Records of the Grand Historian, label the state as being founded and ruled by Beidi (北狄), while others only list them as not being Zhou or Han. Zhongshan occupies roughly the same place as the earlier Xianyu state. The two countries, being Zhongshan and Xianyu, have a muddled history, as the term Zhongshan begins somewhat before the term Xianyu ends. Zhongshan, meaning central mountains, is first mentioned in 506 BC, by a Jin minister, as a hostile neighboring state. The last mention of the Xianyu, meanwhile, is in 489 BC, when Zhao Yang, a Jin minister, leads a military campaign against them.

There are three reasons Zhongshan is often considered a continuation of Xianyu: Both had similar relationships with Qi and Jin, the two states were located in almost exactly the same place, and there is no historical record of Xianyu being conquered. It is considered possible that the name change marks a transition from a loosely-controlled confederation of Di tribes, to a more centralized state. One challenge to this theory of continuation is that after Zhongshan was conquered in 407–406, by the state of Wei, Marquess Wen of Wei gave the land to his eldest son Ji, and the state was based upon this. However this theory is contradicted by a line of the Shiji, in which it states that the new state of Zhongshan came some time after this. Some theories postulate that this new state was a continuation of the earlier Xianyu, and others saying the ruling family of the new Zhongshan came from a line of the Zhou. Because of this, there is no definitive answer as to the ethnicity of Zhongshan, or even to the ethnicity of the royal family; however, it is known that the country's population was mixed.

== History ==
The first major event of Zhongshan was the capital being placed at Gu, in 414 BC, during the reign of Duke Wu, traditionally considered the founding of the country itself. Soon after this, in 407, Zhongshan was conquered by Wei troops, led by general Yue Yang. It is said that Yue Yang's son was living in Zhongshan when war was declared, and was taken hostage. He was paraded before Yue Yang in order to weaken morale, but when this failed, they killed his son and made him into stew, before sending part of said stew to Yue Yang, which he drank in front of the Zhongshan messenger to show resolve. Shortly after, in 381, Zhongshan won its independence back.

Zhongshan invaded Yan in 315, after Yan's king, Zi Kuai, abdicated his throne to his chancellor, Zi Zhi. Qi and Zhongshan both separately invaded Yan. Zhongshan seized copper mines in this war, which had previously belonged to the Donghu, but which had been taken by Yan in war. Zhongshan's troops were led by Sima Zhou.

In 306, after the state of Zhao, under King Wuling of Zhao, finished a military reform, adopting the uniforms and tactics of the Hu nomads, they invaded Zhongshan. After ten years of war Zhao annexed them in 296.

== Foreign relations ==
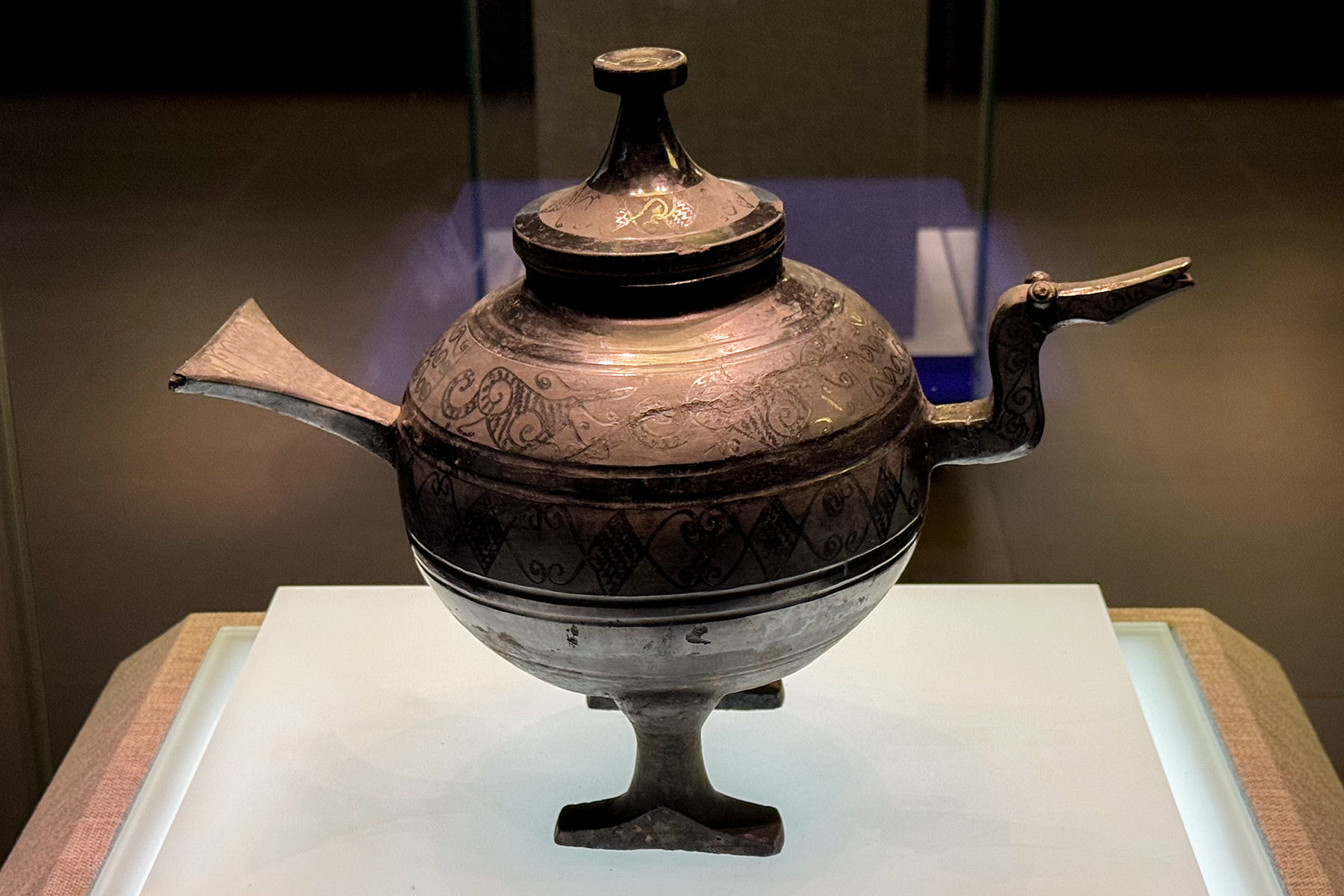
Black pottery vessel, Zhongshan state.

Zhongshan was unusual in that despite being such a small nation, it managed to survive for a long time, considering that many countries, large and small, of the Warring States period lived very short lifespans. Guo Songtao credits this to shrewd diplomacy, saying: "In the rises and falls of the Warring States, Zhongshan seems to be the unnoticed hub and lynchpin." Despite their small size, they demonstrated impressive resilience and strength; they are the only small nation to be given their own chapter in the Strategies of the Warring States.

In 323 BC, Zhongshan formed a vertical alliance, allying itself with Wei, Han, Zhao, and Yan, in order to defend themselves against larger states like Qin, Qi, and Chu. This alliance allowed the states in it to claim the title of wang (a title roughly equivalent to King). King Wei of Qi, who had 11 years earlier taken the title of wang for himself, objected to this, saying: "I am ashamed to be a king[,] if the ruler of Zhongshan can be one too". He later went on to say: "I am a state of ten thousand chariots and Zhongshan is one of a thousand chariots, how dare she [Zhongshan] assume a title the equal of mine?". An important part of this statement can be seen in his reason for denouncing them claiming kingship is not that they were non-Chinese (Huaxi), which would very likely have been mentioned in the insult if it were true. The fact that Zhongshan was invited to the five state alliance is seen as another proof of them being Chinese, as a barbarian (Yi) country would never be invited to such an alliance. After this, King Wei of Qi asked Wei and Zhao to join him in attacking Zhongshan, to force them to abolish their title of wang, however, King Cuo sent an advisor, Zhang Deng, to these states, and successfully sowed discord and distrust amongst them, and no such alliance was formed.

=== Zhao ===
The state of Zhao surrounded Zhongshan almost entirely, with only Zhongshan's northeastern border being outside of Zhao. For this reason, they were considered to be a "disease in the heart and belly" by the Zhao kings. From 307 BC on, Zhao attacked Zhongshan almost every year, until, in 301, the king of Zhongshan was forced to take refuge in Qi. During this time Qi declared war on and invaded Chu; seeing that Qi was occupied with a war of their own, Zhao pushed deep into Zhongshan, and fully conquered them.

== Economy ==
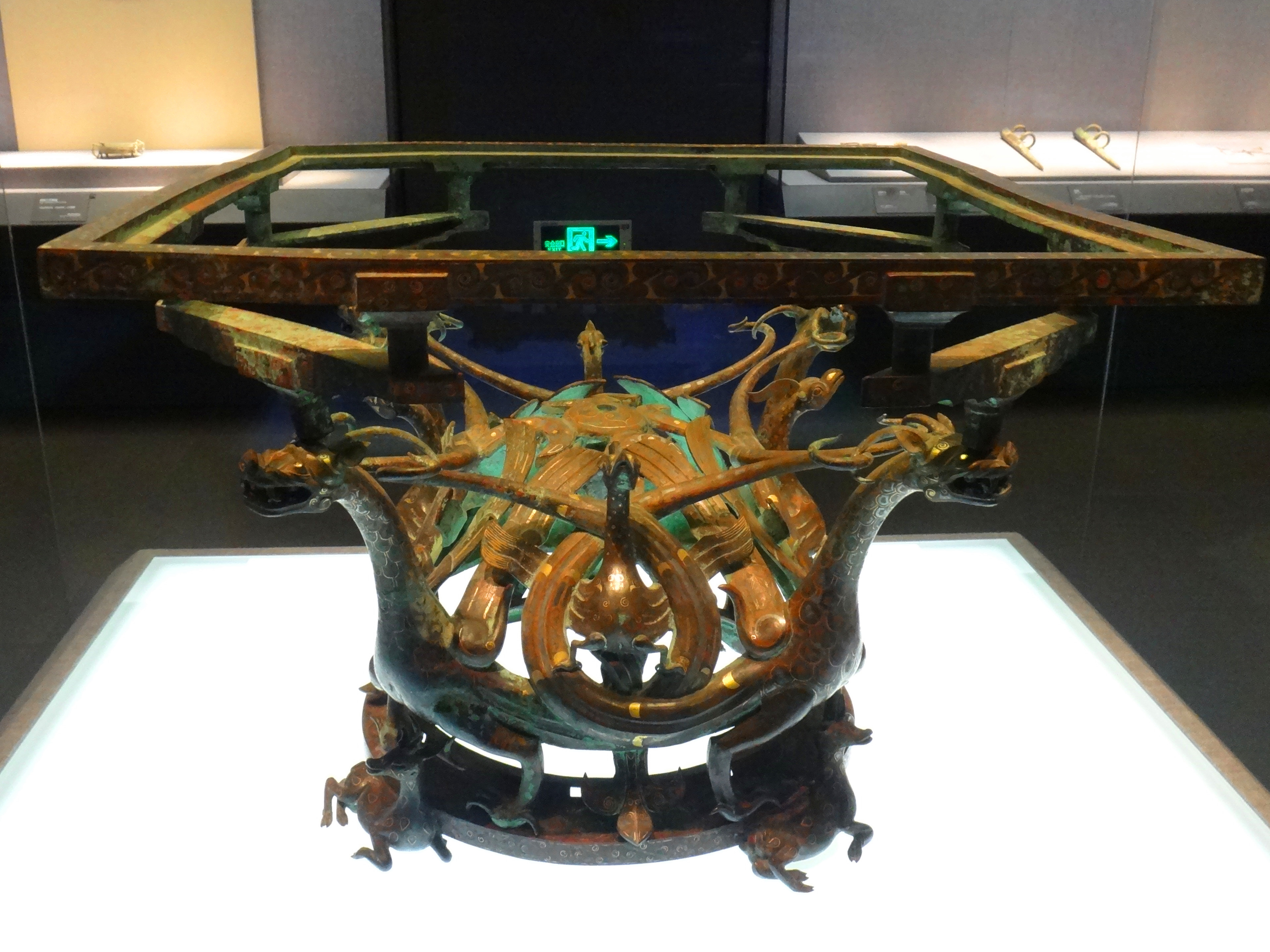
Bronze table decorated with dragons and phoenix from the Tombs of the Kings of Zhongshan in Hebei province.

Due to commonality of finds of iron agricultural tools in the southern part of Zhongshan, compared to the commonality of animal skeletons in the northern part, it is believed that the southern land's economy was mostly agriculture, and the northern land's was mostly from animal husbandry.

=== Currency ===
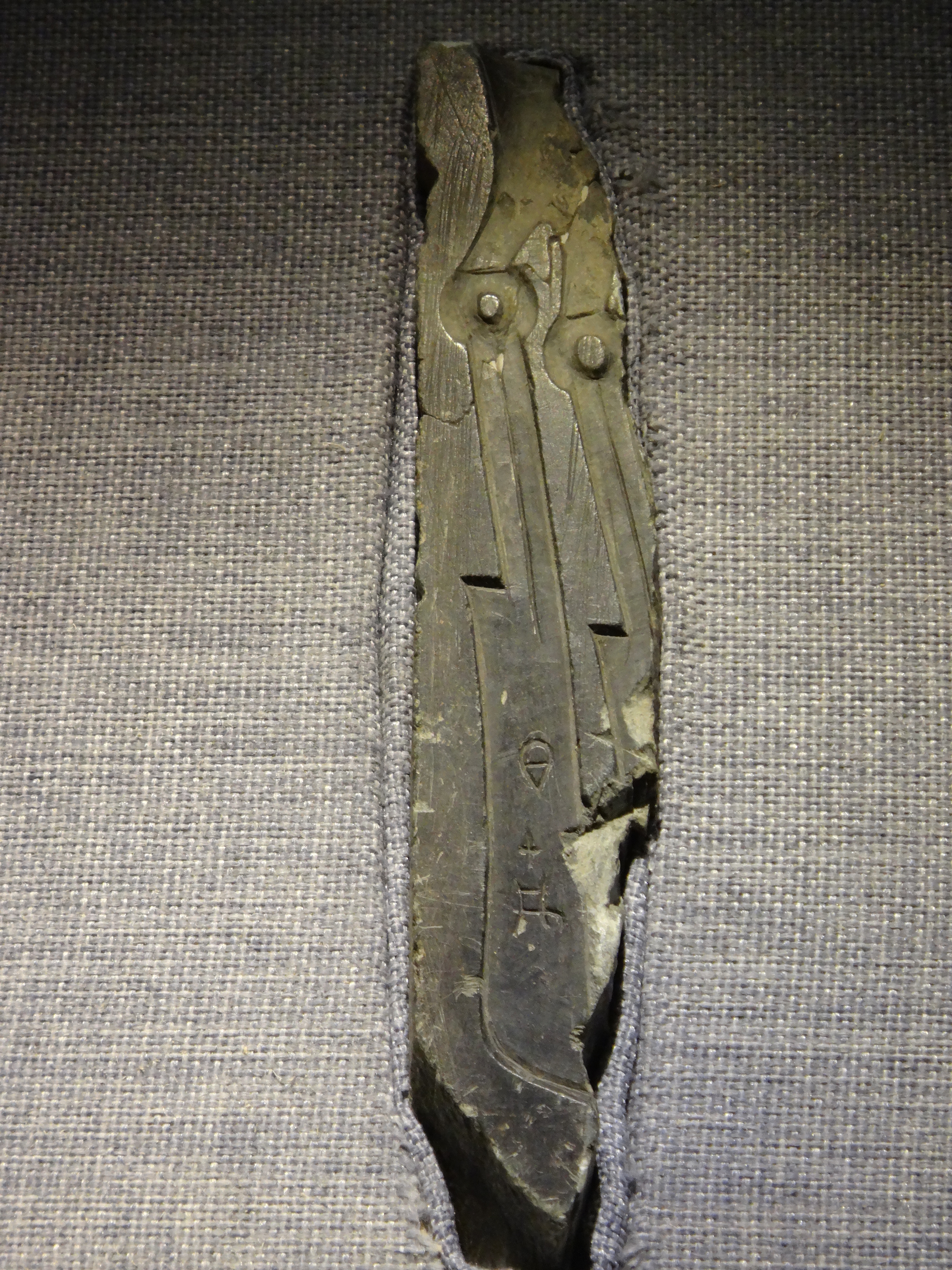
Stone mould of Chengbai style knife coin.

Zhongshan used a currency called chengbo, which took the form of a 15 gram bronze knife-shaped coin. It is known that these coins were made in at least Lingshou.

The level of trade, and the relationship, Zhongshan had with other states can be roughly ascertained from the amount of a currency was found in the ruins of Lingshou: the yan knife coins from Yan were plentiful, with some 374 being found, whereas the gandan, baihua, and lin coins of Zhao are rare, with only 100 of them, combined, found. This reflects the hostile relations Zhao had with Zhongshan, and the good relations Yan had with Zhongshan. Indeed, even the similarities of the yan and chengbo knife coins seems to suggest their friendly relationship, as they were of similar size and of equal weight, with both weighing fifteen grams, meaning that they would be interchangeable.

== Archeology and culture ==
Much of the knowledge of Zhongshan architecture comes from the remains of their capital city, Lingshou, and from the tombs of King Cheng, and his son King Cuo. In the late 1970s, the tombs of both kings were found in Pingshan County, Hebei, and the capital city was found shortly after, in 1976, only a mile to the east of King Cuo's tomb.

=== Tombs ===
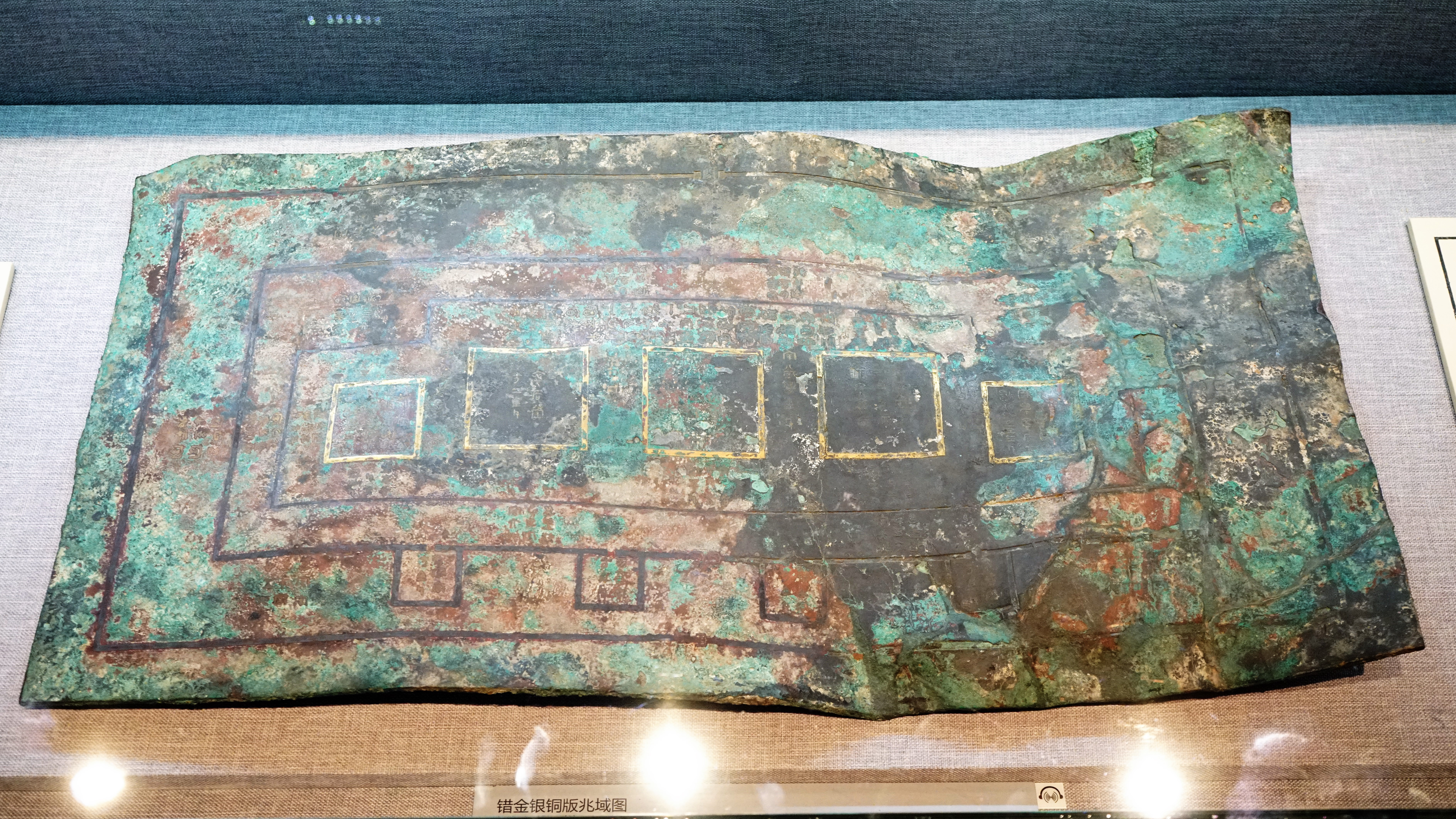
A bronze map of one of the tombs of Zhongshan kings

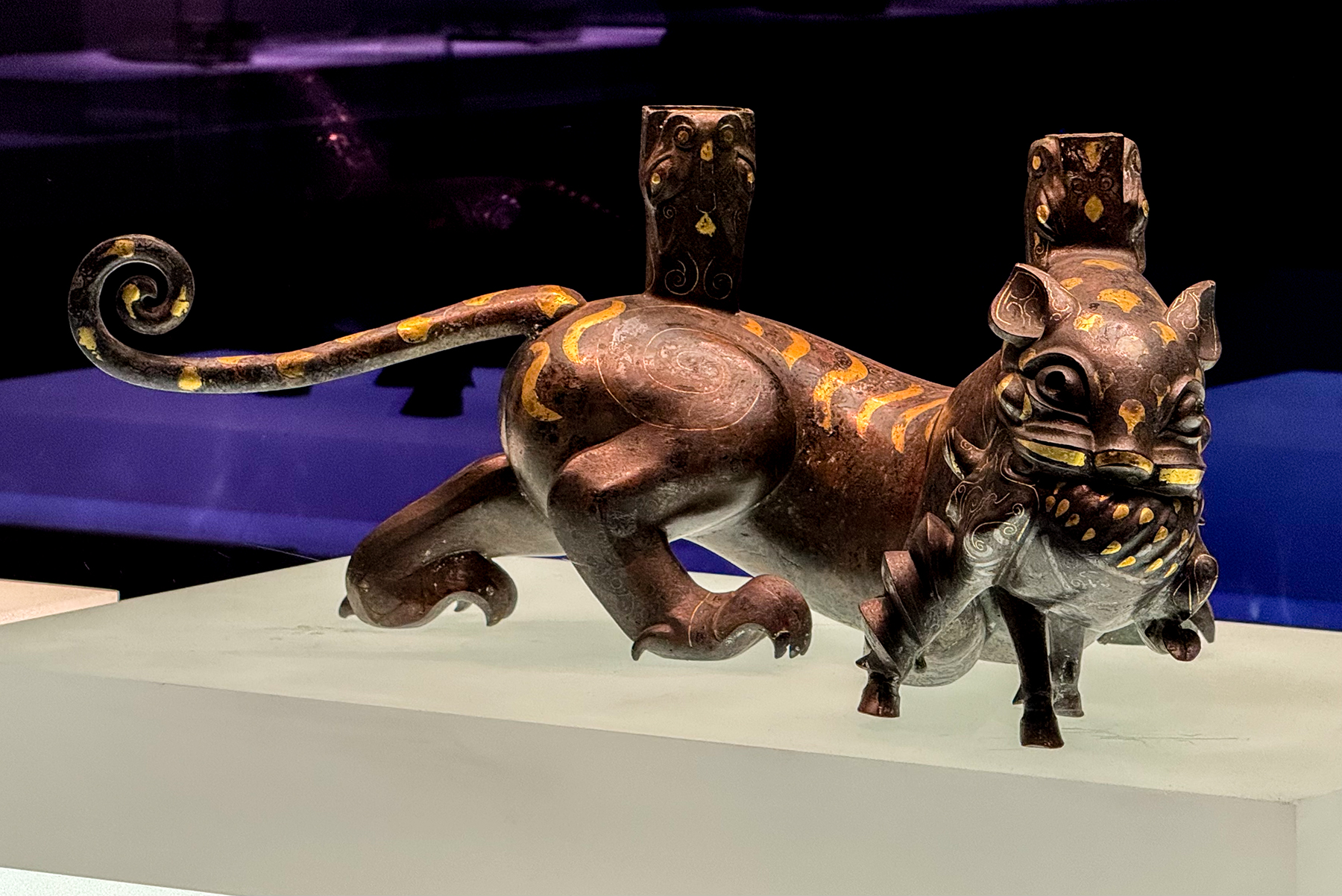
Bronze stand in the form of a tiger from the Zhongshan tombs.

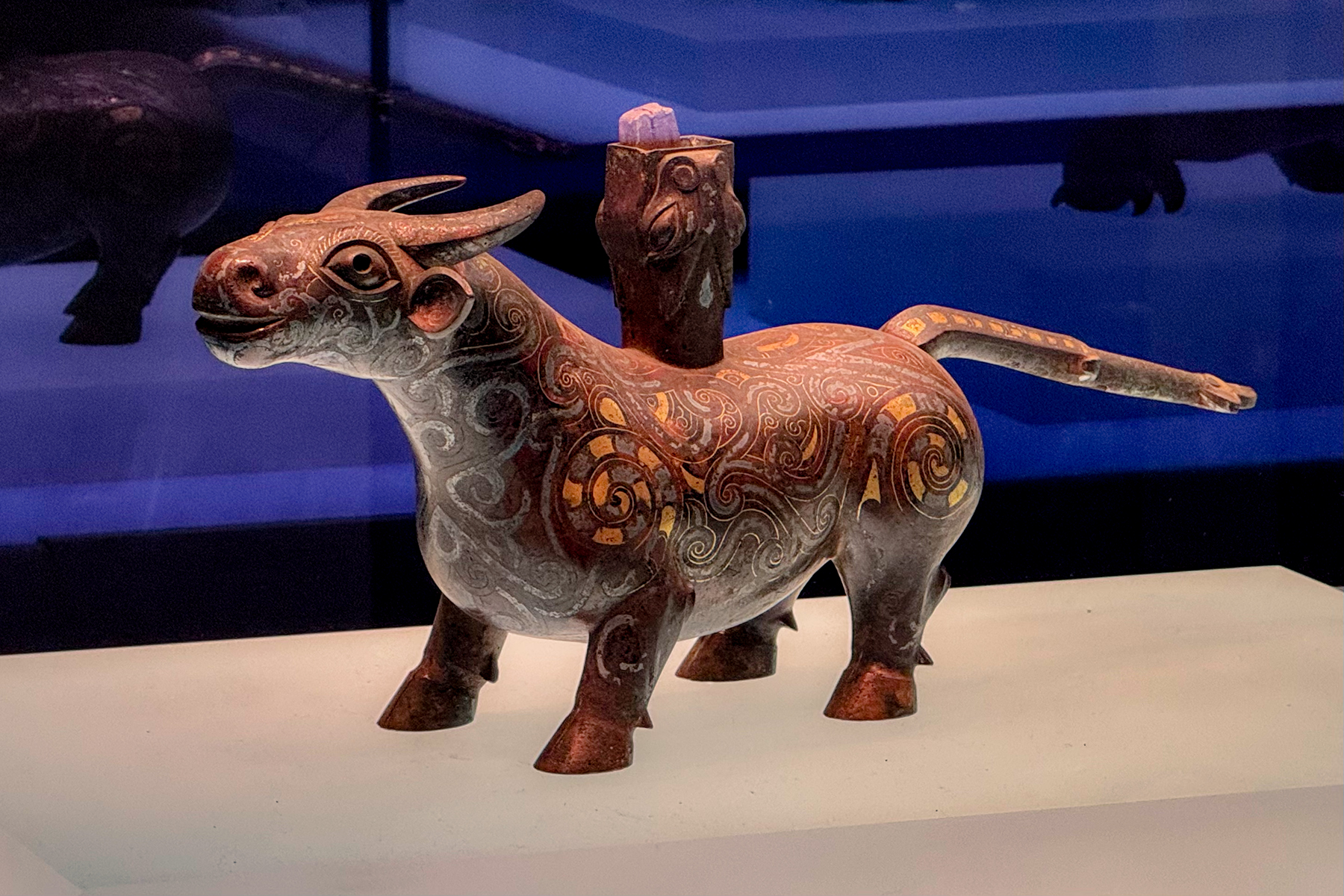
Bronze stand of bovine with gold and silver inlay.

The tombs of the two kings, Cheng and Cuo, were the first find of any Zhongshan architecture, and are considered the richest find of any Chinese state of the 4th century BC. They are the largest of any tombs of the Zhongshan to date. Both of their main chambers had been looted, however their storage chambers were still intact, and contained a large number of artifacts. Many of these ritual vessels found in these tombs were from surrounding warring states, with a few coming from the northern nomads, but the luxury goods were largely of the Zhongshan style. This split, between archeological evidence supporting the thesis that they were a Chinese people (Huaxia), and textual sources claiming them as a non-Chinese people, has caused two fields of thought; one side seeing the Zhongshan as a sinicized minority, an outside group that has been heavily influenced by Chinese culture, and the other seeing them as a Chinese people that were influenced by non-Chinese, nomadic peoples.

=== Cities ===
The site of the Zhongshan capital Lingshou contains many ruins, including the foundations of palaces, workshops for bronze and ceramic, marketplaces, and cemeteries. The cemeteries around Lingshou contain some 125 tombs, and dozens more are scattered throughout the country. The city is believed to have been founded in 380, and to have remained the capital until 296, when Zhongshan was conquered. The city is strategically placed, surrounded on its west, north and south sides by the Taihang Mountains, with its east side facing plains. Like many other capitals of the time, the city was built at the confluence of two rivers. The city was about 4,000 metres (13,000 ft) wide east to west, and 4,500 metres (14,800 ft) wide north to south. Of the cities walls, only the earthen foundation remains, but it is known that they ranged between being 18 metres (59 ft) and 34 metres (112 ft) wide. Two gates can be seen, one on the west side and the other on the north side. Four pounded-earth terraces were attached to the walls, some near the gates. A small hill, called Huangshan, is inside the walls, in the north section of the city. The Shui Jing Zhu says that this hill is what gives the Zhongshan, meaning "central mountain", their name. The hill is believed to have been used as a watchtower. For further fortification, a small city was built 1.5 kilometres (0.93 mi) to the east. This small city/fort was 1,400 metres (4,600 ft) by 1,050 metres (3,440 ft). The remains of the pounded earth and buildings of the centre-western part still stand. This city was used to defend the only angle from which to attack Lingshou, which was clearly placed based upon military considerations, rather than economic or political. Dongyuan was another Zhongshan city, located in present-day Zhengding County, Hebei.

=== Great Wall of Zhongshan ===
Zhongshan is one of the Warring States-era states known to have built its own defensive border wall. The Great Wall of Zhongshan is one of the earliest Great Walls of China. It is estimated to have been built around 369 BC to defend itself against Zhao. In 1988, Hebei archaeologist Li Wenlong conducted a systematic investigation of the Zhongshan Great Wall in Tang County. The Zhongshan Great Wall within Baoding is approximately 49 kilometers long, constructed of stone or a mixture of earth and stone, with remaining widths of 1 to 2.5 meters and heights of 0.4 to 3 meters.

=== Social classes ===
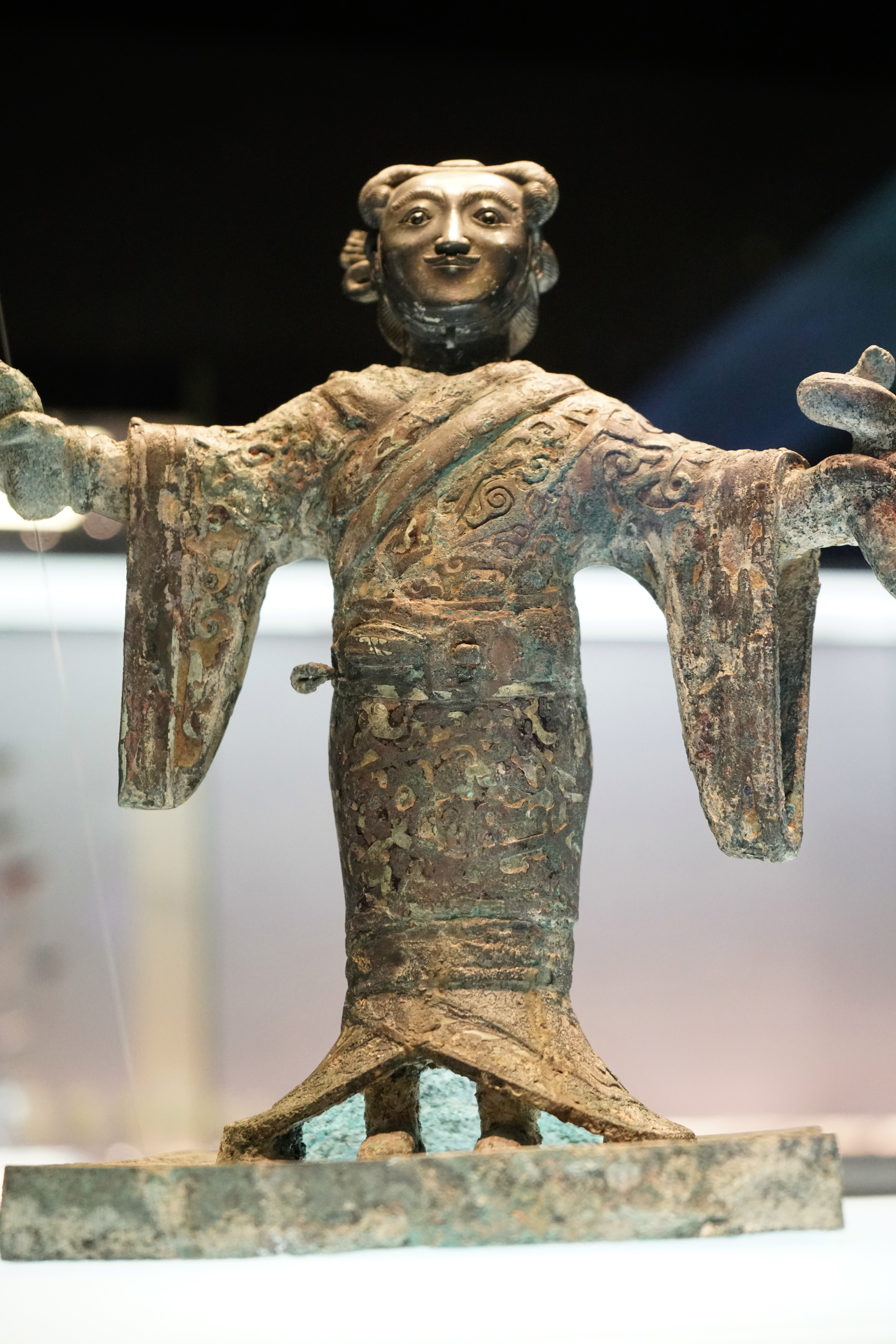
Silver statue from the Zhongshan Kings Tombs

The official that was in charge of managing the tile-making workers in pottery workshops was called a Sikou. The Zhouli describes Sikou to mean an officer in charge of penal codes and convicts, suggesting that Zhongshan's tile production was reliant on, at least in part, convict labor.

=== Religion ===
The ideology of Zhongshan was heavily influenced by Confucian ideals, but it is believed that these ideals were used by the King to legitimize his rule, and his foreign policy, rather than being truly believed by the ruling class. This can be seen in their use of Confucian ideology regarding the ruler being heavenly mandated, in order to attack Yan, and seize cities and materials.

A key religious area, Guocun, was located some 4 kilometers southwest of Lingshou, and contained 142 sacrificial pits. These pits were roughly 1.5 metres (4 ft 11 in) by 0.7 metres (2 ft 4 in) in area, and between 2 metres (6 ft 7 in) and 12 metres (39 ft) deep. In each of these pits, an animal, usually sheep, goats, or cattle, was found with its legs tied together, and was buried with a jade item, usually a pendant or bi disk. These pits, and their contents, are very similar to the sacrificial pits of Jin, where they are believed to have been used ceremonially, to form "oaths of alliances" (mengshi). The connection of the two has been seen as evidence of a strong Jin cultural influence upon the elites of Zhongshan.

=== Language ===
The characters and style of Zhongshan Chinese is closest to the Chinese of the Qi, but was also influenced by the more southern Chinese states. Their style of calligraphy were very slender and graceful, while also being very taut. It is believed that this style of calligraphy was chosen by King Cuo himself, to emphasize his power.

== Military ==
According to the Lüshi Chunqiu the soldiers of Zhongshan wore iron armor, and wielded iron staffs. They were said to be able to field up to a thousand chariots.

== Rulers ==
The seal of King Cuo

1. Duke Wu c. 414 BC
2. Duke Wen
3. Duke Huan
4. Duke Cheng
5. King Cuo: 323–309 BC
6. King Qieci
7. King Shang
