= King Cuo of Zhongshan =

Cuo

King of Zhongshan
- Reign: 323–309 BC
- Predecessor: Position established
- Successor: Qieci (𫲨𧊒)

Duke of Zhongshan
- Reign: 327–323 BC
- Predecessor: Duke Cheng
- Successor: Himself (as King of Zhongshan)
- Born: c. 344 BCE
- Died: 309 BCE
Names
- Ancestral name: Jī (姬); Given name: Cuò (𰯼)
- Father: Duke Cheng of Zhongshan

Chinese name
- Chinese: 中山王𰯼
Transcriptions
Standard Mandarin
- Hanyu Pinyin: Zhōng shān wáng Cuò

King Cuo of Zhongshan (reigned 327–309 BC) was the fifth ruler of the state of Zhongshan during the Warring States period in ancient China. He reigned for 15 years. In 323 BC, he styled himself "king" along with the rulers of Han, Wei, Yan and Zhao, becoming the first ruler of Zhongshan to do so.

As the son of Duke Cheng of Zhongshan, he inherited the state from his father and expanded it to its peak size. He attacked Yan to the north and Zhao to the south and expanded his territory to nearly double what he inherited. His new gains from Zhao broke the state of Zhao into two pieces, North and South, providing the justification for the state of Zhao to seek to destroy Zhongshan.

== Tomb of King Cuo of Zhongshan ==
Yellow Jade Pendant with Design of Kui Dragons. Unearthed from the Accompanying Tomb of King Cuo.

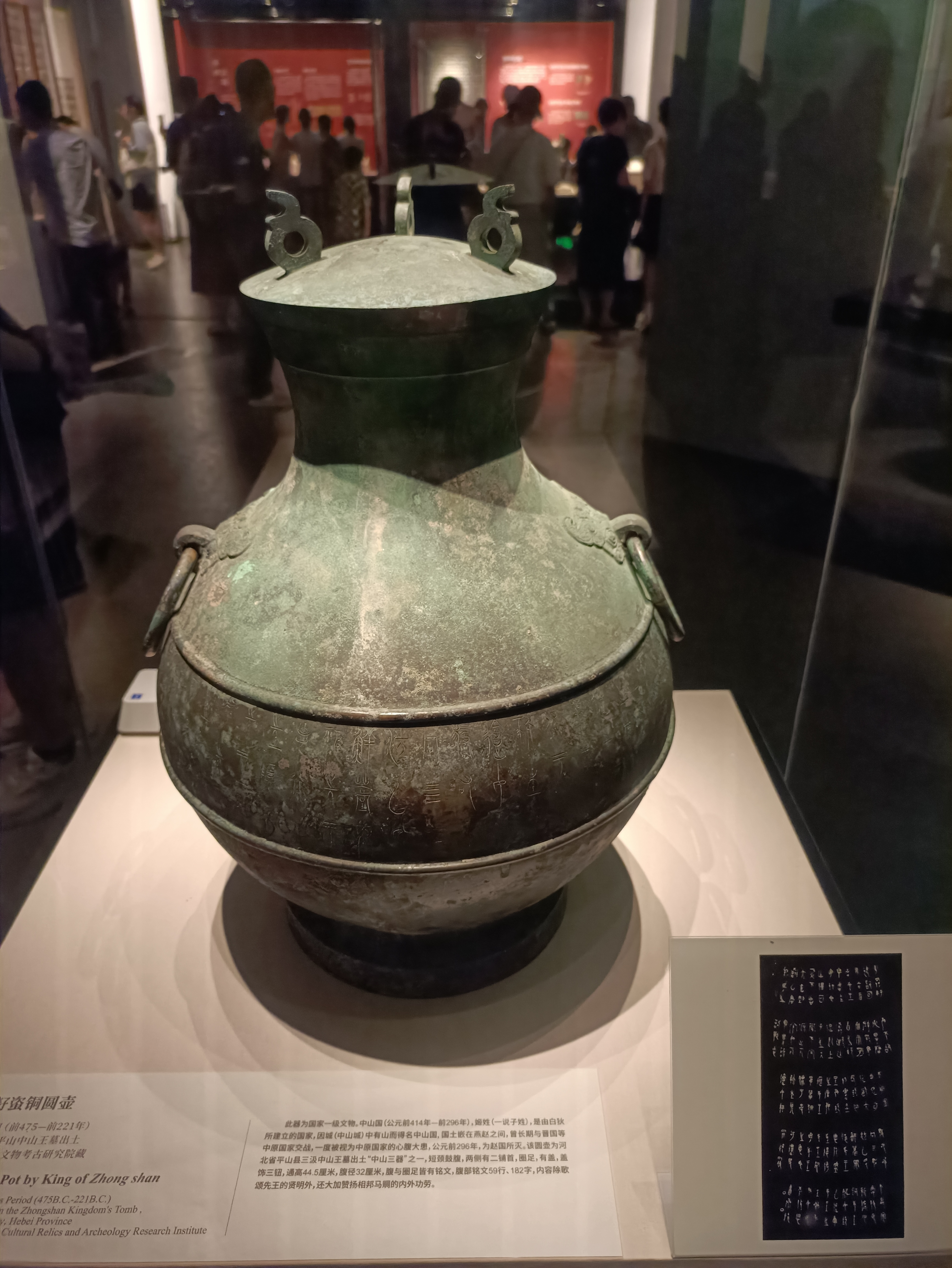
Bronze from the Tomb of Zhongshan King.

The Tomb of King Cuo of Zhongshan is an archaeological site located in Sanji, Pingshan, Hebei, China. The tomb was built near the ancient city of Lingshou (靈壽) on the Hutuo River. The tomb contained the remains of King Cuo.

Initially, farmers discovered a large river rock inscribed in archaic (large seal) characters during the 1940s or 1950s and stored it for several decades. In the early 1970s, local artefact administrators received news of this rock and examined it. A copy was sent to Li Xueqin, a renowned expert on ancient Chinese writing. He immediately recognised its importance. The inscription was about two men, Gongsheng De and Jiujiang Man, who were servants and fishermen during the king's life and later guarded his tomb after his death. Later it was determined that the king was King Cuo from the inscriptions found on the bronze ware.

The plans for the tomb complex were engraved on a bronze diagram found inside the tomb (this is the earliest architectural drawing known from ancient China). The original plan was designed to house five tomb complexes (xiangtang 饗堂) in a row, with the tomb of the king in the centre, flanked by tombs of two queens, then flanked by outer tombs of two consorts. The tomb complex was never completed as designed.

The site was excavated in the 1970s. Although the central burial chamber had already been looted in antiquity, archaeologists were still able to uncover hundreds of bronze, jade, lacquer and pottery artefacts. Six others were buried alongside the king. Two horse and chariot pits were included in King Cuo's burial complex. Three boats were uncovered, and an underground canal linked the tomb to the Hutuo River.

The style and usage of bronze artefacts underwent a drastic change by the time King Cuo died in the fourteenth year of his reign. Among the changes was a de-emphasis on ritual bronze vessels and a new focus on luxury bronze objects. A bronze vessel from the tomb recorded a previously unrecorded invasion of Yan during that year that may have contributed to the change in style; some archaeologists believe that the new techniques may have been introduced by Yan artisans or copied from looted Yan bronzes. The new technique included the use of inlaid silver and gold onto bronze objects, often portraying mythical beasts.
