= Lianghe Township, Hebei =

Lianghe Township 两河乡
- Township
- Location in Hebei
- Coordinates: 38°20′22″N 114°09′40″E
- Country: People's Republic of China
- Province: Hebei
- Prefecture-level city: Shijiazhuang
- County: Pingshan
- Village-level divisions: 23 villages
- Elevation: 144 m (472 ft)
- Time zone: UTC+8 (China Standard)
- Area code: 0311

Lianghe Township (simplified Chinese: 两河乡; traditional Chinese: 兩河鄉; pinyin: Liǎnghé Xiāng; lit. 'two rivers') is a township of Pingshan County in southwestern Hebei province, China, located about 18 kilometres (11 mi) northeast of the county seat. As of 2011, it has 23 villages under its administration.

== See also ==
- List of township-level divisions of Hebei
