= Pingshan, Hebei =

Pingshan 平山镇
- Town
- Interactive map of Pingshan
- Coordinates: 38°15′21″N 114°12′10″E
- Country: People's Republic of China
- Province: Hebei
- Prefecture-level city: Shijiazhuang
- County: Pingshan

Area
  - Total: 120.6 km^{2} (46.6 sq mi)
- Elevation: 136 m (446 ft)

Population (2010 census)
  - Total: 120,631
  - Density: 1,000/km^{2} (2,591/sq mi)
- Time zone: UTC+8 (China Standard Time)

Pingshan (Chinese: 平山; pinyin: Píngshān) is a town in and the seat of Pingshan County, in southwestern Hebei province, China. As of 2011, it has 63 villages under its administration.

== See also ==
- List of township-level divisions of Hebei
