= Xidawu Township =

Coordinates: 38°18′31″N 114°05′50″E

Xidawu Township 西大吾乡
- Township

Chinese transcription(s)
- Interactive map of Xidawu Township
- Country: China
- Province: Hebei
- Prefecture: Shijiazhuang
- County: Pingshan County
- Time zone: UTC+8 (China Standard Time)

Xidawu Township (Chinese: 西大吾乡) is a township-level division of Pingshan County, Shijiazhuang, Hebei, China.

== See also ==
- List of township-level divisions of Hebei
