= Guyue Bridge =

Guyue Bridge 古月桥
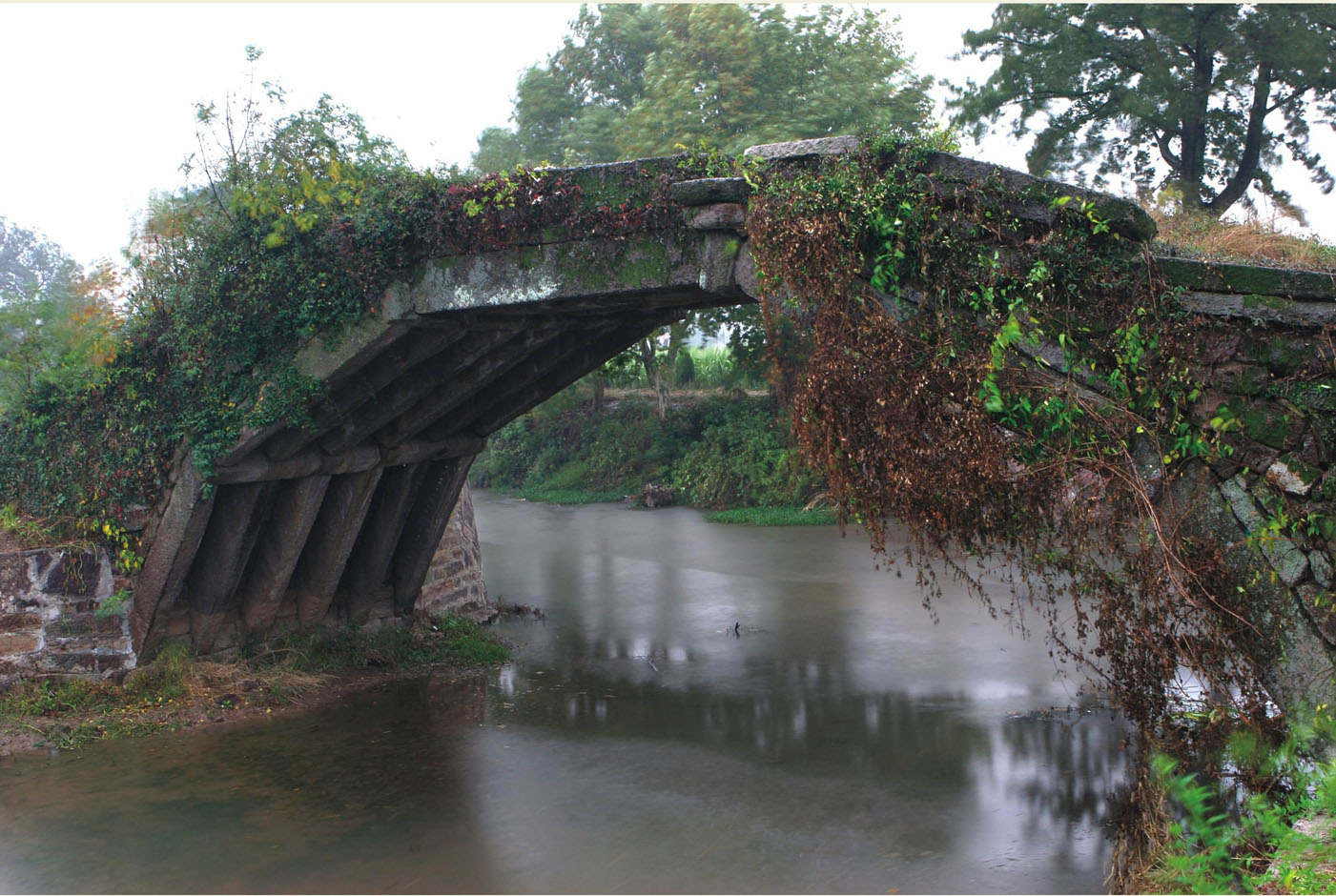
- Guyue Bridge in 2008
- Coordinates: 29°09′44″N 120°04′21″E
- Crosses: Dragon Creek
- Locale: Yiwu, Zhejiang, China
- Official name: 古月桥

Characteristics
- Design: Arch bridge Stone bridge
- Total length: 31.2 m (102 ft)
- Width: 4.5 m (15 ft)
- Height: 4.15 m (14 ft)
- Longest span: 15 m (49 ft)
- No. of spans: 1

History
- Construction end: 1213
- Opened: 1213

The Guyue Bridge (simplified Chinese: 古月桥; traditional Chinese: 古月橋; pinyin: Gǔyuè Qiáo; lit. 'Ancient Moon Bridge') is an arch bridge located in Yiwu, Zhejiang province, China.

== Introduction ==
The bridge is located in Chi'an Town (simplified Chinese: 赤岸镇; traditional Chinese: 赤岸鎮; pinyin: Chì'àn Zhèn), and it is about 100 meters west of Yazhi Street (雅治街). It goes across the Dragon Creek (traditional Chinese: 龍溪, simplified Chinese: 龙溪, pinyin: Lóng Xī).

It is a single span arch bridge. The design is very special: more precisely, its structure feature is girder-arch, and the girders are arranged like ribs. Such a design can be found in the famous painting Along the River During the Qingming Festival of Song dynasty by Zhang Zeduan.

The bridge was completed in 1213, the sixth year of the Jiading Era (Chinese: 嘉定; pinyin: Jiā Dìng), Southern Song dynasty. Since then it has never been rebuilt or repaired.

On the body of the bridge are engraved 12 Chinese characters: Huangsong Jiading Guiyou Jiqiu Runyue Jianzao (simplified Chinese: 皇宋嘉定癸酉季秋润月建造; traditional Chinese: 皇宋嘉定癸酉季秋閏月建造; pinyin: Huáng Sòng Jiā Dìng Guǐ Yǒu Jì Qiū Rùn Yuè Jiàn Zào), which literally means: Constructed in Autumn September Imperial Song Jiangding Era the Year of Guiyou ("Huang" means Imperial. "Song" reveals Song dynasty. "Jiading" is an era 1208-1224 of the Emperor Ningzong of Song. "Guiyou" is the year 1213, it's the Sexagenary cycle-way to record years in traditional Chinese calendar. "Jiqiu" means the late autumn period of a year.

== See also ==
- Stone bridge
- Arch bridge
- Zhaozhou Bridge, a famous Chinese stone arch bridge completed in 605 AD.
- List of bridges in China
