= Xianyu Kingdom =

Xianyu (Chinese: 鲜虞) was a minor state in northern China established by the Beidi Xianyu people during the Western Zhou and Spring and Autumn periods.

== History ==
The name Xianyu first appeared in the Guoyu book Discourses of Zheng (郑语), mentioned by Taishi Bo to Duke Huan of Zheng as one of the Di and Rong tribes conspired to overthrow the Western Zhou.

After the decline of the Western Zhou, the Di people became active and start invading the Central Plains. In 662 BC, the Red Di (赤狄) attacked the state of Xing, and in 660 BC, they destroyed the state of Wey, killing Duke Yi of Wey. Afterwards, the Di established three states in present-day Hebei: Fei (肥), Gu(鼓) and Xianyu, centered in today's Zhending County.

Xianyu and the Di states waged many wars against the state of Jin. In winter 530 BC, the Jin destroyed Fei and attacked the Xianyu capital. The Guliang Zhuan recorded the events, remarking that Jin can be considered as a Di state as it was attacking Xianyu, a Central Plains state. In 520 BC, Gu was conquered by Jin. In 507 BC, the Xianyu people defeated the Jin army at the Battle of Pingzhong and captured the Jin general Guan Hu. From 494 to 491 BC, Xianyu together with Wei, Qi and Lu, intervened in a civil war between the Six Ministers of Jin. Because of this, Xianyu was attacked and conquered by the Jin commander Zhao Yang in 489 BC.

In 506 BC, it was recorded that the Xianyu established a new state at present-day Tang County called Zhongshan, which prospered for another 200 years. The relationship between Xianyu and Zhongshan has long been a subject of academic debate. The main viewpoints are Zhongshan was either a continuation of the Xianyu state, or a separate branch of the Baidi, unconquered by the Jin or it was later enfeoffed by the Zhou to the Ji clan.

Xianyu was one of the states that are known to mint knife money. Pointed-head knife money were initially minted then transitioned to knife-shaped "Chengbai" coins.

== See also ==
- Xianyun
- Xunyu
