= Ying (Chu) =

Ancient Chinese city

- Chinese: 郢
Transcriptions
Standard Mandarin
- Hanyu Pinyin: Yǐng
- Wade–Giles: Ing^{3}

Ying was a capital city of the State of Chu during the Spring and Autumn and Warring States periods of Chinese history.

== History ==
In the early years of Chu's development, the state capital was located at Danyang, near modern-day Xichuan County in Henan Province. Following a number of battles with neighboring states the Chu capital moved to Ying, near modern-day Jingzhou City on the Jianghan Plain in the western part of Hubei Province.

There are four separate theories as to the date that relocation of the capital took place:

- Some sources believe that King Wu of Chu relocated the capital to Ying in 706 BCE. Qing dynasty historian Song Xiangfeng (宋翔风) in his Dynastic records • Research on relocation of Chu Yuxiong’s residence at Danyang to Ying by King Wu (过庭录•楚鬻熊居丹阳武王徙郢考) infers the date of the move from the timing of King Wu's wars with the States of Sui and Yun. Song argues that with wars waging all around and his rule of the Eastern Han River just beginning, King Wu was forced to move. Today many historians consider this theory old fashioned and it has few adherents.
- The second theory postulates that the capital's relocation took place sometime between 703 and 699 BCE. Historian Shi Quan’s Movement date of the Chu capital based on the Zuo Zhuan • 13th Year of Duke Huan of Lu records: “The Mo'Ao (莫敖) (Note: A senior official in the Chu state government) was hanged at Huangyu (荒谷) (modern Jiangling County in Hubei Province), the army were prisoners at Yefu (冶父) awaiting punishment.” In his commentary on the Book of Han, Liu Zhao (刘昭) writes: More than three lǐ to the east of Jiangling there are three lakes and a river called Changyu (苌谷). To the northwest there is a small town called Yefu (冶父). The Commentary on the Waterways Classic in its chapter on floods notes that to the northwest of Jiangling lay Jinan City (纪南城) with its three lakes and river and Huangyu (荒谷) to the east. These sources are used to justify the earlier move to Ying yet none of them mention the town by name making the claim implausible.
- A further viewpoint states that the capital moved in 689 BCE in the first year of the reign of King Wen of Chu. According to Records of the Grand Historian • Chu Family Annals: "Xiong Zi (熊赀), King Wen of Chu began the capital at Ying." Chinese historian Fan Wenlan wrote in his Narrative History of China (中国通史): "During the initial stages of the Eastern Zhou dynasty, Chu was a large and powerful state. In 704 BCE, Xiong Tong (熊通) proclaimed himself King Wu of Chu and his son King Wen moved the capital to Ying some 1000 lǐ away." This view supports the theory that it was King Wen who moved the capital.
- The final theory suggests that the move to Ying took place in 690 BCE on the death of King Wu and the succession of King Wen to the throne. According to the Zuo Zhuan 11th Year of Duke Huan of Lu: "The army of the State of Yun were at Pusao (蒲骚; 蒲騷) together with the armies of the States of Sui, Jiao (绞国; 绞國), Zhou (州) and Liao ready to attack Chu. The Chu Mo'Ao, Qu Xia (屈瑕) was on the outskirts of Ying." However, at this time Ying was merely a command post on the Chu's military front and had not yet become the capital. The Zuo Zhuan 4th Year of Duke Zhuang of Lu records that King Wu died aged 51 in 689 BCE on a punitive expedition to the State of Sui. The people of Chu and Sui crossed the Han River at Jiangyou (江油) to hold the king's funeral. Since Ying is close by this was probably the location of the funeral. King Wen ascended the throne within a few months of his father's death whereupon Ying became the capital of Chu.

As can be seen above, the four theories do not differ widely in their dating of the relocation. According to traditional sources, Ying remained the capital of Chu from the time of its establishment by King Wen in 689 BCE until 278 BCE, the 21st year of the reign of King Qingxiang of Chu when an attack by an army from the State of Qin led by General Bai Qi forced the capital to move to Chen (capital for 37 years), then to Shouchun (18 years) - before being wiped out in 223 BCE. Not counting the short term relocation of the capital during the reign of King Zhao of Chu (reigned 515–489 BCE), Ying served as the Chu capital for a total of 411 years.

== Location ==
According to historian Shi Quan (石泉), Ying was located at the same place as the Qin and Han dynasty Jiangling Commandery (modern-day Jingzhou), between the Ju (沮) and Zhang (漳) rivers. He further states that the city lay in the lower reaches of the modern-day Man River (蛮河) basin to the west of the Han River so that today, the ruins of the Chuhuangcheng (楚皇城) lie here. (Note: Indicating the ruins to the west of Yicheng City, Hubei)

Historian Zhang Zhengming argues that King Wen established Ying and that it was located within the boundaries of Yicheng City, Hubei. In 506 BCE the State of Wu invaded Chu and destroyed Ying, and King Zhao of Chu fled only to return to the city without an armistice being declared. After a further attack by Wu in 504 CE the king moved the capital to Ruo. This lay in the eponymous former State of Ruo on the borders of Qin which had been previously annexed by Chu and that the residents continued to call Ying. (Note: Rou was located south of Yicheng City) Some years later, King Zhao moved the capital to Jiangling, Hubei which was also known as Jinan (紀南) or Jinancheng (紀南城).

Between the reigns of King Xuan of Chu (reigned 369–340 BCE) and King Qingxiang of Chu (reigned 298–263 BCE), Chu had a further temporary capital that was also called Ying. Ying occupied a strategic location with Yunmeng to the East, Ewuba (扼巫巴) to the west, access to the Central China Plain to the north and the natural defenses of the Yangtze River protecting its southern approaches.

== Legacy ==
Although King Wu of Chu's power base was shaken by the State of Han when they attacked the hinterland around the Jiangyan Plain, King Wen's relocation of the capital to Ying allowed him to continue with his father's military strategy.

Before King Wen moved the capital, he already had control of the Jiangyan Plain and afterwards dispatched his armies northwards as part of his plan to take control of China. At this time, he also held sway over the eastern approach to the State of Han and subsequently attacked the north of the state, giving him control of the Central China Plain.

In 688 BCE, King Wen wiped out the States of Shen and Deng, whereupon his power base became the former Shen capital at Nanyang, Henan.

== See also ==
- Lament for Ying, a poem
