= Huang (state) =

Ancient Chinese vassal state

Huang 黄國
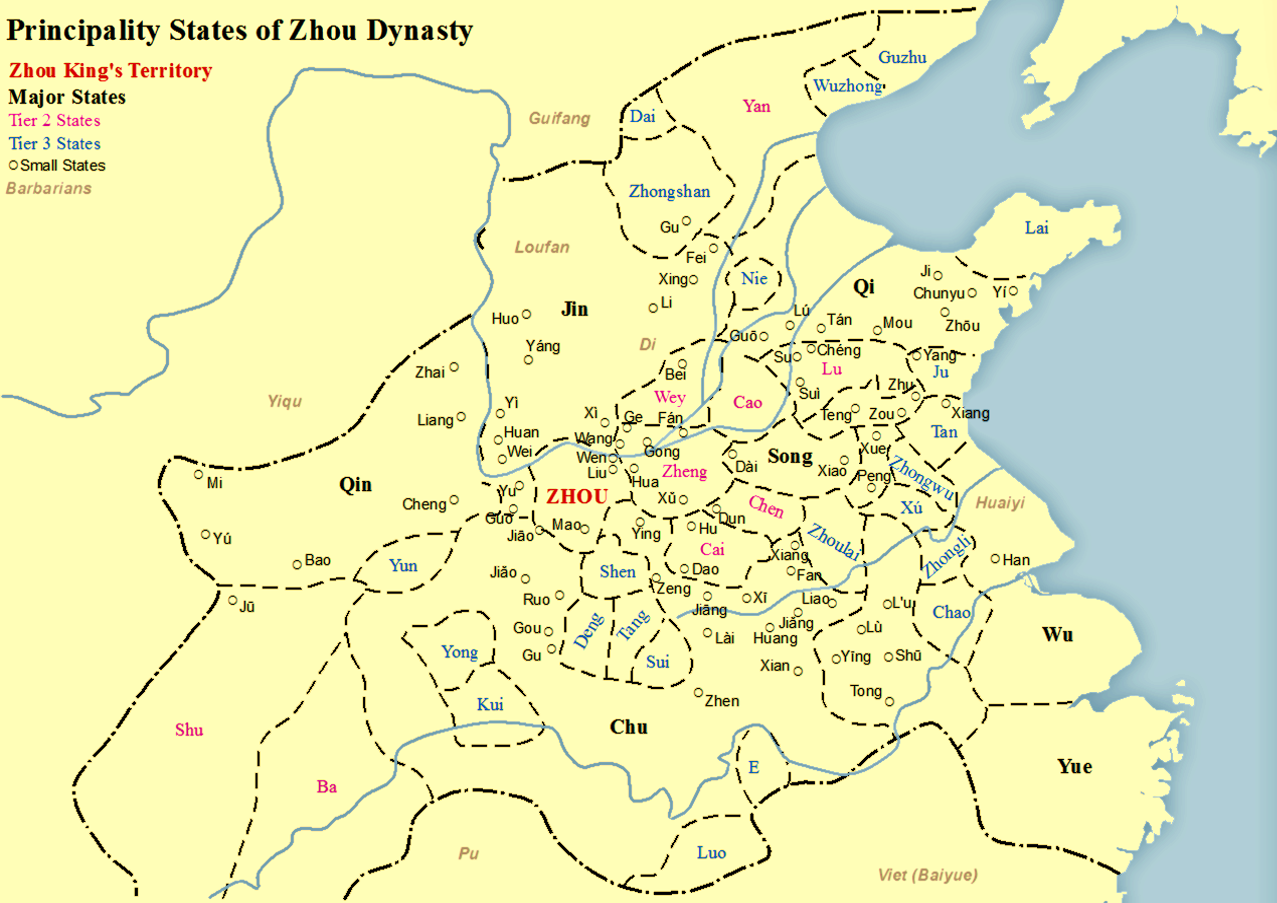
- A map of states during the Spring and Autumn period. Huang is depicted within Chu, east of Sui.
- Capital: Huangchuan
- Government: Monarchy
- Today part of: China

Huang was an ancient Chinese state that existed during the Spring and Autumn period. Their ruling family's surname may have been either Ying or Mi.

== History ==
The Bamboo Annals record that King Xiang of Xia launched an expedition against the "Huangyi" (黃夷) in the third year of his reign.

In 704 BCE, the states of Huang and Sui didn't attend a meeting called upon by Chu. Chu reprimanded Huang and attacked Sui.

In 675 BCE, the King of Chu attacked Huang at Jiling (踖陵) and defeated them.

In 658 BCE, the rulers of the states of Jiang and Huang made a covenant with the states of Song and Qi. This was probably an attempt by the latter to push Jiang and Huang away from the influence of Chu.

In 656 BCE, Jiang, Huang, and Lu jointly attacked Chen on Qi's behalf.

In 648 BCE, the ruler of Huang refused to pay tribute to Chu, saying "It is 900 li from Ying to our domain. How can they harm us?" Chu then invaded and extinguished Huang.

Beginning in 1975, multiple artifacts have been unearthed in Huangchuan relating to the state of Huang. One such artifact, a ding, provides evidence for a ruler (君) of Huang, named Meng (孟). Another ding is dedicated to the wife of a "Huangzi" (黄子), the former of which had the surname Ji (姬). Huangzi's wife was likely from a neighboring Ji-surnamed state such as Jiang, Xi, or Cai, though this is uncertain. Huangzi is thought to be the same person as Meng.

== Notable people ==
The Chu minister Huang Xie was speculated to have been descended from the state of Huang, although modern historians believe he was instead related to the Chu royal family.
