= Ruo =

Ruo or RUO may refer to:

- Ruo (state), a small vassal state during the Chinese Zhou Dynasty
- Istro-Romanian language, spoken in Croatia (ISO 639 code = ruo)
- Huang Ruo, a Chinese-born American composer
- Ruo River, a tributary of the Shire River in Malawi and Mozambique
- Ruo Shui, a large river of northern China
- Emoh Ruo, a 1985 Australian comedy film
- Ruo, Federated States of Micronesia, a village and municipality in the state of Chuuk
- RUO, an abbreviation for "Research Use Only": designation for diagnostic products or reagents by the FDA
