= Chu (state) =

Chinese Zhou dynasty state (c.1030 BC – 223 BC)

Chu 楚 *s-r̥aʔ
- c. 1030 BC – 223 BC
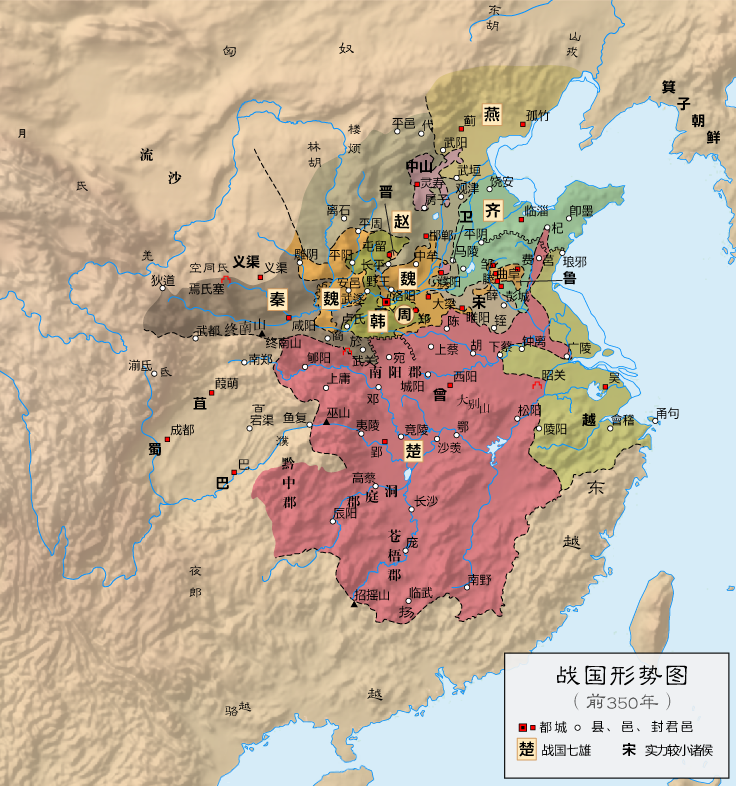
- Chu (楚) c. 350 BC
- Status: Viscounty (before 704 BC); Kingdom (704–223 BC)
- Capital: Danyang (丹陽)(c. 1030 – c. 680 BC); Ying (郢) (c. 680 – 278 BC); Chen (陳) (278–241 BC); Shouchun (壽春) (241–224 BC); Pengcheng
- Religion: Chinese folk religion; Ancestor veneration
- Government: Monarchy
- Historical era: Zhou dynasty
  - Founded by Xiong Yi: c. 1030 BC
  - Xiong Tong proclaimed king: 706 or 703 BC
  - Conquered by Qin: 223 BC
- Currency: Ancient Chinese coinage
Succeeded by
Qin dynasty

Chu
- "Chu" in seal script (top) and regular (bottom) Chinese characters
- Chinese: 楚
Transcriptions
Standard Mandarin
- Hanyu Pinyin: Chǔ
- Bopomofo: ㄔㄨˇ
- Wade–Giles: Ch'u^{3}
- Tongyong Pinyin: Chǔ
- IPA: [ʈʂʰù]
Wu
- Suzhounese: Tshou3
Yue: Cantonese
- Yale Romanization: Chó
- Jyutping: Co^{2}
- IPA: [tsʰɔ˧˥]
Southern Min
- Hokkien POJ: Chhó͘
- Tâi-lô: Tshóo
Middle Chinese
- Middle Chinese: tʂʰjó
Old Chinese
- Baxter (1992): *tsrhjaʔ
- Baxter–Sagart (2014): *s-r̥aʔ

Chu (Chinese: 楚; pinyin: Chǔ; Wade–Giles: Ch'u, Old Chinese: *s-r̥aʔ) was an ancient Chinese state during the Zhou dynasty. Their first ruler was King Wu of Chu in the early 8th century BC. Chu was located in the south of the Zhou heartland and lasted during the Spring and Autumn period. At the end of the Warring States period it was annexed by the Qin in 223 BC during the Qin's wars of unification.

Also known as Jing (荊) and Jingchu (荊楚), Chu included most of the present-day provinces of Hubei and Hunan, along with parts of Chongqing, Guizhou, Henan, Anhui, Jiangxi, Jiangsu, Zhejiang, and Shanghai. For more than 400 years, the Chu capital Danyang was located at the junction of the Dan and Xi Rivers near present-day Xichuan County, Henan, but later moved to Ying. The house of Chu originally bore the ancestral temple surname Nai (嬭 OC: /*rneːlʔ/) which was later written as Mi (芈 OC: /*meʔ/). They also bore the lineage name Yan (酓 OC: /*qlamʔ/, /*qʰɯːm/) which would later be written Xiong (熊 OC: /*ɢʷlɯm/).

== History ==
=== Founding ===
According to legends recounted in Sima Qian's Records of the Grand Historian, the ruling family of Chu descended from the Yellow Emperor and his grandson and successor Zhuanxu. Zhuanxu's great-grandson Wuhui (吳回) was put in charge of fire by Emperor Ku and given the title Zhurong. Wuhui's son Luzhong (陸終) had six sons, all born by Caesarian section. The youngest, Jilian, adopted the ancestral surname Mi. Jilian's descendant Yuxiong was the teacher of King Wen of Zhou (r. 1099–1050 BC). After the Zhou overthrew the Shang dynasty, King Cheng (r. 1042–1021 BC) enfeoffed Yuxiong's great-grandson Xiong Yi with the fiefdom of Chu in the Nanyang Basin and the hereditary title of zǐ (子; "viscount"). Then the first capital of Chu was established at Danyang (present-day Xichuan in Henan).

Sinologist Yuri Pines wrote that Chu originated as a normative Zhou polity that gradually developed cultural assertiveness in tandem with the increase in its political power, rather than being a "barbarian entity" drawn to the glory of the Zhou culture as suggested in the Mencius, and that divergent cultural patterns associated with Chu only emerged during the Spring and Autumn period.

=== Western Zhou ===
In 977 BC, during his campaign against Chu, King Zhao of Zhou's boat sank and he drowned in the Han River. After this death, Zhou ceased to expand to the south, allowing the southern tribes and Chu to cement their own autonomy much earlier than the states to the north. The Chu viscount Xiong Qu overthrew E in 863 BC but subsequently made its capital Ezhou one of his capitals. In either 703 or 706, the ruler Xiong Tong became the ruler of Chu.

=== Spring and Autumn period ===
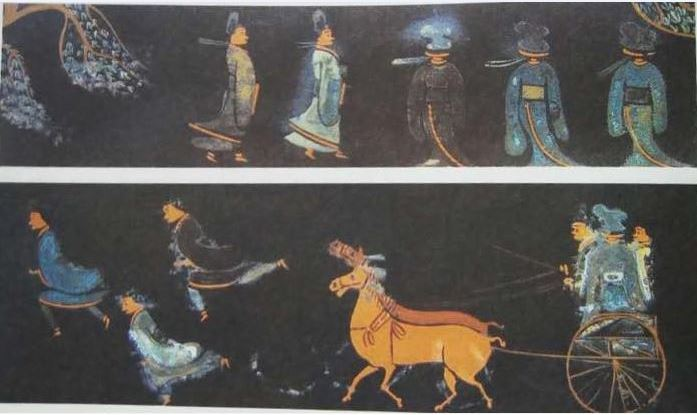
A lacquerware painting from the Jingmen Tomb Chinese: 荊門楚墓; pinyin: Jīngmén chǔ mù, about 316 BC) of the State of Chu, depicting men wearing precursors to Hanfu (i.e. traditional silk dress) and riding in a two-horsed chariot

Under the reign of King Zhuang, Chu reached the height of its power and its ruler was considered one of the five Hegemons of the era. After a number of battles with neighboring states, sometime between 695 and 689 BC, the Chu capital moved south-east from Danyang to Ying. Chu first consolidated its power by absorbing other states in its original area (modern Hubei), then it expanded into the north towards the North China Plain. In the summer of 648 BC, the State of Huang was annexed by the state of Chu.

The threat from Chu resulted in multiple northern alliances under the leadership of Jin. These alliances kept Chu in check, and the Chu kingdom lost their first major battle at the Chengpu in 632 BC. During the 6th century BC, Jin and Chu fought numerous battles over the hegemony of central plain. In 597 BC, Jin was defeated by Chu in the battle of Bi, causing Jin's temporary inability to counter Chu's expansion. Chu strategically used the state of Zheng as its representative in the central plain area, through the means of intimidation and threats, Chu forced Zheng to ally with itself. On the other hand, Jin had to balance out Chu's influence by repeatedly allying with Lu, Wey, and Song. The tension between Chu and Jin did not loosen until the year of 579 BC when a truce was signed between the two states.

At the beginning of the sixth century BC, Jin strengthened the state of Wu near the Yangtze delta to act as a counterweight against Chu. Wu defeated Qi and then invaded Chu in 506 BC. Following the Battle of Boju, it occupied Chu's capital at Ying, forcing King Zhao to flee to his allies in Yun and "Sui". King Zhao eventually returned to Ying but, after another attack from Wu in 504 BC, he temporarily moved the capital into the territory of the former state of Ruo. Chu began to strengthen Yue in modern Zhejiang to serve as allies against Wu. Yue was initially subjugated by King Fuchai of Wu until he released their king Goujian, who took revenge for his former captivity by crushing and completely annexing Wu.

=== Warring States period ===
Freed from its difficulties with Wu, Chu annexed Chen in 479 BC and overran Cai to the north in 447 BC. By the end of the 5th century BC, the Chu government had become very corrupt and inefficient, with much of the state's treasury used primarily to pay for the royal entourage. Many officials had no meaningful task except taking money and Chu's army, while large, was of low quality.

In the late 390s BC, King Dao of Chu made Wu Qi his chancellor. Wu's reforms began to transform Chu into an efficient and powerful state in 389 BC, as he lowered the salaries of officials and removed useless officials. He also enacted building codes to make the capital Ying seem less barbaric. Despite Wu Qi's unpopularity among Chu's ruling class, his reforms strengthened the king and left the state very powerful until the late 4th century BC, when Zhao and Qin were ascendant. Chu's powerful army once again became successful, defeating the states of Wei and Yue. Yue was partitioned between Chu and Qi in either 334 or 333 BC. However, the officials of Chu wasted no time in their revenge and Wu Qi was assassinated at King Dao's funeral in 381 BC. Prior to Wu's service in the state of Chu, Wu lived in the state of Wei, where his military analysis of the six opposing states was recorded in his magnum opus, The Book of Master Wu. Of Chu, he said:

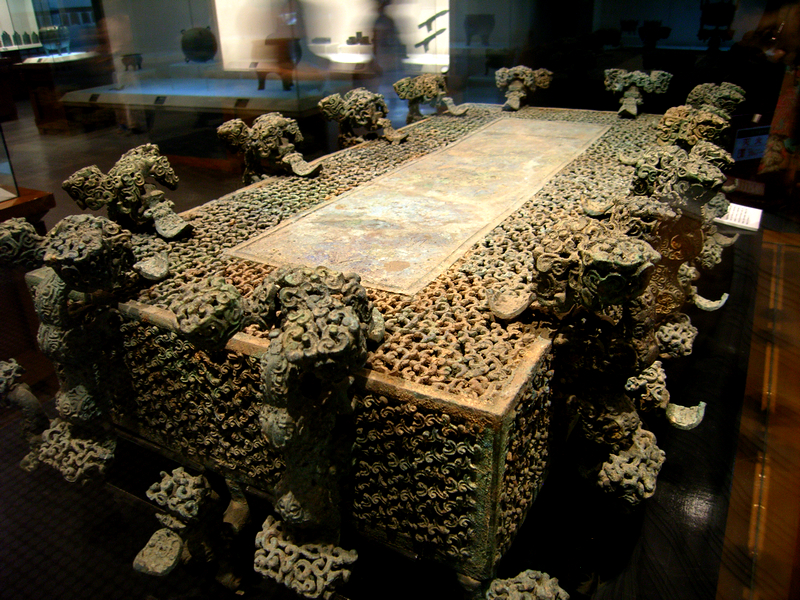
Bronze from the Tomb of Chu in Xichuan County.

The Chu people are soft and weak. Their lands stretch far and wide, and the government cannot effectively administer the expanse. Their troops are weary and although their formations are well-ordered, they do not have the resources to maintain their positions for long. To defeat them, we must strike swiftly, unexpectedly and retreat quickly before they can counter-attack. This will create unease in their weary soldiers and reduce their fighting spirit. Thus, with persistence, their army can be defeated.

— Wu Qi, Wuzi

During the late Warring States period, Chu was increasingly pressured by Qin to its west, especially after Qin enacted and preserved the Legalistic reforms of Shang Yang. In 241 BC, five of the seven major warring states–Chu, Zhao, Wei, Yan and Han–formed an alliance to fight the rising power of Qin. King Kaolie of Chu was named the leader of the alliance and Lord Chunshen the military commander. According to historian Yang Kuan, the Zhao general Pang Nuan (庞煖) was the actual commander in the battle. The allies attacked Qin at the strategic Hangu Pass but were defeated. King Kaolie blamed Lord Chunshen for the loss and began to mistrust him. Afterwards, Chu moved its capital east to Shouchun, farther away from the threat of Qin.

As Qin expanded into Chu's territory, Chu was forced to expand southwards and eastwards, absorbing local cultural influences along the way. Lu was conquered by King Kaolie in 249 BC. By the late 4th century BC, however, Chu's prominent status had fallen into decay. As a result of several invasions headed by Zhao and Qin, Chu was eventually completely wiped out by Qin.

=== Defeat ===
The Chu state was completely eradicated by the Qin dynasty.

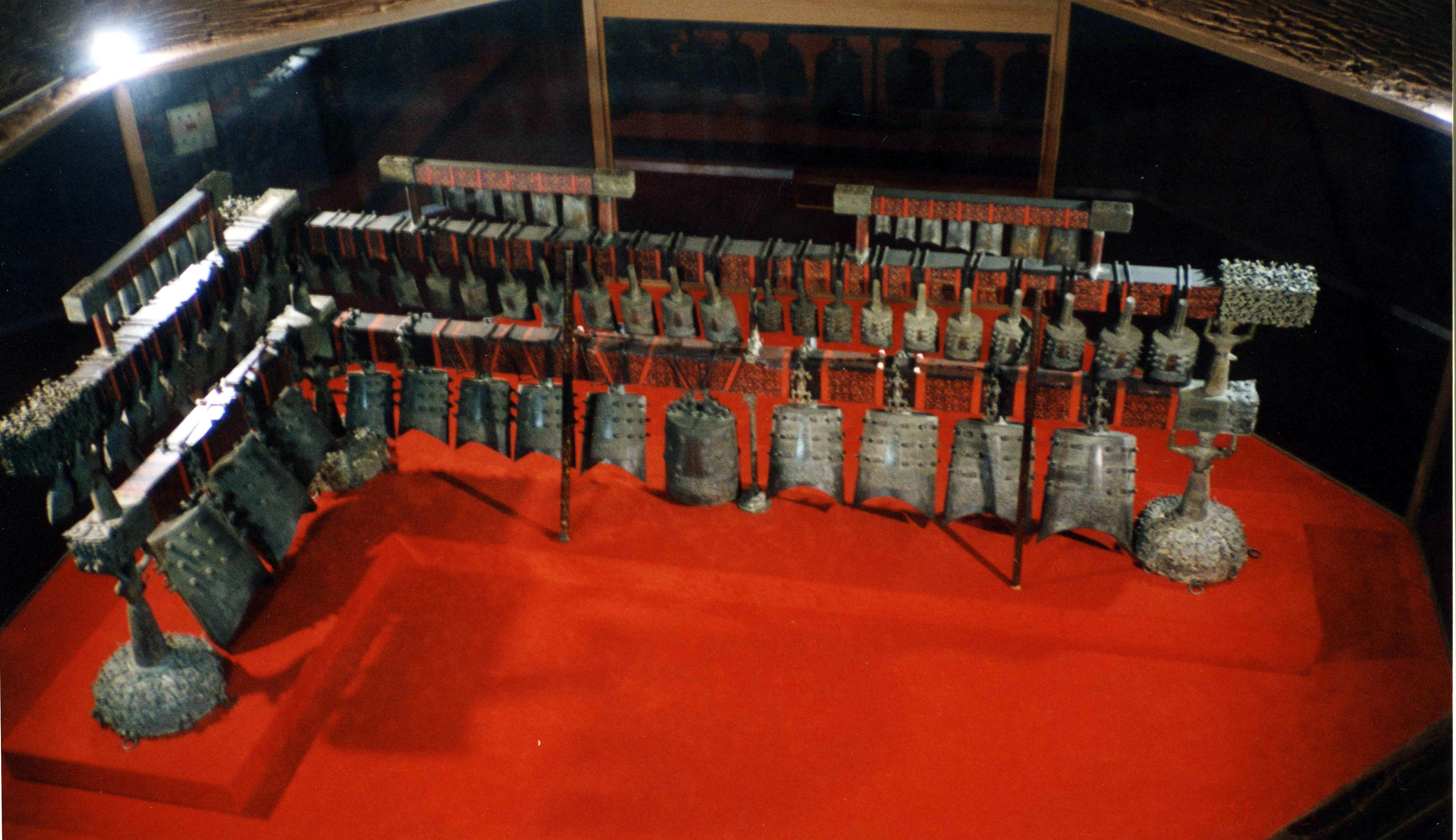
Bronze bells from the Tomb of Marquis Yi of Zeng, dated 433 BC, State of Chu.

According to the Records of the Warring States, a debate between the Diplomat strategist Zhang Yi and the Qin general Sima Cuo led to two conclusions concerning the unification of China. Zhang Yi argued in favor of conquering Han and seizing the Mandate of Heaven from the powerless Zhou king would be wise. Sima Cuo, however, considered that the primary difficulty was not legitimacy but the strength of Qin's opponents; he argued that "conquering Shu is conquering Chu" and, "once Chu is eliminated, the country will be united".

The importance of Shu in the Sichuan Basin was its great agricultural output and its control over the upper reaches of the Yangtze River, leading directly into the Chu heartland. King Huiwen of Qin opted to support Sima Cuo. In 316 BC, Qin invaded and conquered Shu and nearby Ba, expanding downriver in the following decades. In 278 BC, the Qin general Bai Qi finally conquered Chu's capital at Ying. Following the fall of Ying, the Chu government moved to various locations in the east until settling in Shouchun in 241 BC. After a massive two-year struggle, Bai Qi lured the main Zhao force of 400,000 men onto the field, surrounding them and forcing their surrender at Changping in 260 BC. The Qin army massacred their prisoners, removing the last major obstacle to Qin dominance over the Chinese states.

By 225 BC, only four kingdoms remained: Qin, Chu, Yan, and Qi. Chu had recovered sufficiently to mount serious resistance. Despite its size, resources, and manpower, though, Chu's corrupt government worked against it. In 224 BC, Zhao Zheng called for a meeting with his subjects to discuss his plans for the invasion of Chu. Wang Jian said that the invasion force needed to be at least 600,000 strong, while Li Xin thought that less than 200,000 men would be sufficient. Ying Zheng ordered Li Xin and Meng Wu to lead the army against Chu.

The Chu army, led by Xiang Yan, secretly followed Li Xin's army for three days and three nights, before launching a surprise offensive and destroying Li Xin army. Upon learning of Li's defeat, Ying Zheng replaced Li with Wang Jian, putting Wang in command of the 600,000-strong army he had requested earlier and placing Meng Wu beneath him as a deputy. Worried that the Qin tyrant might fear the power he now possessed and order him executed upon some pretense, Wang Jian constantly sent messengers back to the king in order to remain in contact and reduce the king's suspicion.

Wang Jian's army passed through southern Chen (陳; present-day Huaiyang in Henan) and made camp at Pingyu. The Chu armies under Xiang Yan used their full strength against the camp but failed. Wang Jian ordered his troops to defend their positions firmly but avoid advancing further into Chu territory. After failing to lure the Qin army into an attack, Xiang Yan ordered a retreat; Wang Jian seized this opportunity to launch a swift assault. The Qin forces pursued the retreating Chu forces to Qinan (蕲南; northwest of present-day Qichun in Hubei) and Xiang Yan was either killed in the action or committed suicide following his defeat.

The next year, in 223 BC, Qin launched another campaign and captured the Chu capital Shouchun. King Fuchu was captured and his state annexed. The following year, Wang Jian and Meng Wu led the Qin army against Wuyue around the mouth of the Yangtze, capturing the descendants of the royal family of Yue. These conquered territories became the Kuaiji Prefecture of the Qin Empire.

At their peak, Chu and Qin together fielded over 1,000,000 troops, more than the massive Battle of Changping between Qin and Zhao 35 years before. The excavated personal letters of two regular Qin soldiers, Hei Fu (黑夫) and Jing (惊), tell of a protracted campaign in Huaiyang under Wang Jian. Both soldiers wrote letters requesting supplies of clothing and money from home to sustain the long waiting campaign.

=== Qin and Han dynasties ===
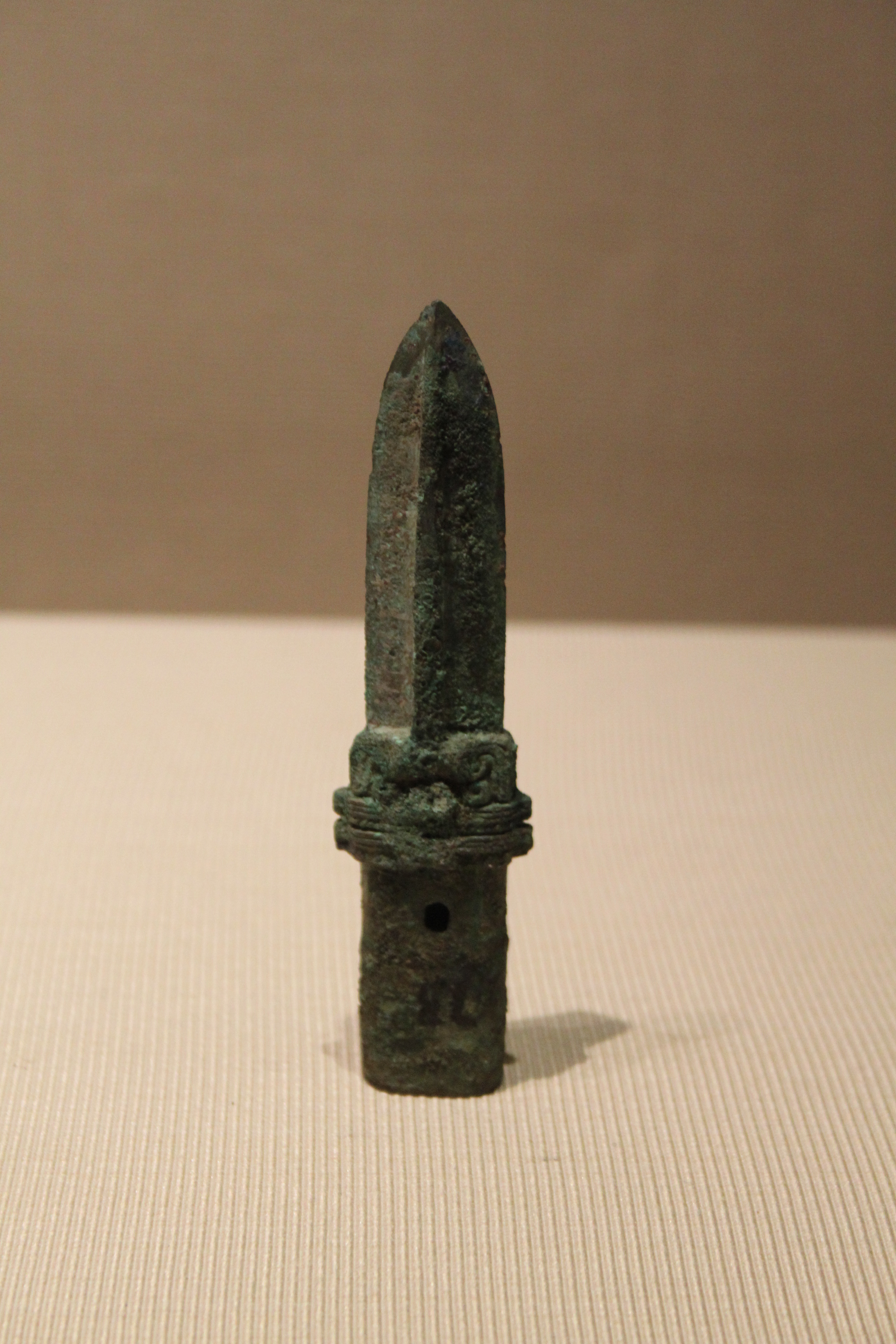
Spearhead from the state of Chu

The Chu populace in areas conquered by Qin openly ignored the stringent Qin laws and governance, as recorded in the excavated bamboo slips of a Qin administrator in Hubei. Chu aspired to overthrow the painful yoke of Qin rule and re-establish a separate state. The attitude was captured in a Chinese expression about implacable hostility: "Though Chu has but three clans, Qin shall fall by Chu's hand" (楚雖三戶, 亡秦必楚).

After Ying Zheng declared himself the First Emperor (Shi Huangdi) and reigned briefly, the people of Chu and its former ruling house organized the first violent insurrections against the new Qin administration. They were especially resentful of the Qin corvée; folk poems record the mournful sadness of Chu families whose men worked in the frigid north to construct the Great Wall of China.

The Dazexiang Uprising occurred in 209 BC under the leadership of a Chu peasant, Chen Sheng, who proclaimed himself "King of Rising Chu" (Zhangchu). This uprising was crushed by the Qin army but it inspired a new wave of other rebellions. One of the leaders, Jing Ju of Chu, proclaimed himself the new king of Chu. Jing Ju was defeated by another rebel force under Xiang Liang. Xiang installed Xiong Xin, a scion of Chu's traditional royal family, on the throne of Chu under the regnal name King Huai II. In 206 BC, after the fall of the Qin Empire, Xiang Yu, Xiang Liang's nephew, proclaimed himself the "Hegemon-King of Western Chu" and promoted King Huai II to "Emperor Yi". He subsequently had Yi assassinated. Xiang Yu then engaged with Liu Bang, another prominent anti-Qin rebel, in a long struggle for supremacy over the lands of the former Qin Empire, which became known as the Chu–Han Contention. The conflict ended in victory for Liu Bang: he proclaimed the Han dynasty and was later honored with the temple name Gaozu, while Xiang Yu committed suicide in defeat.

Liu Bang immediately enacted a more traditional and less intrusive administration than the Qin before him, made peace with the Xiongnu through heqin intermarriages, rewarded his allies with large fiefdoms, and allowed the population to rest from centuries of warfare. The core Chu territories centered in Pengcheng was granted first to general Han Xin and then to Liu Bang's brother Liu Jiao as the Kingdom of Chu. By the time of Emperor Wu of Han, the southern folk culture and aesthetics were mixed with the Han-sponsored Confucian tradition and Qin-influenced central governance to create a distinct "Chinese" culture.

== Culture ==
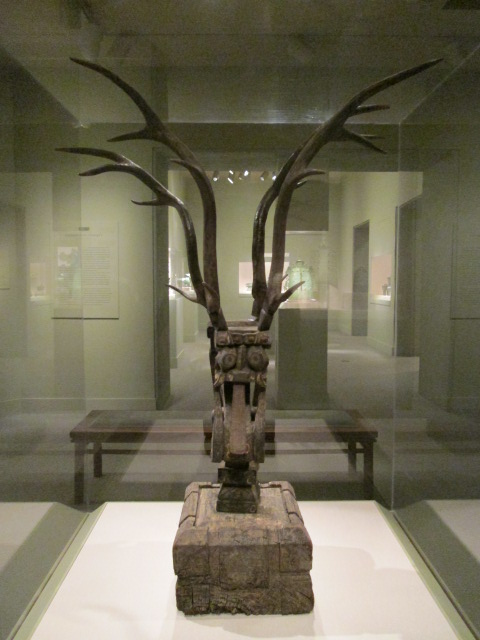
Tomb guardian.

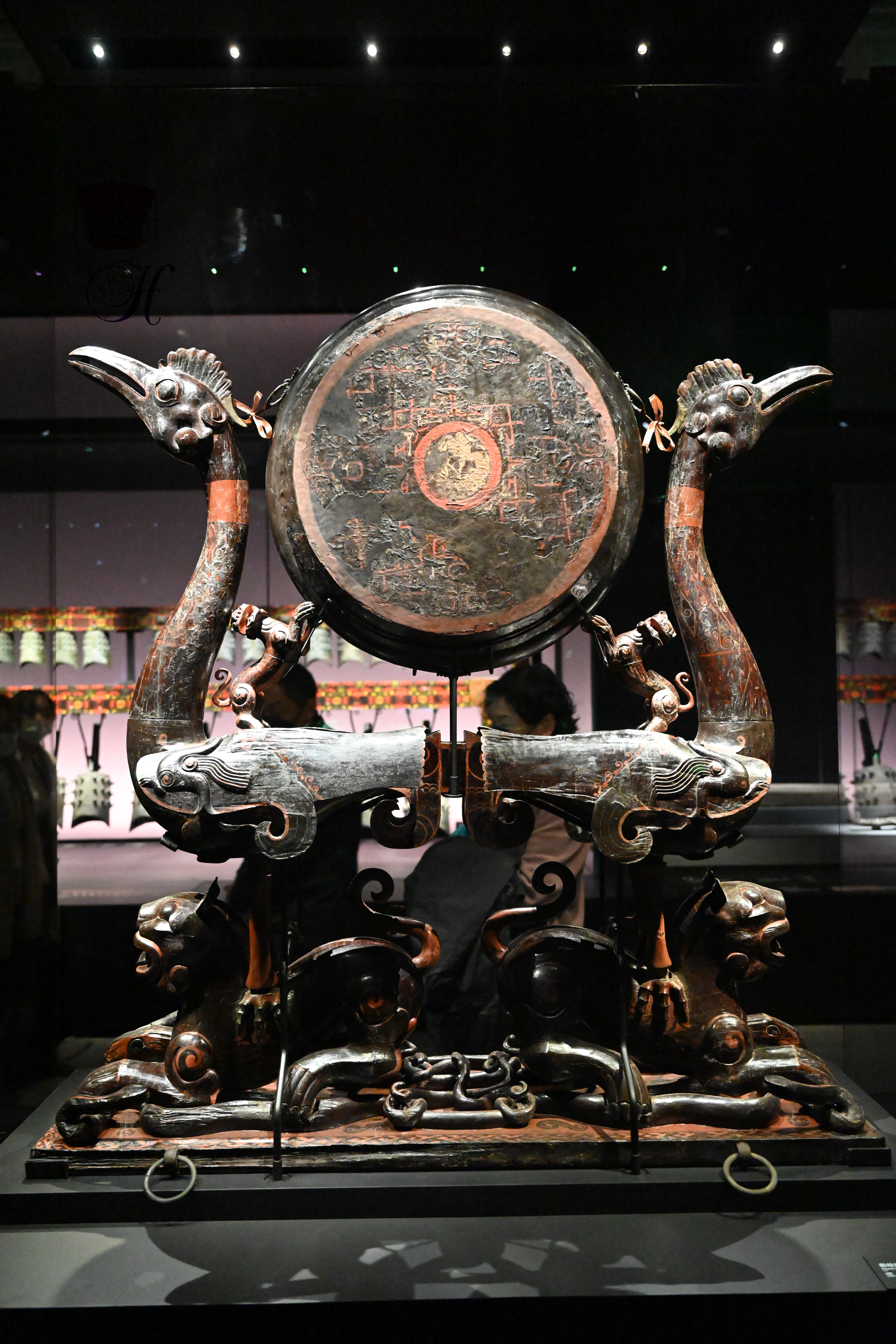
Drum with and Bird and Tiger Frame, Chu-state, Spring and Autumn period.

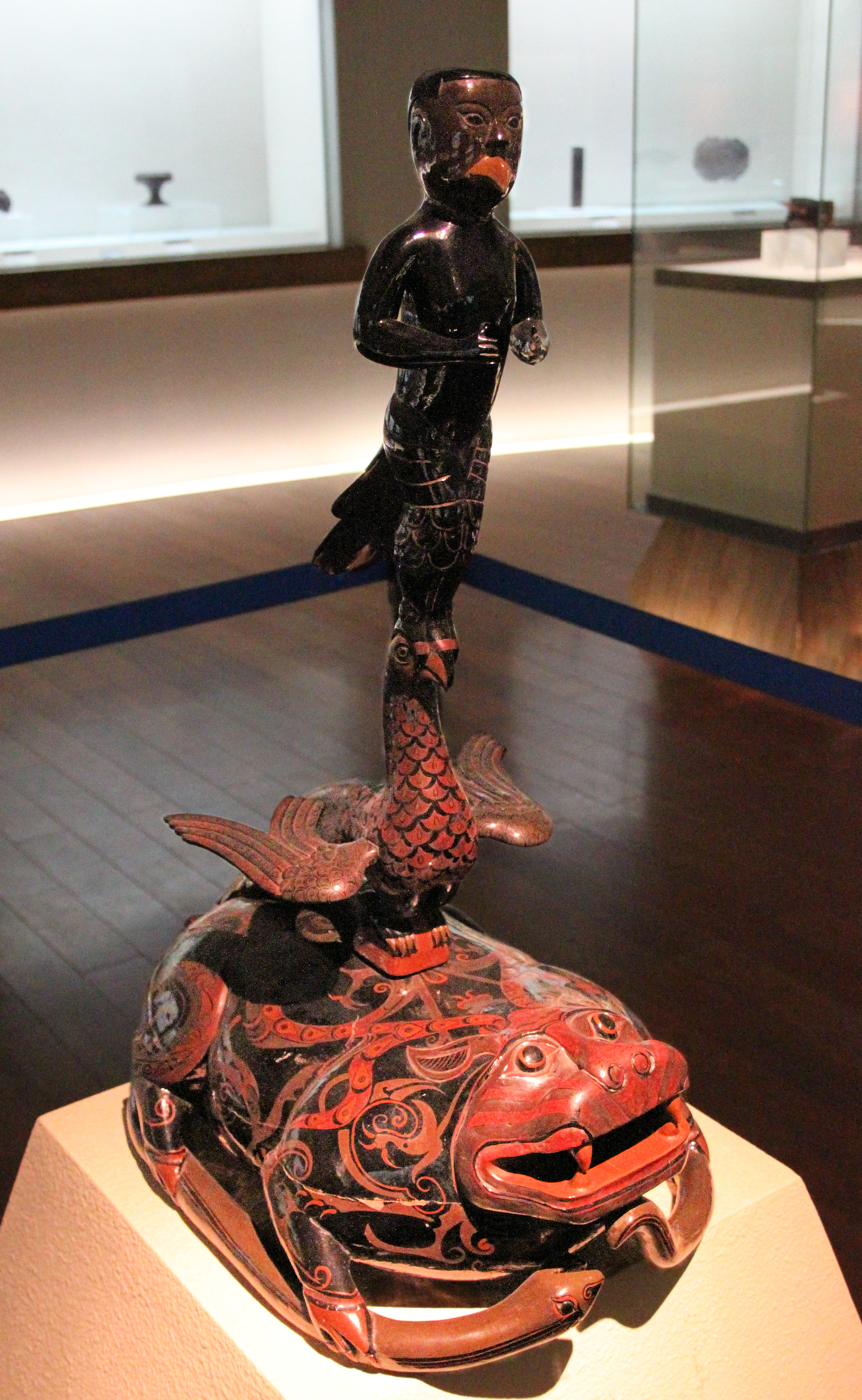
Lacquered yuren (羽人) figure on a toad stand

Based on the archaeological finds, Chu's culture was initially quite similar to that of the other Zhou states of the Yellow River basin. However, subsequently, Chu absorbed indigenous elements from the Baiyue lands that it conquered to the south and east, developing a blended culture compared to the northern plains.

During the Western Zhou period, the difference between the culture of Chu and the Central Plains states to the north was negligible. Only in the late Spring and Autumn period does Chu culture begin to diverge, preserving some older aspects of the culture and developing new phenomena. It also absorbed some elements from annexed areas. The culture of Chu had significant internal diversity from locality to locality. Chu, like Qin and Yan, was often described by people in the Central plains as being not as cultured. However, this image originated with the later development of Chu relative to the Central plains, and the stereotype was retrospectively cultivated by Confucian scholars in the Qin dynasty, to indirectly criticise the ruling regime, and the Han dynasty as a means of curbing their ideological opponents who were associated with such cultural practices. As the founder of the Han dynasty was from the state, Chu culture would later become a basis of the culture of the later Han dynasty, along with that of the Qin dynasty's and other preceding states' from the Warring States period.

Early Chu burial offerings consisted primarily of bronze vessels in the Zhou style. The bronze wares of the state of Chu also have their own characteristics. For example, the bronze Jin (altar table) unearthed from the Chu tomb in Xichuan, Henan Province are complex in shape. Dated to the mid sixth century BC, it was one of the early confirmed lost-wax cast artifacts discovered in China proper. Later Chu burials, especially during the Warring States, featured distinct burial objects, such as colorful lacquerware, iron, and silk, accompanied by a reduction in bronze vessel offerings. A common Chu motif was the vivid depiction of wildlife, mystical animals, and natural imagery, such as snakes, dragons, phoenixes, tigers, and free-flowing clouds and serpent-like beings. Some archaeologists speculate that Chu may have had cultural connections to the previous Shang dynasty, since many motifs used by Chu appeared earlier at Shang sites such as serpent-tailed gods.

Another common Chu idea was the worship of gibbons and other animals perceived to have auspicious amounts of qi.

Later Chu culture was known for its affinity for shamans. The Chu culture and government supported Taoism and native shamanism supplemented with some Confucian glosses on Zhou ritual. Chu people affiliated themselves with the god of fire Zhurong in Chinese mythology. For this reason, fire worshiping and red coloring were practiced by Chu people.

The naturalistic and flowing art, the Songs of Chu, historical records, excavated bamboo documents such as the Guodian slips, and other artifacts reveal heavy Taoist and native folk influence in Chu culture. The disposition to a spiritual, often pleasurable and decadent lifestyle, and the confidence in the size of the Chu realm led to the inefficiency and eventual destruction of the Chu state by the ruthless Legalist state of Qin. Even though the Qin realm lacked the vast natural resources and waterways of Chu, the Qin government maximized its output under the efficient minister Shang Yang, installing a meritocracy focused solely on agricultural and military might.

Archaeological evidence shows that Chu music was annotated differently from Zhou. Chu music also showed an inclination for using different performance ensembles, as well as unique instruments. In Chu, the se was preferred over the zither, while both instruments were equally preferred in the northern Zhou states.

Chu came into frequent contact with other peoples in the south, most notably the Ba, Yue, and the Baiyue. Numerous burials and burial objects in the Ba and Yue styles have been discovered throughout the territory of Chu, co-existing with Chu-style burials and burial objects.

Some archaeological records of the Chu appear at Mawangdui. After the Han dynasty, some Confucian scholars considered Chu culture with distaste, criticizing the "lewd" music and shamanistic rituals associated with Chu culture.

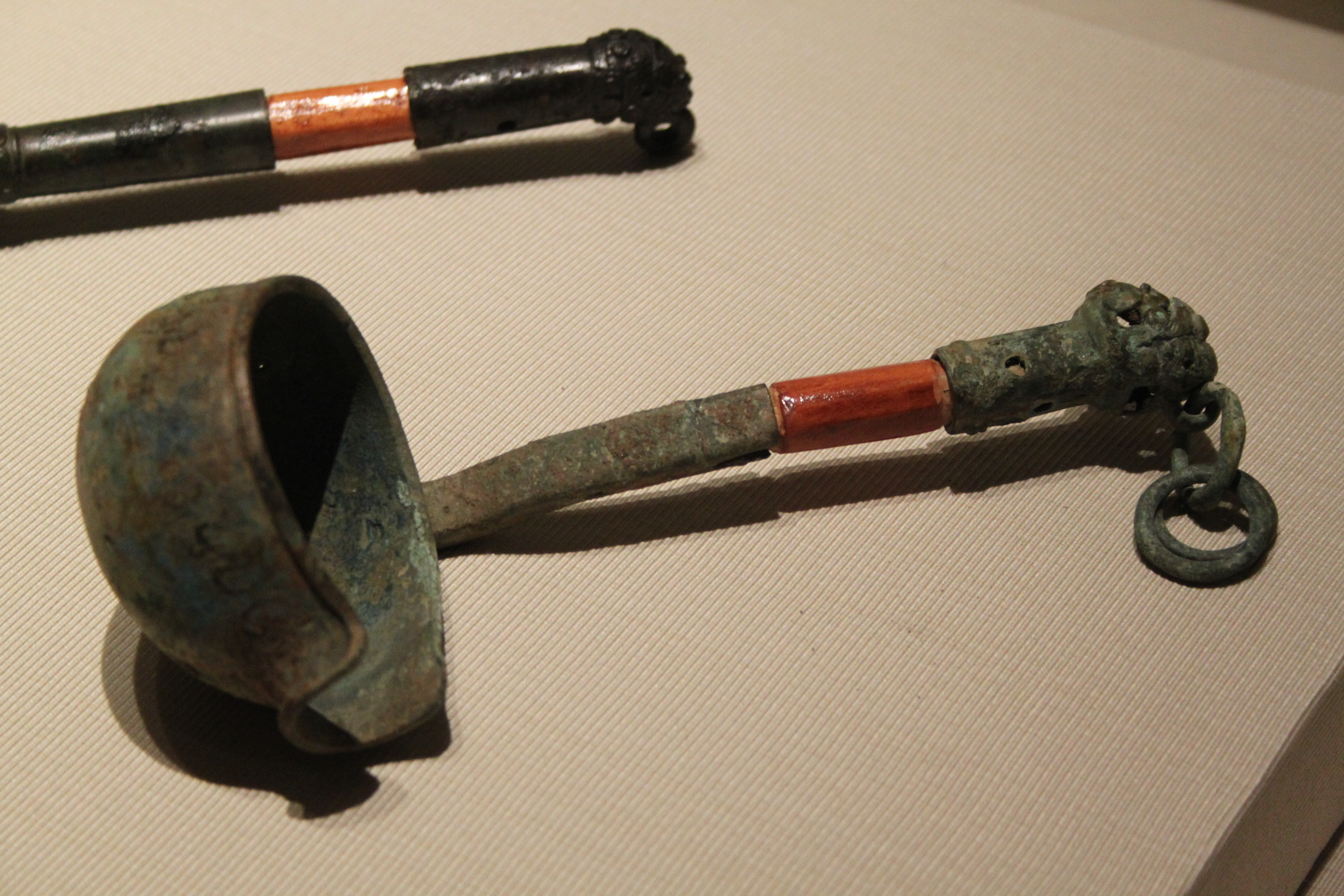
Bronze ladle from the state of Chu

Chu artisanship includes color, especially the lacquer woodworks. Red and black pigmented lacquer were most used. Silk-weaving also attained a high level of craftsmanship, creating lightweight robes with flowing designs. These examples (as at Mawangdui) were preserved in waterlogged tombs where the lacquer did not peel off over time and in tombs sealed with coal or white clay. Chu used the calligraphic script called "Birds and Worms" style, which was borrowed by the Wu and Yue states. It has a design that embellishes the characters with motifs of animals, snakes, birds, and insects. This is another representation of the natural world and its liveliness. Chu produced broad bronze swords that were similar to Wuyue swords but not as intricate.

Chu created a riverine transport system of boats augmented by wagons. These are detailed in bronze tallies with gold inlay regarding trade along the river systems connecting with those of the Chu capital at Ying.

== Linguistic influences ==
Although bronze inscriptions from the ancient state of Chu show little linguistic differences from the "Elegant Speech" (雅言; yǎyán) during the Eastern Zhou period, the variety of Old Chinese spoken in Chu has long been assumed to reflect lexical borrowings and syntactical interferences from non-Sinitic substrates, which the Chu may have acquired as a result of its southern migration into what Tian Jizhou believed to be a Kra–Dai or (para-) Hmong–Mien area in southern China. Recent excavated texts, corroborated by dialect words recorded in the Fangyan, further demonstrated substrate influences, but there are competing hypotheses on their genealogical affiliation.

- Aberrant early Chinese dialect, originally from the North
- Austroasiatic (Norman & Mei 1976, Boltz 1999)
- Hmong–Mien (Erkes 1930, Long & Ma 1983, Brooks 2001, Sagart et al. 2005)
- Kra–Dai (Liu Xingge 1988, Zhengzhang Shangfang 2005)
- Tibeto-Burman (Zhang Yongyan 1992, Zhou Jixu 2001)
- Mixture of Austroasiatic, Hmong-Mien and Tibeto-Burman (Pullyblank 1983, Schuessler 2004 & 2007)
- Unknown

Noticing that both 荆; Jīng and 楚; Chǔ refer to the thorny chaste tree (genus Vitex), Schuessler (2007) proposes two Austroasiatic comparanda:

- 楚 Chǔ < Old Chinese *tshraʔ is comparable to Proto-Monic *jrlaaʔ "thorn, thorny bamboo (added to names of thorny plants)", Khmu /cǝrlaʔ/, Semai /jǝrlaaʔ/, all descending from Proto-Austroasiatic *ɟrla(:)ʔ "thorn";
- 荆 Jīng < Old Chinese *kreŋ is comparable to Khmer ជ្រាំង crĕəng “to bristle” and ប្រែង praeng “bristle”, with Chinese initial *k- possibly being a noun-forming prefix.

== Bureaucracy ==
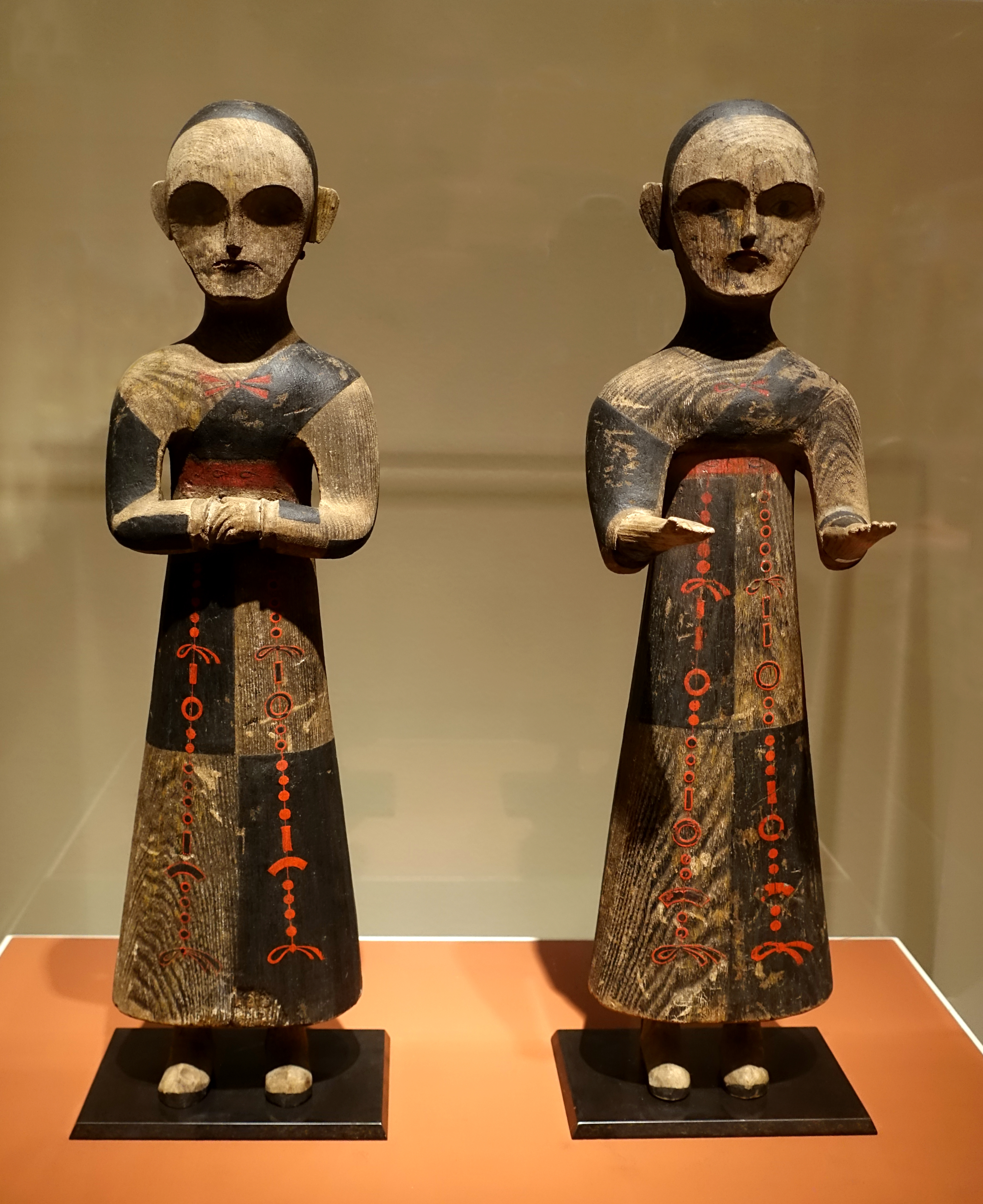
Pair of shamans or attendants, Chu culture, Jiangling, Hubei province, China, Warring States period, 4th-3rd century BC, wood, cinnabar, black lacquer. Portland Art Museum

The Mo'ao (莫敖) and the Lingyin (令尹) were the top government officials of Chu. Sima was the military commander of Chu's army. Lingyin, Mo'ao and Sima were the San Gong (三公) of Chu. In the Spring and Autumn period, Zuoyin (左尹) and Youyin (右尹) were added as the undersecretaries of Lingyin. Likewise, Sima (司馬) was assisted by Zuosima (左司馬) and Yousima (右司馬) respectively. Mo'ao's status was gradually lowered while Lingyin and Sima became more powerful posts in the Chu court.

Ministers whose functions vary according to their titles were called Yin (尹). For example: Lingyin (Prime minister), Gongyin (Minister of works), and Zhenyin were all suffixed by the word "Yin". Shenyin (沈尹) was the minister of religious duties or the high priest of Chu, multiple entries in Zuo Zhuan indicated their role as oracles. Other Yins recorded by history were: Yuyin, Lianyin, Jiaoyin, Gongjiyin, Lingyin, Huanlie Zhi Yin (Commander of Palace guards) and Yueyin (Minister of Music). In counties and commanderies, Gong (公), also known as Xianyin (minister of county) was the chief administrator.

In many cases, positions in Chu's bureaucracy were hereditarily held by members of a cadet branch of Chu's royal house of Mi. Mo'ao, one of the three chancellors of Chu, was exclusively chosen from Qu (屈) clan. During the early spring and autumn period and before the Ruo'ao rebellion, Lingyin was a position held by Ruo'aos, namely Dou (鬭) and Cheng (成).

The Chu state was unusual among the larger states in that it exhibited a high level of centralization from the early period. Chu lacked large lineage estates in the countryside that frequently became important power bases in other states. Chu also innovated the organization of newly-annexed states into counties (xian) overseen by centrally-controlled administrators. This high degree of early centralization is likely to have helped Chu in its early success at expansion.

== Geography ==
Progenitors of Chu such as viscount Xiong Yi were said to originate from the Jing Mountains; a chain of mountains located in today's Hubei province. Rulers of Chu systematically migrated states annexed by Chu to the Jing mountains in order to control them more efficiently. East of Jing mountains are the Tu (塗) mountains. In the north-east part of Chu are the Dabie mountains; the drainage divide of Huai river and Yangtse river. The first capital of Chu, Danyang (丹陽) was located in today's Zhijiang, Hubei province. Ying (郢), one of the later capitals of Chu, is known by its contemporary name Jingzhou. In Chu's northern border lies the Fangcheng mountain. Strategically, Fangcheng is an ideal defense against states of central plain. Due to its strategic value, numerous castles were built on the Fangcheng mountain.

Yunmeng Ze in Jianghan Plain was an immense freshwater lake that historically existed in Chu's realm, It was crossed by Yanzi river, the northern Yunmeng was named Meng (夢), the southern Yunmeng was known as Yun (雲). The lake's body covers parts of today's Zhijiang, Jianli, Shishou, Macheng, Huanggang, and Anlu.

Shaoxi Pass was an important outpost in the mountainous western border of Chu. It was located in today's Wuguan town of Danfeng County, Shaanxi. Any forces that marched from the west, mainly from Qin, to Chu's realm would have to pass Shaoxi.

== List of states annexed by Chu ==
- 863 BC E
- 704 BC Quan
- 690 BC Luo
- 688–680 BC Shen
- 684–680 BC Xi
- 678 BC Deng
- 648 BC Huang
- after 643 BC Dao
- 623 BC Jiang (江)
- 622 BC Liao
- 622 BC Lù (六).
- after 622 BC Ruo
- 617 BC Jiang (蔣)
- 611 BC Yong
- 601 BC Shuliao
- Sometime in the 6th century BC Zhongli
- after 506 BC Sui
- 574 BC Shuyong
- 538 BC Lai (賴國)
- 512 BC Xu
- 479 BC Chen
- 445 BC Qi
- 447 BC Cai
- 431 BC Ju
- after 418 BC Pi
- About 348 BC Zou
- 334 BC Yue
- 249 BC Lu

== Rulers ==
Early rulers (Note: See also, the Tsinghua Bamboo Slips.)

1. Jilian (季連), married Bi Zhui (妣隹), granddaughter of Shang dynasty king Pangeng; adopted Mi (芈) as ancestral name
2. Yingbo (𦀚伯) or Fuju (附沮), son of Jilian
3. Yuxiong (鬻熊), ruled 11th century BC: also called Xuexiong (穴熊), teacher of King Wen of Zhou
4. Xiong Li (熊麗), ruled 11th century BC: son of Yuxiong, first use of clan name Yan (酓), later written as Xiong (熊)
5. Xiong Kuang (熊狂), ruled 11th century BC: son of Xiong Li

Viscounts

1. Xiong Yi (熊繹), ruled 11th century BC: son of Xiong Kuang, enfeoffed by King Cheng of Zhou
2. Xiong Ai (熊艾), ruled c. 977 BC: son of Xiong Yi, defeated and killed King Zhao of Zhou
3. Xiong Dan (熊䵣), ruled c. 941 BC: son of Xiong Ai, defeated King Mu of Zhou
4. Xiong Sheng (熊勝), son of Xiong Dan
5. Xiong Yang (熊楊), younger brother of Xiong Sheng
6. Xiong Qu (熊渠), son of Xiong Yang, gave the title king to his three sons
7. Xiong Kang (熊康), son of Xiong Qu. Shiji says Xiong Kang died early without ascending the throne, but the Tsinghua Bamboo Slips recorded him as the successor of Xiong Qu.
8. Xiong Zhi (熊摯), son of Xiong Kang, abdicated due to illness
9. Xiong Yan (elder) (熊延), ruled ?–848 BC: younger brother of Xiong Zhi
10. Xiong Yong (熊勇), ruled 847–838 BC: son of Xiong Yan
11. Xiong Yan (younger) (熊嚴), ruled 837–828 BC: brother of Xiong Yong
12. Xiong Shuang (熊霜), ruled 827–822 BC: son of Xiong Yan
13. Xiong Xun (熊徇), ruled 821–800 BC: youngest brother of Xiong Shuang
14. Xiong E (熊咢), ruled 799–791 BC: son of Xiong Xun
15. Ruo'ao (若敖) (Xiong Yi 熊儀), ruled 790–764 BC: son of Xiong E
16. Xiao'ao (霄敖) (Xiong Kan 熊坎), ruled 763–758 BC: son of Ruo'ao
17. Fenmao (蚡冒) (Xiong Xuan 熊眴) ruled 757–741 BC: son of Xiao'ao

Kings

1. King Wu of Chu (楚武王) (Xiong Da 熊達), ruled 740–690 BC: either younger brother or younger son of Fenmao, murdered son of Fenmao and usurped the throne. Declared himself first king of Chu.
2. King Wen of Chu (楚文王) (Xiong Zi 熊貲), ruled 689–677 BC: son of King Wu, moved the capital to Ying
3. Du'ao (堵敖) or Zhuang'ao (莊敖) (Xiong Jian 熊艱), ruled 676–672 BC: son of King Wen, killed by younger brother, the future King Cheng
4. King Cheng of Chu (楚成王) (Xiong Yun 熊惲), ruled 671–626 BC: brother of Du'ao, defeated by the state of Jin at the Battle of Chengpu. Husband to Zheng Mao. He was murdered by his son, the future King Mu
5. King Mu of Chu (楚穆王) (Xiong Shangchen 熊商臣) ruled 625–614 BC: son of King Cheng
6. King Zhuang of Chu (楚莊王) (Xiong Lü 熊侶) ruled 613–591 BC: son of King Mu. Defeated the State of Jin at the Battle of Bi, and was recognized as a Hegemon.
7. King Gong of Chu (楚共王) (Xiong Shen 熊審) ruled 590–560 BC: son of King Zhuang. Defeated by Jin at the Battle of Yanling.
8. King Kang of Chu (楚康王) (Xiong Zhao 熊招) ruled 559–545 BC: son of King Gong
9. Jia'ao (郟敖) (Xiong Yuan 熊員) ruled 544–541 BC: son of King Kang, murdered by his uncle, the future King Ling.
10. King Ling of Chu (楚靈王) (Xiong Wei 熊圍, changed to Xiong Qian 熊虔) ruled 540–529 BC: uncle of Jia'ao and younger brother of King Kang, overthrown by his younger brothers and committed suicide.
11. Zi'ao (訾敖) (Xiong Bi 熊比) ruled 529 BC (less than 20 days): younger brother of King Ling, committed suicide.
12. King Ping of Chu (楚平王) (Xiong Qiji 熊弃疾, changed to Xiong Ju 熊居) ruled 528–516 BC: younger brother of Zi'ao, tricked Zi'ao into committing suicide.
13. King Zhao of Chu (楚昭王) (Xiong Zhen 熊珍) ruled 515–489 BC: son of King Ping. The State of Wu captured the capital Ying and he fled to the State of Sui.
14. King Hui of Chu (楚惠王) (Xiong Zhang 熊章) ruled 488–432 BC: son of King Zhao. He conquered the states of Cai and Chen. The year before he died, Marquis Yi of Zeng died, so he made a commemorative bell and attended the Marquis's funeral at Suizhou.
15. King Jian of Chu (楚簡王) (Xiong Zhong 熊中) ruled 431–408 BC: son of King Hui
16. King Sheng of Chu (楚聲王) (Xiong Dang 熊當) ruled 407–402 BC: son of King Jian
17. King Dao of Chu (楚悼王) (Xiong Yi 熊疑) ruled 401–381 BC: son of King Sheng. He made Wu Qi chancellor and reformed the Chu government and army.
18. King Su of Chu (楚肅王) (Xiong Zang 熊臧) ruled 380–370 BC: son of King Dao
19. King Xuan of Chu (楚宣王) (Xiong Liangfu 熊良夫) ruled 369–340 BC: brother of King Su. Defeated and annexed the Zuo state around 348 BC.
20. King Wei of Chu (楚威王) (Xiong Shang 熊商) ruled 339–329 BC: son of King Xuan. Defeated and partitioned the Yue state with Qi state.
21. King Huai of Chu (楚懷王) (Xiong Huai 熊槐) ruled 328–299 BC: son of King Wei, was tricked and held hostage by the State of Qin until death in 296 BC
22. King Qingxiang of Chu (楚頃襄王) (Xiong Heng 熊橫) ruled 298–263 BC: son of King Huai. As a prince, one of his elderly tutors was buried at the site of the Guodian Chu Slips in Hubei. The Chu capital of Ying was captured and sacked by Qin.
23. King Kaolie of Chu (楚考烈王) (Xiong Yuan 熊元) ruled 262–238 BC: son of King Qingxiang. Moved capital to Shouchun.
24. King You of Chu (楚幽王) (Xiong Han 熊悍) ruled 237–228 BC: son of King Kaolie.
25. King Ai of Chu (楚哀王) (Xiong You 熊猶 or Xiong Hao 熊郝) ruled 228 BC: brother of King You, killed by Fuchu
26. Fuchu (楚王負芻) (熊負芻 Xiong Fuchu) ruled 227–223 BC: brother of King Ai. Captured by Qin troops and deposed
27. Lord Changping (昌平君) ruled 223 BC (Chu conquered by Qin): brother of Fuchu, killed in battle against Qin

Others

- Chen Sheng (陳勝) as King Yin of Chu (楚隱王) ruled 210–209 BC
- Jing Ju (景駒) as King Jia of Chu 楚假王 ruled 209–208 BC
- Xiong Xin (熊心) as Emperor Yi of Chu (楚義帝) (originally King Huai II 楚後懷王) ruled 208–206 BC: grandson or great-grandson of King Huai
- Xiang Yu (項羽) as Hegemon-King of Western Chu (西楚霸王) ruled 206–202 BC

== People ==
- Qu Yuan, poet who committed suicide
- Lord Chunshen, one of the Four Lords of the Warring States
- Xiang Yu, the Hegemon-King of Western Chu who defeated the Qin at Julu and vied with Liu Bang in the Chu–Han Contention
- Liu Bang, later citizen of the Qin dynasty and then founder of the Han dynasty

== Astronomy ==
In traditional Chinese astronomy, Chu is represented by a star in the "Twelve States" asterism, part of the "Girl" lunar mansion in the "Black Turtle" symbol. Opinions differ, however, as to whether that star is Phi or 24 Capricorni. It is also represented by the star Epsilon Ophiuchi in the "Right Wall" asterism in the "Heavenly Market" enclosure.

== Biology ==
The virus taxa Chuviridae and Jingchuvirales are named after Chǔ.

== See also ==
- Prime Minister of Chu
- Chu Silk Manuscript
- Chu Kingdom (Han dynasty)
