= Deng (state) =

Ancient Chinese state (c. 1200–678 BCE)

Deng 鄧
- c. 1200 BCE–678 BCE
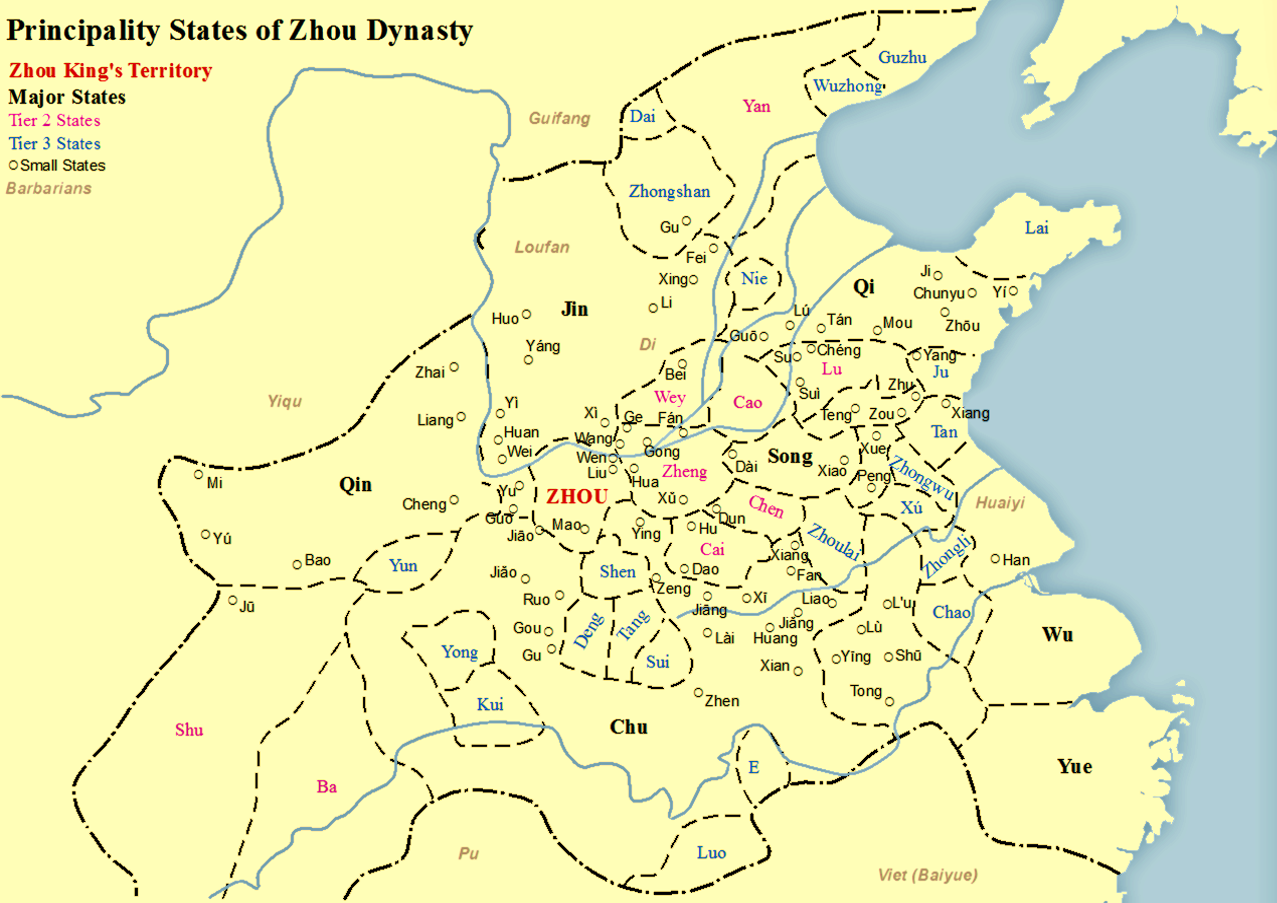
- Deng is in the central-south region near Chu
- Capital: Dengzhou (鄧州/邓州), Henan Province or Xiangfan (襄樊), Hubei Province
- Common languages: Old Chinese
- Government: Marquessate
- History
  - Established: c. 1200 BCE
  - Disestablished: 678 BCE
Succeeded by
Chu (state)

Deng (simplified Chinese: 邓; traditional Chinese: 鄧; pinyin: Dèng) was a Chinese vassal state during the Shang and Eastern Zhou dynasties ruled by the Man (曼) family.

== Territory ==
Sources conflict as to whether the State of Deng was situated in Dengzhou (鄧州/邓州), Henan Province or Xiangfan (襄樊), Hubei Province.

== History ==
Shang dynasty King Wu Ding (武丁) (reigned 1250–1192 BCE) conferred the lands of the State of Deng on his younger brother Zĭ Màn (子曼) who passed it down to later generations. During the reign of Wú Lí (吾离) Deng became rich and powerful for a time but its influence declined with the rise of the hegemonies during the Spring and Autumn period.

In 688 BCE, King Wén of Chǔ had to pass through the State of Deng in order to attack the State of Shēn. Even though Dèng was the birthplace of Dèng Màn (邓曼), one of the wives of King Wén's father King Wǔ of Chǔ (楚武王), the State of Deng lay on the borders of the State of Chu such that its overthrow would prove convenient for the expansion of Chu. Three vigilant chancellors of the State of Deng, Zhuīshēng (騅甥/骓甥), Dānshēng (聃甥) and Yǎngshēng (養甥/养甥) urged their lord to kill King Wén. The Marquess of Deng did not listen. King Wén of Chu passed through the State of Deng and attacked the State of Shen. On his return the King attacked Deng.

In 678 BCE King Wén of Chu conquered State of Deng. With the annexation of the States of Shen and Deng, the State of Chu extended its territory into the Nanyang Basin. Afterwards its people adopted the surname Deng (鄧/邓) which is still common today.
