= Nanyang Basin =

Basin in China

The Nanyang Basin (simplified Chinese: 南阳盆地; traditional Chinese: 南陽盆地; pinyin: Nányáng Péndì; Jyutping: Naam4joeng4 Pun4dei6) is a major river basin, principally of the Han River (simplified Chinese: 汉水; traditional Chinese: 漢水; pinyin: Hàn Shuǐ; Jyutping: Hon3 Seoi2), located in the central inland part of the People's Republic of China, and thus forms part of the Middle Yangtze region. Much of its northern section is administered by Henan Province, with a smaller southern region of the basin lying in Hubei Province. Its total area is 46291 square kilometers, and it is one of the most populous basins in China, with around 20 million residents.

== Geography ==
The basin lies between 80 and 140 meters above sea level. Most of the minor tributaries within the basin feed into the Tangbai River (Chinese: 唐白河; pinyin: Tángbái Hé; Jyutping: Tong4baak6 ho4), which flows into the Han at the city of Xiangyang (simplified Chinese: 襄阳; traditional Chinese: 襄陽; pinyin: Xiāngyáng; Jyutping: Soeng1joeng4).

The basin also includes the source of the Huai River. Many other tributaries in the basin flow northward into the Yellow River. Thus the basin is a watershed of three major river basins, and is part of a transition zone between the north and the south of China, often forming a buffer zone in Chinese history.

The basin is flanked on three sides by highlands: to the west are the Daba Mountains, to the north lie the Funiu Mountains, an eastern extension of the Qinling Mountains; to the east are the Tongbai Mountains, which separate the valley from the Huai River drainage. To the south and southeast lies the Jianghan Plain, to which lowland access is provided through the Han River valley and the Yun River corridor, with the Dahong Mountains intervening.

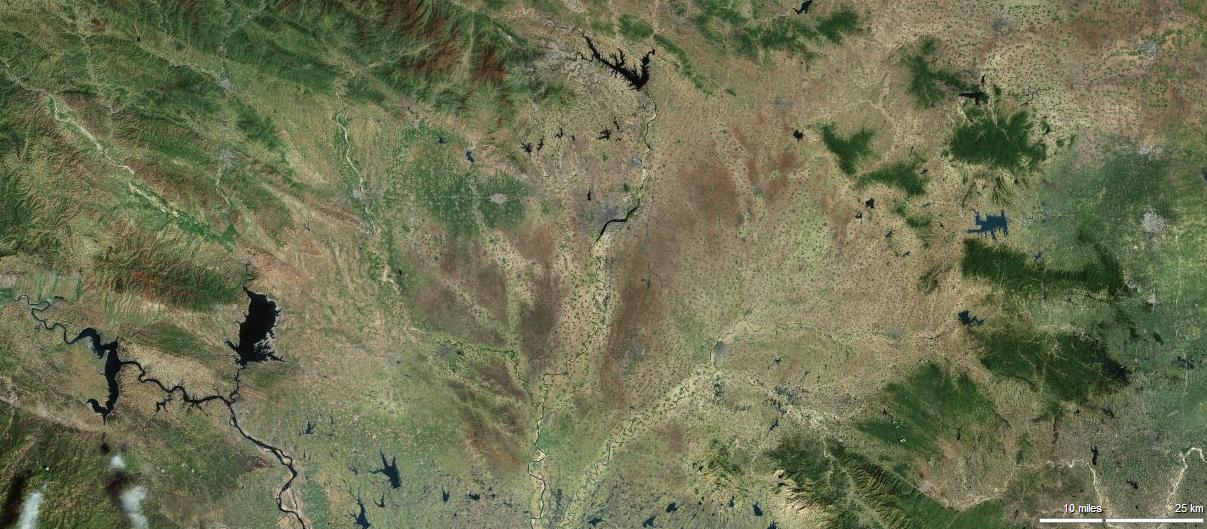
The Nanyang Basin as viewed from space

The basin is home to some of the major historic cities of central China. The eponymous city of Nanyang (simplified Chinese: 南阳; traditional Chinese: 南陽; pinyin: Nányáng; Jyutping: Naam4joeng4) is located in the north-central area of the basin. The other major city, Xiangyang, is an agglomeration of Xiangcheng and Fancheng on opposite banks of the Han River, in the southern extremity of the basin.

Suizhou in the far southeast of the basin along the Yun River, is where the Tomb of Marquis Yi of Zeng, with its famous bianzhong, was discovered in the 1970s. It is presumed that the state of Zeng was located here.

Xichuan County (simplified Chinese: 淅川县; traditional Chinese: 淅川縣; pinyin: Xīchuān Xiàn; Jyutping: Sik1cyun1 jyun6), situated in the northwest of the basin, is presumed to be the cradle of the state of Chu, a major polity of early Chinese history. The first capital of the state, Danyang (simplified Chinese: 丹阳; traditional Chinese: 丹陽; pinyin: Dānyáng; Jyutping: Daan1joeng4), is located in the county, and now falls under the city of Nanyang.
