= Danyang (Chu) =

Capital of Chu, ancient Chinese state

Danyang (Chinese: 丹陽) was the first capital of the State of Chu, a vassal state of the Zhou dynasty. It was likely located near modern-day Xichuan County in Henan Province.

According to the Shiben (Chinese: 世本) the Chu leader Yu Xiong lived in Danyang. Danyang served as the capital of Chu for an estimated 350 years. In the Spring and Autumn Period, following a number of battles with neighbouring states, King Wu of Chu moved the Chu capital to Ying near modern-day Jingzhou City on the Jianghan Plain in the western part of Hubei Province.

== History ==
In Sima Qian's Shiji, a chapter "Chu shi jia" (Chinese: 楚世家 - Hereditary house of Chu) recounts the early years of the Chu dynasty and the establishment of Dayang as its capital. The Shiji explains that King Cheng of Zhou granted Xiong Yi "cultivated fields to rule with the rank of Zinan" (Chinese: 子男), with Dayang as its capital, as a reward for his service and his ancestors' service under King Wen and Wu. According to this account, towards the end of the Shang dynasty and prior to Xiong Yi being granted this title, Chu people had already lived in Dayang.

== Location ==
To this day, the exact location of Danyang is still unknown and has been a source of considerable debate for Chinese and international scholars alike. In addition to Xichuan, other suggested locations have included (among others) modern-day Dangtu, Zigui, Zhijiang, Nanzhang, and Shangxian. Determining its precise location would increase our access to relics unlocking a better understanding of the origins of an as of yet little understood society.

Archaeological findings in the past years have lent substance to some of these theories. For example, in June 2012, twelve bronze bells and a tripod - including one marked as a gift from Chu Ji Baozhong to King Gong of Chu - were found on a construction at the Wanfunao site in Zhijiang, potentially supporting the Zhijiang location hypothesis.

== Cultural relics from Xichuan Chu tomb ==
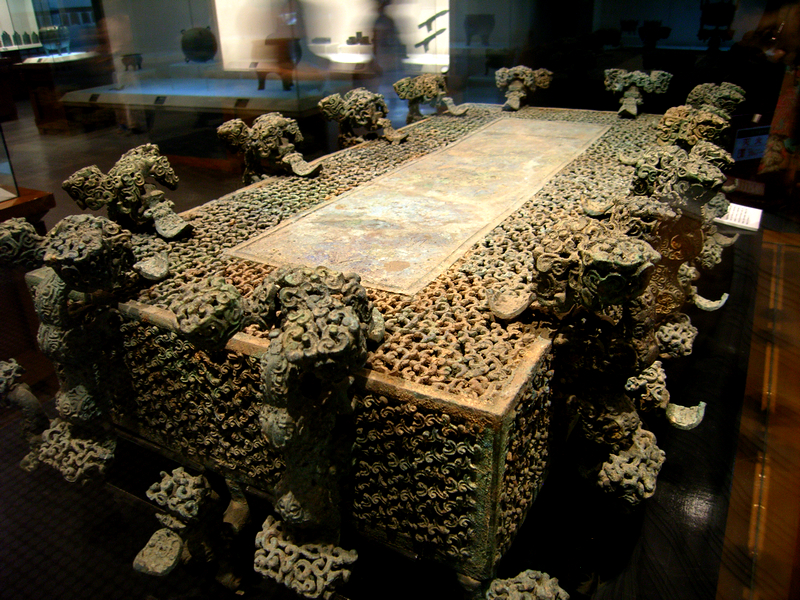

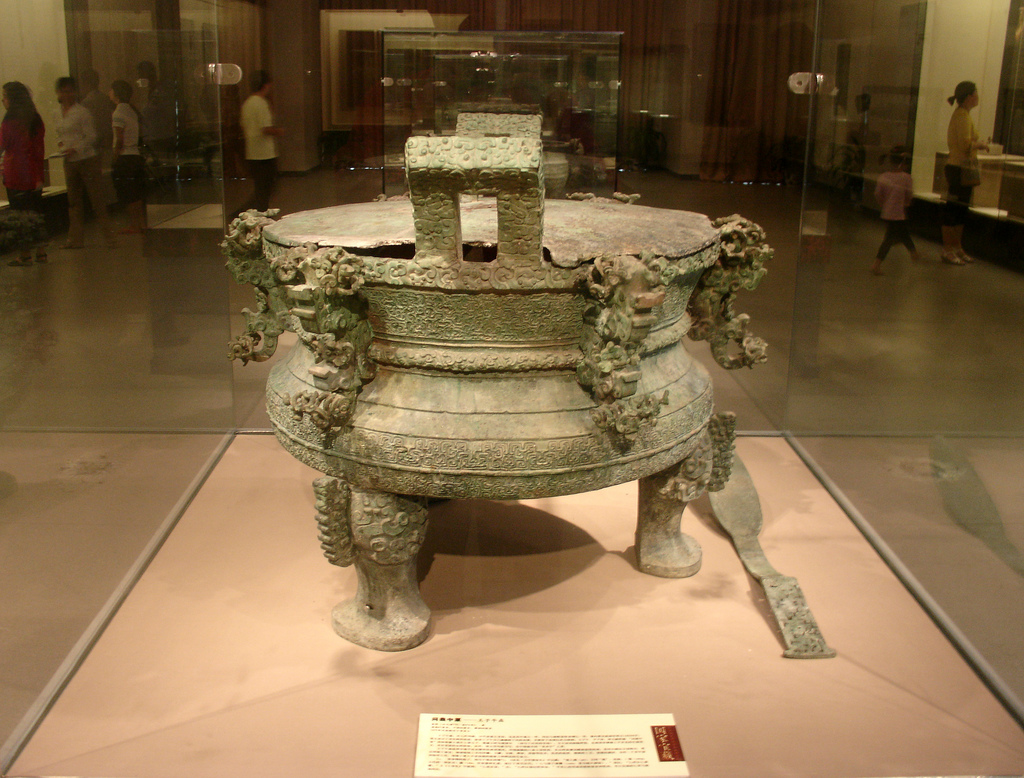
王子午鼎
