= Jiǎng (state) =

Zhou period ancient Chinese state 蔣

Jiang 蔣
- 11th century BCE–617 BCE
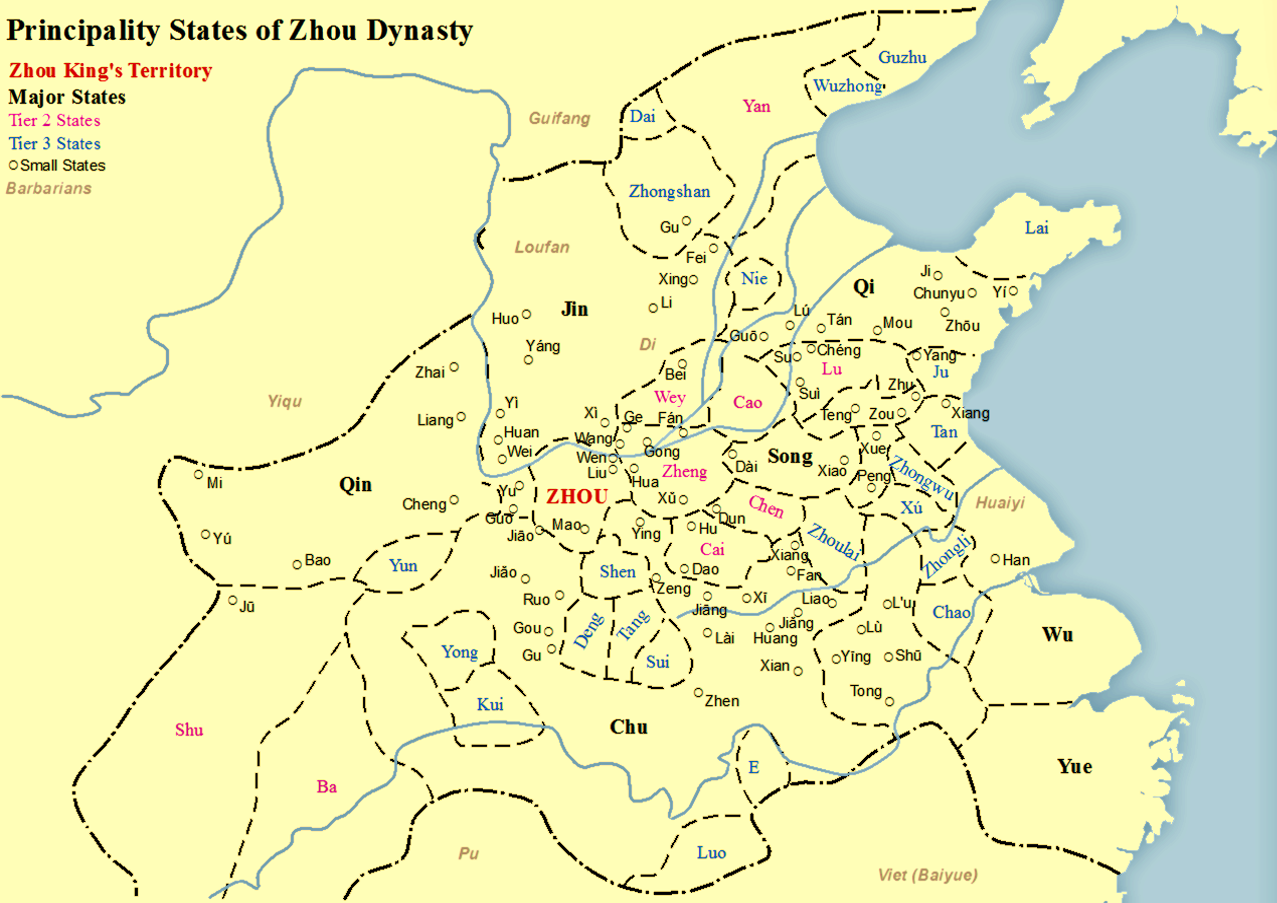
- Map showing states of the Zhou Dynasty (Jiǎng is shown on the map as a small state nearby Zhoulai)
- Capital: Gushi County, Henan
- Government: Monarchy
- History
  - Established: 11th century BCE
  - Invaded/annexed by Chu: 617 BCE
- Today part of: China

Jiang (Chinese: 蔣; pinyin: Jiǎng) was a vassal state that existed during the Zhou dynasty until the middle Spring and Autumn period. In 617 BC it was annexed by the state of Chu.

The state was established right after Duke of Zhou allocated his fourth son Bo Ling to a piece of land in Gushi County, Henan. Bo Ling later used the state name as his own surname.
