= Liao (Zhou dynasty state) =

State of Liao 蓼 / 繆
- ?–622 BCE
- Status: Monarchy
- Capital: Liao town, northeast of Gushi County, Henan Province
- Government: Marquessate (侯)
- History
  - Established: ?
  - Disestablished: 622 BCE

Liao (Chinese: 蓼) was a Zhou dynasty vassal state during the Spring and Autumn period of Chinese history (771–476 BCE). There were two actual states called Liao at this time. The first of these is mentioned in the Zuo Zhuan • 11th Year of Duke Huan of Lu, which records that in 701 BCE, the 40th year of the reign of King Wu of Chu: "The army of the state of Yun (鄖) were at Pusao (蒲騷) together with the armies of the states of Sui, Jiao (絞), Zhou (州) and Liao ready to attack Chu. Pusao was on the site of modern-day Tanghe County, Hubei Province then capital of the State of Liao." The Zuo Zhuan • 17th Year of Duke Ai of Lu records that at the end of the Spring and Autumn period, the Chu State Minister reflected on the achievements of King Wu of Chu in his alliances with the state of Zhao amongst others and the suppression of the state of Liao.

In the case of the second state of Liao, according to the Zuo Zhuan • 5th Year of Duke Wen of Lu, in 622 BCE, the fourth year of King Mu of Chu, "the king of Chu's son wiped out the State of Liao." This state was ruled by the descendants of the Tingjian (庭坚), also known as Gaoyang (高阳) or Bakai (八恺), a group of eight talented individuals who traced their lineage to the Yellow Emperor through Zhuanxu.
