= Ruo (state) =

Ruo 鄀
- Unknown–Unknown
- Status: Viscountcy
- Capital: Upper Ruo (上鄀)/Shangmi (商密) (Note: Modern day Nanyang, Henan Province); Lower Ruo (下鄀)/Ruo (鄀) (Note: South east of modern day Yicheng, Hubei Province)
- Government: viscountcy (子)
- Viscount
- History
  - Established: Unknown
  - Disestablished: Unknown
Preceded by	Succeeded by
Zhou dynasty; Warring States period	State of Chu; State of Qin
- Today part of: China

Ruo was a small vassal state of the Chinese Zhou dynasty (1046–256 BCE) whose rulers used the title Zǐ (子), roughly equivalent to a viscount. Located between the states of Qin and Chu, Ruo was eventually annexed by the Chu state.

== Rise and fall ==
The family name of the ruling house of Ruo, according to Shiben, was Yun (允). Ruo's capital was initially located at Shangmi (商密), also known as “Upper Ruo” (上鄀). In 635 BCE, the State of Qin and its equally powerful ally, the State of Jin, attacked Ruo, whereupon the neighboring State of Chu, also an enemy of Qin and Jin, came to its aid. The people of Shangmi surrendered to Qin, whilst the commander of the Chu army was captured. Thereafter, the Qin army returned to their territory with the Chu pursuit of their troops coming too late. By 622 BCE, Ruo's relations with Qin had become closer, but they still wavered over the question of their relations with Chu. This led to Qin capturing Ruo and incorporating the city into their own territory. Ruo moved its capital into neighboring Hubei Province, close to the city of Yicheng, whereupon it became known as “Lower Ruo” (鄀下). After the move, Ruo became a vassal state of Chu and, at an unknown date, was fully assimilated into the state.

== Legacy ==
In 506 BCE, the tenth year of King Zhao of Chu, the State of Wu attacked the Chu capital Ying. (Note: Modern day Jingzhou, Hubei Province) In the ensuing Battle of Boju, the State of Chu was almost wiped out. Later, the same year, Wu retreated, and King Zhao returned to the capital. A year later, in 507 BCE, Wu defeated Chu's navy once more, raising the threat of their extermination, and thus decided to move their capital from Ying to the eponymous state capital of Ruo, where it would be hidden from the Wu vanguard. As the people of Chu had become used to calling their capital “Ying”, Ruo became known as “Northern Ying”. At what time the capital moved back to its original location of Ying is not known. Some sources suggest that this was in 432 BCE during the reign of King Hui of Chu, making Ruo the capital of Chu for some sixty years.

== Inscriptions on ancient bronze artifacts ==
In his research on bronze instruments discovered in the former State of Ruo, historian Guo Moruo writes that amongst the inscriptions are characters for “Upper Ruo” (上鄀) whilst “Lower Ruo” (下鄀) is written as “蠚” (hē). Guo suggests that these were public utensils..

In a 2001 article entitled “Introductory Explanation of the Shi Shan Pan Inscriptions”, Song Fenghan (朱凤瀚) writes that the inscriptions on Shi Shan Pan artifacts in the National Museum of China mention Ruo and thus show that such a state existed at the time of the Western Zhou dynasty. Zhou Baohong (周宝宏) also makes the association between the State of Ruo and the Spring and Autumn period.
