= Fenmao =

Xiong Xuan
- Viscount of Chu
- Reign: 757–741 BC
Full name
- Family name: Mǐ (羋); Clan name: Xióng (熊); Given name: Xuàn (眴)
Posthumous name
- Fenmao

Fenmao (Chinese: 蚡冒, died 741 BC) was from 757 to 741 BC the monarch of the state of Chu during the early Spring and Autumn period of ancient China. He was born Xiong Xuan (Chinese: 熊眴) and Fenmao was his posthumous title.

Like other early Chu rulers, Fenmao held the hereditary noble rank of viscount that was first granted to his ancestor Xiong Yi by King Cheng of Zhou. However, Han Feizi and Chu Ci referred to him as King Li of Chu (楚厲王).

Fenmao succeeded his father Xiao'ao, who died in 758 BC. He was succeeded by King Wu of Chu, the first Chu ruler to declare himself king.

Fenmao House of Mi Died: 741 BC
Regnal titles
Preceded by Xiao'ao	Viscount of Chu; 757–741 BC	Succeeded by King Wu of Chu
