= Luo (state) =

Luo 羅
- 11th century BC–690 BC
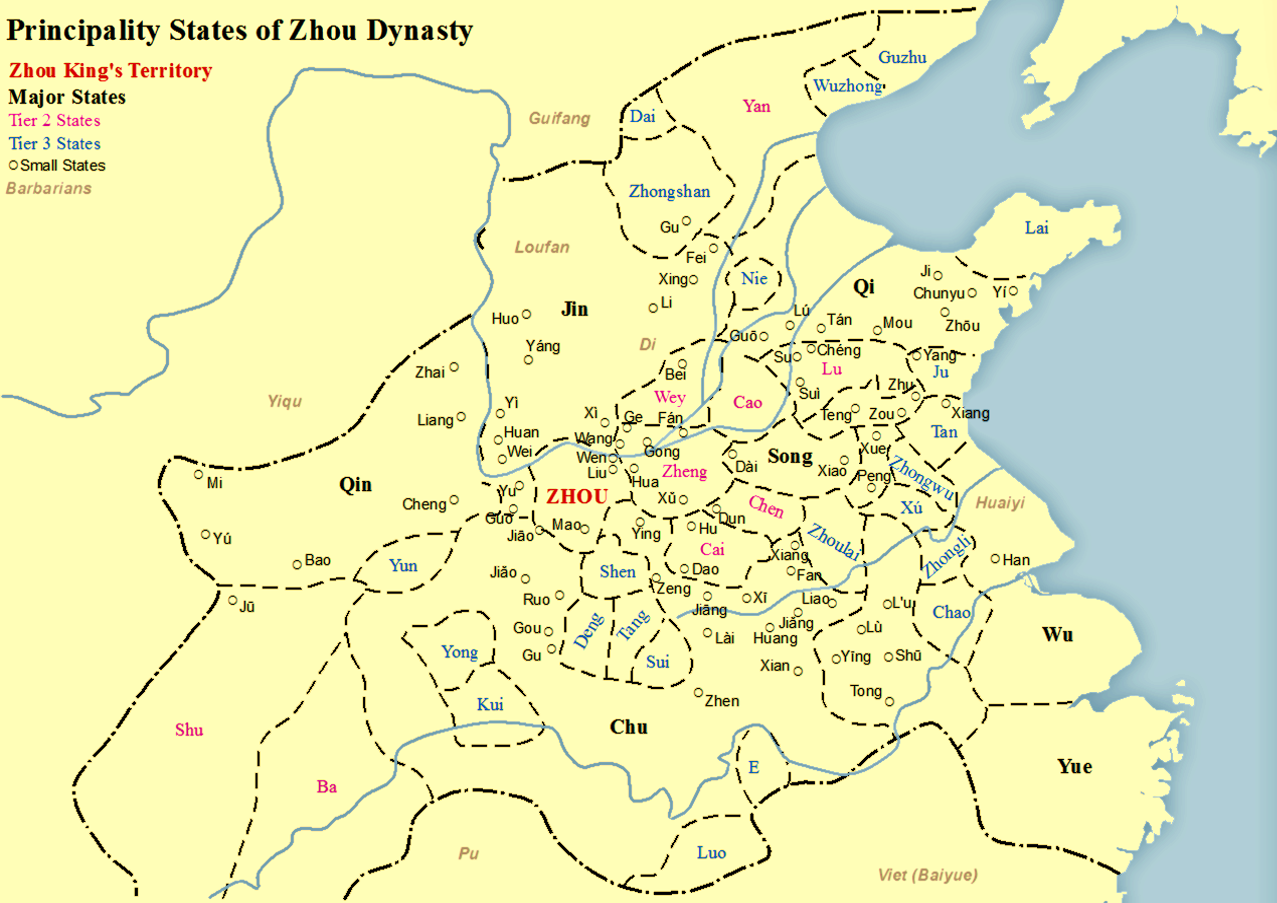
- Map of Zhou dynasty states. Luo is in the south.
- Status: State
- Capital: Yicheng (宜城)
- Religion: Chinese folk religion, ancestor worship
- Government: Monarchy
- History
  - Established: 11th century BC
  - Conquered by Chu: 690 BC
- Currency: Chinese coin
Succeeded by
Qi (state)

Luo (today's Luoshan County, Henan Province) was a minor Chinese feudal state that existed during the Shang dynasty. Afterwards, when Zhou overthrew Shang, it became one of Zhou states during the Spring and Autumn period.

The rulers of Luo shared a common origin with the rulers of Chu.
