= King Wu of Chu =

First king of Chu state (died 690 BC)

King Wu of Chu 楚武王
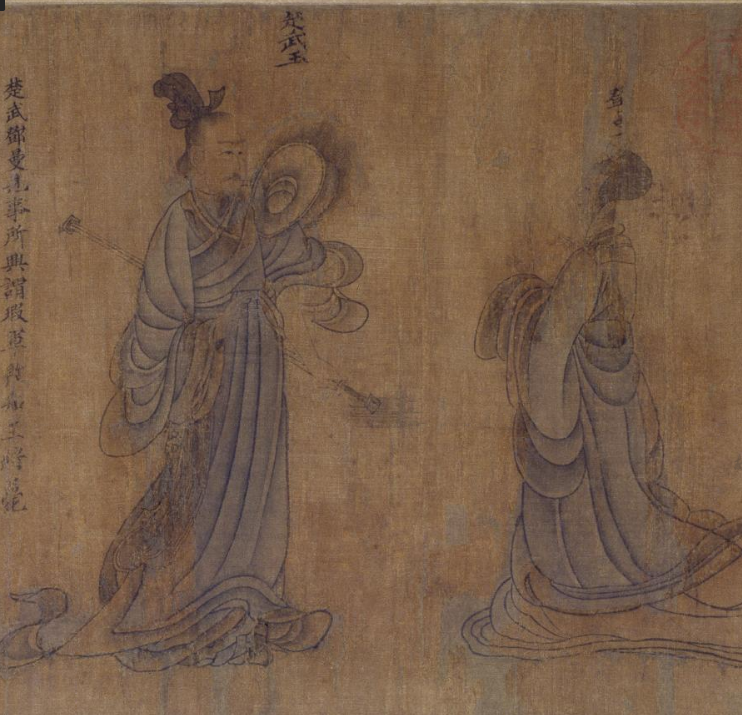
- King Wu of Chu and his queen, as depicted by Gu Kaizhi

King of Chu
- Reign: 704–690 BC
- Predecessor: Himself (as viscount)
- Successor: King Wen

Viscount of Chu
- Reign: 740–704 BC
- Predecessor: Fenmao
- Successor: Himself (as king)
- Died: 690 BC
Names
- Ancestral name: Mǐ (羋); Lineage name: Xióng (熊); Given name: Chè (徹)
Posthumous name
- King Wu (武王)
- House: Mi
- Dynasty: Chu

King Wu of Chu (Chinese: 楚武王), personal name Xiong Che, also known as Xiong Tong, was a monarch of the Chu state. He ruled as viscount from 740 BC to 704 BC, and as king from 704 BC to 690 BC.

He was the second son of Xiao'ao, and brother of the previous ruler, Fenmao, whom he is rumored to have murdered in 740 BC in order to usurp the throne. He was also the first ruler among the Zhou dynasty's vassal states to declare himself "king"; Chu was one of a few states where local rulers styled themselves kings prior to the Warring States period. Other such polities included Wu and Yue.

== Life ==
King Wu married a daughter of the ruler of Deng called Deng Man (邓曼) and installed Dou Bobi (鬬伯比), son of Ruo'ao as Prime Minister and his son Qu Xia (屈瑕) as Mo'ao.

With the power of Chu growing by the day, King Wu became dissatisfied with the title of Viscount (子) and sought to better himself. In the summer of the thirty-seventh year of his reign, 704 BCE, at the time of King Huan of Zhou, he invited the leaders of the other vassal states to a meeting at Shenlu (沈鹿). The states of Ba, Pu (濮), Deng, Jiao (simplified Chinese: 绞; traditional Chinese: 絞), Luo (罗; 羅), Zhen (轸; 軫), Shen, Er (贰; 貳), Yun (鄖) and Jiang (江) all sent representatives with only the States of Huang and Sui (随; 隨) not in attendance. King Wu's minister Wei Zhang (蒍章) was dispatched to Huang to criticize their non-attendance whilst the King and Qu Xia led an army to attack the State of Sui. Sui was overthrown at the Battle of Suqi (速杞之战). The state's leader fled whilst Chu Minister, Dou Dan (鬬丹) captured the Marquess of Sui's chariot along with the chariot division military commander. Thereafter, Sui did not act rashly again. Xiong Che declared himself “King”, marking Chu's formal independence from the Zhou Dynasty. Subsequent rulers of Chu would all style themselves “King”, heralding the start of the vassal kingdoms’ usurpation of Zhou supremacy and the decline of the House of Zhou.

In 700 BCE, the forty-first year of his reign, the Chu army defeated the State of Jiao which subsequently became a vassal of Chu. The following year, King Wu sent his son Qu Xia to attack the State of Luo. Qu Xia underestimated the enemy and became trapped between Lu Rong (卢戎; 庐戎) and the Luo army on the borders of the state. Qu Xia suffered a major defeat and fled with his remaining troops to Huangyu (荒谷) where he hanged himself. King Wu took responsibility for the defeat and pardoned all remaining soldiers who had taken part in the battle, although he already ordered the amputation of their right feet. In 690 BCE, King Wu led his troops on a punitive expedition into the State of Sui. After crossing the Han River and arriving on the eastern bank, he was suddenly taken ill. He sat down under a tree and died not long afterwards. The Chu Prime Minister Dou Qi (鬬祁), son of Dou Dan did not hold a funeral, but instead led the Chu army on the advance westward as originally planned. When the Chu army arrived at the capital of the State of Sui, its rulers capitulated and swore allegiance to Chu. The Chu army withdrew across the Han River where they held a funeral for the late king. Thereafter, his son Xiong Zi ascended the throne as King Wen of Chu.

== Issue ==
- Qu Xia (屈瑕)
- King Wen of Chu
- Prince Ziyuan (子元)

== Notes ==
1. Some sources state that King Wu murdered Xiong Xuan’s son, not his actual brother.
2. An ancestor of noted Warring States period poet Qu Yuan.
3. A senior official in the Chu state government.
4. East of modern day Zhongxiang City, Hubei Province.
5. On the border of modern day Jiangling County, Hubei Province
6. later changed to Tōng (通) in historical records due to naming taboo with Emperor Wu of Han

King Wu of Chu House of Mi Died: 591 BC
Regnal titles
| Preceded by Fenmao as Viscount of Chu | King of Chu; 740–690 BC | Succeeded by King Wen of Chu |
