= Gushi County =

County in Henan, People's Republic of China

Gushi County 固始县 Kushih
- County
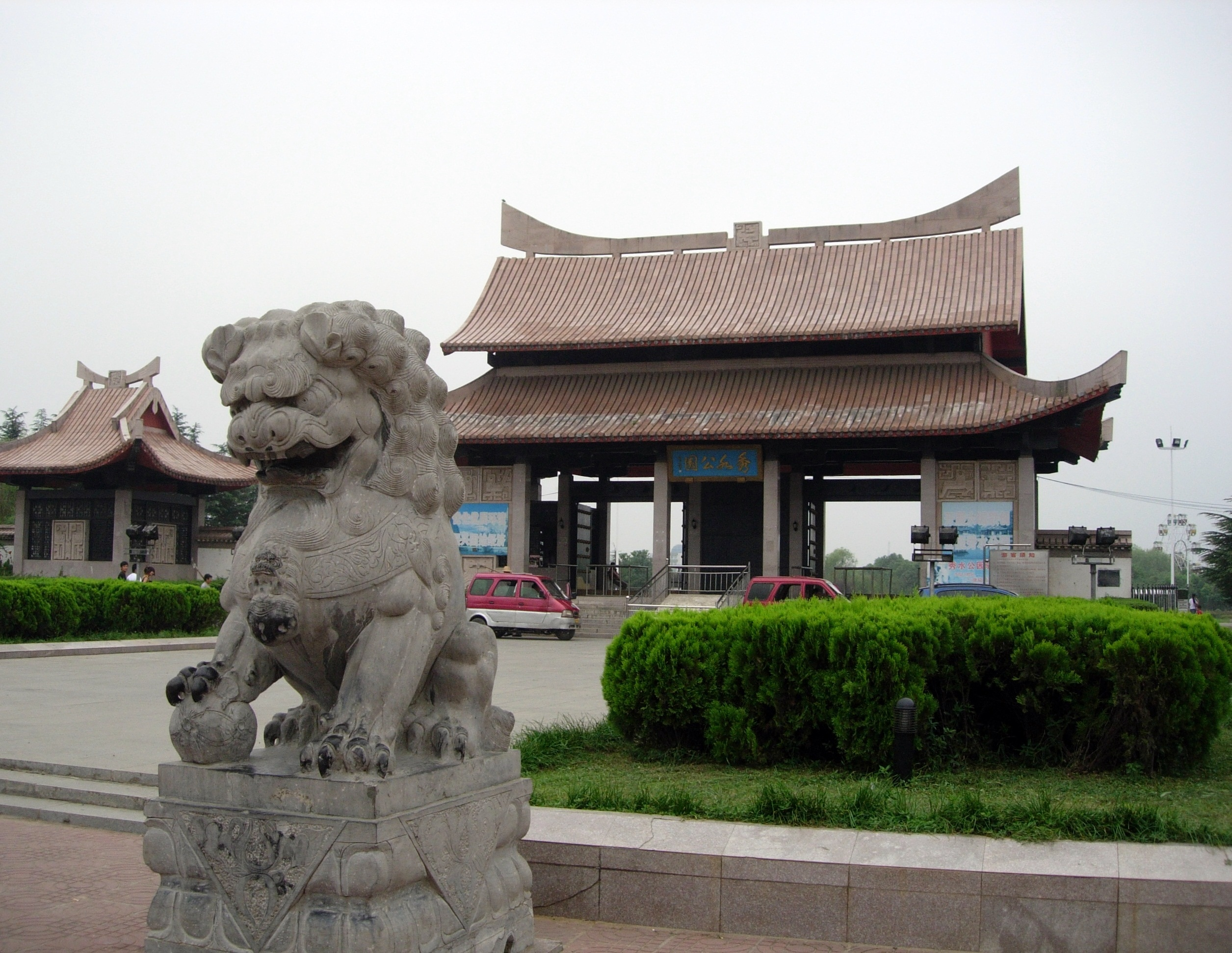
- North gate of Xiushui Park

- Location in Henan
- Coordinates: 32°11′N 115°40′E
- Country: People's Republic of China
- Province: Henan
- Prefecture-level city: Xinyang

Area
  - County: 2,916 km^{2} (1,126 sq mi)
  - Water: 71.8 km^{2} (27.7 sq mi) 2.44%
  - Urban: 35.03 km^{2} (13.53 sq mi)
- Highest elevation: 1,025 m (3,363 ft)
- Lowest elevation: 23 m (75 ft)

Population (2019)
  - County: 1,102,500
  - Density: 378.1/km^{2} (979.2/sq mi)
- Time zone: UTC+8 (China Standard)
- Postal code: 465200
- Area code: 0376
- Administrative division code: 419009
- Website: gsxzf.gov.cn

Gushi County
- "Gushi" in Chinese
- Chinese: 固始
- Postal: Kushi
- Literal meaning: "a Solid Start"
Transcriptions
Standard Mandarin
- Hanyu Pinyin: Gùshǐ
- Wade–Giles: Ku^{4}-shih^{3}

Gushi (Chinese: 固始; pinyin: Gùshǐ) is a county of 1,023,857 people directly governed by Henan, People's Republic of China. It is administered by the prefecture-level city of Xinyang. With a total area of 2942.97 square kilometers and a registered population of 1,781,500 at the end of 2018, it is the county with the largest registered population in Henan.

== Administration ==
Gushi has 3 subdistricts, 17 towns and 13 townships.

Map	Subdistricts			Towns			Townships		
Map	Subdivision		Chinese	Subdivision		Chinese	Subdivision		Chinese
	1	Liaocheng	蓼城街道	4	Chenlinzi	陈淋子镇	21	Hongbu	洪埠乡
	2	Xiushui	秀水街道	5	Liji	黎集镇	22	Yangji	杨集乡
	3	Pancheng	番城街道	6	Jiangji	蒋集镇	23	Magangji	马堽集乡
				7	Wangliu	往流镇	24	Caomiaoji	草庙集乡
				8	Guolutan	郭陆滩镇	25	Nandaqiao	南大桥乡
				9	Huzupu	胡族铺镇	26	Zhaogang	赵岗乡
				10	Fangji	方集镇	27	Zhanglaobu	张老埠乡
				11	Sanhejian	三河尖镇	28	Shahepu	沙河铺乡
				12	Duanji	段集镇	29	Xuji	徐集乡
				13	Wangpeng	汪棚镇	30	Lidian	李店乡
				14	Zhangguangmiao	张广庙镇	31	Fenggang	丰港乡
				15	Chenji	陈集镇	32	Liushudian	柳树店乡
				16	Wumiaoji	武庙集镇	33	Guantang	观堂乡
				17	Fenshuiting	分水亭镇			
				18	Shifodian	石佛店镇			
				19	Quanhepu	泉河铺镇			
				20	Zushimiao	祖师庙镇			

== History ==
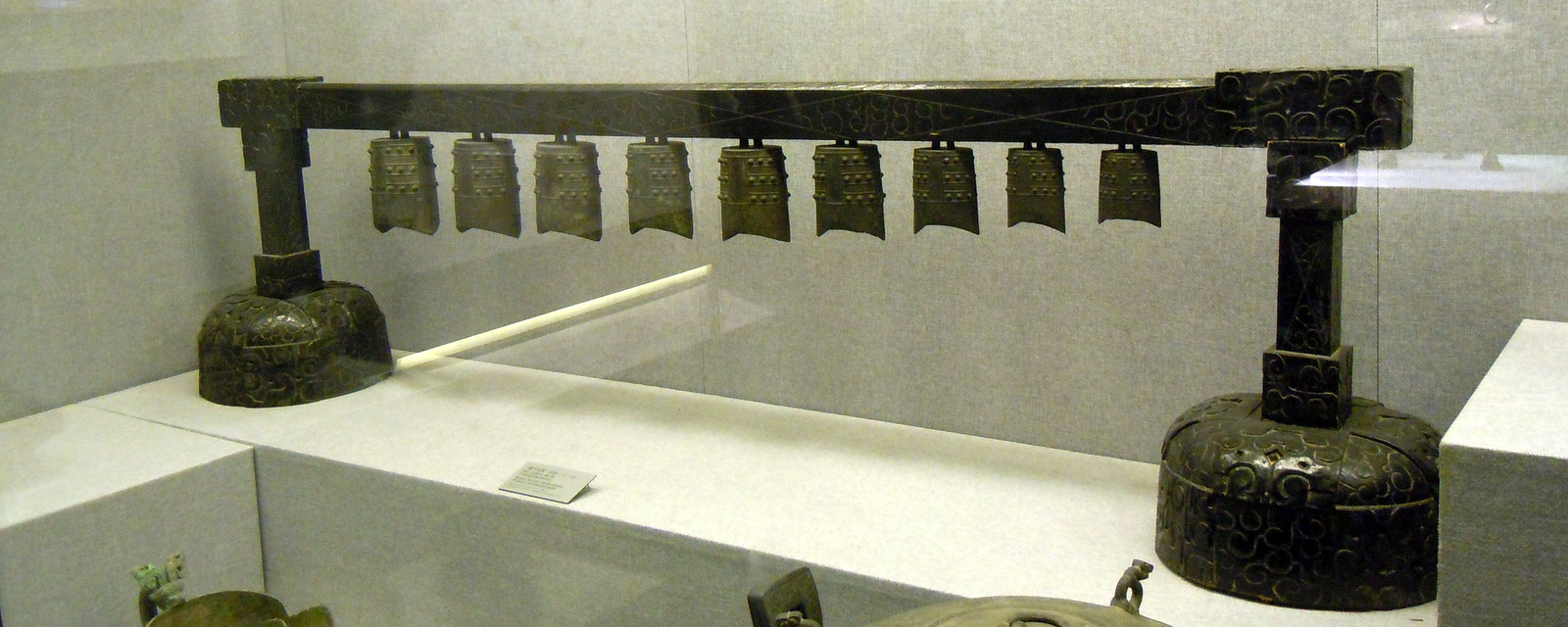
A set of bronze Niu-bells (Bianzhong) with inscriptions in Spring and Autumn period excavated from Tomb 1, Hougudui.

Gushi County was the capital of one of the two States of Liao during the Spring and Autumn period of Chinese history (771–436 BCE).

== Climate ==
Climate data for Gushi, elevation 43 m (141 ft), (1991–2020 normals, extremes 1981–present)
Month	Jan	Feb	Mar	Apr	May	Jun	Jul	Aug	Sep	Oct	Nov	Dec	Year
Record high °C (°F)	21.3 (70.3)	28.5 (83.3)	35.9 (96.6)	34.4 (93.9)	36.8 (98.2)	36.9 (98.4)	39.4 (102.9)	39.2 (102.6)	38.5 (101.3)	34.1 (93.4)	29.6 (85.3)	23.8 (74.8)	39.4 (102.9)
Mean daily maximum °C (°F)	6.9 (44.4)	10.1 (50.2)	15.6 (60.1)	22.2 (72.0)	26.8 (80.2)	29.5 (85.1)	32.0 (89.6)	31.2 (88.2)	27.5 (81.5)	22.4 (72.3)	15.9 (60.6)	9.4 (48.9)	20.8 (69.4)
Daily mean °C (°F)	2.5 (36.5)	5.5 (41.9)	10.5 (50.9)	16.8 (62.2)	21.9 (71.4)	25.3 (77.5)	27.9 (82.2)	27.0 (80.6)	22.8 (73.0)	17.2 (63.0)	10.7 (51.3)	4.7 (40.5)	16.1 (60.9)
Mean daily minimum °C (°F)	−0.7 (30.7)	1.9 (35.4)	6.3 (43.3)	12.2 (54.0)	17.7 (63.9)	21.8 (71.2)	24.7 (76.5)	23.9 (75.0)	19.3 (66.7)	13.3 (55.9)	6.7 (44.1)	1.2 (34.2)	12.4 (54.2)
Record low °C (°F)	−14.9 (5.2)	−11.0 (12.2)	−2.6 (27.3)	0.1 (32.2)	6.9 (44.4)	12.8 (55.0)	18.0 (64.4)	14.8 (58.6)	10.2 (50.4)	2.0 (35.6)	−6.0 (21.2)	−13.8 (7.2)	−14.9 (5.2)
Average precipitation mm (inches)	38.7 (1.52)	43.7 (1.72)	73.3 (2.89)	79.1 (3.11)	102.0 (4.02)	164.0 (6.46)	218.8 (8.61)	135.1 (5.32)	75.7 (2.98)	65.9 (2.59)	52.2 (2.06)	27.0 (1.06)	1,075.5 (42.34)
Average precipitation days (≥ 0.1 mm)	7.8	8.6	9.7	8.8	11.1	10.4	12.3	12.0	9.0	8.5	8.0	6.3	112.5
Average snowy days	4.9	2.8	1.3	0	0	0	0	0	0	0	0.7	1.7	11.4
Average relative humidity (%)	74	73	70	69	71	77	81	82	77	74	74	72	75
Mean monthly sunshine hours	117.9	118.7	153.7	184.7	190.9	180.4	195.6	179.7	154.5	151.0	143.0	132.4	1,902.5
Percentage possible sunshine	37	38	41	47	45	42	45	44	42	43	46	43	43
Source 1: China Meteorological Administration
Source 2: Chorography of Gushi

== Demographic ==
Population of Gushi since the 14th century

Ancient times
Year	Pop.	±%
1392	71,082	—
1412	70,420	−0.9%
1452	77,612	+10.2%
1462	78,570	+1.2%
1472	73,531	−6.4%
1475	52,038	−29.2%
1482	48,417	−7.0%
1492	52,075	+7.6%
1502	50,451	−3.1%
1512	52,180	+3.4%
1522	52,500	+0.6%
1532	52,136	−0.7%
1542	42,160	−19.1%
1596	53,889	+27.8%
1777	318,942	+491.8%

20th century and after
Year	Pop.	±%
1935	523,950	—
1945	529,034	+1.0%
1950	705,430	+33.3%
1955	754,734	+7.0%
1960	702,784	−6.9%
1965	814,277	+15.9%
1970	989,300	+21.5%
1975	1,148,370	+16.1%
1980	1,217,817	+6.0%
1985	1,263,694	+3.8%
1990	1,363,100	+7.9%
1995	1,465,100	+7.5%
2000	1,529,400	+4.4%
2005	1,566,100	+2.4%
2010	1,722,000	+10.0%
2013	1,734,100	+0.7%

Gushi is the most-populous county in the Henan Province, with an estimated record high of 1,734,100 citizens with registration as of 2013, according to the 2013 annual statistics report. As of the sixth national census in 2010, there are 1,023,857 residents living inside the county, showing that nearly half of the population moved out of the county without changing their residents registration status.

In 2010, the county had a population density of 348 people per square kilometer (900 people/mi^{2}).

== Transportation ==
The Nanjing–Xi'an Railway along as G40 Shanghai–Xi'an Expressway passing through the southern side of Gushi from the east to the west, connect the county with Xinyang and Hefei. A branch line, S39 Huaibin-Gushi Expressway links the county seat to the national expressway network from north to south. One major railway station located in the Town of Duanji in the southern part of the county and three intersections of the expressways have connections with local roads in the central and southern area. The national highway network, connecting other counties in this region, consists of three different routes: Line 220, Line 312 and Line 328. In the north border to Anhui, Huai River flowing from the west to the east serves as a class III Waterway.

== Notable people ==
- Chen Yuanguang, Sacred Prince, Developer of Zhangzhou
- Wang Shenzhi, the founder of the Min Kingdom on the southeast coast of China
