= King Wen of Chu =

King of Chu from 689 to 677 BC

King Wen of Chu 楚文王

King of Chu
- Reign: 689–677 BC
- Predecessor: King Wu
- Successor: Du'ao
- Died: 677 BC
- Spouse: Xi Gui (息媯)
- Issue: Du'ao; King Cheng; Wen Mi (文羋); Jiang Mi (江羋)
Names
- Ancestral name: Mǐ (羋); Lineage name: Xióng (熊); Given name: Zī (貲)
Posthumous name
- King Wen (文王)
- House: Mi
- Dynasty: Chu
- Father: King Wu

King Wen of Chu (Chinese: 楚文王; pinyin: Chǔ Wén Wáng), personal name Xiong Zi, was from 689 BC to 677 BC the king of the Chu state.

King Wen succeeded his father, King Wu, who died in 690 BC. He died in 677 BC and was succeeded by one of his sons, Du'ao.

King Wen of Chu House of Mi Died: 677 BC
Regnal titles
Preceded by King Wu of Chu	King of Chu; 689–677 BC	Succeeded by Du'ao
