= Yicheng, Hubei =

Yicheng 宜城市 Icheng, I-ch'eng, Tzu-chung
- County-level city
- Location in Hubei
- Coordinates (Yicheng government): 31°43′16″N 112°15′25″E
- Country: People's Republic of China
- Province: Hubei
- Prefecture-level city: Xiangyang

Area
  - County-level city: 2,115 km^{2} (817 sq mi)
  - Urban: 48.00 km^{2} (18.53 sq mi)

Population (2020)
  - County-level city: 469,417
  - Density: 221.9/km^{2} (574.8/sq mi)
  - Urban: 244,410
- Time zone: UTC+8 (China Standard)
- Website: ych.gov.cn

Yicheng (Chinese: 宜城; pinyin: Yíchéng) is a county-level city in northwestern Hubei, People's Republic of China. It is under the administration of Xiangyang City.

== History ==
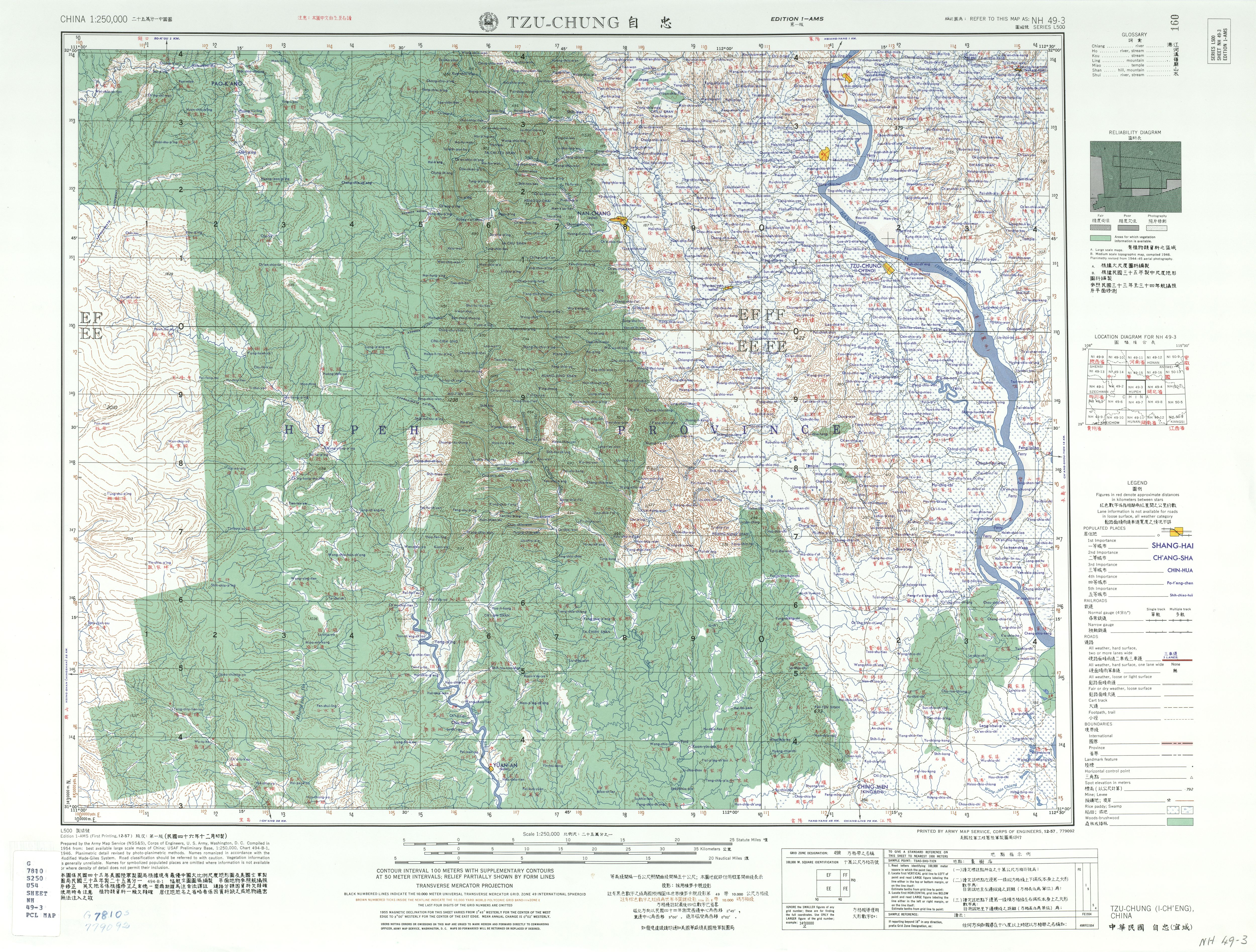
Map including Yicheng (TZU-CHUNG (I-CH'ENG) 自忠 (宜城)) (AMS, 1954)

In 1945, in order to commemorate the anti-Japanese generals Zhang Zizhong in the Battle of Zaoyi, renamed Zizhong County, belonged to the Office of the Administrative Inspector of the Fifth District of Hubei Province. After December 1947, the area east of Hanshui was under the jurisdiction of the Chinese Communist Party (liberated zone). After July 1948, the west of Hanshui was under the jurisdiction of the Chinese Communist Party. In 1949, Yicheng County was restored and it was subordinated to the Commissioner of the Xiangyang Administrative Region of Hubei Province.

In June 1994, Yicheng County was cancelled and Yicheng City was established with the approval of the State Council.

== Geography ==
Yicheng City is located in the northwest of Hubei Province, Hanjiang midstream. East boundary Suizhou, Zaoyang, south Zhongxiang, Jingmen, west Nanjing, north to Xiangyang. It is located at 111°57′-112°45′ east longitude and 31°26′-31°54′ north latitude. It is 76 kilometers long from east to west and 53 kilometers wide from north to south, with a total area of 2115 square kilometers.

== Climate ==
Climate data for Yicheng, elevation 68 m (223 ft), (1991–2020 normals, extremes 1959–present)
Month	Jan	Feb	Mar	Apr	May	Jun	Jul	Aug	Sep	Oct	Nov	Dec	Year
Record high °C (°F)	20.3 (68.5)	24.1 (75.4)	33.7 (92.7)	32.9 (91.2)	36.4 (97.5)	37.5 (99.5)	40.4 (104.7)	40.0 (104.0)	37.9 (100.2)	32.4 (90.3)	26.7 (80.1)	18.9 (66.0)	40.4 (104.7)
Mean daily maximum °C (°F)	7.7 (45.9)	11.0 (51.8)	16.1 (61.0)	22.5 (72.5)	27.4 (81.3)	30.4 (86.7)	32.0 (89.6)	31.6 (88.9)	27.6 (81.7)	22.6 (72.7)	16.0 (60.8)	9.9 (49.8)	21.2 (70.2)
Daily mean °C (°F)	3.2 (37.8)	6.0 (42.8)	10.8 (51.4)	16.8 (62.2)	21.9 (71.4)	25.7 (78.3)	27.7 (81.9)	26.9 (80.4)	22.6 (72.7)	17.3 (63.1)	11.0 (51.8)	5.2 (41.4)	16.3 (61.3)
Mean daily minimum °C (°F)	−0.2 (31.6)	2.1 (35.8)	6.6 (43.9)	12.3 (54.1)	17.5 (63.5)	22.1 (71.8)	24.6 (76.3)	23.7 (74.7)	19.1 (66.4)	13.5 (56.3)	7.2 (45.0)	1.6 (34.9)	12.5 (54.5)
Record low °C (°F)	−7.2 (19.0)	−8.2 (17.2)	−3.2 (26.2)	0.0 (32.0)	8.2 (46.8)	13.8 (56.8)	18.2 (64.8)	16.9 (62.4)	11.3 (52.3)	0.9 (33.6)	−3.3 (26.1)	−11.0 (12.2)	−11.0 (12.2)
Average precipitation mm (inches)	22.6 (0.89)	27.3 (1.07)	46.8 (1.84)	75.5 (2.97)	107.7 (4.24)	115.3 (4.54)	151.1 (5.95)	152.4 (6.00)	76.4 (3.01)	69.6 (2.74)	41.2 (1.62)	17.1 (0.67)	903 (35.54)
Average precipitation days (≥ 0.1 mm)	6.7	8.2	9.6	9.9	11.9	10.9	12.1	10.6	10.2	9.8	8.6	6.4	114.9
Average snowy days	4.4	3.2	1.1	0	0	0	0	0	0	0	0.6	2.0	11.3
Average relative humidity (%)	75	74	74	75	74	78	83	83	79	77	77	75	77
Mean monthly sunshine hours	98.9	103.6	135.5	161.3	168.3	159.1	181.5	184.8	142.7	131.0	115.9	103.2	1,685.8
Percentage possible sunshine	31	33	36	41	39	38	42	45	39	38	37	33	38
Source: China Meteorological Administration all-time extreme temperature all-time January high

== Administration ==
Yicheng administers 2 subdistricts, 8 towns, and 3 other township-level divisions.

Two subdistricts:

- Yancheng Subdistrict (鄢城街道), Nanying Subdistrict (南营街道)

Eight towns:

- Zhengji (郑集镇), Xiaohe (小河镇), Liuhou (刘猴镇), Kongwan (孔湾镇), Liushui (流水镇), Banqiao (板桥镇, or Banqiaodian 板桥店镇), Wangji (王集镇), Leihe (雷河镇)

Three other areas:

- Yicheng Economic Development Zone (宜城经济开发区), Dayan Industrial Park (大雁工业园区), Re-education Through Labor camp (劳教所)

== Demographics ==
At the end of 2006, the city's total population was 564,500, of which the urban population was 226,600, the rural population was 335,900, the annual birth population was 4,770, the birth rate was 8.45 ‰; the death toll was 3,278, the mortality rate was 5.81 ‰; the natural growth rate was 2.64 ‰.

== Historical Figures ==
Songyu, Xianglang, Xiangpang, Maliang, MaWei, Zhongliang, Wangning, Zhou Renshou, Lu Guiyuan, Wang Wanfang, Duancheng, Wang Yi, Zhang Zizhong
