= Zeng (state) =

Zhou dynasty Chinese state

Zeng 曾
- Western Zhou (1045–771 BC)–5th century BC
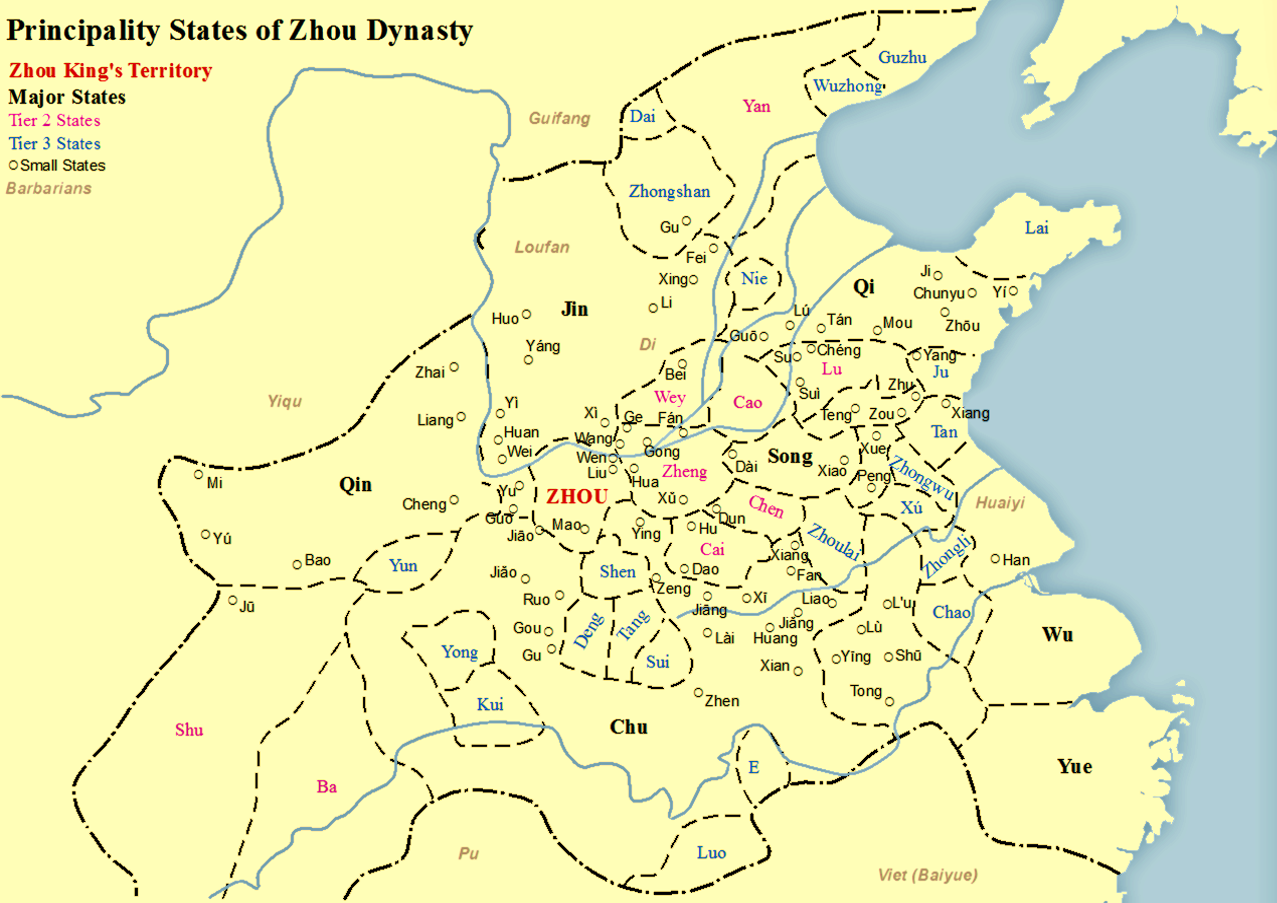
- Map showing the state of Zeng during Zhou dynasty
- History
  - Established: Western Zhou (1045–771 BC)
  - Disestablished: 5th century BC

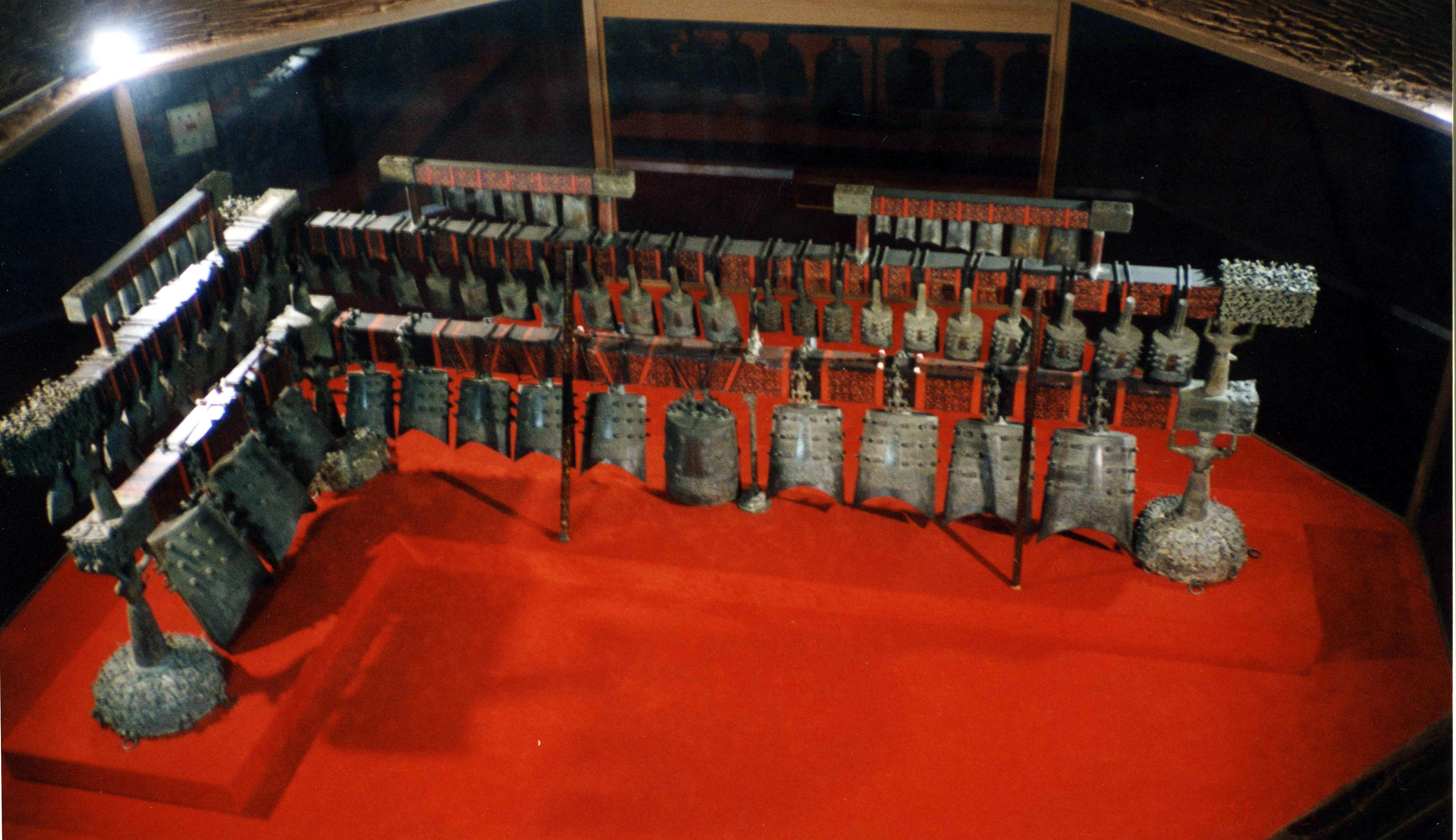
Bronze bells from Tomb of Marquis Yi of Zeng.

Zeng (Chinese: 曾; pinyin: Zēng), also known as Sui (simplified Chinese: 随; traditional Chinese: 隨; pinyin: Suí), was a historical state in China. The state existed during the time of the Zhou dynasty (1046–256 BC) and had territory in the area around Suizhou in modern Hubei province. Archaeological findings indicate that Zeng could have been the same state as Sui. The state of Zeng got attention partly because of the finding of Tomb of Marquis Yi of Zeng in 1978.

The center of the territory of Zeng was in the western part of Suizhou and findings indicate that the area reached up to the south west border of Henan province. Suizhou was an important military hub because of its strategic location towards the threatening state of Chu. The area was also an important transport route between Chinese Central Plateau and the copper findings at the middle Yangtze. All the tombs of the lords of Zeng state were found within 10 km from each other in Suizhou.

A historical record indicate that the state of Zeng was founded during the time of Western Zhou (1045 – 771 BC) and had its peak of political ambitions in the beginning of Eastern Zhou (770–256 BC). Zeng still existed in the beginning of the Warring States period that started in the early 5th-century BC.

Zeng was mentioned in the historical chronicle Spring and Autumn Annals where also another state named Zeng was mentioned that was located in the Shandong province.

== History ==
During the initial stages of the Spring and Autumn period from 771 BCE, the power of Zeng's neighbor the State of Chu grew considerably. At the same time Zeng also expanded and became leader of the various vassal states whose leaders bore the surname Ji known as the Hanyang Ji Vassals (汉阳诸姬).

The Zuo Zhuan records that in 706 BCE King Wu of Chu invaded the State of Zeng on the grounds that the state's minister Ji Liang (季梁) had halted the king's army. Not long afterwards, the Zeng military commander received Chu Prime Minister Dou Bobi (鬬伯比) who concluded that given the opportunity Zeng would conspire against Chu. Two years later in the summer of 704 BCE following Zeng's non-appearance at a meeting of the vassal states called at Shenlu (沈鹿), King Wu of Chu personally led his army in an attack on Zeng. Thereafter Zeng was defeated at the Battle of Suqi (速杞之战). The state's leader fled whilst Chu minister Dou Dan (鬬丹) captured the Marquess of Zeng's chariot along with the chariot division military commander. However, at that time Chu did not have sufficient power to annex Zeng and peace followed in the same year.

In 690 BCE King Wu died in the course of an expedition into Zeng at a time when the latter state wanted peace. Over the following decades, Chu gradually annexed Hanyang Ji Vassals in every direction. In 640 BCE the vassals attacked Chu with Zeng as their leader but were defeated and entered into peace talks.

By the time of the Battle of Chengpu in 632 BCE, the State of Jin had held talks with all the Hanyang Ji Vassals. Zeng was reduced to the status of Chu vassal, no longer independent and not qualified to attend meetings of the vassal states.

The Chu capital at Ying suffered an attack by the State of Wu in 506 BCE whereupon King Zhao of Chu fled to Zeng. Although under pressure from Wu, Zeng would not hand over King Zhao and protected him well. For this reason Zeng was rewarded by Chu. For the year 494 BCE the Spring and Autumn Annals records: "The Prince of Chu, the Marquess of Chen and the Marquess of Zeng attacked the State of Cai". Based on the History of Lu section of the same book later author Du Yu believed that Chu restored Zeng's independence as a marquessate in return for their protection of King Zhao.

At some unknown later date, Zeng was finally annexed by Chu.

== Connection between Sui and Zeng ==
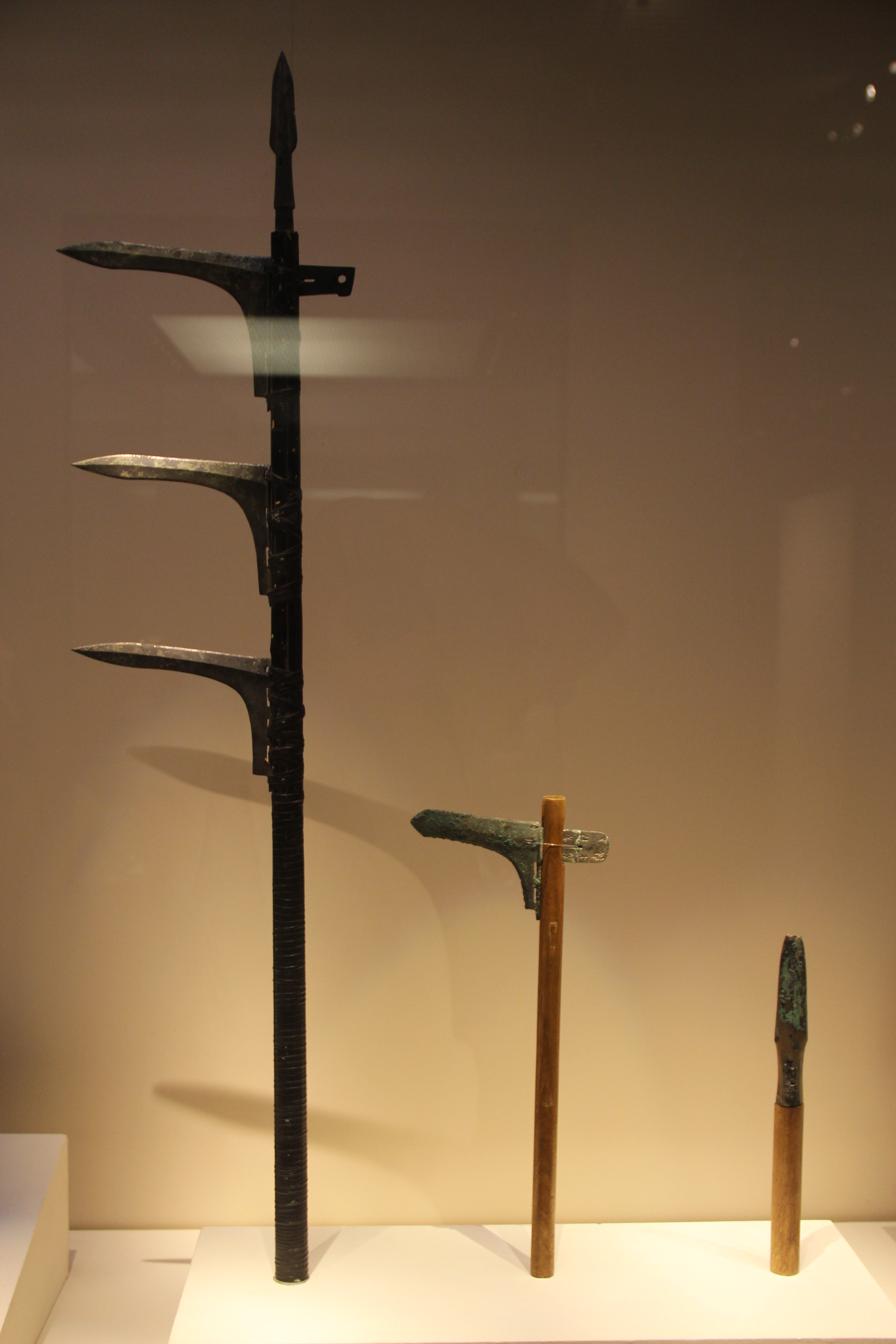
Triple dagger-axe ji from the state of Zeng

Historians initially considered Zeng and Sui to be different cities. In most of the earliest Chinese historical annals, Sui was the only state mentioned in the actual area around Suizhou in Hubei during the time for Eastern Zhou. Based on a few relics in the 1930s where the state of Zeng was mentioned, historian started to speculate that another state also existed in the area at the same time. A large number of findings with inscriptions of "Zeng" were found after 1949 in the territory of former Sui; this confirmed the speculation. In January 2013, a late Spring and Autumn period, early Warring States period bronze halberd (ge) belonging to the chancellor of the Sui state, inscribed with the text "随大司马献有之行戈," was uncovered during excavations in a Zeng state tomb complex in Suizhou. This is an extremely important discovery for researchers studying the relationship between the Sui and Zeng states, in addition to a large bronze bell detailing inter-state relations between Chu, Wu and Zeng, when corresponding written records state Chu, Wu and Sui. Among other artifacts discovered were Western Zhou period bronzes detailing the founding of the Zeng State by descendants of Nangong Kuo, enfeoffed in Suizhou to pacify the local Huaiyi tribes.

The tomb of the Marquess of Zeng (曾侯) excavated in Sui County, Hubei in 1978 uncovered a large quantity of well-preserved relics in an area that was always believed to be part of Sui's territory. This led to a discussion on the relationship between Sui and Zeng with historian Li Xueqin publishing an article in the Guangming Daily on October 4, 1978, entitled “The Riddle of the State of Zeng” (曾国之谜). In this article he writes that the states of Sui and Zeng were actually the same place although there are many other theories including Zeng conquering Sui, Sui overthrowing Zeng and Chu overthrowing Zeng and moving its location to Sui.

After the finding of Tomb of Marquis Yi of Zeng in 1978 together with a large number of other well-preserved artefacts from the same area led to discussions around the relationship between Zeng and Sui, and many theories figured. On October 4, 1978, the historian Li Xueqin published the article "The Riddle of the State of Zeng" in Guangming Daily where he stated that the state of Zeng and Sui were the same place.

The professor Ren Wei from the Archaeology Department of Zhengzhou University had the theory that Zeng conquered and occupied the state of Sui, but the most supported theory is the one from Li Xueqin and it was common during the Eastern Zhou that one state use two names.

== See also ==
- Marquis of Sui's pearl
