= Marquis of Sui's pearl =

Chinese folktale

The Marquis of Sui's pearl or the Suihouzhu (Chinese: 隨侯珠; pinyin: Suíhóuzhū) was a famous gemstone in a Warring States period (475–221 BCE) folktale about a ruler of Sui state who was given an amazing luminous pearl by a grateful snake whose life he had saved. In the history of folkloristics, this legend is the earliest known example of the "Grateful Animals" motif. The Marquis of Sui's pearl, which is frequently paired with another famous regalia, the Heshibi, became a literary Chinese metaphor for underestimating a valuable person or thing.

== Terminology ==
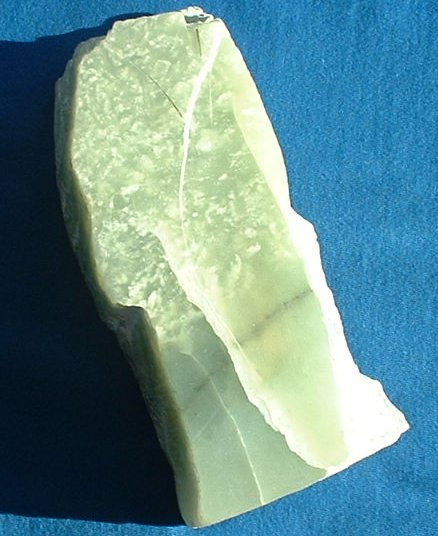
Uncut jade

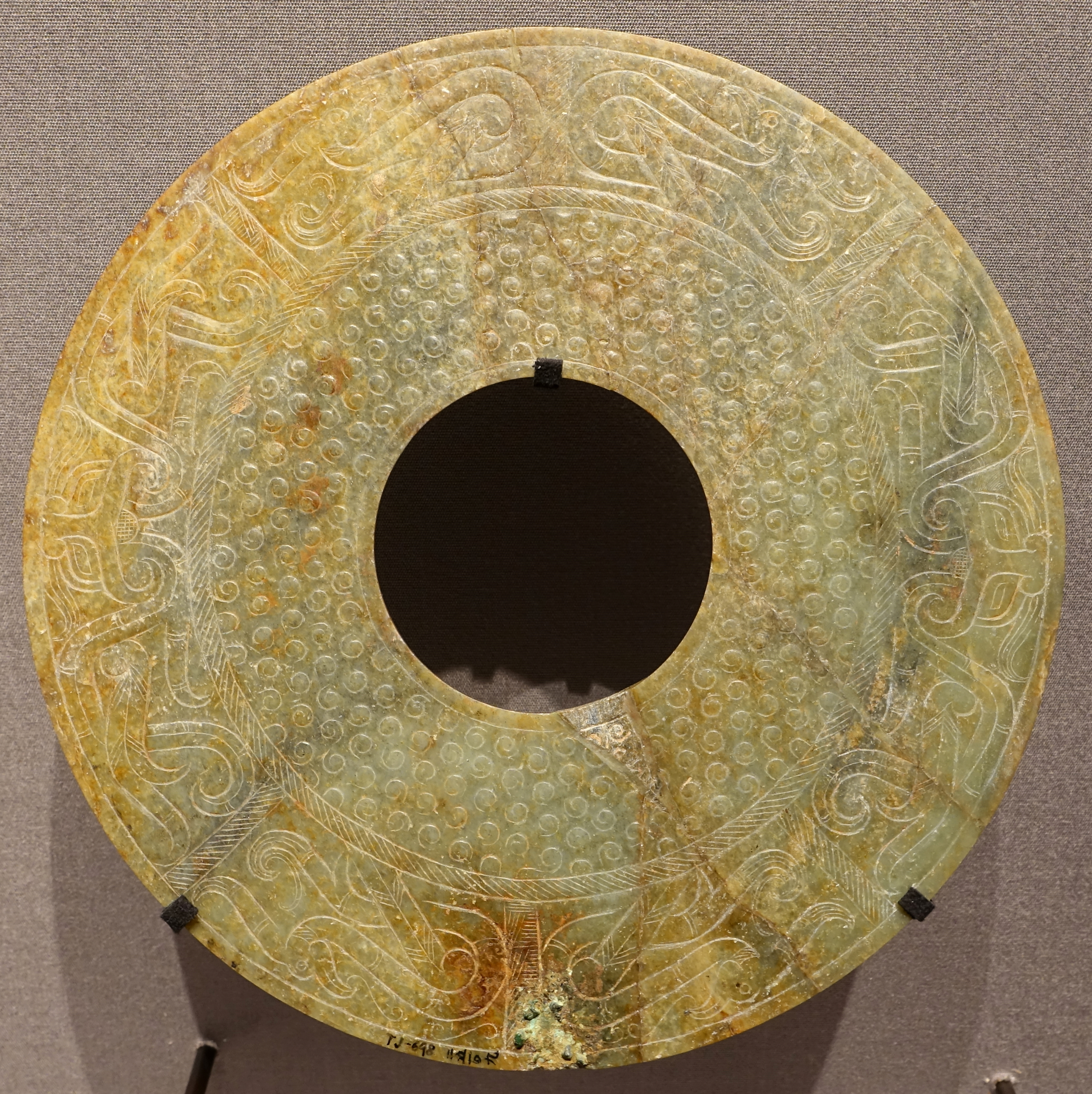
Bi jade-disk with dragon designs, 4th–2nd century BCE.

Many Chinese classics refer to the Marquis of Sui's pearl in context with other legendary gems, jades, and swords associated with the ceremonial regalia of ancient Chinese states.

Suíhóuzhū (隨侯珠, "the Marquis of Sui's pearl") has a literary synonym Suíhóuzhīzhū (隨侯之珠) with the Classical Chinese grammatical possessive affix zhī (之). Suí (隨, lit. "follow; pursue; comply with; adapt to") is the name of a small ancient state during the Shang and Western Zhou dynasties, located in present-day Suizhou, Hubei—not to be confused with the Sui dynasty (隋, 581–618 CE). Sui was originally one of the Ji states (11th–7th centuries BCE) and became a vassal state of Chu. The rulers of Sui held the Chinese feudal title Hóu (侯), the second of five Zhou dynasty peerage ranks. This is usually translated as English "Marquis" or "Marquess", but more generally means an "honorific term applied in pre-imperial times to all rulers of states, regardless of actual rank". Alternate translations of Suihou include "Duke Sui" and "Lord Sui". Zhū (珠; "pearl; gem; bead; orb") is used in many Chinese names for shining pearls/gems, such as yèmíngzhū (夜明珠; "night-luminous pearl"), yèguāngzhū (夜光珠; "night-shining pearl"), and míngyuèzhū (明月珠; "luminous-moon pearl"), which is exemplified by Marquis of Sui's pearl.

Suihouzhu ("Marquis of Sui's pearl") frequently occurs in context with one of the most famous jades of Chinese antiquity, Héshìbì (和氏璧) or Héshìzhībì (和氏之璧), both meaning "Clan He's jade-disk".

Bian He 卞和 was a man from the late Warring States Period [8th century BCE] who came upon a stone containing a rare piece of jade. However, when he presented it to King Li of Chu, it was judged to be a fake, and he was punished by having his left foot cut off. Not deterred, Bian He presented the stone again when King Wu took the throne. It was again judged to be a fake, and Bian He suffered the loss of his right foot. He was so distraught that he withdrew to the foot of a mountain, clutching his jade, and cried until he wept blood. This so moved King Wu that he ordered the stone reexamined. When cut and polished it was shown to be a rare treasure.

When Bian He is read as a typical Chinese name, Biàn (卞; 'law', 'rule', 'impetuous', 'impatient') is the surname and Hé (和; "harmonious; agreeable; comfortable") is the given name. However, He is also an uncommon surname and early texts refer to Bian He as both Bianshi (卞氏; "(of) Bian clan") and Heshi (和氏; "(of) He clan"), with the word shì (氏; "clan; family; [a suffix after surnames]"). Bì (璧; "carved jade-disk with a round hole in center") is an ancient Chinese artifact, which first became important grave goods in the Liangzhu culture (3400–2250 BCE). Bi were "often used ceremonially as symbolic of a covenant or guarantee, as between persons, states, heaven and a dynastic house, etc.".

Tài'ē or Tài'ā (太阿) is the name of a legendary 5th century BCE sword. The master bladesmith Ou Yezi made three iron swords for King Goujian (r. 496–465 BCE) of Yue, named Lóngyuān (龍渊; "Dragon Gulf"), Tài'ē (泰阿; "Great Riverbank"), and Gōngbù (工布; "Artisanal Display"). Master Ou described the patterning on Tai'e to the king, "it is majestic and vigorous, like the waves of a flowing river".

== Mythology ==
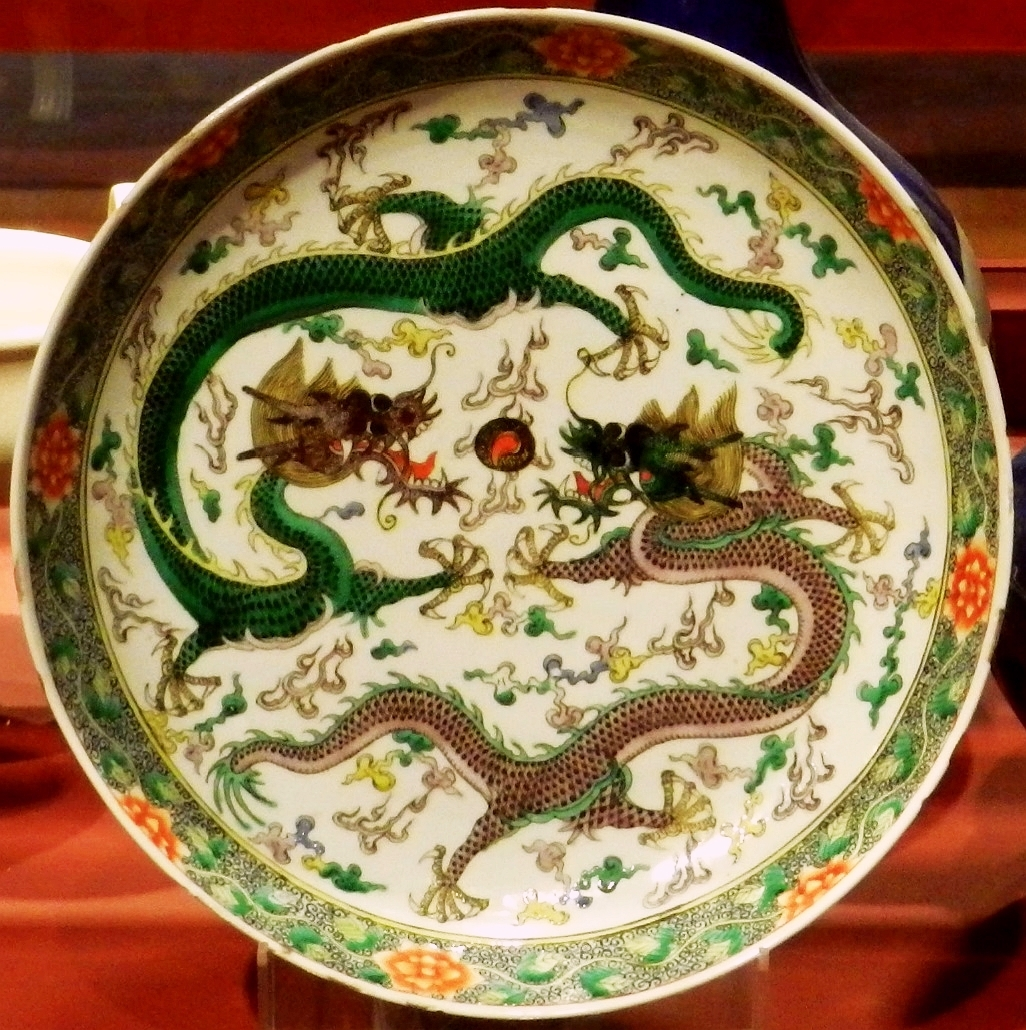
Qing dynasty plate with two dragons and a flaming pearl.

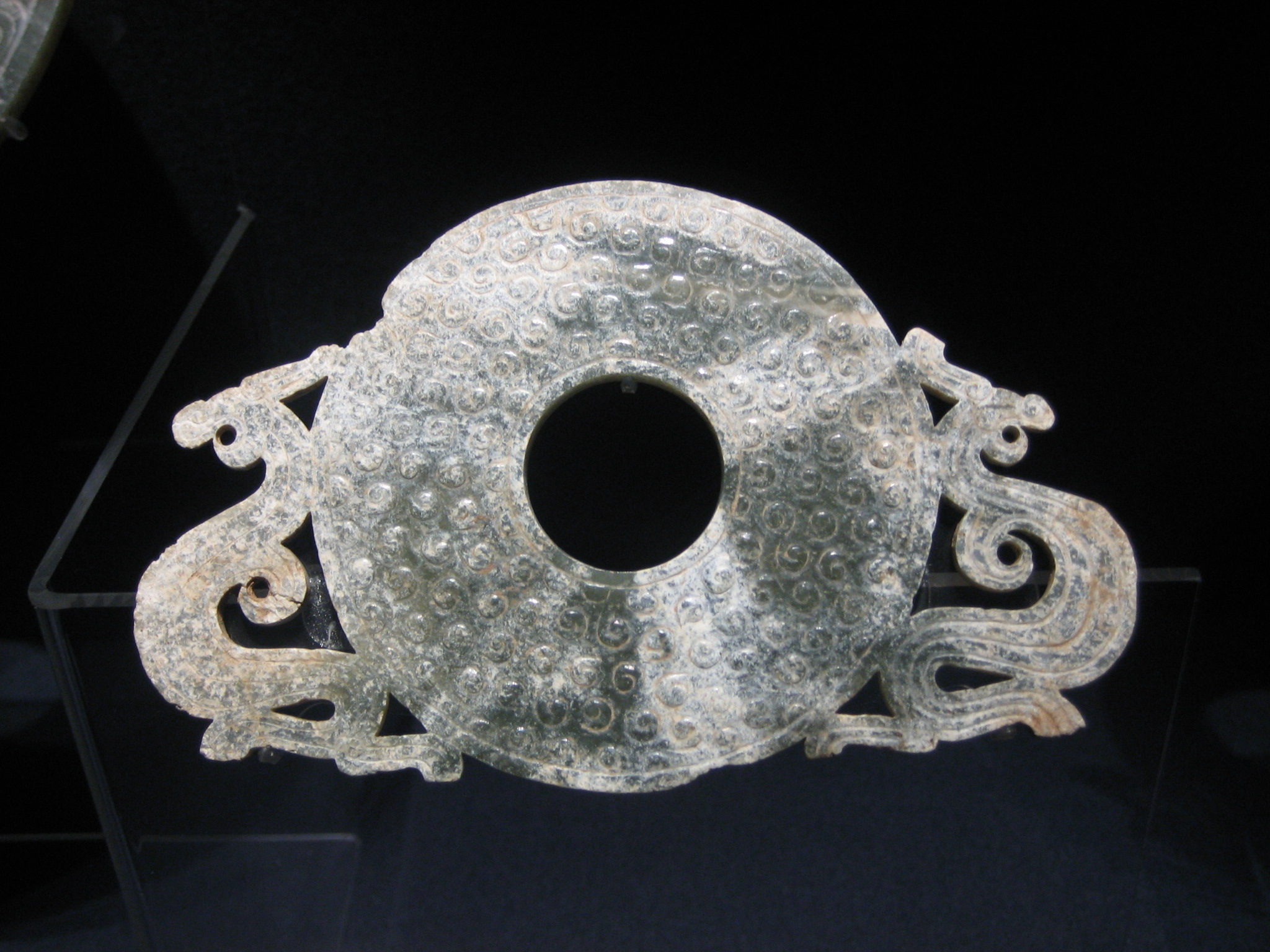
Bi jade-disk with a dual dragon motif, Warring States period.

Chinese mythology and folklore associate snakes with dragons. Marquis of Sui's snake with a glowing pearl in its mouth is echoed in later Chinese depictions of dragons with a flaming pearl or gem under their chin or in their claws. According to the German anthropologist Wolfram Eberhard, the long dragon symbolizes clouds and rainstorms, and when it plays with a ball or pearl, this signifies the swallowing of the moon by the clouds or thunder in the clouds. The moon frequently appears as a pearl, and thus the dragon with the pearl is equal to the clouds with the moon. The pearl-moon relationship is expressed in the ancient belief that at full moon pearls are solid balls and at new moon they are hollow. Li Shizhen's 1578 Bencao Gangmu pharmacopeia describes a shenlong Divine Dragon holding in its mouth leizhu (雷珠; "thunder pearls/beads") that would "light the entire house at night".

In some later iterations of the Marquis of Sui's theme, the grateful snake kills its benefactor. For instance, the Chinese folktale of "The Greedy Minister and the Serpent" concerns a schoolboy who found a snake egg and lovingly cared for his pet serpent until he was a young man preparing to take the imperial examination in the capital. He asked the snake for a present in exchange for his kindness and it spat up a huge pearl that brightly shone in the dark. After receiving the highest jinshi degree in the exam, the man was appointed to a prestigious position, but he was dissatisfied and cunningly presented his marvelous pearl to the emperor, who was so delighted that he appointed him grand chancellor. Yet the covetous minister still wanted more wealth, so he went into the mountains where the snake lived, and demanded more pearls, whereupon the snake opened its mouth wide and swallowed him (cf. Bashe).

Legends about animals that carry a marvelous jewel either in their forehead or in their mouth are found almost worldwide. In only a relative few of these legends is the stone luminous, this variant being known in ancient Greece, India, Ceylon, and Armenia; see luminous gemstones for details.

In Western mythology and folklore, there is a theme of injured animals presenting magical gems out of gratitude to people who helped them. This is a subcategory of the "Grateful Animals" folktale motif (ATU 554). The Chinese Warring States period legend of the Marquis of Sui's pearl is the earliest known example of a Grateful Animal story about repaying a debt in gratitude to a human being.

== Early textual references ==
Numerous Warring States period (c. 475–221 BCE) and Han dynasty (206 BCE – 220 CE) texts mention Marquis of Sui's pearl as a metaphor for something important or valuable, but without reference to the grateful snake tale, which implies that it was common knowledge among contemporary readers. The following textual examples are in roughly chronological order, and limited to texts with reliable English translations.

=== Chunqiu ===
The c. 5th-century BCE Chunqiu (Spring and Autumn Annals) official history of Lu state and its c. 4th century BCE Zuo zhuan commentary mentions two unnamed marquises of Sui in 706 to 690 and 537 BCE, but do not mention pearls.

The Chunqiu records that when the Zhou ruler Duke Ai of Qin (r. 536–501 BCE) was enthroned in 537, "The viscount of Chu, the marquises of Chen and Sui, and the baron of Xu, laid siege to [the capital of] Cai." The Zuo zhuan commentary suggests that the viscount had rewarded the marquis of Sui "as a peer of the kingdom" for his previous military assistance to Chu and called him "now to take the field as one of the other princes."

The Zuo zhuan also mentions an earlier marquis of Sui during the reign of Duke Huan of Lu (r. 711–694 BCE). It records that in 706 BCE King Wu of Chu ordered the sudden invasion of Sui in a scheme to prevent an alliance with the other vassal states of Chu. After peace negotiations, Chu prime minister Dou Bobi (鬬伯比) concluded that Sui might conspire against Chu, and warned the marquis "to cultivate good government, and be friendly with the States of your brother princes; then perhaps you will escape calamity." The marquis was afraid, and "attended properly to his duties of government; and Chu did not dare to attack him." In the summer of 704 BCE, after Sui failed to attend a meeting of Chu's vassal states, King Wu personally led his army in an attack on Sui and defeated them in the Battle of Suqi (速杞). After the marquis escaped, Chu captured his war-chariot and the entire chariot division, and the states came to a peace agreement. The final Zuo zhuan reference to the marquis of Sui is in 690 BCE when King Wu died during another invasion of Sui and his Chu officials "made a covenant" with the marquis.

=== Mozi ===
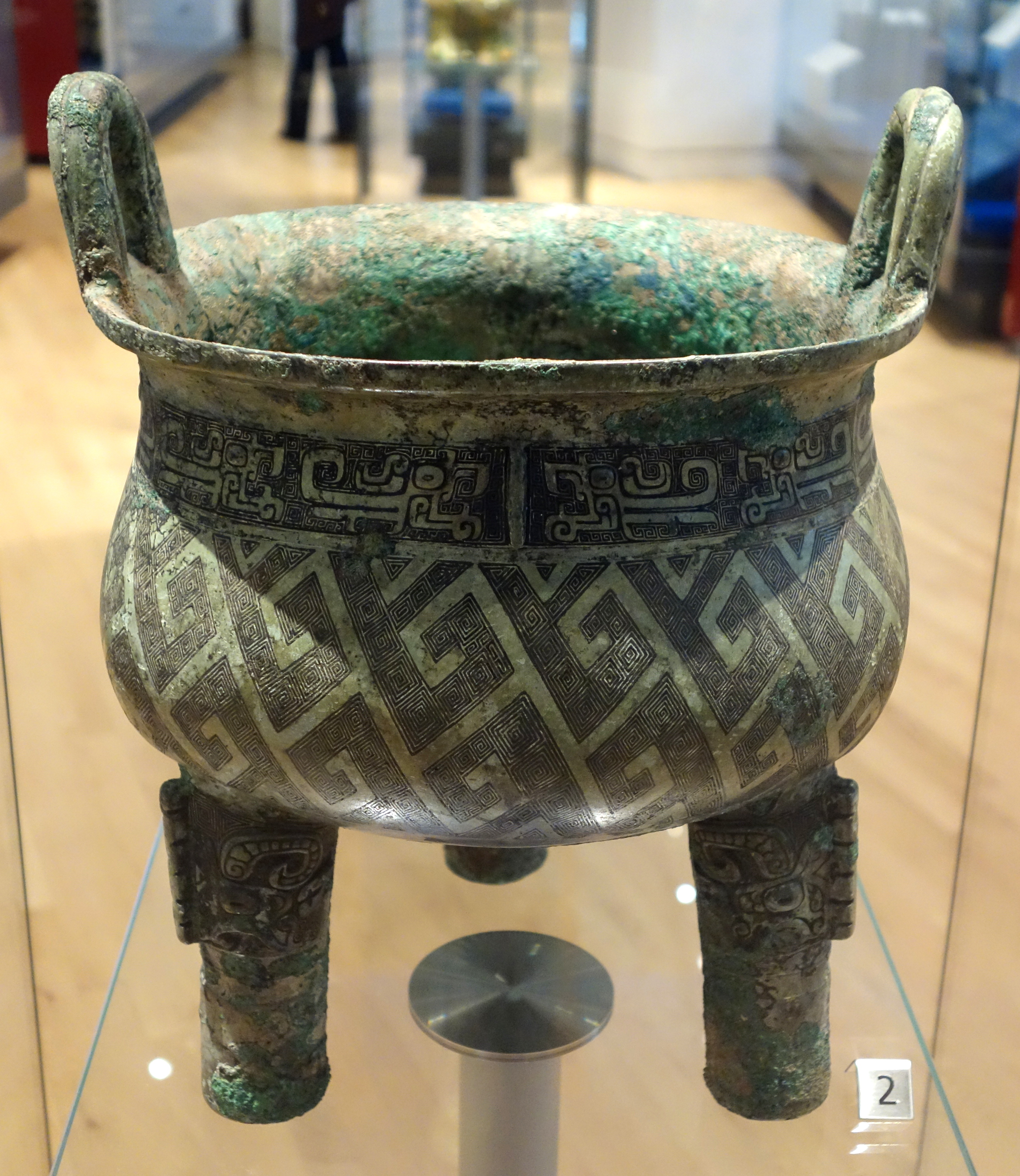
Shang dynasty (c. 1300–1046 BCE) bronze ding.

The c. 4th–3rd centuries BCE Mozi ([Sayings of] Master Mo) mentions Marquis of Sui's pearl and Mr. He's jade-disk with the legendary Nine Tripod Cauldrons, namely, a set of Chinese ritual bronze ding "tripod cauldrons", said to have been cast by mythical Yu the Great after controlling the Great Flood. In response to criticism from his disciple Wu Mazi (巫馬子) that "To leave contemporaries alone and to praise the early kings is to praise rotten bones", Mozi (c. 470–391 BCE) explains how a state's yi ("righteousness; justice") is more important its ritual treasures.

Motse said: The jade of Ho, the pearl of Duke Sui, and the nine tings—these are what the feudal lords value as excellent treasures. Can they enrich the country, multiply the people, put the government in order, and place the state in safety? Of course they cannot. Excellent treasures are to be valued for their efficacy. Now since the jade of Ho, the pearl of Duke Sui, and the nine tings cannot benefit men, then they are not the excellent treasures in the world. On the other hand, if righteousness is employed in the government of the state the population will be increased, the government will be in order, and the state will be secure. The excellent treasures are to be valued for their efficacy. Now righteousness can benefit men. So then righteousness is the excellent treasure of the world. (Chapter 11)

=== Zhanguo ce ===
The 3rd-century BCE Zhanguo ce (Strategies of the Warring States), which is a compendium of political and military anecdotes dating from 490 to 221 BCE, mentions Marquis of Sui's pearl along with an otherwise unknown treasure, the Chiqiu zhi huan (持丘之環; "Chiqiu jade bracelet/armband"). King Wuling of Zhao (r. 325–299 BCE) summoned Zheng Tong (鄭同) for an audience and asked how to avoid warfare with neighboring feudal states. Zheng replied,

Well, let us suppose there is a man who carries with him the pearl of Sui-hou [隨侯之珠] and the Ch'ih-ch'iu armband [持丘之環] as well as goods valued at ten thousand in gold. Now he stops the night in an uninhabited place. [Since he has neither weapons nor protectors,] It is clear he will not spend more than a night abroad before someone harms him. At the moment there are powerful and greedy states on your majesty's borders and they covet your land. ... If you lack weapons your neighbours, of course, will be quite satisfied.

=== Lüshi Chunqiu ===
The c. 239 BCE Lüshi Chunqiu (Master Lü's Spring and Autumn Annals) is an encyclopedic text compiled under the patronage of the Qin dynasty Chancellor Lü Buwei. This book and the Zhuangzi have almost identical descriptions of using the marquis of Sui's pearl as a crossbow pellet in order illustrate foolishly losing much and gaining little.

As a general principle, whenever a sage is about to initiate anything, he is certain to consider carefully how his means relate to what he hopes to achieve. Now if a man were to use the pearl of the Marquis of Sui [隨侯之珠] as a pellet to shoot at a sparrow a thousand yards up in the air, the world would surely ridicule him. Why is that? Because what he used as shot was so valuable, while what he wanted was so trifling. And, surely, life is much more valuable than the pearl of the Marquis of Sui!

=== Zhuangzi ===
The c. 3rd–1st centuries BCE Daoist Zhuangzi ([Writings of] Master Zhuang) reiterates the story of shooting at a distant sparrow with the marquis's pearl.

Whenever the sage makes a movement, he is certain to examine what his purpose is and what he is doing. If now, however, we suppose that there was a man who shot at a sparrow a thousand yards away with the pearl of the Marquis of Sui [隨侯之珠], the world would certainly laugh at him. Why is this? It is because what he uses is important and what he wants is insignificant. And is not life much more important than the pearl of the Marquis of Sui?

Comparing these four matching sentences in the Lüshi Chunqiu and Zhuangzi, the first sentence is identical in both versions. The Zhuangzi adds one more character in the second and five more in the third, while the Lüshi Chunqiu has one more character in the fourth sentence.

=== Chuci ===
The c. 3rd–1st century BCE Chuci (Songs of Chu) poetry anthology collectively refers to Marquis Sui's pearl and Bian He's jade-disk (Suihe 隨和), and to the Tai'e sword. The "Quenching the Light" poem begins,

Woe and alas! my heart within is torn.
The winter heliotrope is dead, its leaves and stems blighted.
Shards and stones are prized as jewels, Sui and He rejected [捐棄隨和].
The leaden knife is praised for sharpness, Tai E discarded as blunt.
The thoroughbred droops his ears; for a long time now no one has used him.
A lame ass draws the chariot and stumbles half-way up the hill.
The pure are in hiding; the favoured are fools.
The phoenix may not soar; but quails vaunt their flight.

Four other Chuci poems mention Bian He's jade-disk. For example, "Disgust with the World" includes him in a list of rulers who rejected loyal people, "And I grieve, too, for Bian He, the man of Chu [悲楚人之和氏兮]: / The jade he presented was judged worthless stone. / Both King Li and King Wu refused to examine it, / And he ended with both his feet cut off for his pains."

=== Huainanzi ===
King Liu An's c. 139 BCE Huainanzi ([Writings of the] Masters of Huainan) philosophical compendium has four contexts referring to the Marquis of Sui's pearl, three of which also refer to Mr. He's jade-disk using the names Heshi (和氏; "Mr. He") or Heshi (咼氏; "Mr. He", using an uncommon variant character), and Bianshi (卞氏; "Mr. Bian").

"A Mountain of Persuasions" chapter mentions marquis Sui's legendary pearl twice with Mr. He's jade-disk. The former explains the essence of Chinese jade.

When a piece of jade is moistened, it looks bright. [When struck], its sound is slow and harmonious. How expansive are its aspects! With no interior or exterior, it does not conceal its flaws or imperfections. Close up, it looks glossy; from a distance, it shines brightly. It reflects like a mirror revealing the pupil of your eye. Subtly it picks up the tip of an autumn hair. It brightly illuminates the dark and obscure. Thus the jade disk of Mr. He [和氏之璧] and the pearl of the marquis of Sui [隨侯之珠] emerged from the essence of a mountain and a spring. When the Superior Man wears them, he complies with their purity and secures his repose. When lords and kings treasure them, they rectify the world. (Chapter 16)

The latter says understanding is more important than wealth, "Acquiring an army of ten thousand men does not compare to hearing one word that is apposite; / Acquiring the pearl of the marquis of Sui [隨侯之珠] does not compare to understanding from whence events arise. / Acquiring the jade disk of Mr. Gua [咼氏之璧] does not compare to understanding where events will lead" (Chapter 16).

Two other chapters figuratively use the legendary gems. One as a simile for someone who has attained the Tiandao (天道; "Way of Heaven"), "It is like the pearl of Marquis Sui [隨侯之珠] / or the jade disk of Mr. He [和氏之璧] / Those who achieved it became rich / those who lost it became poor" (Chapter 6). The other advises, "With a rhinoceros and a tiger behind you and the pearl of the marquis of Sui [隨侯之珠] in front of you, do not try to grab [the pearl]. First avoid the calamity, and then go for the profit" (Chapter 17).

=== Shiji ===
The Han dynasty historiographer Sima Qian's c. 94 BCE Shiji (Records of the Grand Historian) records the Marquis of Sui in the House of Chu genealogy, an episode which is not mentioned in the Zuo zhuan above. "In the fifty-first year (690 B.C.), Chou summoned the Marquis of Sui, reproving him for causing Ch'u to be established as a kingdom. The King of Ch'u was angry and, thinking that Sui has turned its back on him, launched a punitive expedition against Sui. King Wu expired in the midst of his army and the troops were dismissed" (Chapter 40).

The biography of Qin dynasty Grand chancellor Li Si (c. 280–208 BCE) collectively mentions Sui He zhi bao (隨和之寶; "treasures of [Marquis] Sui and [Mr.] He") in a letter advising Emperor Qin Shi Huang not to follow Zheng Guo's advice to expel foreigners from Qin.

Now Your Majesty imports jade from the Kun Mountains and possesses the treasures of Sui and He. Dangling moon-bright pearls [明月之珠], you buckle on the sword Taia, are drawn by fine steeds like Xianli, set up phoenix banners blazoned with kingfisher feathers, and employ drums of sacred lizard skin. Not one of these various precious things is a product native to Qin, and yet Your Majesty takes joy in them. Why? If something must be a product of Qin before it can be acceptable, then no night-shining jewels [夜光之璧] would adorn the court chambers, no vessels of rhinoceros horn or elephant tusk would amuse and delight you, no women of Zheng and Wey would throng the harem, and no fine horses and spirited thoroughbreds would fill your stables. The gold and tin from south of the Yangtze could not be utilized, the vermilion and blue of Shu could not be used for pigment. (Chapter 87)

The Shiji biography of the Han political advisor Zou Yang (鄒陽; c. 206–129 BCE) refers to the Suihouzhizhu and Yeguangzhibi (夜光之璧; "night-glowing jade ring") as valuable gems that could be overlooked unless they were examined.

A twisted tree with gnarled roots, bent and bulging with not one straight twig may become the vessel of a ten-thousand chariot state. Why is this? Because it was first polished by [the ruler's] attendants. Thus when something arrives without notice, even though one might be giving away the Marquis of Sui's pearl [隨侯之珠] or a glowing jade ring [夜光之璧], one will acquire resentment and be accorded no gratitude. When men speak of one beforehand, one can establish such a merit with a wilted tree and a shrived stump that none will forget it. (Chapter 83)

=== Shuo yuan ===
The Shuo Yuan (Garden of Stories), which the historian and bibliographer Liu Xiang (77–6 BCE) compiled from early sources, quotes Mozi (cf. above) using Marquis of Sui's pearl in a conversation against ostentation with his disciple Qin Guxi (禽滑釐), called Qinzi (Master Qin), who asked about using embroidered silks and fine linens. Mozi said, "Suppose that in a year of bad times, someone wished to give you the pearl of the Marquis of Sui [隨侯之珠], yet would not allow you to sell it, but only to keep it as a valuable decoration. Or that he wished to give you a chung [zhōng (鍾; "cup")] of grain. If you would get the pearl you would not get the grain, and vice versa. Then which would you choose?" Qinzi answered that he would choose the grain that could rescue him from extremity. Mozi replied, "Truly so. So then why strive after lavishness? The Sage does not hasten to exalt what is without use and to delight in frivolity and licence."

=== Lunheng ===
The skeptical philosopher Wang Chong's c. 80 CE Lunheng (Balanced Discourses) has a passage contrasting genuine gemstones found in nature with artificial ones made by Daoist waidan alchemists, and it uses the ambiguous phrase suihou yi yao zuo zhu (隨侯以藥作珠), which can be literally translated "the Marquis of Sui made pearls from chemicals", or contextually translated "by following proper timing (i.e. when to begin heating and how long to go on) pearls can be made from chemicals". Chinese scholars traditionally interpreted this suihou as "Marquis of Sui", who was famous for the grateful snake's luminous pearl, yet the Lunheng is the only early text that claims that he made imitation pearls. Some modern sinologists familiar with early Chinese alchemy and glass production, such as Joseph Needham and Wang Ling, interpret suihou as an "old alchemical pun" meaning "following the [fire-]times", reading sui in its basic meaning "follow; comply with" and hóu (侯; "marquis") as a phonetic loan character for hòu (候; "time; wait; situation"), denoting the term huǒhou (火候; "fire-times; times when heating should begin and end"), which were "both ancient and important in Chinese alchemy." The Cantong qi uses Yijing hexagrams to express alchemical "fire-times".

This Lunheng context contrasts two genuine/artificial pairs: first jades and pearls as gemstones, then yangsui ("burning lenses") and brightly polished swords as fire starters. Compare the following English translations.

The laws of Heaven can be applied in a right and in a wrong way. The right way is in harmony with Heaven, the wrong one owes its results to human astuteness, but cannot in its effects be distinguished from the right one. This will be shown by the following. Among the Tribute of Yü are mentioned jade and white corals. These were the produce of earth and genuine precious stones and pearls. But the Taoists melt five kinds of stones, and make five-coloured gems out of them. Their lustre, if compared with real gems, does not differ. Pearls in fishes and shells are as genuine as the jade-stones in the Tribute of Yu. Yet the Marquis of Sui made pearls from chemicals [隨侯以藥作珠], which were as brilliant as genuine ones. This is the climax of Taoist learning and a triumph of their skill. By means of a burning-glass one catches fire from heaven. Of five stones liquefied on the Ping-wu day of the 5th moon an instrument is cast, which, when polished bright, held up against the sun, brings down fire too, in precisely the same manner as, when fire is caught in the proper way. Now, one goes even so far as to furbish the crooked blades of swords, till they shine, when, held up against the sun, they attract fire also. Crooked blades are not burning-glasses; that they can catch fire is the effect of rubbing. Now, provided the bad-natured men are of the same kind as good-natured ones, then they can be influenced, and induced to do good. Should they be of a different kind, they can also be coerced in the same manner as the Taoists cast gems, Sui Hou made pearls [隨侯之所作珠], and people furbish the crooked blades of swords. Enlightened with learning and familiarized with virtue, they too begin by and by to practise benevolence and equity. (Chapter 8)

In the Tao of Heaven there are genuine [真; zhen] things and counterfeit [偽; wei] things; the true things are firm in their correspondence with Heaven's naturalness; the artificial things are due to human knowledge and art—and the latter are often indistinguishable from the former. The Tribute of Yu (chapter of the Shu Ching) speaks of bluish jade [璆琳; qiulin] and [琅玕; langgan] (possibly agate, ruby, or coral). These were the products of the earth, and genuine like jade and pearls. But now the Taoists melt and fuse [消爍; xiaoshuo] five kinds of minerals and make 'jade' of five colours out of them. The lustre of these is not at all different from that of true jade. Similarly, pearls from fishy oysters are like the bluish jade of the Tribute of Yu; all true and genuine (natural products). But by following proper timing (i.e. when to begin heating and how long to go on) pearls can be made from chemicals [藥; yao], just as brilliant as genuine ones. This is the climax of Taoist learning and a triumph of their skill. Now by means of the burning-mirror [yangsui] one catches fire from heaven. Yet of five mineral substances liquefied and transmuted on a [bingwu] day in the fifth month, an instrument [器; qi] is cast, which, when brightly polished and held up against the sun, brings down fire too, in precisely the same manner as when fire is caught in the proper way. Indeed, people go so far now as to furbish up the curved blades of swords, so that when held against the sun they attract fire also. Though curved blades are not (strictly speaking) burning mirrors, they can catch fire because of the rubbing to which they have been subjected.

=== Soushen ji ===
Although a post-Han text, the imperial historian Gan Bao's c. 350 CE Soushen Ji (In Search of the Supernatural) has two interesting stories about grateful animals presenting luminous pearls/gems. The first involves a black crane; according to legend, when a crane has lived a thousand years it turns blue after another thousand it turns black and is called a xuanhe (玄鶴; "dark crane").

Kuai Shen [噲參] was the most filial son to his mother. Once a black crane was injured by a bow hunter and in its extremity, went to Kuai. The latter took it in, doctored its wound, and when it was cured set it free. Soon afterwards the crane showed up again outside Kuai's door. The latter shone a torch to see out and discovered its mate there too. Each of them held a single night-glowing pearl [明珠] in its beak to repay Kuai.

The second story is a detailed version of the Marquis of Sui's pearl.

Once upon a time, when the ruler of the old Sui kingdom was journeying, he came upon a great wounded serpent whose back was broken. The ruler believed the creature to be a spirit manifestation and ordered his physician to treat it with drugs to close up its wound. Thereafter the serpent was able to move again, and the place was called Mound of the Wounded Serpent. One year later the serpent brought a bright pearl [明珠] in its mouth to give the ruler of Sui to show its gratitude. The pearl was greater than an inch in diameter, of the purest white and emitted light like moonglow. In the dark it could illuminate an entire room. For these reasons it was known as "Duke Sui's Pearl" [隨侯珠] or the "Spirit Snake's Pearl" [靈蛇珠], or, again, the "Moonlight Pearl" [明月珠].

The French sinologist Berthold Laufer notes the remarkable Soushen ji parallels with a 3rd-century Roman legend. The c. 222 CE De Natura Animalium (On the Characteristics of Animals), compiled by Claudius Aelianus, told the story of Heraclea or Herakleis, a virtuous widow of Tarentum, who after seeing a fledgling stork fall and break its leg, nursed it back to health, and set it free. One year later, as Heraclea sat at the door of her cottage, the young stork returned and dropped a precious stone into her lap, and she put it indoors. Awakening that night, she saw that the gem "diffused a brightness and a gleam, and the house was lit up as though a torch had been brought in, so strong a radiance came from, and was engendered by, the lump of stone." Based upon the similarities within these Greek and Chinese versions of the story, even in details such as the grateful animal returning after one year, are so striking, that a "historical connection between the two is obvious."
