= Mr. He's jade =

Historic Chinese jade piece

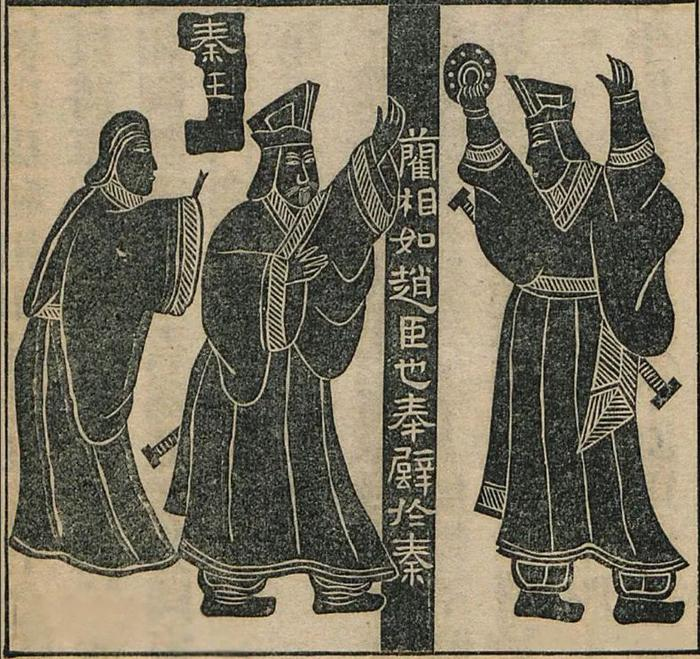
- Relief tracing of Lin Xiangru with Heshibi and King of Qin on Wu Family Shrines stone-relief, from Jinshisuo (金石索).
- Type: bi
- Material: jade
- Created: 8th-century BCE
- Present location: unknown (lost)

Mr. He's jade
- Chinese: 和氏璧
- Literal meaning: He's jade annulus
Transcriptions
Standard Mandarin
- Hanyu Pinyin: Héshìbì
- Wade–Giles: Ho^{2}-shih^{4}-pi^{4}
Yue: Cantonese
- Yale Romanization: Wòhsihbīk
- Jyutping: Wo^{4}si^{6}bik^{1}

The Heshibi, often translated as Mr. He's jade, was a sacred ceremonial bi disk, also known as a jade annulus, which had an important role in Chinese history. First appearing during the mid–8th century BCE, it was cut into a ritual bi and recognized as an imperial treasure. The Heshibi became the object of contention among the Warring States, stolen from Chu circa 4th century BCE, acquired by the Zhao, and temporarily traded to Qin in 283 BCE. When the Qin dynasty was founded in 221 BCE, the Heshibi was carved into the Heirloom Seal of the Realm, symbol of the Mandate of Heaven, and subsequently transferred through successive Chinese dynasties until it was lost during the Five Dynasties era in the 10th century.

The early historicity of the stone is uncertain, though its great antiquity seems clear. The earliest mention of it is from the 3rd century BCE. The story of its finding is likely apocryphal. Whether it was turned into the Heirloom Seal of the Realm is also a matter of dispute. If it was turned into the seal, it was certainly lost by the time of the Ming dynasty. It has been used as a metaphor for a precious object since its earliest mentions.

== Terminology ==
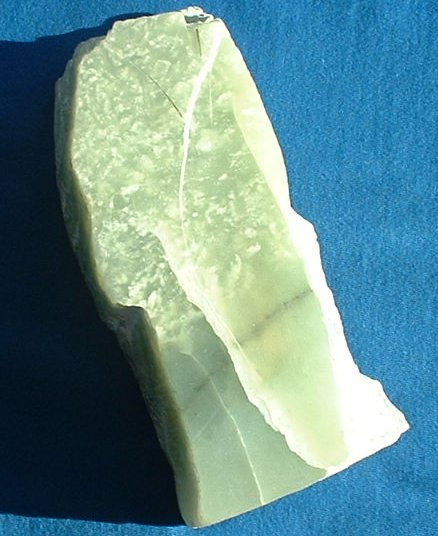
Uncut jade

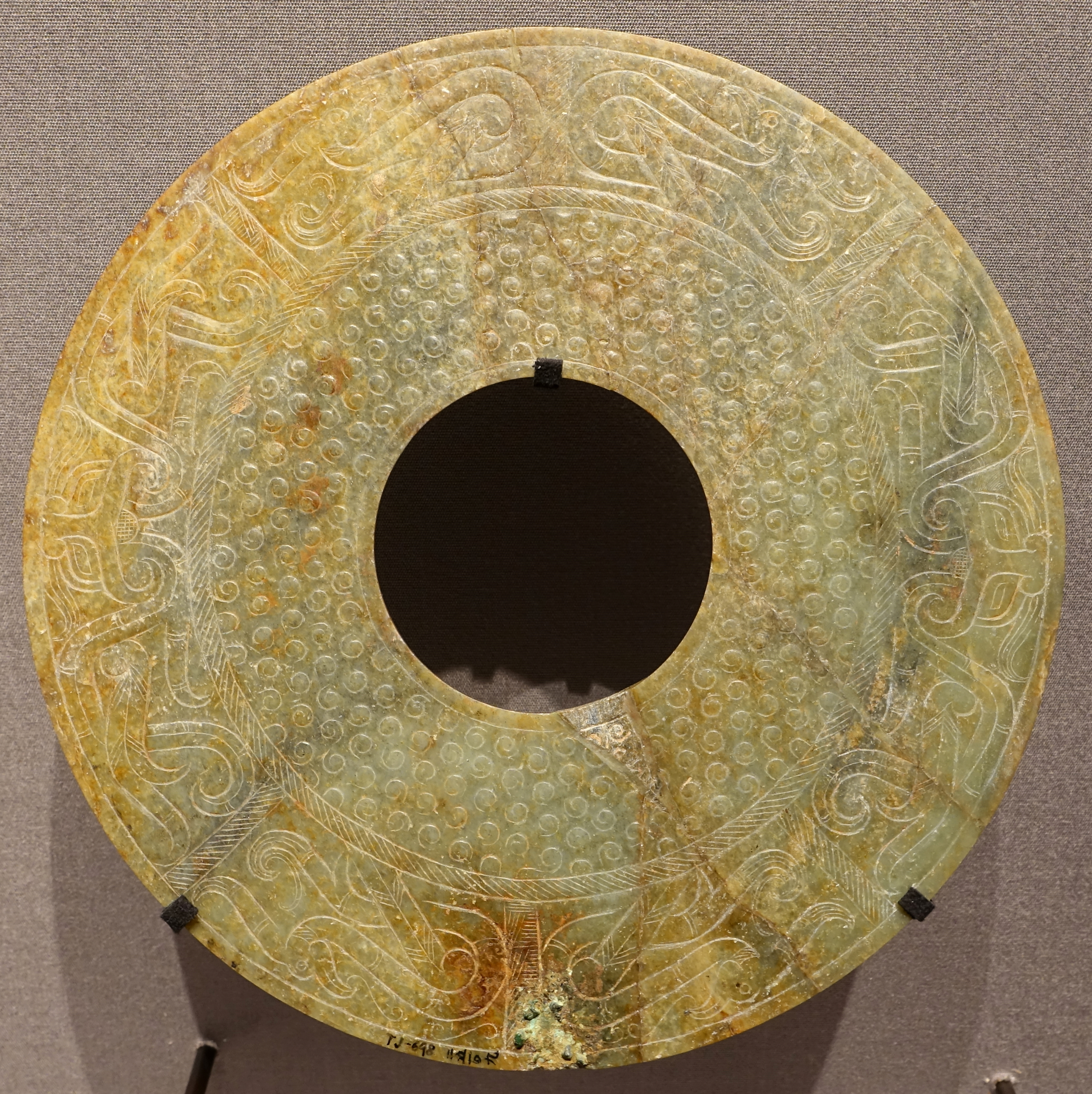
Bi jade annulus with dragon designs, 4th to 2nd century BCE

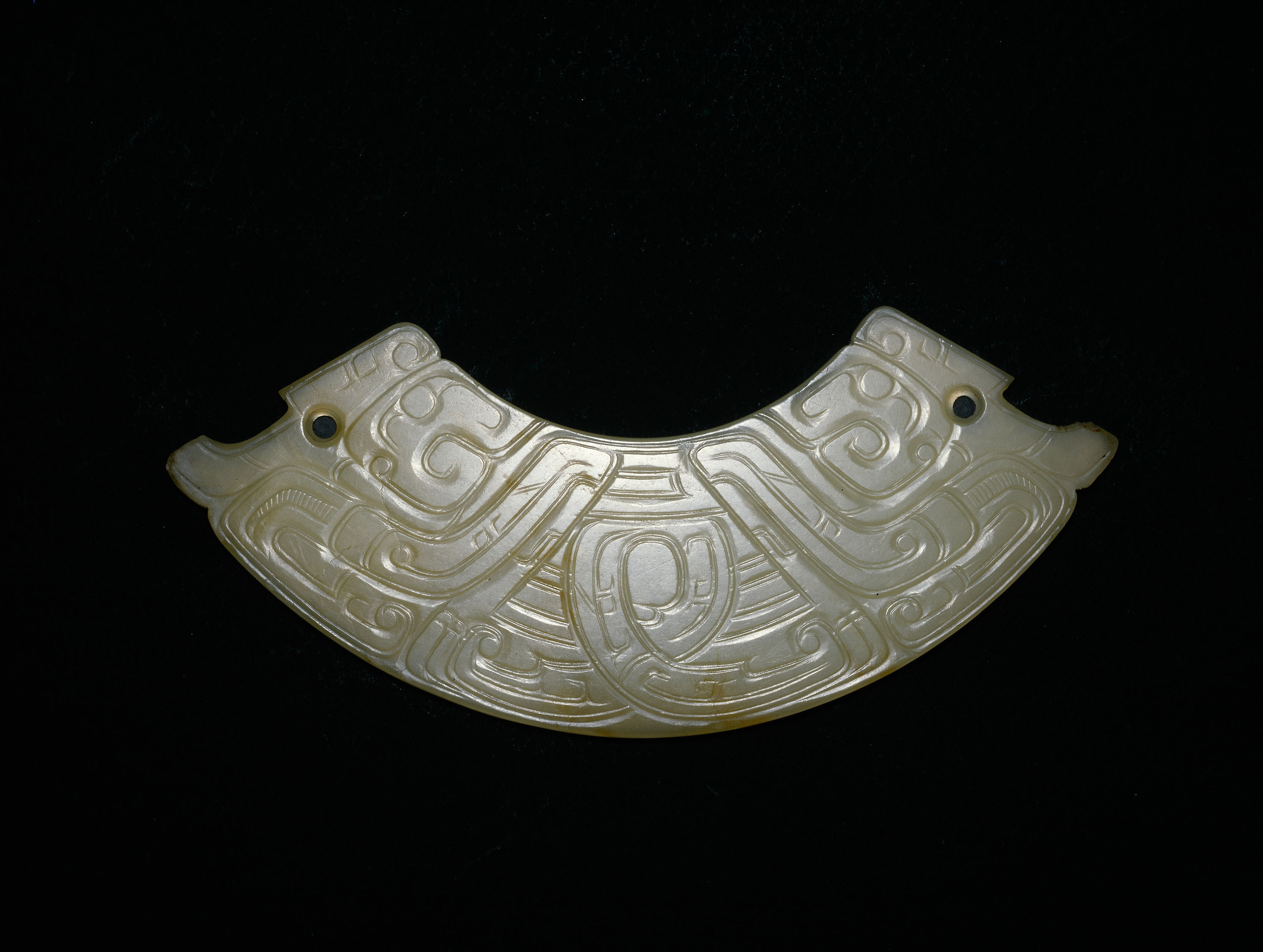
Huang semi-circular jade pendant, 9th to 8th century BCE

Héshìbì (Chinese: 和氏璧; trans. "He's jade annulus") or Héshìzhībì (和氏之璧) (using the Classical Chinese grammatical possessive affix zhī (之) was a Bì (璧; "jade annulus") or ceremonial jade annulus. Bi artifacts date back to the Liangzhu culture (3400–2250 BCE). Bi signified heavenly kingship in Zhou times, and were often used ceremonially as symbolic of a covenant or guarantee. The word can also be used to refer to jade in general. The Heshibi is named after Bian He, the person who first discovered the jade stone.

Bian He (卞和) is a Chinese name, Biàn (卞) is the surname (e.g., Bian Lan) and Hé (和) is the given name. However, He is also an uncommon surname (e.g., He Qia) and early texts refer to Bian He as both Bianshi (卞氏; "of Bian clan") and Heshi (和氏; "of He clan"), with the word shì (氏; "Chinese clan; family"). Some alternate names are Heshi (龢氏), with the ancient variant character Hé; Heshi (咼氏), with the unique variant Guō pronounced He in this name; and Jing He (荊和; "He from Jingzhou"). Most scholars translate Heshi as "Mr. He" with suffixed shi, some as "Master He", and a few literally interpret shi and translate Heshi as "He Clan" or "He family".

== Legends ==
The Chinese story of the Heshibi has been retold and developed for over two millennia.

=== Hanfeizi ===
The earliest extant account is the Heshi (和氏; "Mr. He") chapter of the classic Hanfeizi, attributed to Han Fei (c. 280–233 BC). The Hanfeizi version involves Mr. He presenting his jade to the first three "kings" of Chu state: "King Li of Chu" (楚厲王) posthumously refers to Viscount Fenmao (r. 757–741 BCE), his brother King Wu of Chu (楚武王, r. 740–690 BCE) who was the first to style himself "king", and his son King Wen of Chu (楚文王, r. 689–677 BCE). Several Hanfeizi commentaries say these three 8th-century BCE Chu rulers of Bian He should be three Zhou dynasty rulers: King Wu of Zhou (周武王, r. c. 1050–1043 BCE), his father King Wen of Zhou (周文王, r. 1100–1050), and King Cheng of Zhou (周成王, r. 1042–1021 BCE).

Once a man of Ch'u, named Pien Ho, came by an uncut jade in the Ch'u Hills. He brought it home and submitted it as a present to King Wu. Thereupon King Wu had a jeweller give an opinion of it. "It is an ordinary stone," said the jeweller. The King, regarding Ho as a liar, had his left foot cut off. Upon King Wu's death, King Wên ascended the throne, when Ho again submitted it as a present to King Wên. King Wên also had a jeweller give an opinion of it. Again he said, "It is an ordinary stone." The King, also regarding Ho as a liar, had his right foot cut off. When King Wên died and King Ch'êng ascended the throne, Ho, carrying the uncut jade in his arms, cried at the foot of the Ching Hills. After three days and three nights his tears were all exhausted and blood flowed out. At this news the King sent men out to ask him the reason, saying, "Throughout All-under-Heaven men whose feet were cut off are many. Why should you be crying so bitterly?" "I am lamenting not the loss of my feet," said Ho in reply, "but for the calling a precious gem an ordinary stone and for their dubbing an honest man a liar. This is the reason why I am lamenting." Meanwhile, the King had a jeweller polish up the jade and got the treasure out at last. So it was designated "the Jade of Pien Ho" [和氏之璧].

The subsequent Hanfeizi context criticizes contemporary rulers and recommends that a wise person who hopes to avoid punishment should not present a ruler any "uncut jewels of wisdom and statecraft".

Joseph P. Yap translates the Hanfeizi story with the three Chu kings Li, Wu, and Wen.

At around 8th century BCE, Bian He a jeweller from the kingdom of Chu discovered a piece of stone; he knew from experience that it was a piece of priceless jade. He presented the piece of stone to King Li of Chu, (757–741 BCE). The king thought the jeweller was trying to deceive him and had his left foot chopped off as a punishment. When the next king, King Wu of Chu (r. 740–691 BCE) ascended to the throne, Bian He again presented the piece of stone to the new king; this time, the king had his right foot chopped off as he also maintained that the jeweller was trying to deceive him. Bian He embracing his piece of stone cried for three days and three nights at the foothills of Jingshan Mountain. Much later, when King Wen of Chu (r. 690–675 BCE) ascended the throne the king sent someone to ask the jeweller why he was so adamant about his belief. He answered, 'This is a piece of priceless jade, and the two former kings regarded it as a useless piece of stone. I am not saddened by the loss of my feet, but I am distressed by the fact that a patriot is misconstrued as being wicked and evil." [The king] then asked a jade expert to cut open the stone, and it transpired that it was indeed a piece of priceless jade. Legend has it that it was pure white and flawless. The king of Chu named it Heshibi, Master He's jade.

=== Gao's Huainanzi commentary ===
The next significant version of Pian He's story is found in Gao You's 212 CE Huainanzi commentary for the passage (below) that compares the Way of Heaven with the Marquis of Sui's pearl and the Heshibi. Gao changes the original three Chu kings state to the three Zhou kings.

A man from Ch'u named Pien Ho found a piece of unpolished jade at the foot of the Ching Mountains. He offered it as tribute to King Wu [of the Chou dynasty]. King Wu had it inspected by a jade expert, who declared it to be ordinary stone. [Pien Ho] had his left leg cut off [as punishment]. When King Wen came to the throne, [Pien Ho] once more presented the jade. King Wen took it to be ordinary stone, and [Pien Ho] had his right leg cut off. Pien Ho wrapped the jade carefully and wept tears of blood. When King Ch'eng ascended the throne, Pien Ho once again presented the jade. King Ch'eng said: 'Dear sir, you disregard having your legs cut off, as long as you can have your jade piece cut up for examination.' As soon as the stone was cut, it appeared that it was truly fine jade, and it was made into a jade [annulus] (pi).

== History ==
Beginning with the Zhanguo ce and Shiji, many Chinese histories have discussed the Heshibi, but the early historicity remains uncertain.

=== Zhanguo ce ===
The 3rd-century BCE Zhanguo ce (Strategies of the Warring States), which is a compendium of political and military anecdotes dating from 490 to 221 BCE, relates that the Heshibi was a national treasure of Chu, stolen from the Prime Minister, and eventually obtained by Zhao state.

King Wei of Chu (r. 339–329 BCE) bestowed the priceless jade upon Prime Minister Zhao Yang (昭陽) in gratitude for his defeat of the Yue kingdom in 333 BCE. On one occasion, Zhao Yang displayed the jade for his guests at a banquet when someone started a commotion, and in the midst of the confusion, the jade annulus disappeared. The School of Diplomacy political strategist Zhang Yi (fl. 328–309 BCE) was accused as the thief, and Zhao Yang had him questioned under torture before he was released. After this incident, the whereabouts of the jade was lost until it resurfaced at Zhao.

Chapter 250 of the Zhanguo ce records how another School of Diplomacy strategist Su Qin (380–284 BCE) persuaded Li Yu (李兌), the Chancellor of Zhao, to provide the Heshibi in order to acquire funding for the Vertical Alliance of six states against Qin. During their first audience, Su Qin convincingly explained his Vertical Alliance strategies to Li Yu and said, "You killed your ruler, [i.e., King Wuling of Zhao], and you extirpated his kin, and find your position in the empire as perilous as though you were perched atop a pile of eggs. If you heed my plans you will live; if you heed them not you will die." After Li told Su to return on the next day for an audience, one of his attendants said Su's "arguments and their scope are beyond you. Will you be able to do as he advises?" Li replied that he could not and followed the attendant's suggestion that he plug up his ears in order to avoid listening to Su's rhetoric. Su Qin persuasively spoke for the entire day during the second audience with Li. When the attendant escorted him out, Su asked "A day ago I spoke only crudely and your ruler was moved. Today I spoke in detail and he was not. Why?" "Your plans are great and their scope is lofty, sir", replied the attendant. "My lord cannot use them, so I asked him firmly to stop both his ears so that he would not heed what was said. However, come again on the morrow and I will ask that the Master be well rewarded." During the final audience, Li Yu gave Su Qin "a moon pearl [秦明月之珠], the Jade of Ho [和氏之璧], a black sable coat and a hundred pieces of pure gold." Thus, Su got the wealth he needed in order to go westward into Qin state.

=== Shiji ===
The Han dynasty historiographer Sima Qian's c. 94 BCE Shiji (Records of the Grand Historian) relates the history and background of Hr. He's jade annulus in two biographies.

==== Lin Xiangru ====
The Shiji "Biographies of Lian Po and Lin Xiangru" section records a famous story. In 283 BCE, King Zhaoxiang of Qin (r. 306–251 BCE) schemed to obtain Mr. He's jade annulus – this is the first recorded usage of modern term Heshibi 和氏璧 without classical zhi 之—from King Huiwen of Zhao (r. 298–266 BCE) – and deceitfully offered to trade away a large portion of Qin territory for the jade. However, when Xiangru discovered that Zhaoxiang never intended to give away Qin land, he tricked the king and managed to return the jade annulus back to Zhao.

"During the time of King Huiwen, Zhao [趙] acquired Chu's Jade of the Ho Clan [楚和氏璧]. King Zhao [昭] of Qin heard of this and sent a messenger to deliver a letter to the King of Zhao, saying that he wished to offer fifteen walled cities in exchange for the jade annulus [願以十五城請易璧]." The King of Zhao was distrustful and told his advisors "If we give it to Qin, we most likely will not obtain Qin’s cities, but will only be cheated. If we do not give it, then we must fear the arrival of Qin’s soldiers." The king sought the opinion of Lin Xiangru, who said, "Qin is mighty and Zhao is weak, you must grant his request." The king replied, "If he takes my jade, but gives us no cities, what then?" Lin said, "If Qin seeks the jade with its cities and Zhao does not accede, the fault lies with Zhao. If Zhao gives Qin the jade and Qin does not give Zhao the cities, the fault lies with Qin. In weighing these two measures, it would be better to accede, and lay the fault on Qin." Xiangru agreed to undertake the mission to Qin, and promised the king, "If the cities are granted to Zhao, the jade will remain in Qin; if the cities are not granted, allow your servant to return to Zhao with the jade intact." When Lin Xiangru arrived in the Qin capital, he respectfully presented the jade to King Zhaoxiang with both hands. The king was delighted and "passed it around to his Beauties and courtiers, who all shouted 'Long live the King!'" When Xiangru realized that the King of Qin had no intention of honoring the agreement, he came forward and said, "The jade has a flaw. Allow me to show it to Your Majesty." The king handed him the jade, and Xiangru retreated and stood with his back to a pillar. With his "hair bristling against his hat in rage," he threatened to destroy the jade. "It seems to me that Your Majesty has no intention of giving the King of Zhao the cities owed him. Thus I have reclaimed the jade. If you must press me, Great King, my head and the jade will both shatter against this pillar!" Since the King of Qin feared the jade would be demolished, he apologized and said, "The fifteen cities from here on will be given to Zhao." Concluding that Zhao would never acquire the Qin cities, Xiangru then told the king, "The jade of the Ho Clan [和氏璧] is a treasure that the entire world has transmitted with reverence." He then falsely said that before the King of Zhao sent off the jade, he fasted and purified himself for five days, and convinced the King of Qin that he too needed to fast for five days, after which, "your servant would dare to offer up the jade." The king agreed, and while he was fasting, Xiangru arranged for his retainer to disguise himself as a commoner, conceal the jade, and safely smuggle it back to Zhao.

After the King of Qin had finished fasting and purification, he held a ritual ceremony in his court. When Lin Xiangru arrived, he confessed having secretly sent the jade back to Zhao and then insulted the king's ancestors: "Out of the twenty odd lords of Qin since Duke Mu 穆 (r. 659–621 B.C.), not one has honored his agreements and oaths. Your servant truly feared he would be cheated by Your Majesty and thus betray Zhao." Xiangru told the enraged king that he would willingly accept the Qin death penalty for deceiving a king, and requested the pēng (烹; "death by boiling") punishment. Although some of the courtiers wanted to boil Xiangru immediately, the King of Qin said, "If We kill Xiangru now, We still cannot acquire the jade, and it would ruin the good relations between Qin and Zhao. It would be better to treat him with great civility instead, then send him back to Zhao." After Xiangru had returned, the King of Zhao praised the skillful diplomacy of his mission to Qin, and appointed him Senior Grand Master. (Chapter 81) (Note: Wade-Giles changed to Pinyin romanization.)

This story is the source of the Chinese idioms jiàzhíliánchéng (價值連城; 'as valuable as multiple cites') meaning "invaluable; priceless" and wánbìguīzhào (完璧歸趙; 'return the whole jade annulus to Zhao') meaning "to return something intact to its rightful owner".

==== Li Si ====
The Shiji biography of Qin dynasty Grand chancellor Li Si (c. 280–208 BCE) collectively mentions Sui He zhi bao (隨和之寶; "treasures of [Marquis] Sui and [Mr.] He") in a letter advising Emperor Qin Shi Huang not to follow Zheng Guo's advice to expel all foreigners from Qin.

Now Your Majesty imports jade from the Kun Mountains and possesses the treasures of Sui and He [隨和之寶]. Dangling moon–bright pearls [明月之珠], you buckle on the sword Taia, are drawn by fine steeds like Xianli, set up phoenix banners blazoned with kingfisher feathers, and employ drums of sacred lizard skin. Not one of these various precious things is a product native to Qin, and yet Your Majesty takes joy in them. Why? If something must be a product of Qin before it can be acceptable, then no night–shining jewels [夜光之璧] would adorn the court chambers, no vessels of rhinoceros horn or elephant tusk would amuse and delight you, no women of Zheng and Wey would throng the harem, and no fine horses and spirited thoroughbreds would fill your stables. The gold and tin from south of the Yangtze could not be utilized, the vermilion and blue of Shu could not be used for pigment. (Chapter 87)

=== Imperial seal of China ===
ln 228 BCE, Qin overwhelmed the kingdom of Zhao and seized the Heshibi from King Dai of Zhao. In 221 BCE, the Qin kingdom had conquered all six Warring States and Qin Shi Huangdi founded the Qin dynasty. The emperor ordered that the Heshibi jade annulus be carved into his imperial jade seal that read, "Having received the Mandate from Heaven, may (the emperor) lead a long and prosperous life." (受命於天既壽永昌). The Qin Chancellor Li Si wrote this inscription in Seal script characters and Sun Shou (孫壽) carved them into the jade.

This Qin dynasty jade seal came to symbolize the Mandate of Heaven, and beginning when the last Qin ruler Ziying handed it over to Emperor Gaozu of Han in 206 BCE, it was successively passed on to later dynastic emperors signifying the right to govern the Chinese world. The Heirloom Seal of the Realm was lost sometime between the Tang and Ming dynasties.

Another version of the legend claims that it was interred in the burial crypt of the first Emperor of Qin Shi Huangdi and the jade seal which was passed on for over one thousand years was another piece of jade from Lantian.

The China Daily writes that the Heshibi and the Heirloom seal have been conflated, and considers the Heshibi to be a legend.

== Literature ==
The jade annulus of Mr. He was mentioned in numerous classical Chinese texts, and present day Sinophones know the story from traditional chengyu idioms, such as wánbìguīzhào (完璧歸趙; 'return the whole jade annulus to Zhao') means "to return something intact to its rightful owner". The following literary examples are divided between using the Heshibi as a trope for something valuable or using it with other legendary treasures such as the Marquis of Sui's pearl.

=== Heshibi as a single treasure ===
The c. 239 BCE Lüshi Chunqiu (Master Lü's Spring and Autumn Annals) is an encyclopedic text compiled under the patronage of the Qin dynasty Chancellor Lü Buwei. The Mengdong (孟冬; "Almanac for the First Month of Winter") writes Mr. He (龢氏) with an early variant character.

Now, if one were to show a child a hundred pieces of gold and a ball of glutinous millet, the child would surely take the millet. If one were to show an ignorant person the jade disc of the He family [龢氏之璧] and a hundred pieces of gold, the ignorant man would surely take the gold. If one were to show a worthy man a jade [annulus] of the He family and the most perfect teachings concerning the Dao and its Power, the worthy man would surely take the teachings. The more refined one's knowledge, the more refined one's choices. The cruder one's knowledge, the cruder one's choices. (Chapter 10)

The preceding Lüshi Chunqiu story similarly concerns "A rustic from Song found a jade while plowing and presented it to the Director of the City Walls, [who refused it and explained] "You regard jade as a treasure, but I regard not accepting it as a treasure."

The c. 3rd–1st century BCE Chuci (Songs of Chu) poetry anthology mentions the story of Bian He several times. "Disgust with the World" includes him in a context of rulers who rejected loyal people, "And I grieve, too, for Bian He, the man of Chu [悲楚人之和氏兮] / The jade he presented was judged worthless stone [獻寶玉以為石] / Both King Li and King Wu refused to examine it / And he ended with both his feet cut off for his pains." "Reckless Remonstrance" says, "Bian He clasps his block of jade and weeps tears of blood [和抱璞而泣血兮] / Where can he find a craftsman good enough to shape it?" "Lament for the Worthy" includes Jing He in a list of loyal retainers who were mistreated, "Or Shen Sheng of Jin who met a hapless end / Or Jing He who wept tears of blood [荊和氏之泣血] / Or Shen Xu of Wu who had his eyes gouged out."

Two contexts in the c. 139 BCE Huananzi (quoted above) refer to Mr. Bian's (卞氏) jade annulus and to Mr. He (和氏) crying bloody tears. "If you understand the proper sequence of things, you will be calm. Now when it came to giving away Mr. Bian's jade annulus [卞氏之璧], when he had not yet obtained it, [Mr. Bian] was ahead. When he pleaded to present it and would not give up despite his indignation, he was behind." (Chapter 14.56) "Thus when your [views] tally with what is essential, you will value what is true and [give] equal [consideration to] the present and the ancient. If you do not have the means to heed persuasions, then you will value what has come down from the past, [simply] because it is remote. This is why [Bian] He [和氏] cried so hard that he bled at the foot of Mount Jing." (Chapter 19.7).

=== Heshibi with other treasures ===
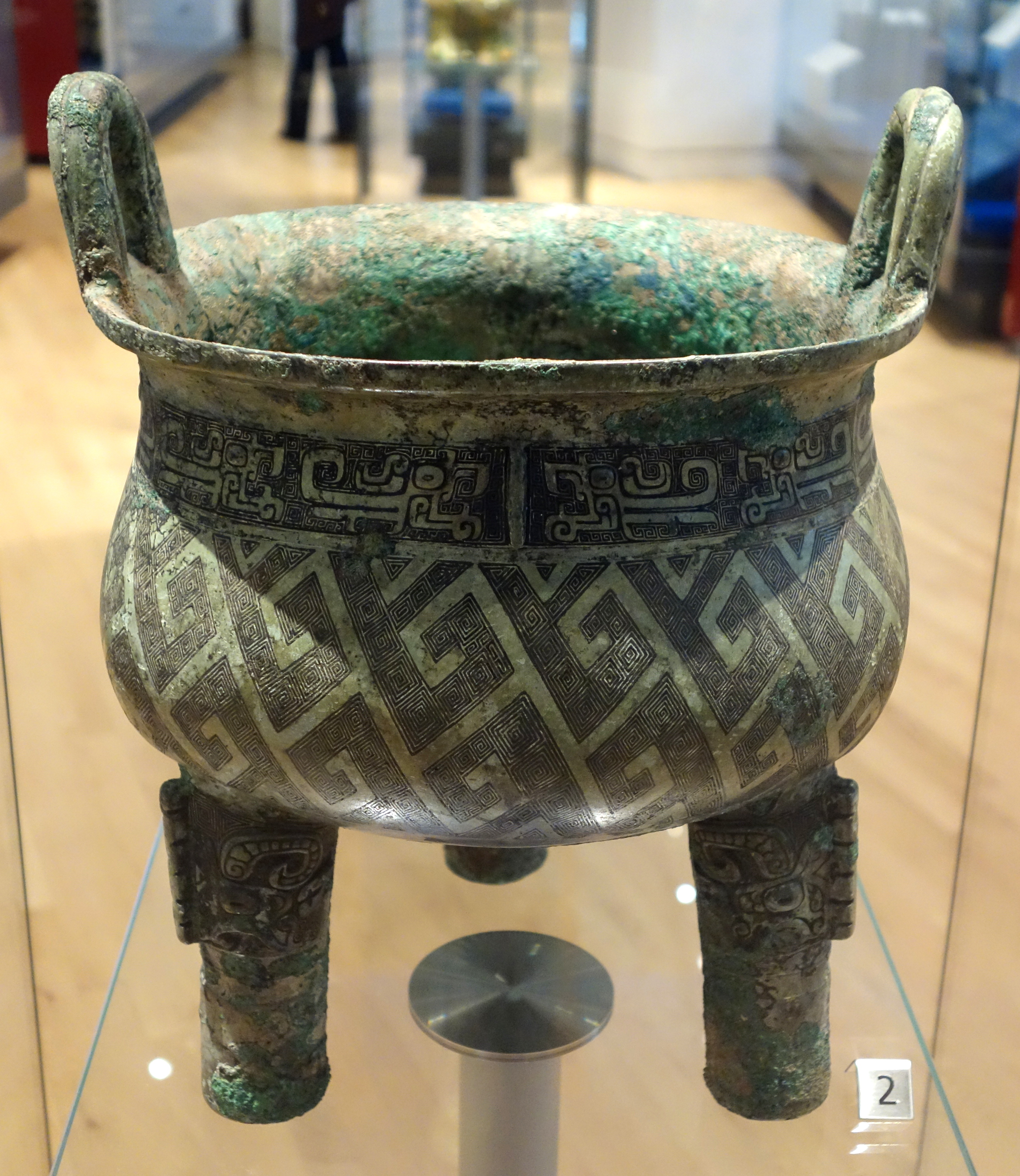
Shang dynasty (c. 1300–1046 BCE) bronze ding

The Marquis of Sui's pearl is commonly used with the Heshibi, for example, the Shiji lists "the treasures of Sui and He [隨和之寶] among Qin Shi Huangdi's imported valuables.

The c. 4th to 2nd centuries BCE Mozi ([Sayings of] Mozi) mentions them with the legendary Nine Tripod Cauldrons, namely, a set of Chinese ritual bronze ding "tripod cauldrons", said to have been cast by mythical Yu the Great after controlling the Great Flood. In response to criticism from his disciple Wu Mazi (巫馬子) that "To leave contemporaries alone and to praise the early kings is to praise rotten bones", Mozi (c. 470–391 BCE) explains how a state's yi ("righteousness; justice") is more important than the ritual "efficacy" (利; lì; "benefit; profit" of its treasures.

The jade of Ho [和氏之璧], the pearl of Duke Sui, and the nine tings—these are what the feudal lords value as excellent treasures. Can they enrich the country, multiply the people, put the government in order, and place the state in safety? Of course they cannot. Excellent treasures are to be valued for their efficacy. Now since the jade of Ho, the pearl of Duke Sui, and the nine tings cannot benefit men, then they are not the excellent treasures in the world. On the other hand, if righteousness is employed in the government of the state the population will be increased, the government will be in order, and the state will be secure. The excellent treasures are to be valued for their efficacy. Now righteousness can benefit men. So then righteousness is the excellent treasure of the world. (Chapter 11)

The 3rd-century Hanfeizi Jie Lao (解老; "Explanations of Laozi") chapter uses He's jade annulus and Sui's pearl in order to differentiate between lǐ (禮; "ritual; ceremony; good form; propriety") and wén (文; "ornamentation; embellishment; elaboration; cultured").

Propriety is the mode expressive of feelings. Embellishment is the decoration of qualities. Indeed, the superior man takes the inner feelings but leaves the outer looks, likes the inner qualities but hates the outer decorations. Who judges inner feelings by outer looks, finds the feelings bad. Who judges inner qualities by outer decorations, finds the inner qualities rotten. How can I prove this? The jade of Pien Ho was not decorated with the five bright colours [和氏之璧不飾以五采]. The bead of Marquis Sui was not decorated with yellow gold. Their qualities are so good that nothing is fit to decorate them. Verily, anything that functions only after being decorated must have poor qualities. For this reason, between father and son propriety is simple and not brilliant. Hence the saying: “Propriety is superficial semblance only.”

The c. 3rd–1st century BCE Chuci anthology collectively refers to Marquis Sui's pearl and Bian He's jade annulus as Sui He, and with the Tai'e sword. The "Quenching the Light" poem says, "Shards and stones are prized as jewels / Sui and He rejected [捐棄隨和] / The leaden knife is praised for sharpness / Tai E discarded as blunt."

King Liu An's c. 139 BCE Huainanzi (Philosophers of Huainan) philosophical compendium has five occurrences of the Heshibi, three with the Marquis of Sui's pearl, and one with the Xiahou clan's jade.

The "Surveying Obscurities" chapter figuratively uses these legendary gems as a simile for someone who has attained the Tiandao (天道; "Way of Heaven"), "It is like the pearl of Marquis Sui [隨侯之珠] / or the jade annulus of Mr. He [和氏之璧] / Those who achieved it became rich / those who lost it became poor." (Chapter 6.3). "A Mountain of Persuasions" chapter mentions the treasures of Mr. He and Marquis Sui twice. The former explains the philosophical essence of Chinese jade.

When a piece of jade is moistened, it looks bright. [When struck], its sound is slow and harmonious. How expansive are its aspects! With no interior or exterior, it does not conceal its flaws or imperfections. Close up, it looks glossy; from a distance, it shines brightly. It reflects like a mirror revealing the pupil of your eye. Subtly it picks up the tip of an autumn hair. It brightly illuminates the dark and obscure. Thus the jade [annulus] of Mr. He [和氏之璧] and the pearl of the marquis of Sui [隨侯之珠] emerged from the essence of a mountain and a spring. When the Superior Man wears them, he complies with their purity and secures his repose. When lords and kings treasure them, they rectify the world. (Chapter 16.19)

The latter compares true understanding with wealth, "Acquiring an army of ten thousand men does not compare to hearing one word that is apposite / acquiring the pearl of the marquis of Sui [隨侯之珠] does not compare to understanding from whence events arise / Acquiring the jade annulus of Mr. Gua [咼氏之璧] does not compare to understanding where events will lead." (Chapter 16.105)

The Huainanzi mentions the Heshibi along with the Xiahou clan's semi-circular jade. "As for [ritual emblems like] the jade annulus of Mr. He [咼氏之璧] and the jade half-annulus of the Xiahou clan [夏后之璜]," if [courtiers] bow courteously and advance with them, they create harmony and amity. [But] at night because of thieves, they create resentment. Such is the difference between the right time and the wrong time." (Chapter 16.90)

== Other regalia ==
Many Chinese classics refer to Bian He's jade annulus in context with other legendary gems, jades, and swords constituting the ceremonial regalia of ancient Chinese states. The most common example is Marquis of Sui's pearl, a legendary glow-in-the-dark gemstone given to the marquis by a grateful snake whose life he saved.

Other luminous gemstones frequently mentioned with the Heshibi are the Yeguangzhibi (夜光之璧; "night-shining jade annulus") and the Míngyuèzhīzhū (明月之珠; "bright-/luminous-moon pearl"). These ancient Chinese names were sufficiently well known to have been applied to foreign gemstones in the earliest accounts of Daqin (the Roman Empire). "The Kingdom of Daqin" section of the 5th-century Book of the Later Han, which was largely based on Ban Yong's report presented to Emperor An of Han in around 125, lists precious Roman trade goods including "luminous jade [夜光璧]" and "bright moon pearls [明月珠]".

The Heshibi is mentioned in the Huainanzi with the Xiahou clan's semi-circular jade pendant: Xiahoushi zhi huang (夏后氏之璜), which was a jewel supposedly included in the ducal regalia of Lu state. Xiàhòu (夏后) is a Chinese compound surname from the Spring and Autumn period (771–476 BCE), and the huáng (璜; "semi-circular jade pendant") was used for ancient ritual purposes or as a belt ornament.

Tai'e or Tai'a (太阿) is the name of a famous Spring and Autumn period iron sword that is usually considered one of the ten legendary swords of China. The legendary bladesmith Ou Yezi made three swords for King Goujian of Yue, named Tài'ē (泰阿), Lóngyuān (龍渊), and Gōngbù (工布).

== See also ==
- Heirloom Seal of the Realm
- Nine Tripod Cauldrons
