= Bian (surname) =

Family name

Bian is the romanization of several Chinese surnames, including Biàn 卞, Biān 边, Biǎn 扁, Biàn 弁, Biàn 汴, etc. Biān 边 is the most common of these names, while Biàn 卞 is the second-most common.

== Notable people named Bian ==
=== 卞 Biàn ===
It is the 86th name on the Hundred Family Surnames poem. As of 2018, it is the 269th most common surname in China.

- Bian He, discoverer of the Heshibi
- Empress Dowager Bian, wife of Cao Cao
- Empress Bian, wife of Cao Mao
- Empress Bian, wife of Cao Huan
- Bian Zhilin, poet in 20th century
- Bian Zhongyun, deputy principal beaten to death with wooden sticks by a group of students during Beijing's Red August at the beginning of the Cultural Revolution
- Bian Yingui, physicist specializing in fluid mechanics and aerodynamics
- Bian Xiaoxuan, historian in Chinese literature
- Bian Liunian, Chinese musician, composer, and musical director
- Bian Jun, former Chinese international football player
- Bian Lan, retired Chinese basketball player
- Bian Ka, Chinese shot putter
- Bian Chuxian, singer and member of SNH48's Team SII

=== 边 Biān ===
It is the 313th name on the Hundred Family Surnames poem. As of 2018, it is the 200th most common surname in China.

- Bian Zhang, official in the Eastern Han dynasty
- Queen Bian, empress of Western Qin
- Bian Hao, general of Southern Tang during the Five Dynasties and Ten Kingdoms Period
- Bian Jingzhao, painter in Ming Dynasty
- Bian Shoumin, painter in Qing Dynasty
- Bian Jinyang (边金阳; born 1993 in Heilongjiang, China) a Chinese author who published as a child
- Bian Jiang, Chinese voice actor
- Bian Hongmin, male Chinese volleyball player

=== 扁 Biǎn ===
- Bian Que (real name Qin Yueren 秦越人), earliest known Chinese physician, according to semi-legends

== See also ==
- Bianzhou, old name for Kaifeng
