= Warring States Crystal Cup =

Ancient Chinese quartz tumbler found in Zhejiang

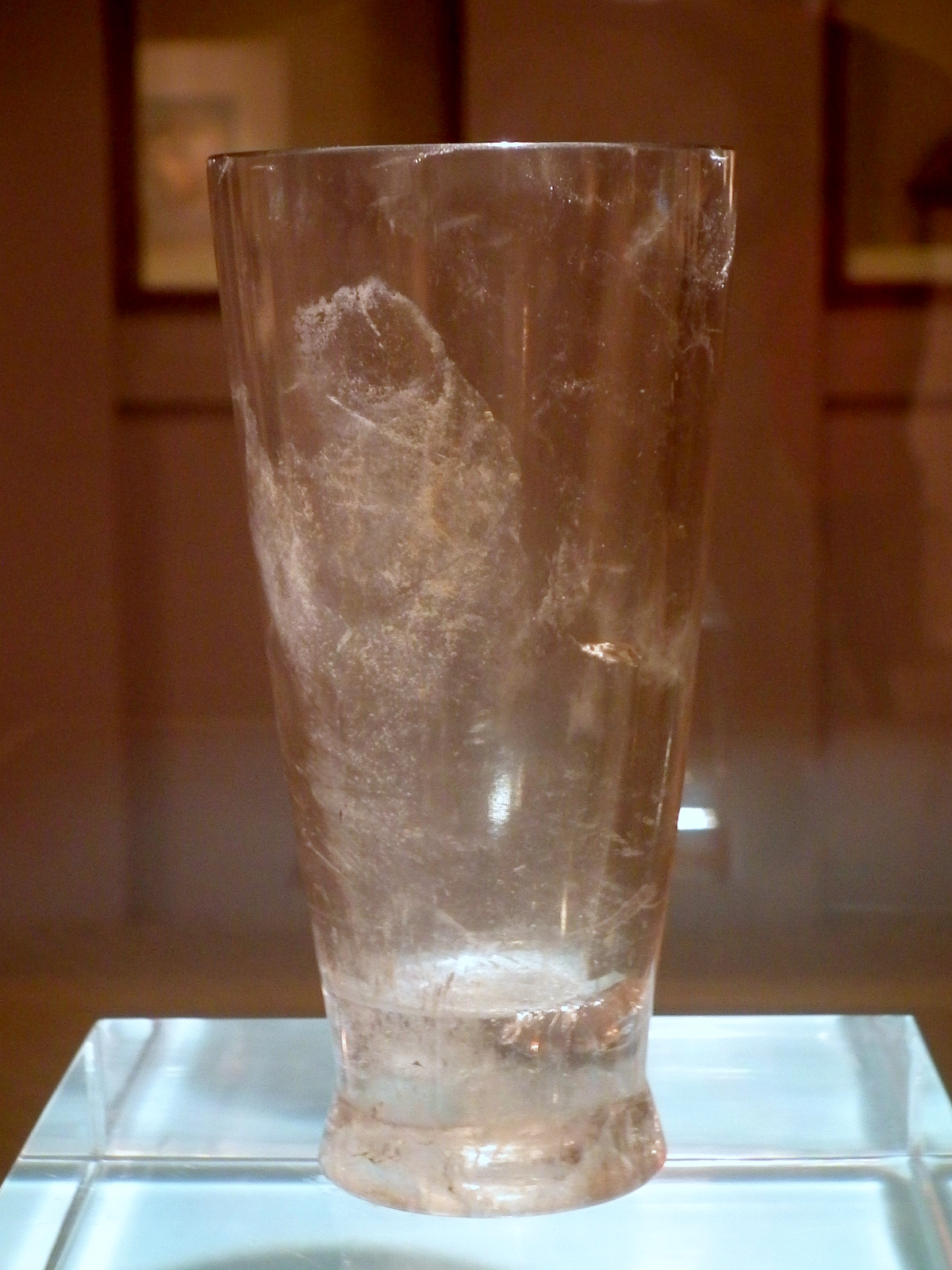
- Material: Crystal
- Height: 15.4 cm
- Discovered: 1990; Hangzhou, Zhejiang, China
- Present location: China

The Warring states crystal glass (戰國水晶杯 / 水晶杯) is a cup of a tumbler shape but carved from clear quartz (rock crystal) found in a Warring States period mausoleum tomb, dated to just before 221 BCE in the Qin dynasty.

== Dimensions ==
The cup measures 15.4 cm tall. It has a round opening and is transparent. The 'glass' is not glass, but is made from a natural high-quality crystal. The artifact is on the list of Chinese cultural relics forbidden to be exhibited abroad, a list of objects that can never leave Chinese soil.

== Discovery ==
In 1990, the cup was unearthed in Hangzhou, Zhejiang province during an archaeological dig. Specifically, it was found in Banshan town (半山鎮), Shitang village (石塘村) in a Warring states period mausoleum. It was found underground about one metre deep. Du Zhengxian (杜正賢) insisted on the archaeological digging even when other archaeologists had already labeled that area of the village a worthless wasteland. After two months of digging, he found the cup, along with other treasures. It became the biggest find of the Warring states tombs.

== See also ==
- Hardstone_carving#Asia_and_the_Islamic_world
- Chinese jade
- Ancient Chinese glass
