= Bi (jade) =

Type of circular ancient Chinese jade artifact

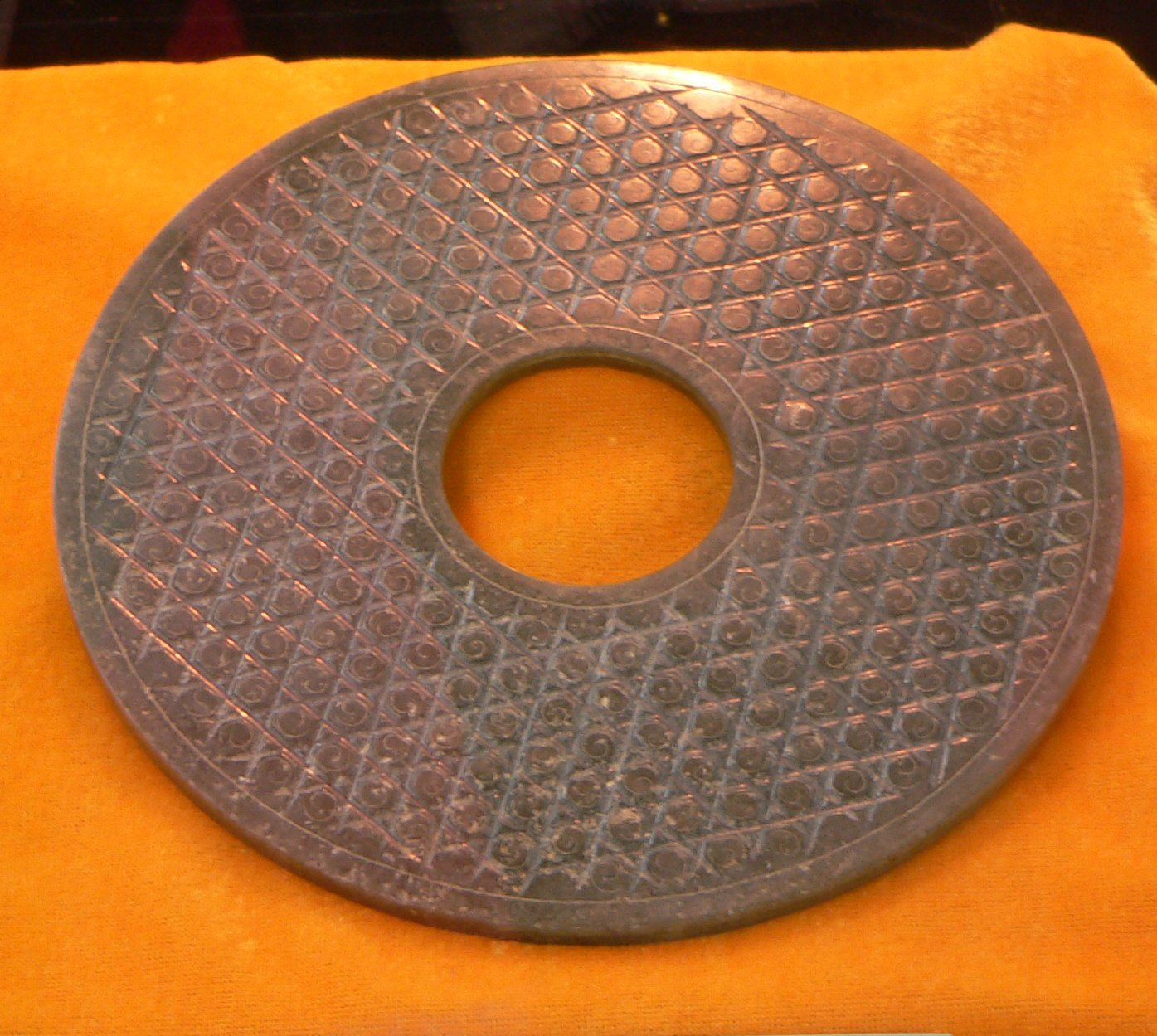
- A Han-era bi, 16 cm in diameter.
- Chinese: 璧
Transcriptions
Standard Mandarin
- Hanyu Pinyin: bì
- Wade–Giles: pi^{4}
- IPA: [pî]
Yue: Cantonese
- Yale Romanization: bīk
- Jyutping: bik1
- IPA: [pɪk̚˥]

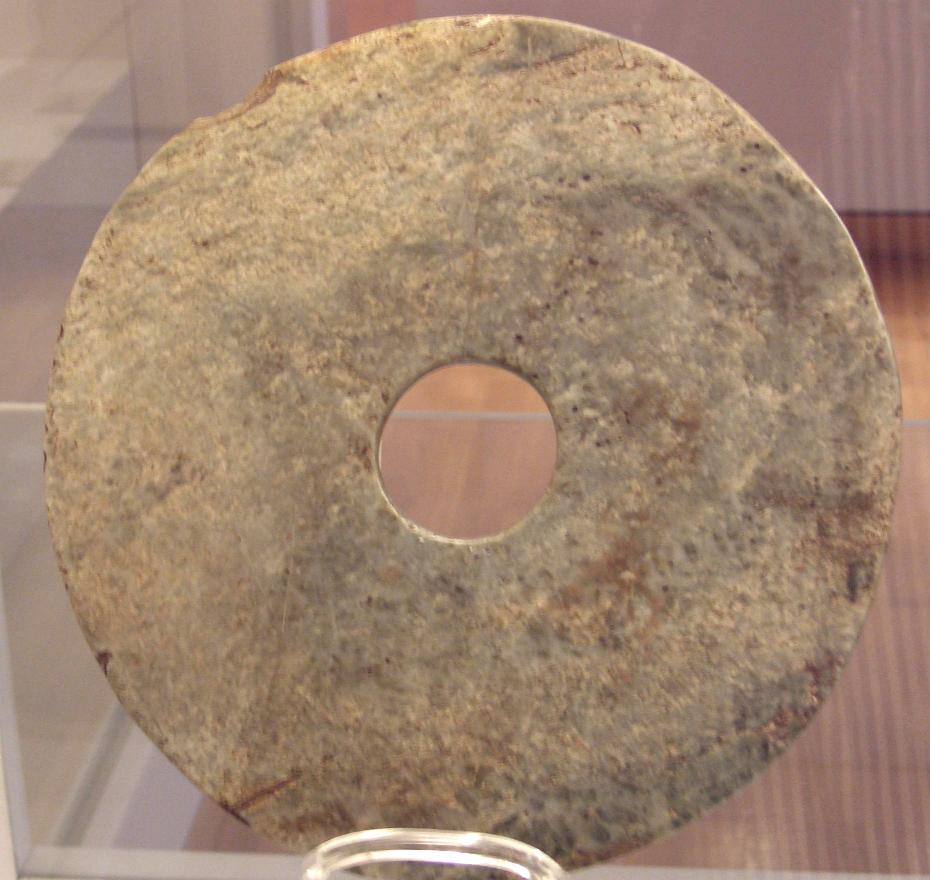
Bi disc from the Liangzhu culture (Museum Angewandte Kunst, 2006)

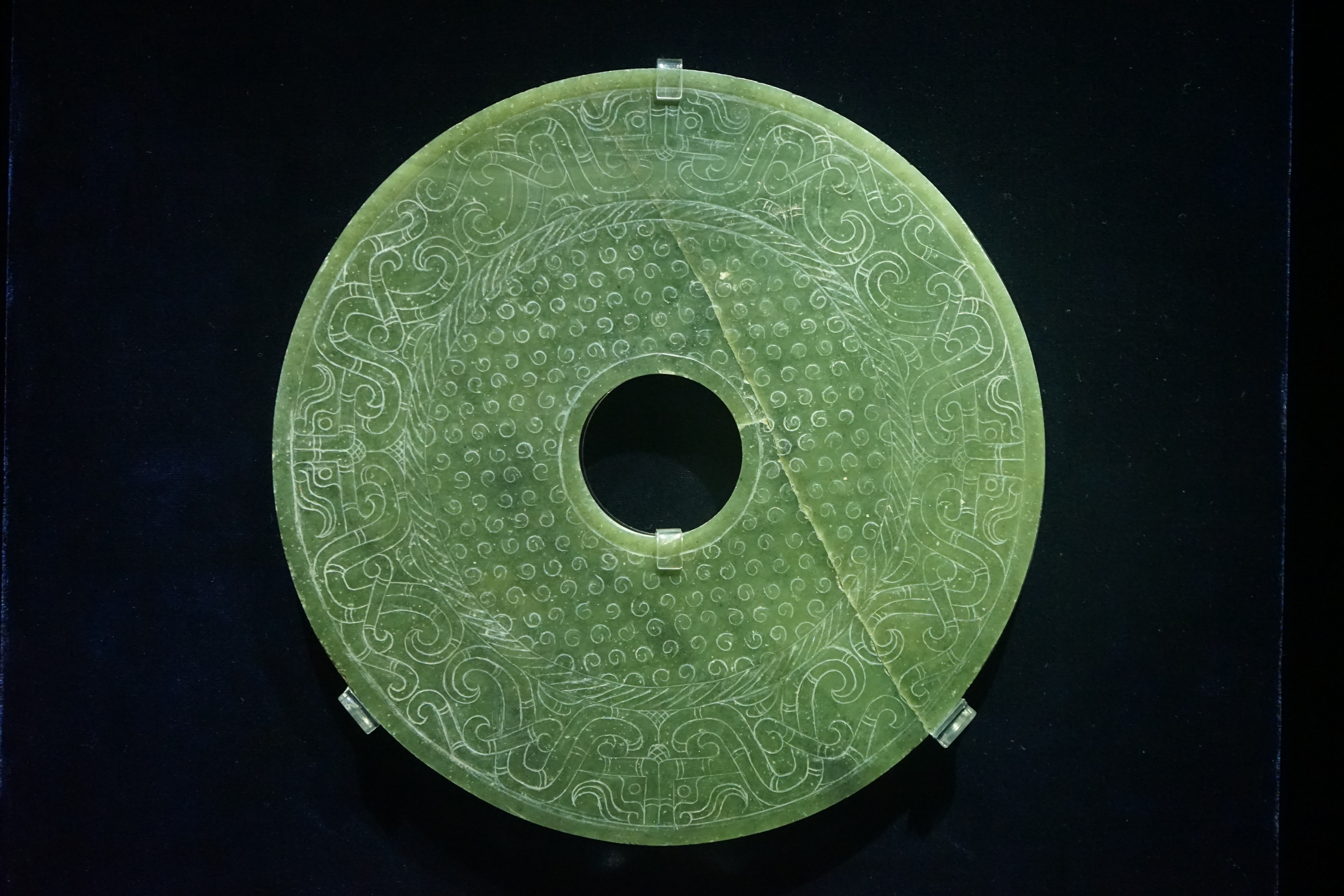
Bi with dragon designs, from the Chu King's Mausoleum at Shizishan Hill, Xuzhou

The bi (Chinese: 璧) is a type of circular ancient Chinese jade artifact. The earliest bi were produced in the Neolithic period, particularly by the Liangzhu culture (3400–2250 BCE). Later examples date mainly from the Shang, Zhou and Han dynasties. They were also made in glass.

== Description ==
A bi is a flat jade disc with a circular hole in the centre. Neolithic bi are undecorated, while those of later periods of China, like the Zhou dynasty, bear increasingly ornate surface carving (particularly in a hexagonal pattern) whose motifs represented deities associated with the sky (four directions) as well as standing for qualities and powers the wearer wanted to invoke or embody.

As laboriously crafted objects, they testify to the concentration of power and resources in the hands of a small elite.

== Meaning ==
Later traditions associate the bi with heaven, and the cong with the earth. Bi discs are consistently found with heaven and earth-like imagery, suggesting that the disk's circular shape also bears symbolic significance as this description explains:

It is found that these objects testify to early stages of development of cosmological concepts that remained important in Chinese culture during the Warring States and Han periods: the notion of a covering sky (gaitian) that revolves around a central axis, the cycle of the Ten Suns, and the use of an early form of the carpenter's square. These objects were handled by shamans who were the religious leaders of Liangzhu society and the transmitters of cosmological knowledge.

== Function ==
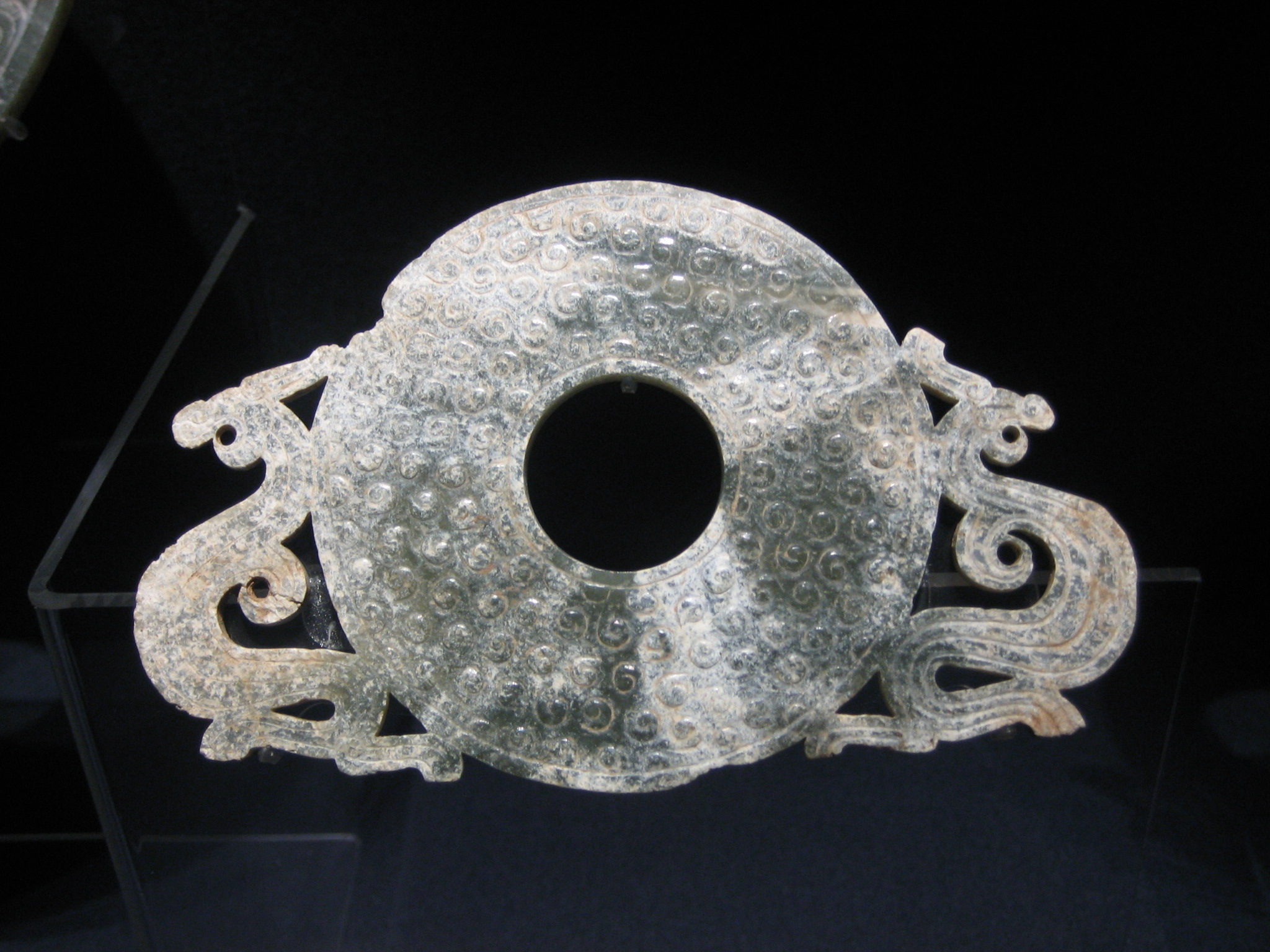
Bi disc with a dual dragon motif, Warring States period

From these earliest times they were buried with the dead, as a sky symbol, accompanying the dead into the after world or "sky", with the cong which connected the body with the earth. They were placed ceremonially on the body in the grave of persons of high social status. Bi are sometimes found near the stomach and chest in Neolithic burials.

Jade, like bi disks, has been used throughout Chinese history to indicate an individual of moral quality, and has also served as an important symbol of rank. They were used in worship and ceremony – as ceremonial items they symbolised the ranks of emperor, king, duke, marquis, viscount, and baron with four different guis and two different bi disks.

In war during the Zhou dynasty period (c. 1046–256 BCE), bi disks belonging to the leaders of the defeated forces were handed over to the victor as a sign of submission.

Scholars "are unsure of their exact use or meaning".

== Qianlong Emperor ==
In 1790 AD, the Qianlong Emperor of the Qing dynasty had an ancient bi inscribed with a message. He also wrote a poem entitled: "Verses Composed on Matching a Ding-ware Ceramic with an Ancient Jade Bowl Stand". It reads as follows: "It is said there were no bowls in antiquity / but if so, then where did this stand come from? It is said that this stand dates to later times / but the jade is antique. It is also said that a bowl called wan is the same as a basin called yu, but only differing from it in size". He also wrote: "This stand is made of ancient jade / but the jade bowl that once went with it is long gone. As one cannot show a stand without a bowl / we have selected a ceramic from the Ding kiln for it". He has also included the day, and year on the disc. The Qianlong emperor assumed the bi was a bowl stand, so he found a bowl and engraved it with messages to match the ones he engraved on the disc. This bi disc was also used for the Qianlong Emperor's funeral, and was also used for high status people's funerals as well. The bi is now kept in the British Museum's collection.

== Influences ==
The design of the reverse side of the medals given in the 2008 Summer Olympics in Beijing, China are based on bi disks.

== Gallery ==
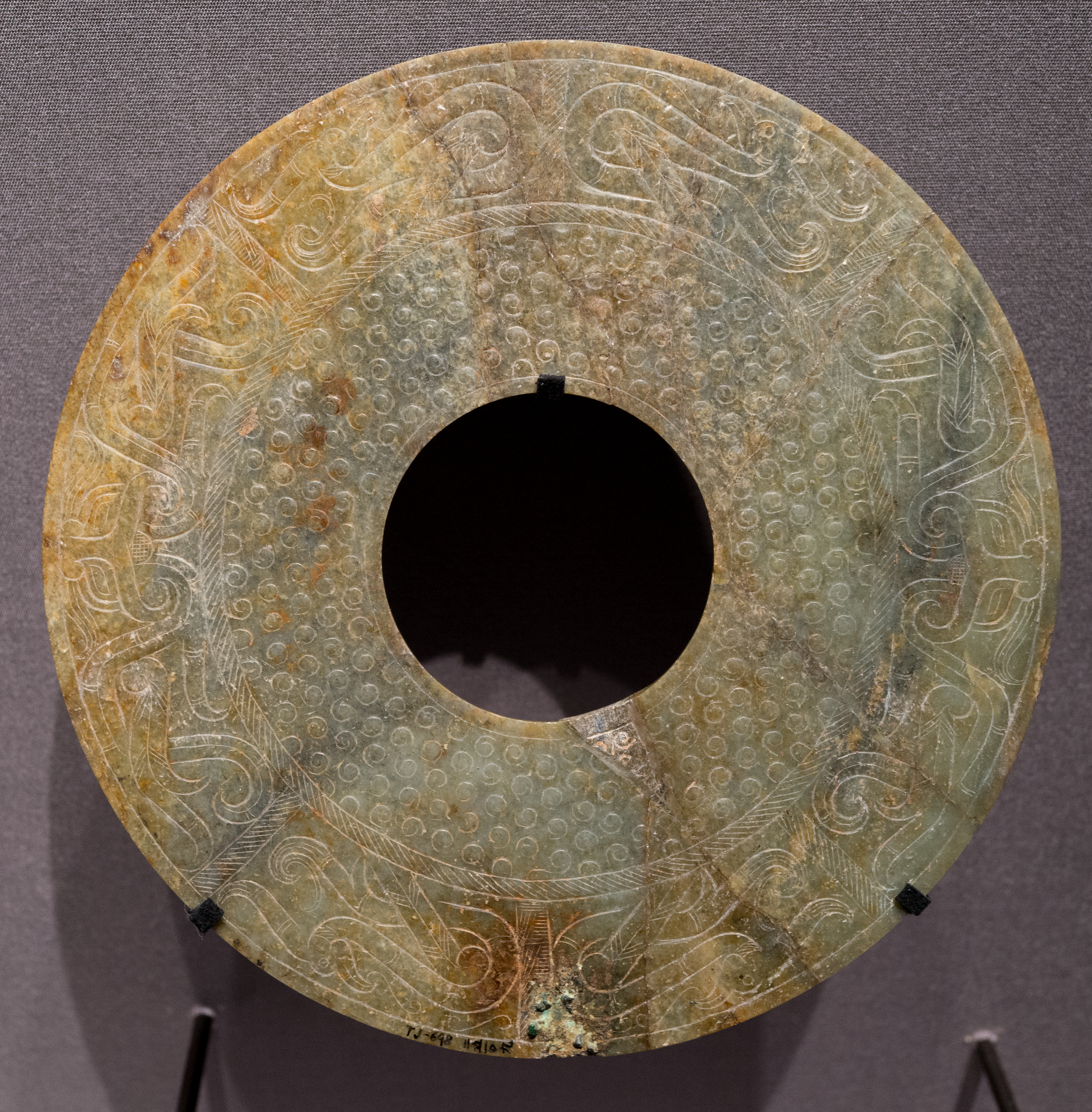
A Western Han dynasty bi, with dragon designs, 4th – 2nd century BC

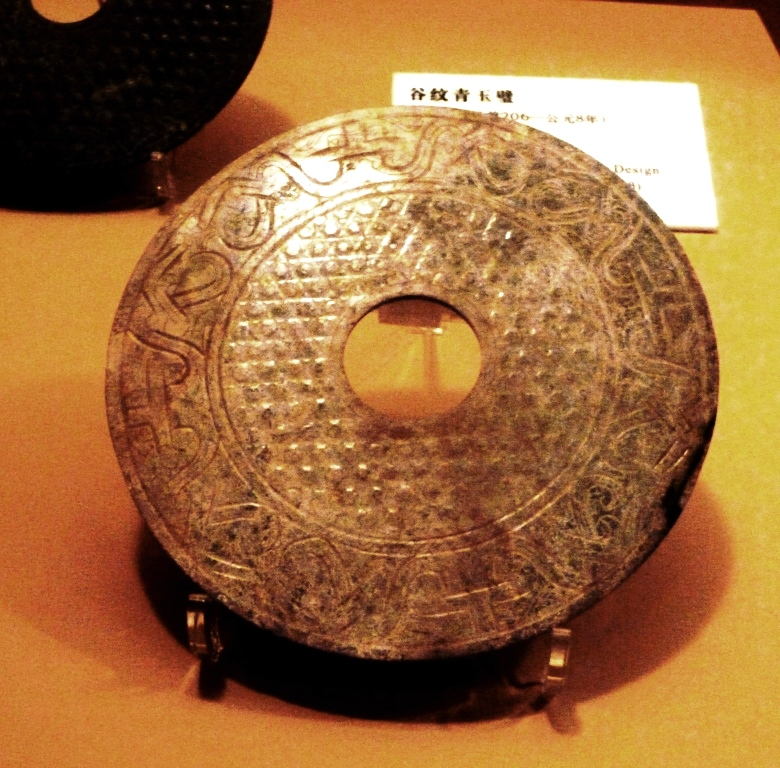
Jade bi in Shaanxi History Museum, Xi'an

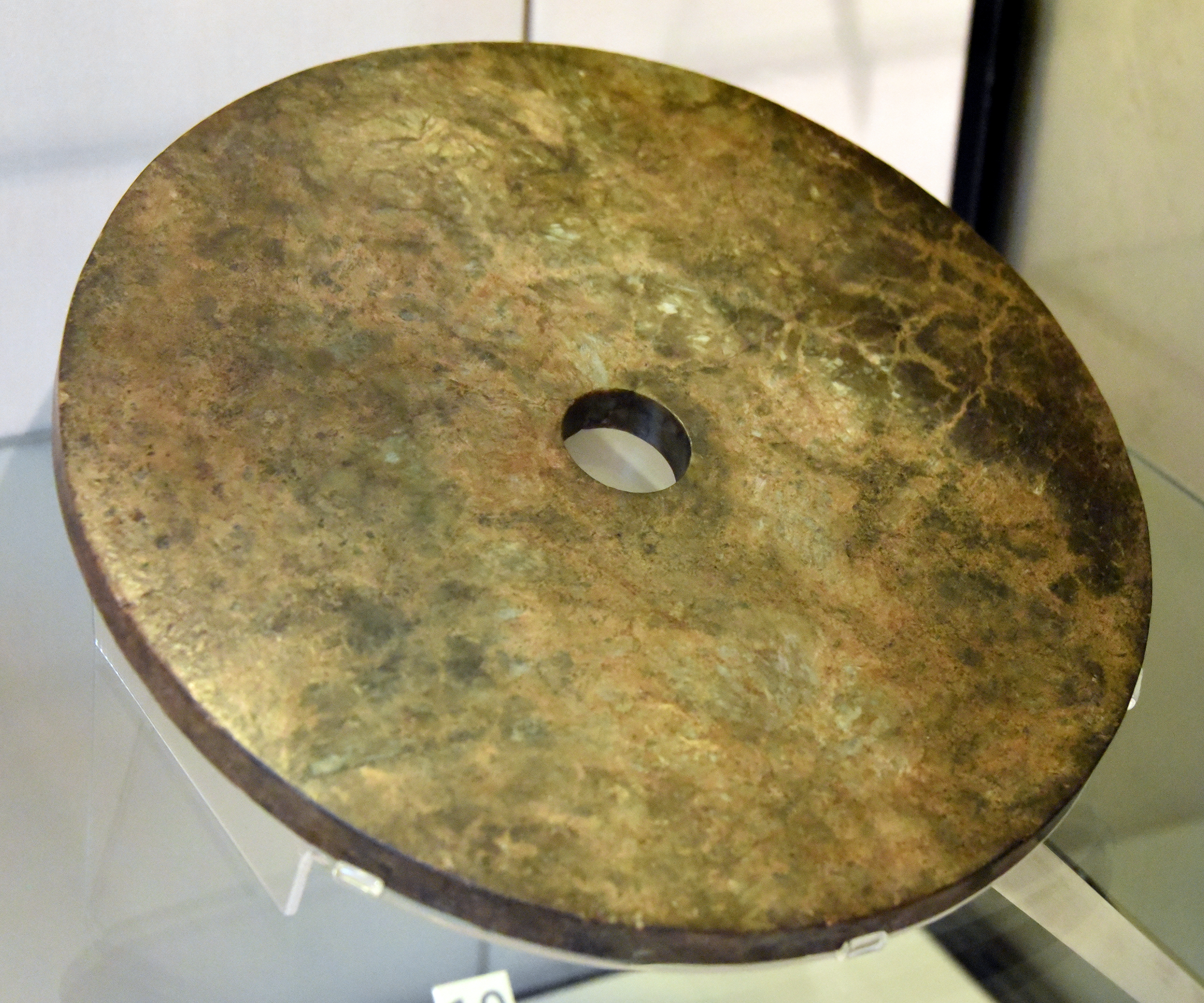
Jade disc (bi). Nephrite jade. Liangzhu Culture, south-east China. Neolithic period, c. 2500 BCE. Victoria and Albert Museum

== See also ==
- Dropa stones
- Glass bi disks
- Huang (jade)
- Mr. He's jade
- Rai stones
