= Ancient Chinese glass =

Glass made in China before the Qing dynasty (1644–1911)

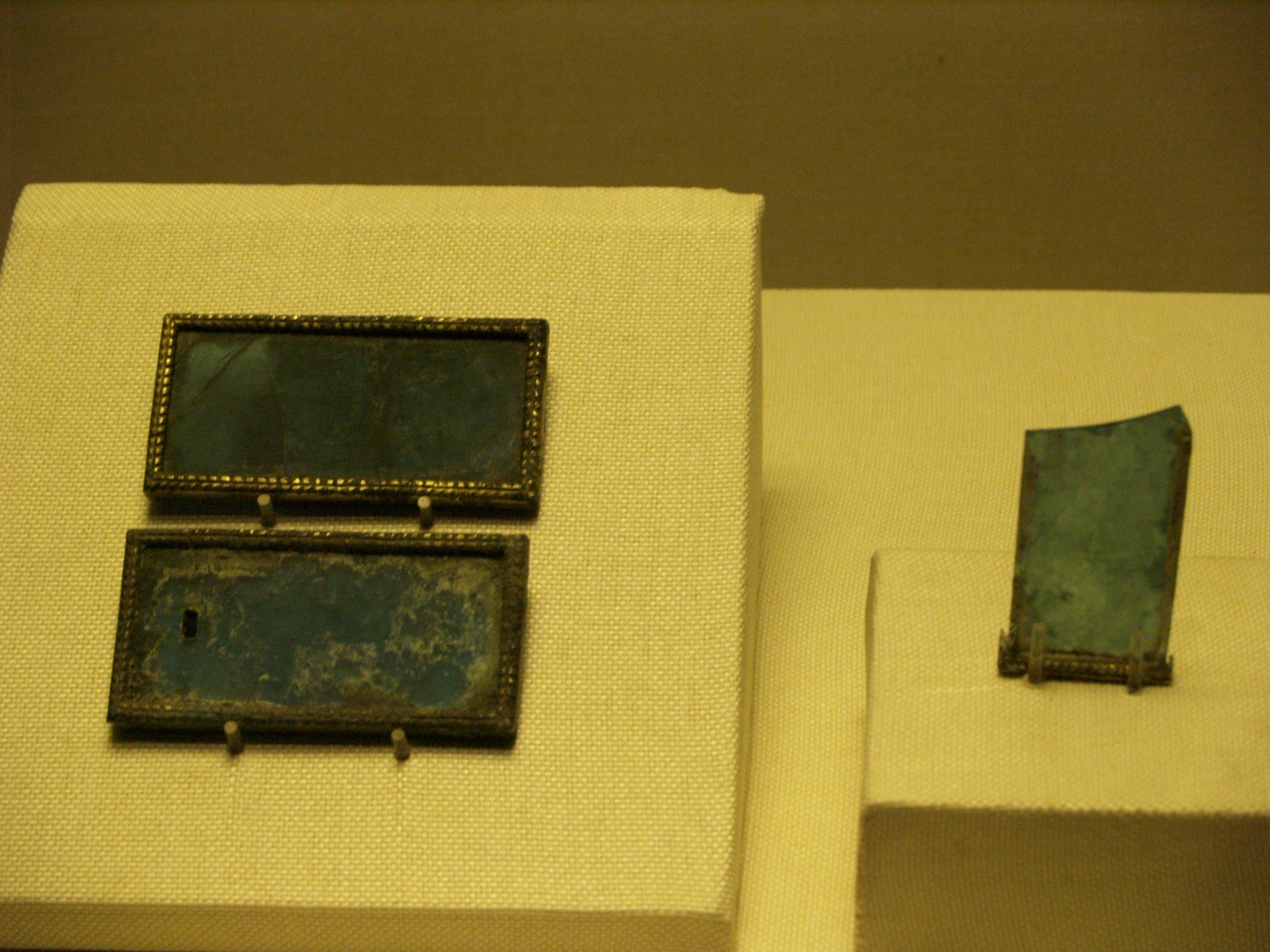
Blue glass plaques found in the Mausoleum of the Nanyue King, dating from late 2nd century BC

Ancient Chinese glass refers to all types of glass manufactured in China prior to the Qing dynasty (1644–1911). In Chinese history, glass played a peripheral role in arts and crafts, when compared to metal work and ceramics, such as porcelain, which was invented in China. The limited archaeological distribution and use of glass objects are evidence of the rarity of the material. Literary sources date the first manufacture of glass to the 5th century AD. However, the earliest archaeological evidence for glass manufacture in China comes from the Warring States period (475 BC to 221 BC).

The Chinese learned to manufacture glass comparatively later than the Mesopotamians, Egyptians and Indians. Imported glass objects first reached China during the late Spring and Autumn period – early Warring States period (early 5th century BC), in the form of polychrome 'eye beads'. These imports created the impetus for the production of indigenous glass beads.

During the Han period (206 BC to 220 AD) the use of glass diversified. The introduction of glass casting in this period encouraged the production of moulded objects, such as bi disks and other ritual objects. The Chinese glass objects from the Warring States period and Han dynasty vary greatly in chemical composition from the imported glass objects. The glasses from this period contain high levels of barium oxide (BaO) and lead, distinguishing them from the soda-lime-silica glasses of Western Asia and Mesopotamia. At the end of the Han dynasty (AD 220), the lead-barium glass tradition declined, with glass production only resuming during the 4th and 5th centuries AD.

== Chemical composition of Warring States and Han period glasses ==
At present, it is accepted that in China, glassmaking began around the 5th century BCE during the late Spring and Autumn to early Warring States periods. Chemical analyses of glass samples dating to this time have identified no less than three glass systems: potash-lime, lead-barium, and potash; of these, lead-barium was the most significant in early China.

During the Warring States period and the Han dynasty (5th century BC to early 3rd century AD) glass was imported from regions outside of East Asia, such as Mesopotamia. Imported Western faience and glass probably inspired the production of the first Chinese glasses. The main group of objects with Western influences are eye beads or dragonfly-eyed beads. The key difference between Near Eastern eye beads and Chinese eye beads is their chemical composition. The coloured glasses used to produce the Chinese eye beads have a high lead and barium content. This type of composition was exclusive to China, and it was used to produce a range of glass objects until the end of the Han dynasty.

Table 1 shows examples of chemical compositions of some Chinese glass objects.

| Objects | Date | SiO_{2} | Al_{2}O_{3} | Fe_{2}O_{3} | CuO | CaO | MgO | K_{2}O | Na_{2}O | BaO | PbO |
|---|---|---|---|---|---|---|---|---|---|---|---|
| Eye bead | 4th to 3rd centuries BC | 55 | 2.13 | 0.62 | 0.31 | 2.95 | 1.27 | 4.05 | 7.53 | 9.74 | 15.0 |
| Large bead | Han dynasty | 37.2 | 0.15 | 0.01 | 0.30 | 1.01 | 1.17 | 0.02 | 3.94 | 14.6 | 41.4 |
| Cube shaped bead | 4th to 1st centuries BC | 51 | 0.46 | 0.10 | 0.01 | 0.37 | 1.52 | 0.084 | 6.12 | 11.4 | 28.3 |
| Bi disk | 3rd century BC | 36.8 | 0.28 | 0.14 | 0.02 | 0.46 | 0.15 | 0.16 | 1.87 | 17.4 | 42.6 |
| 'Glass garment' plaque | Late Han dynasty | 36.03 | 0.02 | 0.07 | ---- | 0.22 | 0.08 | 0.07 | 2.27 | 21.49 | 40.37 |
| Ritual disk | Warring States | 37.16 | 0.62 | 0.16 | 0.03 | 1.95 | 0.40 | 0.27 | 3.32 | 13.4 | 39.8 |

Table 1: Elemental compositions of Chinese glass from the Warring States period to Han dynasty. Data from the first 4 objects was taken from Brill et al. 1991; data from glass garment plaque was taken from Cheng Zhuhai and Zhou Changyuan 1991; and data from the ritual disk was taken from Shi Meiguang 1991.

The Chinese lead-barium glasses typically present 5-15% BaO. The source of barium in the glass in not clear; however it is possible that ancient Chinese glassmakers used witherite (a mineral form of barium carbonate) as an ingredient. The use of a separate ingredient implies that barium had a specific function. This function could have been to flux the glass, by lowering the melting point of the melt; or stabilize the glass, by making it less soluble to water. It could also have been added to opacify the glass. Electron microprobe analysis of glass fragments have shown that the turbidity of certain lead-barium glasses is produced by barium disilicate crystals. This turbidity gives the glasses a jade-like appearance.

== Glass objects in the Warring States and Han periods ==
The period between the Warring States period and the Han dynasty shaped the early Chinese glass industry. Most of the glass objects from this period come from archaeological excavations of tombs. Because of this, most glass objects have fairly secure dating and context. During this period, the Chinese mainly used glass to produce two distinct types of objects: polychrome eye beads and monochrome funerary objects.

=== Eye beads ===
The earliest types of glass objects found in China are polychrome eye beads or dragonfly-eyed beads. The beads are found in burials from the late Spring and Autumn and early Warring States periods (early 5th century BC) up to late Warring State – early Western Han period. Most beads have a monochrome glass body covered by several layers of coloured glass. The layers of different colour glass are applied in alternating fashion to produce concentric circles. The patterns of circles resemble eyes, giving the beads their name. This style of bead originated in the Near East during the mid 2nd millennium BC. The stylistic influence later spread to the Mediterranean. The use of eye beads in burials rapidly declined at the beginning of the Western Han period. This is believed to be a result of the invasion of Chu kingdom territories by Qin and Han armies at the end of the 3rd century. The collapse of the Chu kingdom would have brought production of eye-beads to an end.

=== Monochrome opaque objects ===
During the Warring States and Han periods, Chinese glassworkers took advantage of the similarities between glass and jade. Many glass objects found in burial contexts in this period were made of opaque green, light green, or milky white glass. These objects have similar shapes to their jade counterparts, and were no doubt imitating that precious stone. Among these objects there were bi disks, 'glass garments' (or glass suits), sword accessories, and vessels, among others.

==== Bi disks ====
A bi disk is a ritual object in the shape of a flat ring (annulus). The earliest archeological specimens were carved from stone (usually nephrite) and date back to the late Neolithic period; they became important burial elements during the 3rd millennium BC. They were placed on or near the head of the deceased person.

Glass bi disks are the most numerous kind of monochrome glass objects. They first became abundant in the Chu kingdom during the Warring States period. Bi disks from this period tend to be between 7.9 and 9.4 cm in diameter. The glass bi disks look very similar to their stone contemporaries, usually decorated on one side with a simple grain or cloud pattern typical of jade objects. They are mainly found in medium to small-sized tombs, indicating the middle strata of society rather than the elite. This suggests that glass bi disks were regarded as cheaper alternatives to jade bi disks.

==== Glass burial suit plaques ====
Plaques from glass burial suits or glass garments are directly linked to jade objects. Several pieces of burial suit plaques have been found in a few wooden-chambered burials from the late West Han dynasty. The plaques come in different shapes, with rectangular being the most common. Some of these rectangular pieces have perforations in 4 corners, indicating that they were strung together, or sewn into a fabric, to form a protective burial suit. Other shapes, such as circular, triangular, and rhomboidal, are often decorated with moulded patterns. All the glass plaque shapes have jade counterparts, suggesting that glass burial suits were a cheaper alternative to jade burial suits.

==== Vessels ====
The earliest known Chinese glass vessels come from Western Han dynasty tombs. To this date only two tombs are known to have had glass vessels among their funerary objects: the tomb of the Liu Dao, Prince of Chu in Xuzhou (128 BC), Jiangsu Province; and the tomb of Liu Sheng, Prince Jing of Zhongshan (113 BC) at Mancheng. The tomb at Xuzhou contained 16 light green cylindrical cups; while Prince Liu Sheng's tomb contained 2 shallow double-handled cups and a plate. All of the vessels were traditional Chinese shapes and made of lead-barium glass. Vessels in these forms were normally made out of lacquer or ceramic, although some jade vessels in those shapes are also known. All vessels were produced by mold casting used by the lead-barium glass. But this tradition declined at the end of the Han dynasty (AD 220), with glass production only resuming during the 4th and 5th centuries AD. There are no vessels produced by mold casting from the tombs of the Three Kingdoms.

== See also ==
- History of glass
- Warring States crystal glass
