= Huang (jade) =

Jade artefact used as a pendant

A huang (Chinese: 璜) is a Chinese arc-shaped jade artifact that was used as a pendant.

Huang arcs were used in a jade pei ornament set (組玉佩), which would be worn from the belt. The pendant set would emit a faint pleasant sound as the wearer walked, in line with the customs of Confucian etiquette. The number of huang arcs in a set of jade pendants is not always the same. It is suggested that the amount in a set may have indicated the social status of the person.

At the ends of a huang, there were often abstract heads of animals carved into the jade. During the Eastern Zhou period, block-shaped tiger-like ends were often used in the huang, but these would develop into more abstract notches.

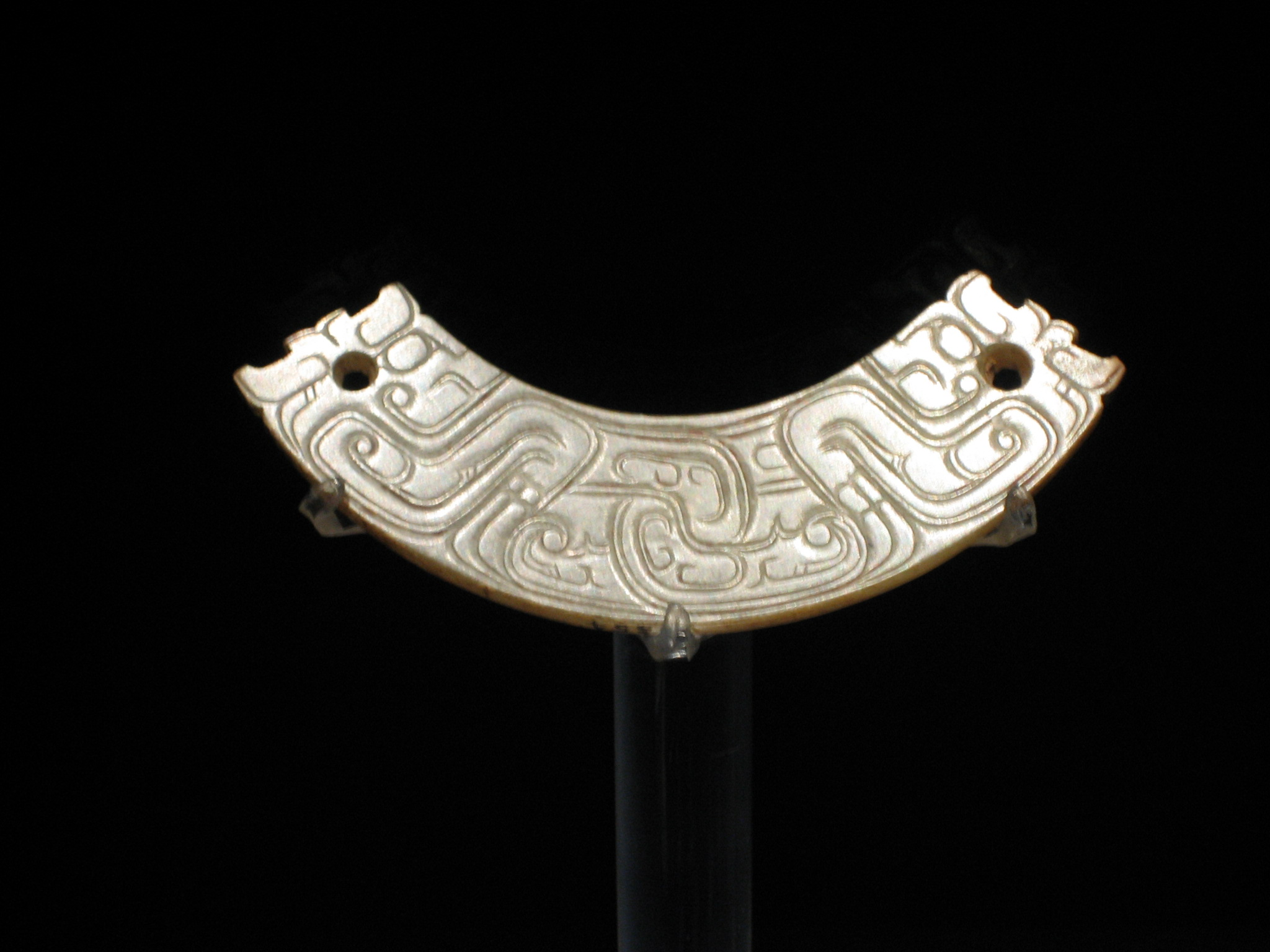
Huang with interlocked dragon design, Western Zhou period, housed in the Shanghai Museum

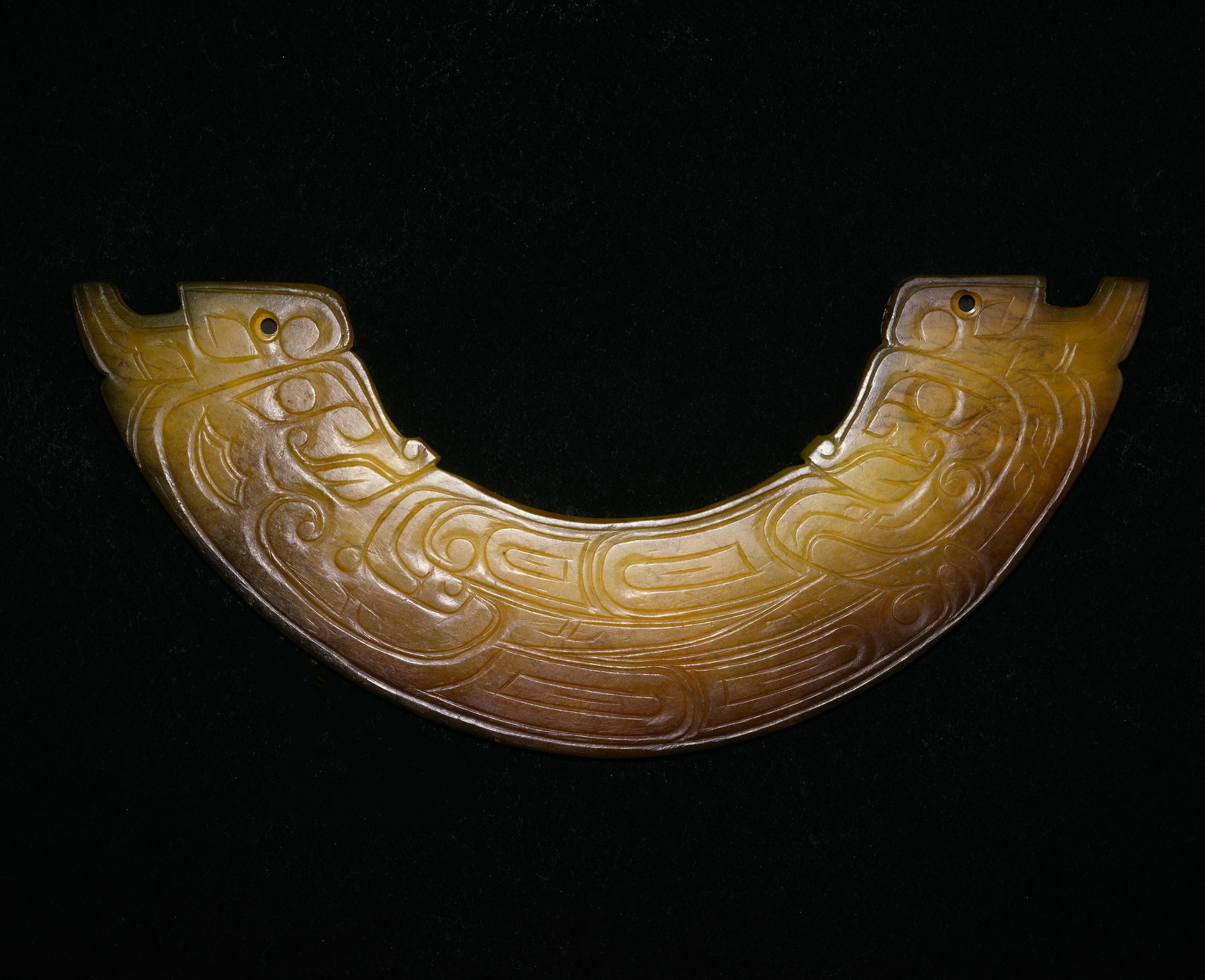
Huang, Western Zhou period, housed in the Art Institute of Chicago

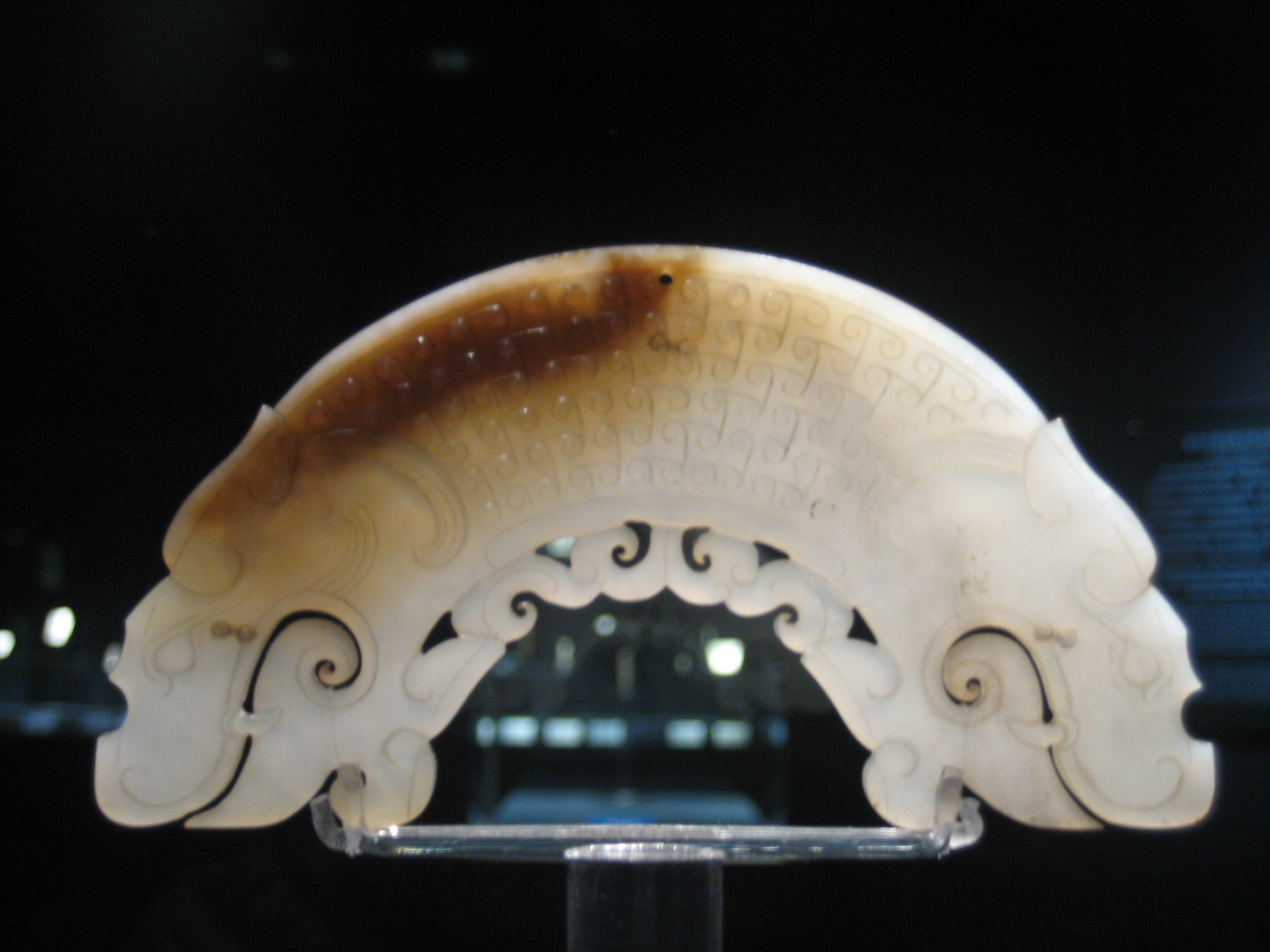
Huang with two dragon heads, Warring States period, housed in the Shanghai Museum

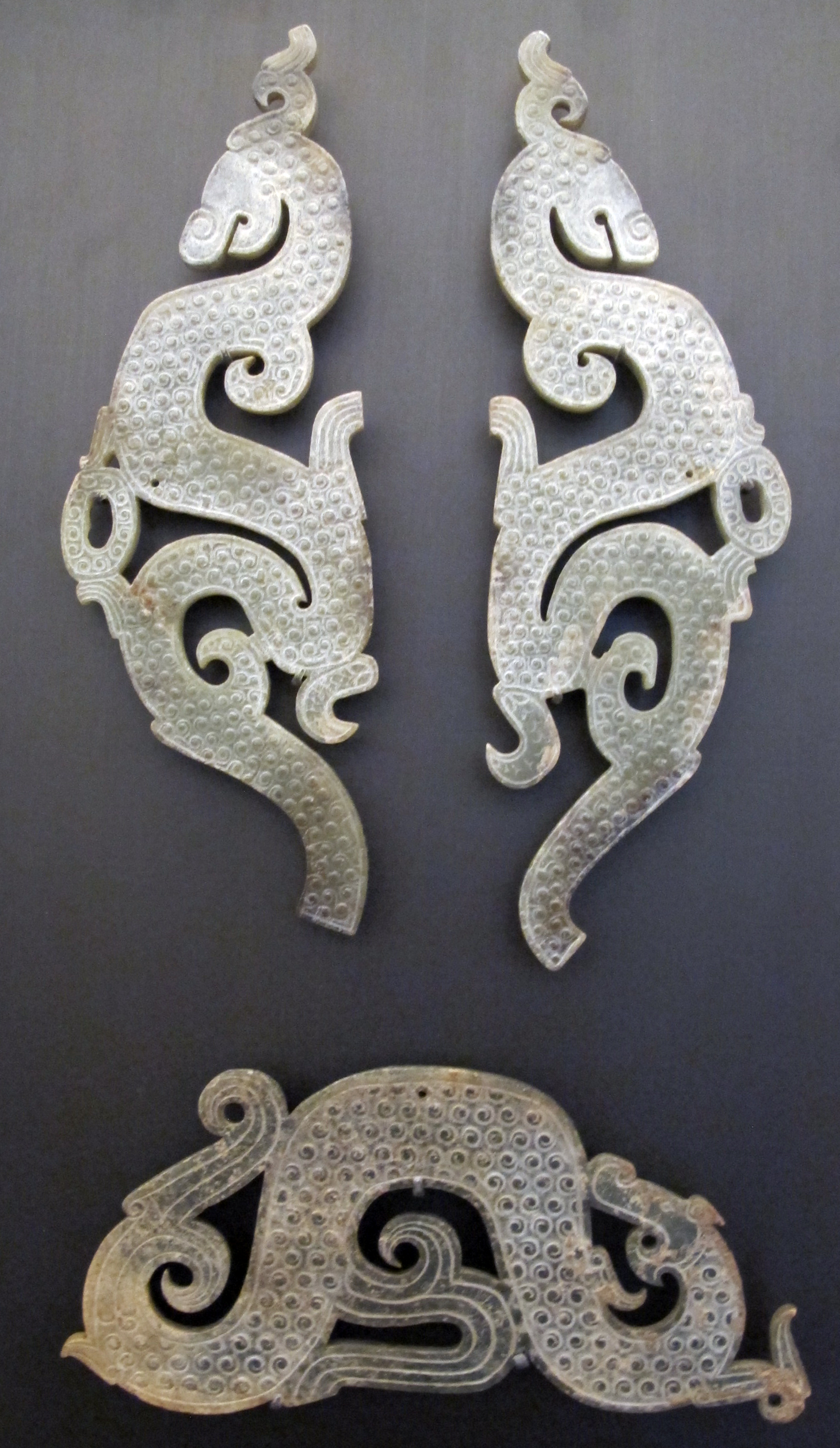
Huang and two other pendants from green jade, Western Han period, housed in the Guimet Museum

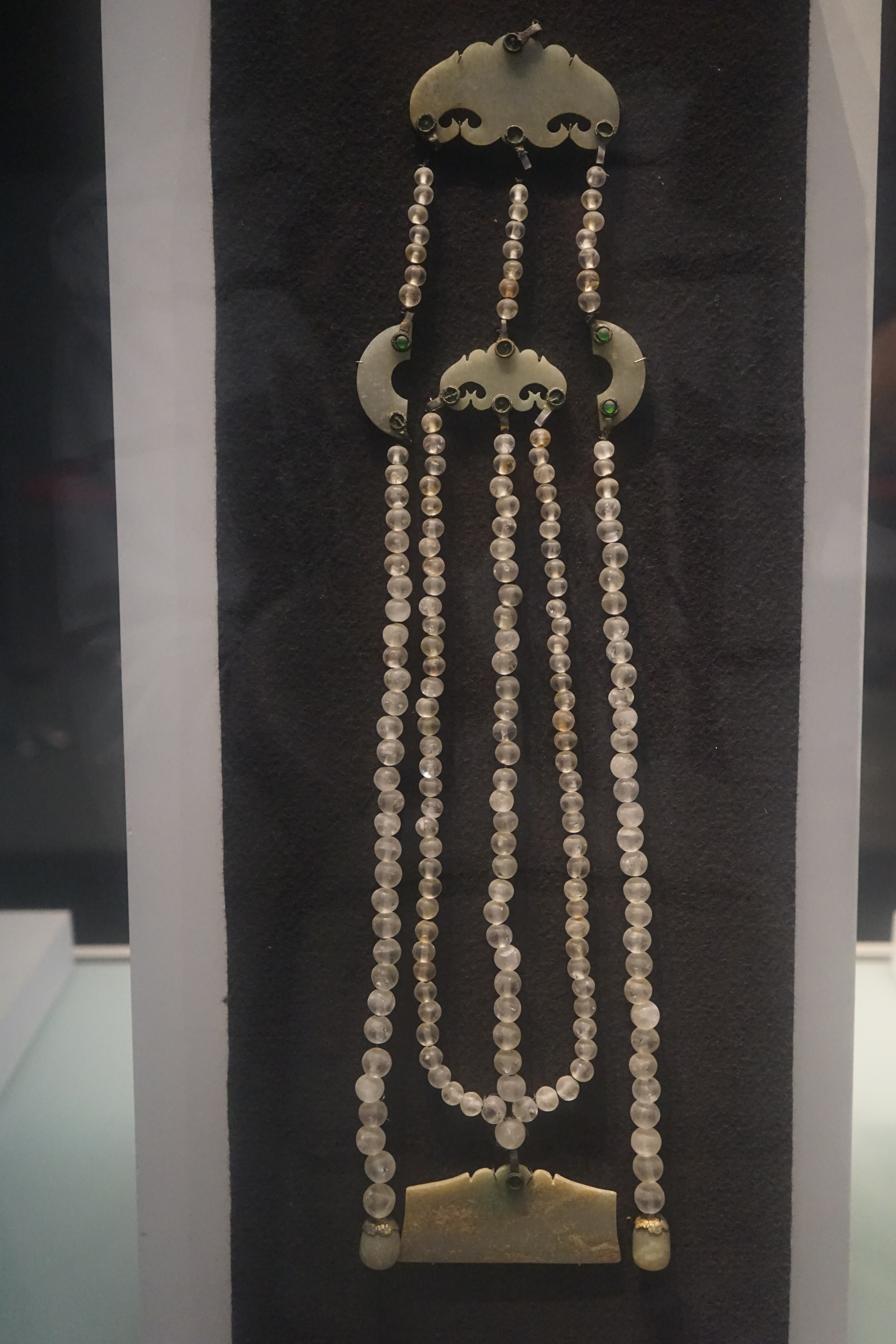
A jade pei ornament set combines jade artifacts in a variety of ways. This one, from the Tang dynasty, includes a pair of symmetrical huang arcs.

== See also ==
- Bi (jade)
