= Bian Jinyang =

Chinese author (born 1993)

Bian Jinyang (Chinese: 边金阳; pinyin: Biān Jīnyáng; born 16 September 1993) is a Chinese author from Heilongjiang. In 2003, 9-year-old Bian published his first books 《时光魔琴》 and 《秦人部落》 under the pen name Yang Yang (阳阳). Many Chinese readers described his books as comparable to J. K. Rowling's Harry Potter series.

Bian's father is Bian Yunfeng (Chinese: 边云峰). Bian is from Jiamusi in Heilongjiang and attended Hongmei Primary School (Chinese: 红梅小学) and Dalian No. 44 Middle School (Chinese: 大连市第四十四中学).
