= Luminous gemstones =

Worldwide motif in mythology and history

Folktales about luminous gemstones are an almost worldwide motif in mythology and history among Asian, European, African, and American cultures. Some stories about light-emitting gems may have been based on luminescent and phosphorescent minerals such as diamonds.

== Mineralogical luminosity ==
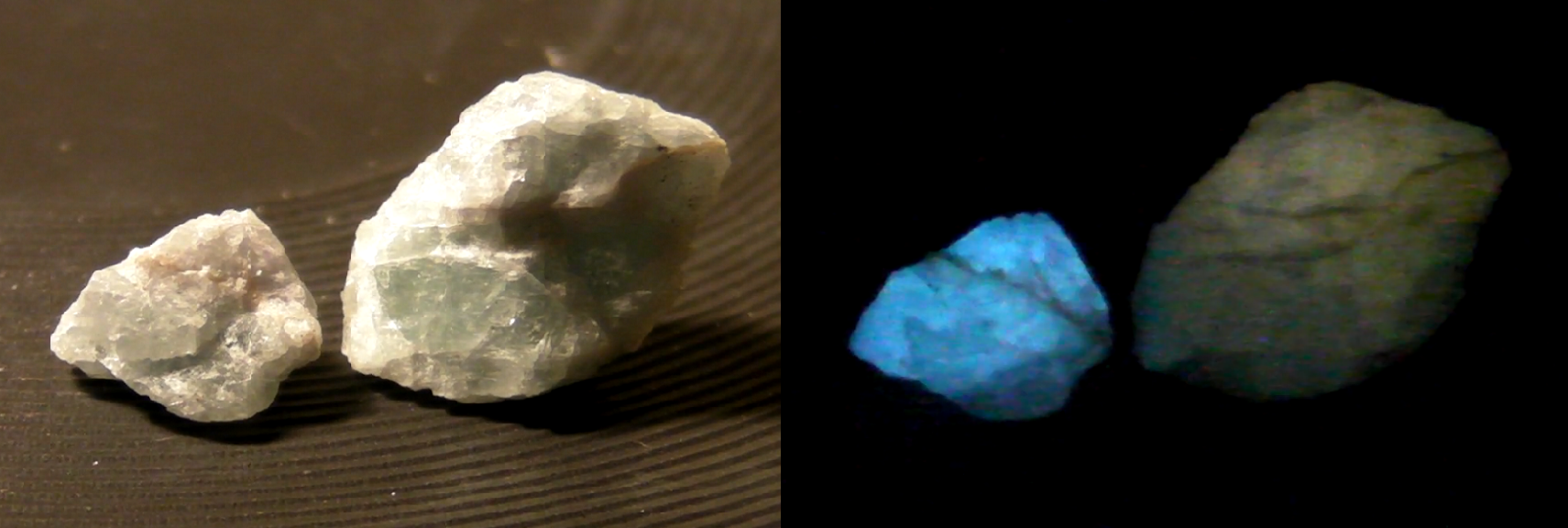
Thermoluminescence from heating chlorophane specimens on a hotplate.

Triboluminescence from rubbing together two quartz crystals.

First, it will be useful to introduce some mineralogical terminology for gemstones that can glow when exposed to light, friction, or heat. Note that the following discussion will omit modern techniques such as X-rays and ultraviolet light that are too recent to have influenced folklore about luminous gems. Luminescence is spontaneous emission of light by a substance not resulting from heat, as distinguished from incandescence, which is light emitted by a substance as a result of heating. Luminescence is caused by the absorption of energy that is released in small amounts. When the energy comes from light or other electromagnetic radiation, it is referred to as photoluminescence; which is divisible between fluorescence when the glow ceases immediately with the excitation and phosphorescence when the glow continues beyond the period of excitation. Two types of luminescent phenomena are relevant to crystalline materials. Triboluminescence generates light through the breaking of chemical bonds in a material when it is rubbed, pulled apart, scratched, or crushed. Thermoluminescence re-emits previously absorbed electromagnetic radiation upon being heated (e.g., thermoluminescence dating).

The American geologist Sydney Hobart Ball, who wrote an article on "Luminous Gems, Mythical and Real", outlined the history of discoveries about luminescent and phosphorescent minerals. Most diamonds are triboluminescent if rubbed with a cloth, and a few are photoluminescent after exposure to direct sunlight. Both diamonds and white topaz may phosphoresce if heated below red heat. The phosphorescent quality of diamonds when heated by sunlight is usually believed to have been first revealed by Albertus Magnus (c. 1193–1280) and it was apparently rediscovered by Robert Boyle in 1663, who also found that some diamonds will luminesce under pressure. According to Prafulla Chandra Ray, the Indian king Bhoja (r. 1010–1055) knew that diamonds can phosphoresce.

The luminescent Bologna Stone (impure barite), which was discovered by Vincenzo Cascariolo in 1602, was sometimes called "lapis lunaris" ("lunar stone"), because, like the moon, it gave out in the darkness the light it received from the sun. In 1735, the French chemist Charles François de Cisternay du Fay determined that lapis lazuli, emerald, and aquamarine were luminescent. Josiah Wedgwood, in 1792, found phosphoresce from rubbing together two pieces of quartz or of agate, and wrote that the ruby gives "a beautiful red light of short continuance."

Edmond Becquerel reported in 1861 that ruby fluoresces better than sapphire, red feldspar fluoresces, and crushed orthoclase will flame. In 1833, David Brewster discovered the fluorescence of the mineral fluorite or fluorspar. However, the English naturalist Philip Skippon (1641–1691) stated that one Monsieur Lort, of Montpellier, France, a "counterfeiter" of "amethysts, topazes, emeralds, and sapphires" found that on heating "fluor smaragdi" (Latin for "flowing emerald/beryl/jasper") in a pan of coals and afterwards "putting it in a dark place (it) shines very much: At the same time several other stones were tried but did not shine" (1732 6: 718).

Some fluorite, particularly the variety chlorophane (aka pyroemerald and cobra stone), may become very faintly luminescent simply from the heat of one's hand. Chlorophane is unusual for combining the properties of thermoluminescence, triboluminescence, phosphorescence, and fluorescence; it will emit visible spectrum light when rubbed, or exposed to light or heat, and can continue emitting for a long period of time. Among the gravels of the Irtysh River, near Krasnoyarsk, Russia, the German mineralogist Gustav Rose recorded seeing chlorophane pebbles that shone with brilliancy all night long, merely from exposure to the sun's heat. For luminous gem myths, Ball concludes that while it is "not impossible that the inventors of certain of the [luminous gem] tales may have been acquainted with the luminosity of gems, in my opinion many of the tales must be of other origin".

Scholars have proposed many identifications for myths about luminous gemstones described for over two thousand years. Most frequently rubies or carbuncles (often red garnets), which classical and medieval mineralogists did not differentiate, and less commonly other gems, including diamonds, emeralds, jade, and pearls.

The American sinologist Edward H. Schafer proposes that the phosphorescent "emeralds" of classical antiquity, such as the brilliantly shining green eyes of the marble lion on the tomb of King Hermias of Atarneus (d. 341 BCE) on Cyprus, were fluorite, even though the Hellenistic alchemists had methods, "seemingly magical, of making night-shining gems by the application of phosphorescent paints to stones", the most famous being their "emeralds" and "carbuncles".

The names of some luminescent gemstones etymologically derive from "glow" or "fire" words (e.g., pyroemerald for "chlorophane" above). The OED defines pyrope (from Greek Πυρωπός, lit. "fire-eyed")" as: "In early use applied vaguely to a red or fiery gem, as ruby or carbuncle; (mineralogy) the Bohemian garnet or fire-garnet"; and carbuncle or carbuncle-stone (from Latin "carbunculus", "small glowing ember") as: "A name variously applied to precious stones of a red or fiery colour; the carbuncles of the ancients (of which Pliny describes twelve varieties) were probably sapphires, spinels or rubies, and garnets; in the Middle Ages and later, besides being a name for the ruby, the term was esp. applied to a mythical gem said to emit a light in the dark".

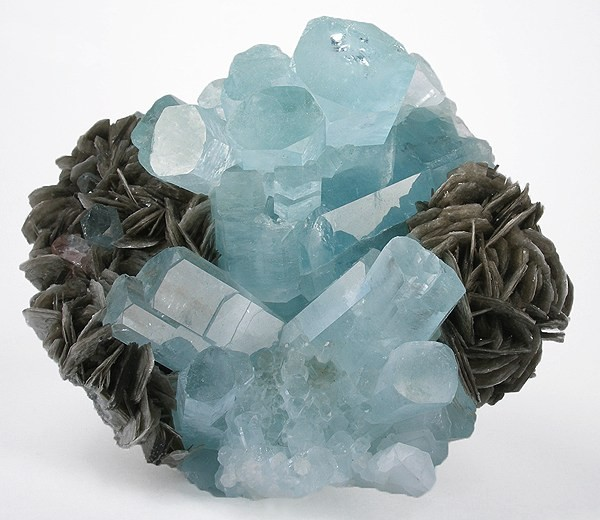
Aquamarine

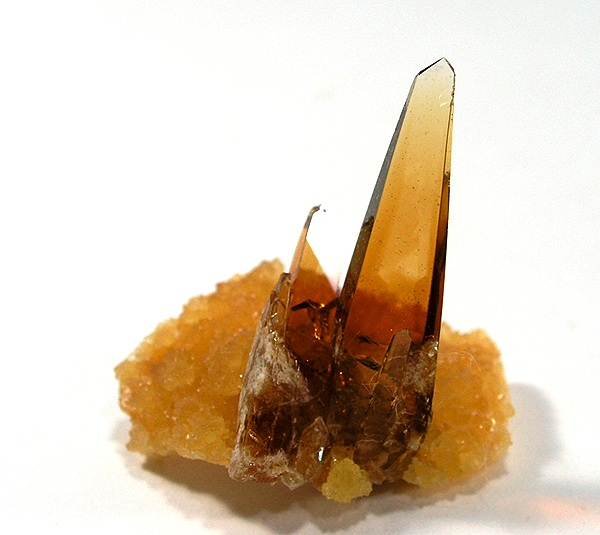
Barite

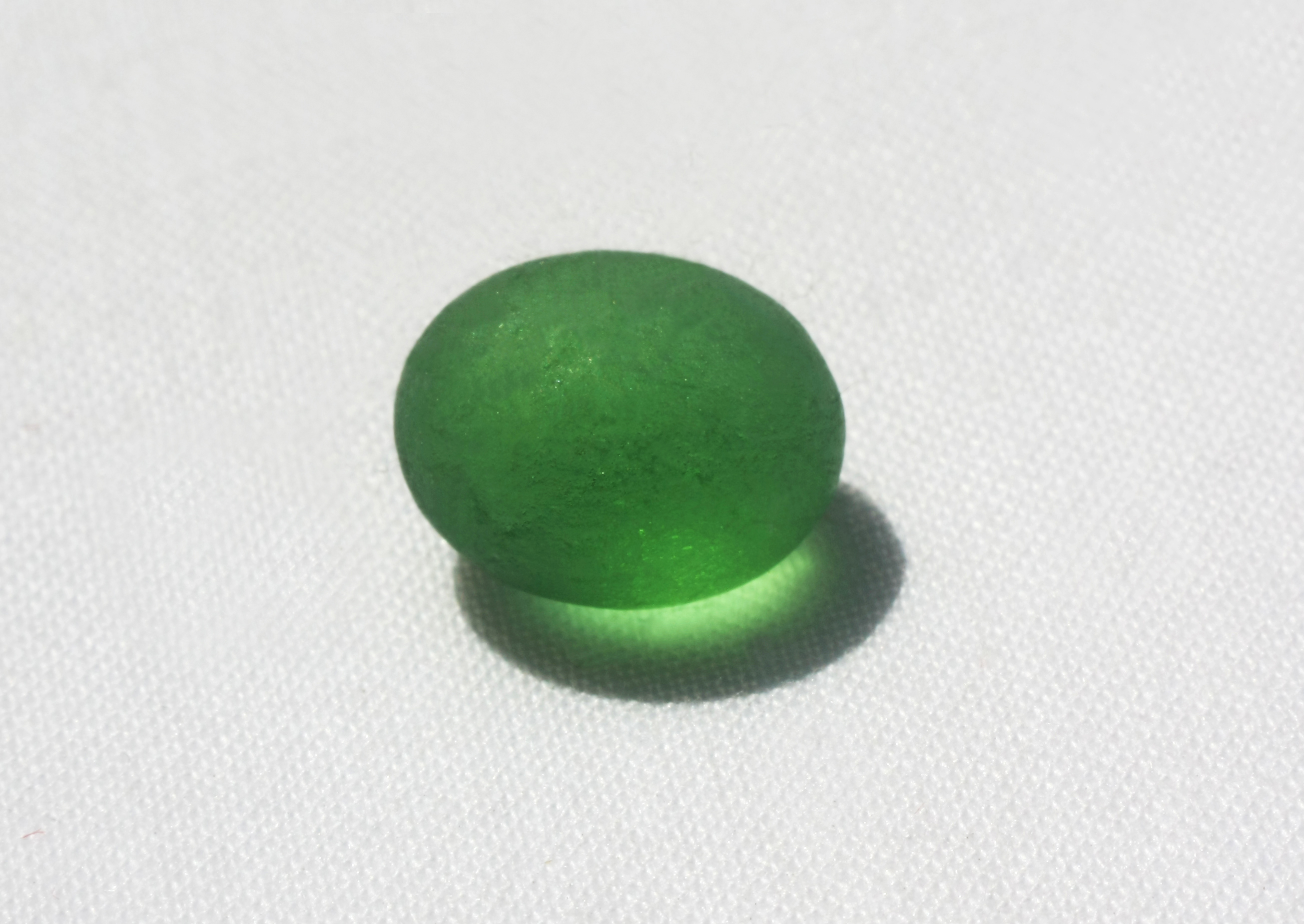
Chlorophane

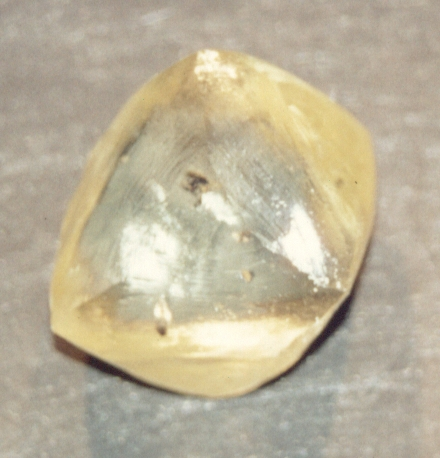
Diamond

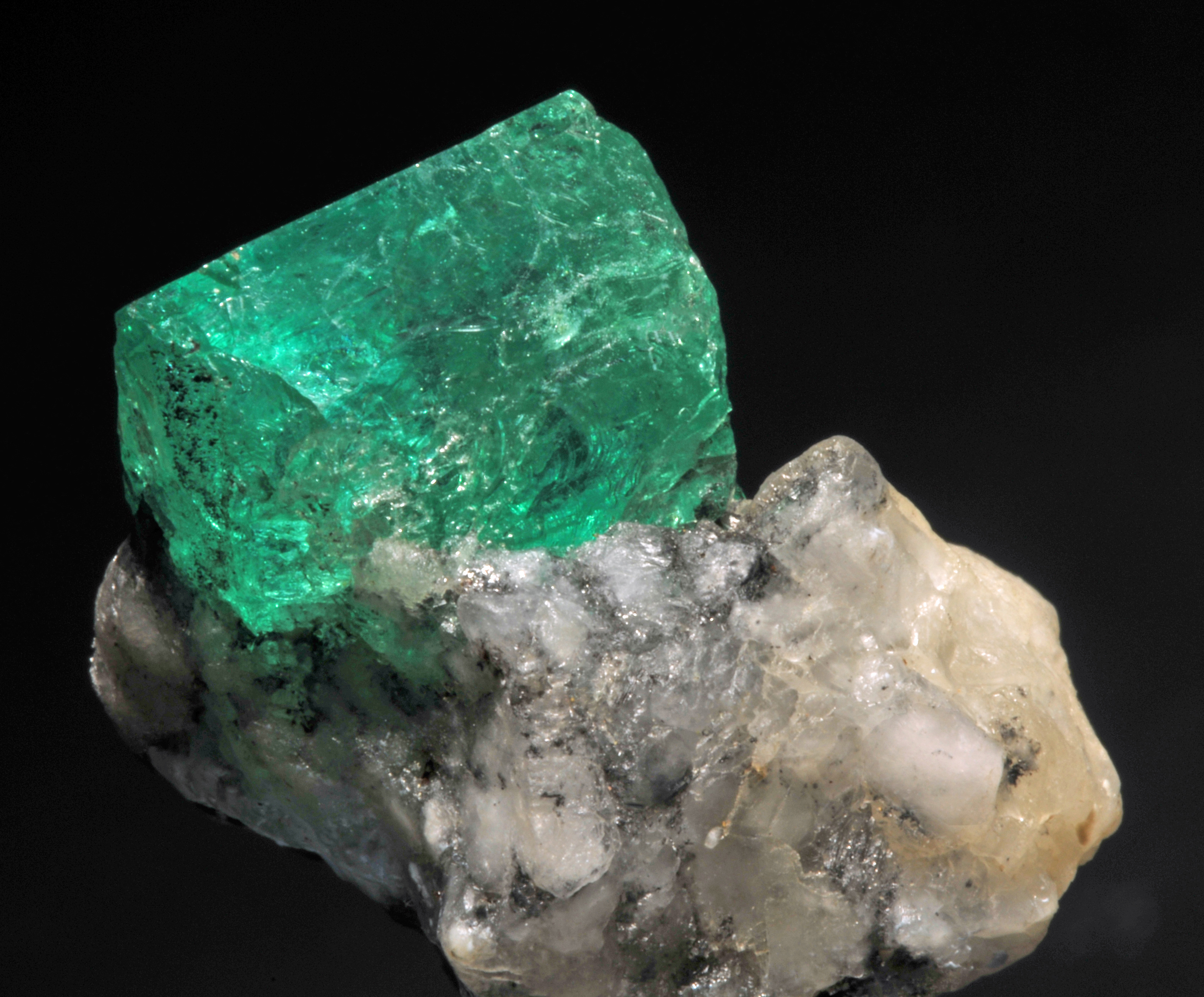
Emerald

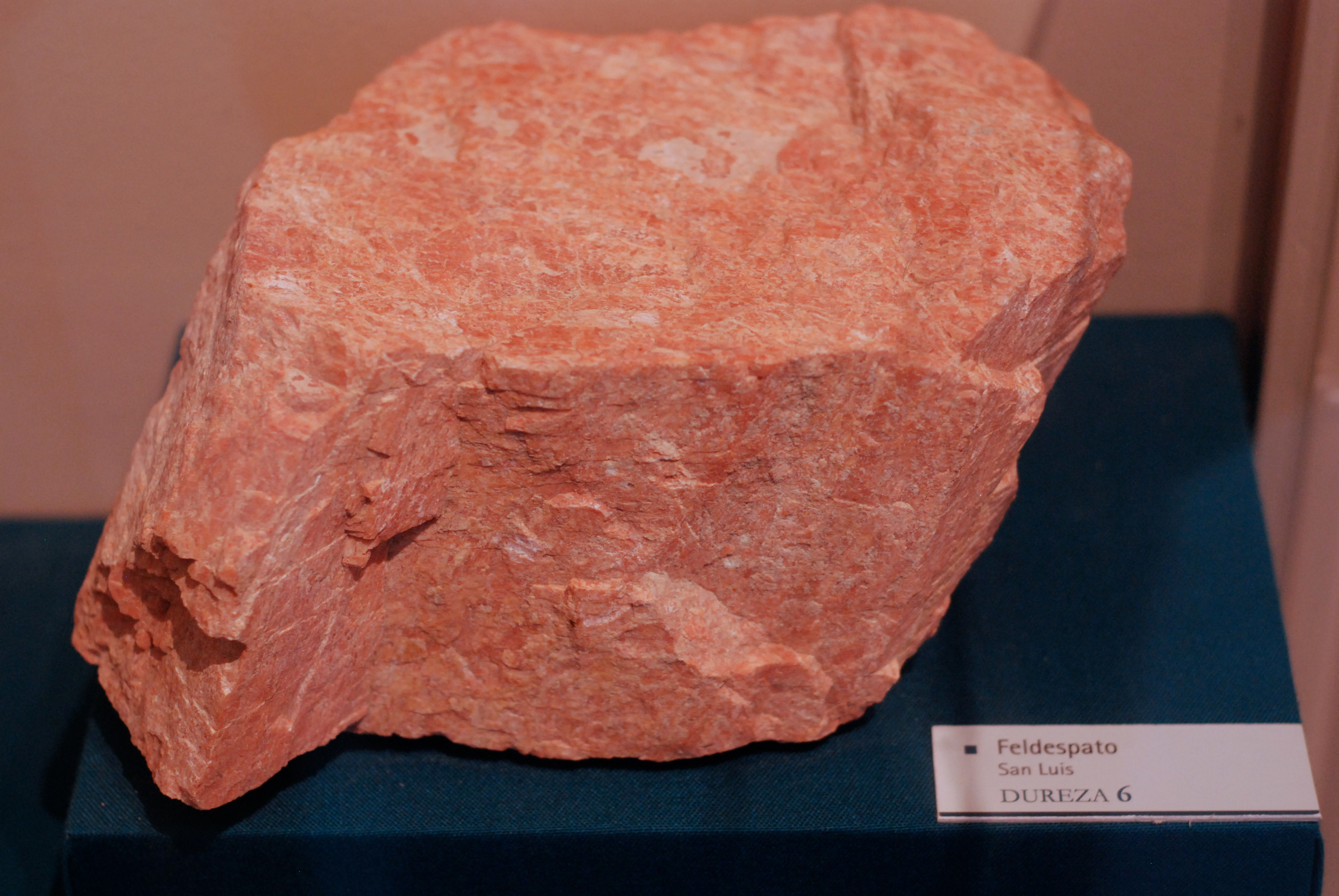
Feldspar

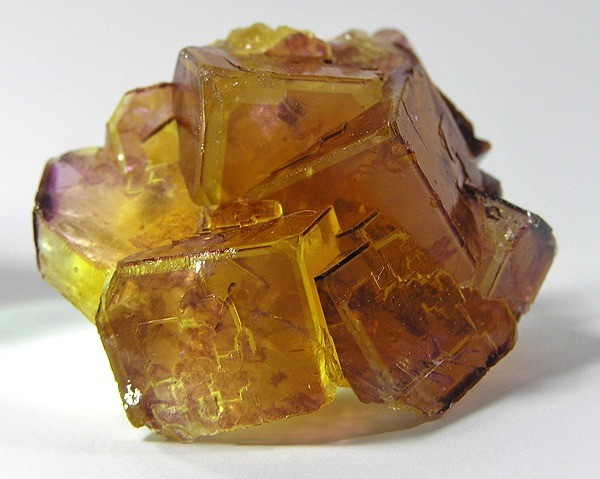
Fluorite

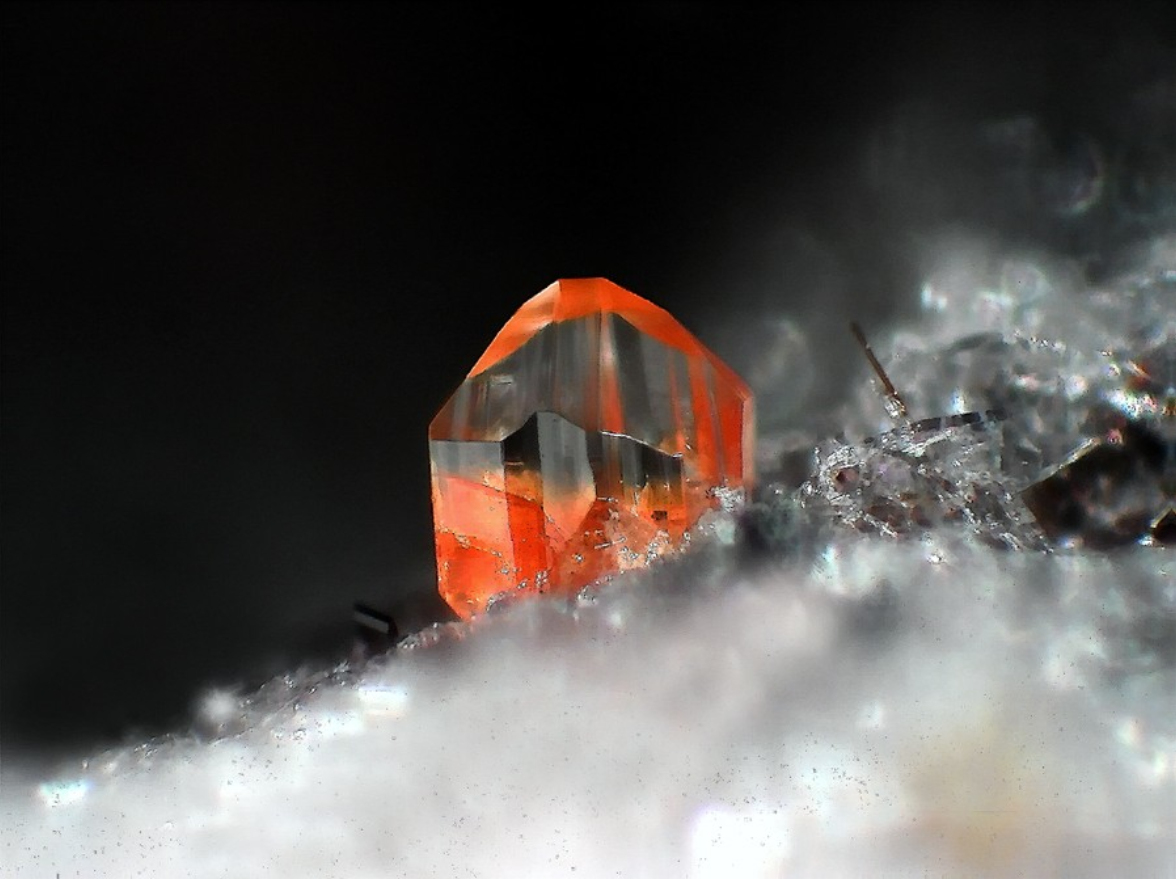
Fosterite

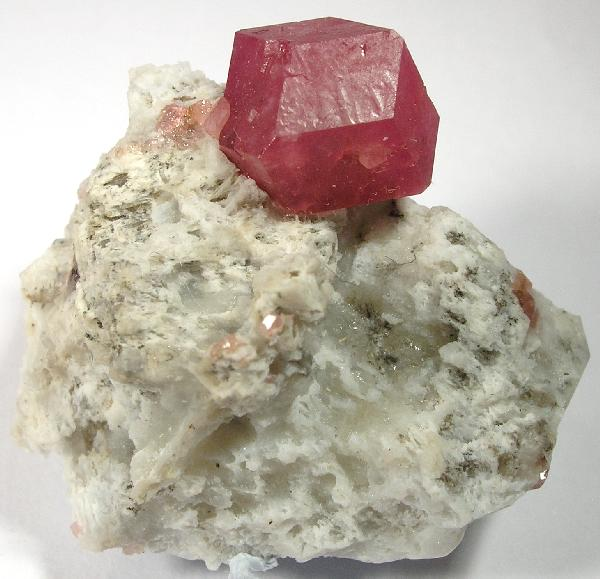
Garnet

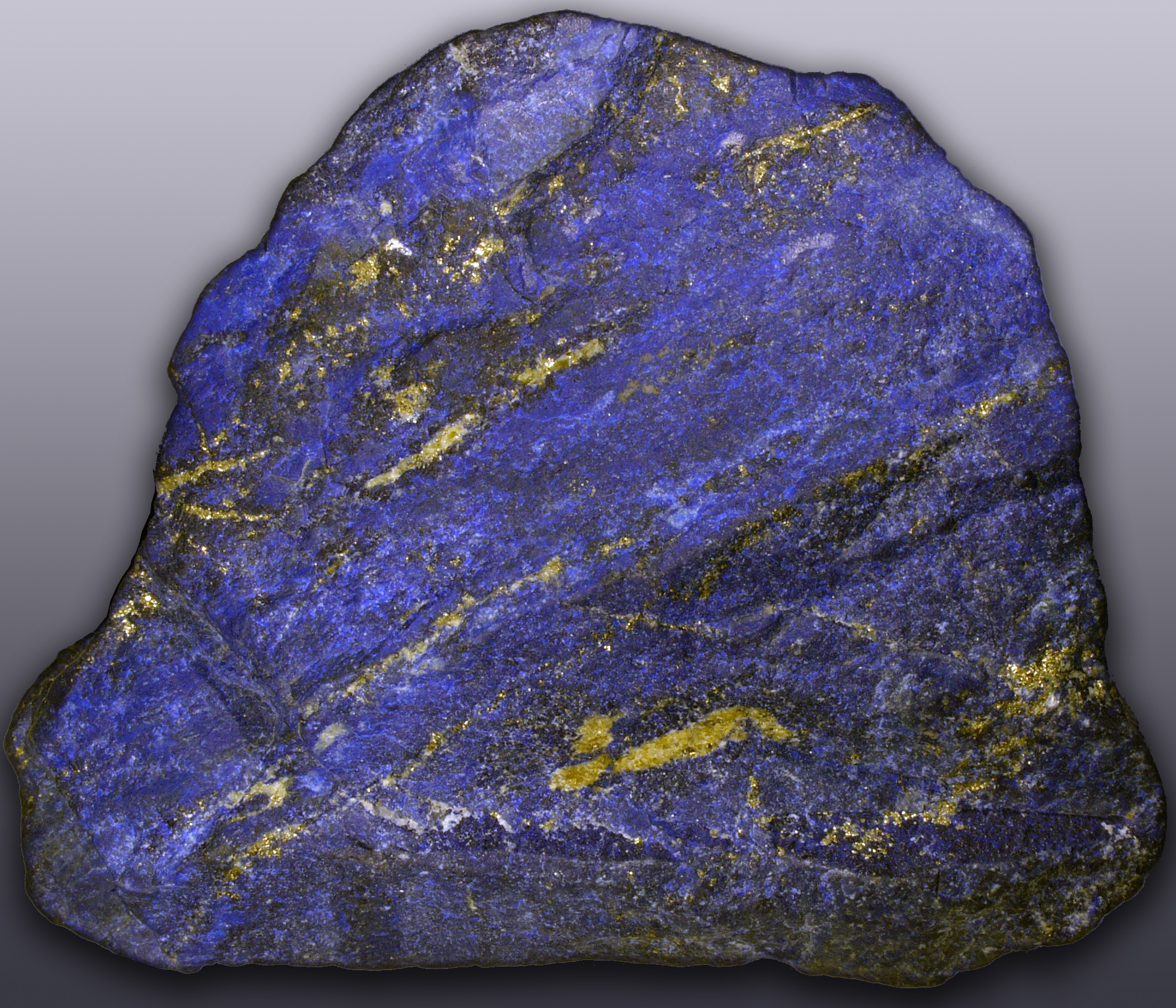
Lapis lazuli

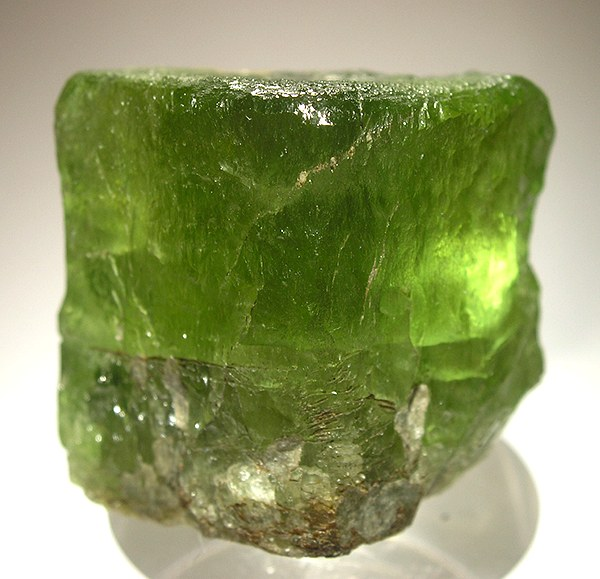
Olivine

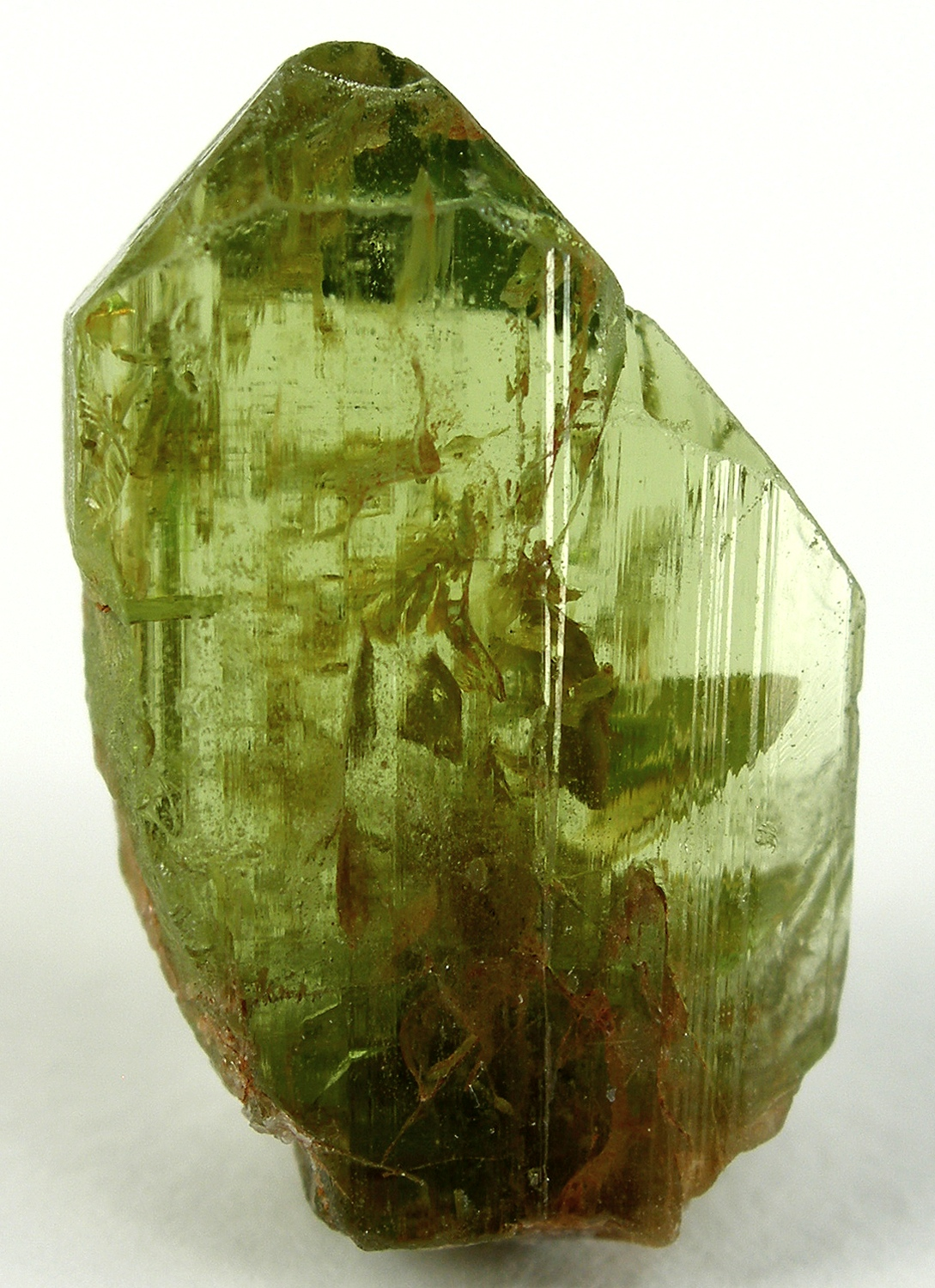
Peridot

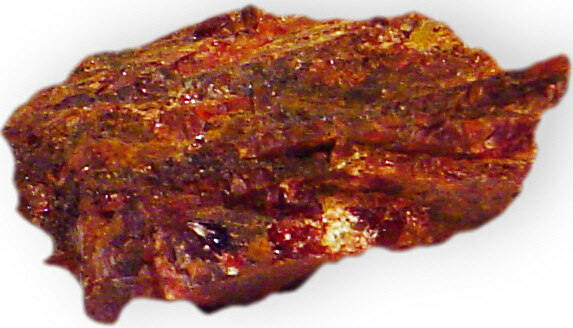
Pyrope

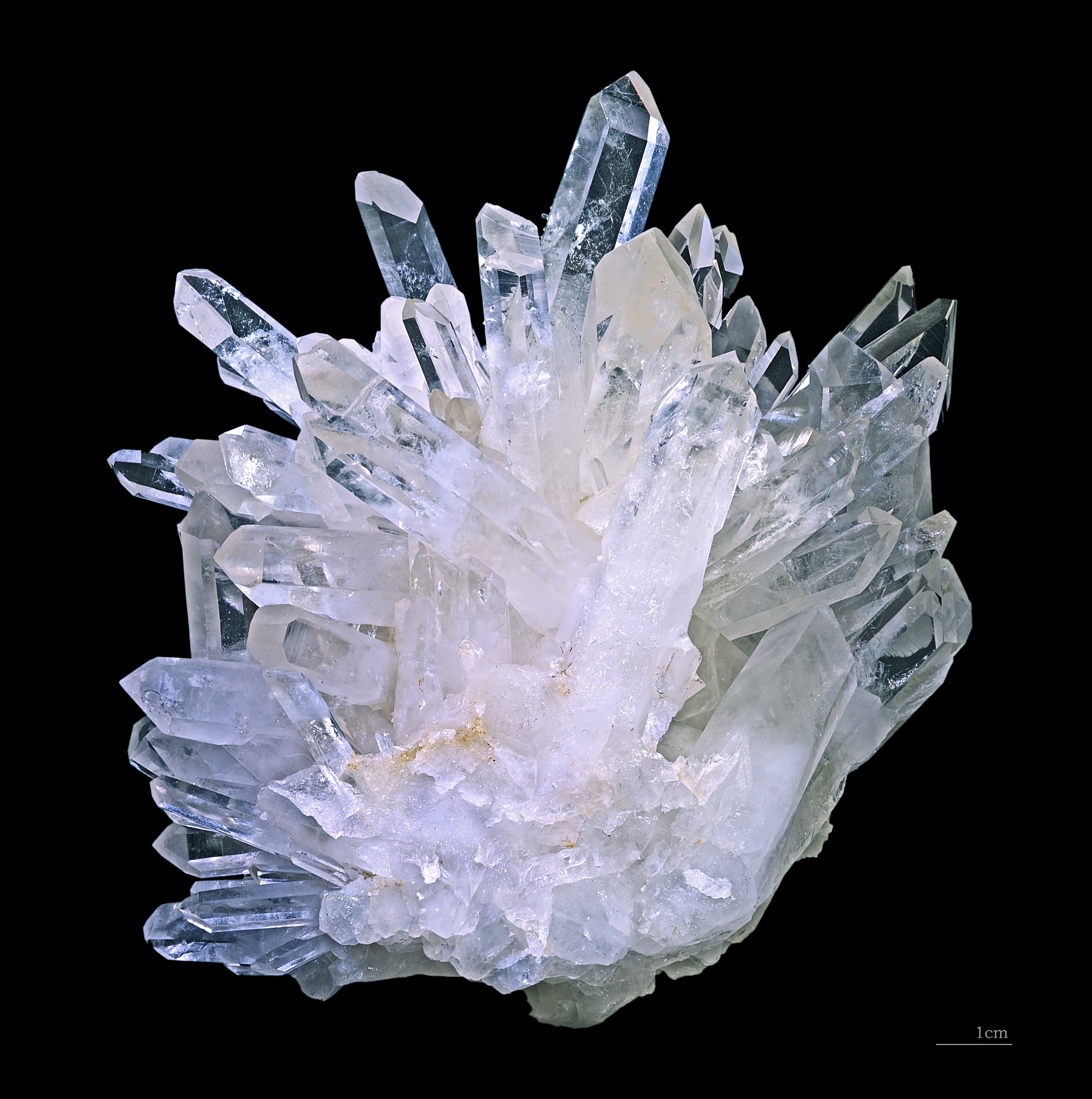
Quartz

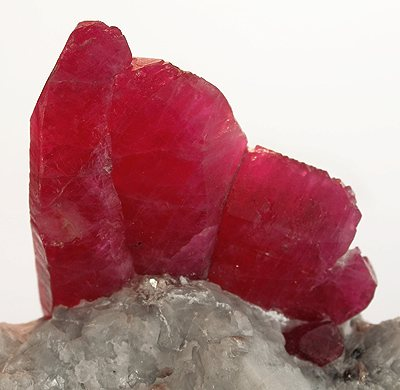
Ruby

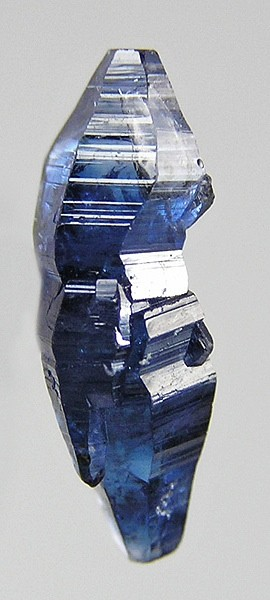
Sapphire

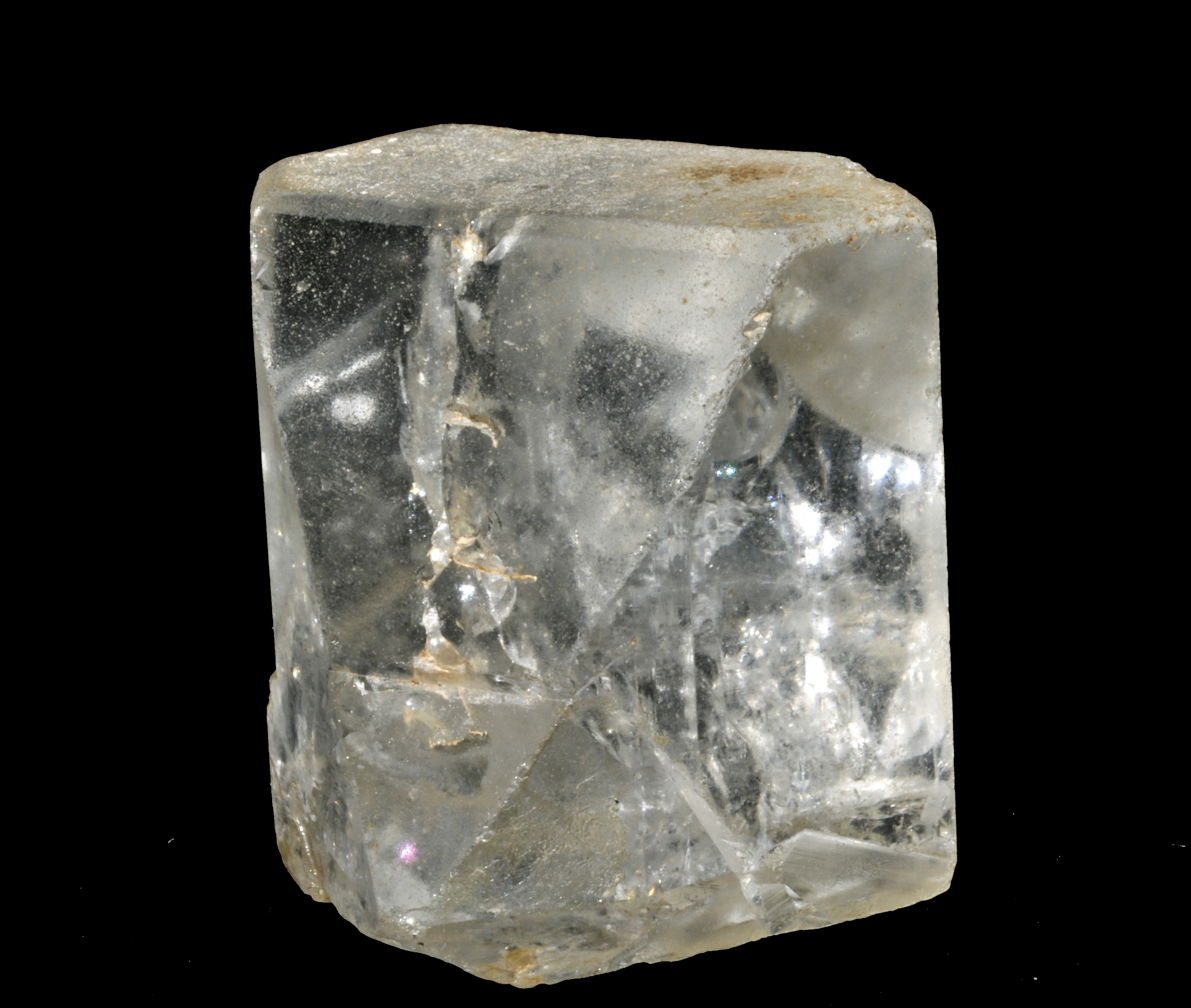
Topaz

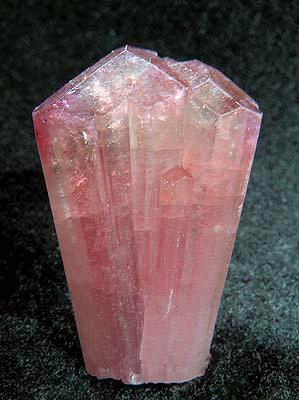
Tourmaline

== Mythological luminosity ==
Luminous gems are common theme in comparative mythology. Ball cross-culturally analyzed stories about luminous stones and pearls and found about one hundred variants in ancient, medieval, and modern sources. The wide-ranging locations of the tales comprise all Asia (except Siberia), all Europe (except Norway and Russia), Borneo, New Guinea, the United States, Canada, certain South American countries and Abyssinia, French Congo, and Angola in Africa. The later African and American myths were likely introduced by Europeans. Ball divides legends about luminous gems into three principal themes: light sources, gem mining, and animals.

=== Light source legends ===
The first theme is using legendary luminous gems to illuminate buildings, for navigation lights on ships, or sometimes as guiding lights for lost persons.

In India, the earliest country in which fine gemstones were known, belief in luminous gems dates back some twenty-five centuries. The c. 700 BCE – 300 CE Vishnu Purana states that Vishnu, in his avatar as the many-headed snake Shesha under the name Ananta ("Endless"), "has a thousand heads adorned with the mystical Swastika and in each head a jewel to give light". The c. 400 BCE – 300 CE Hindu classic Mahabharata tells the story of the five Pandava brothers and the raja Babruvahana's palace with its precious stones that "shone like lamps so that there was no need for any other light in the assembly." In the c. 100 CE Buddhacarita, the city of Kapila is said to have gems so bright "that darkness like poverty could find no place".

In Classical antiquity, the Greek historian Herodotus (c. 484–425 BCE) was the first European to describe luminous gems. The temple of Heracles at Tyre had two great columns, one of gold, the other of smaragdos (σμάραγδος, "green gems including emerald") that "shone brightly at night" (Harvey 1957: 33, suggesting the phosphorescent "false emerald" type of fluorspar). Ball says that the "wily priests doubtless enclosed a lamp in hollow green glass, to mislead the credulous". The Pseudo-Plutarch "On Rivers", probably written by the Greek grammarian Parthenius of Nicaea (d. 14 CE), states that in the Sakarya River the Aster (ἀστήρ, "star") gem is found, "which flames in the dark", and thus called Ballen (the "King") in the Phrygian language. The Roman author Pliny the Elder (23–79 CE) described the chrysolampis as an eastern gem, "pale by day but of a fiery luster by night". The Syrian rhetorician Lucian (c. 125–180 CE) describes a statue of the Syrian goddess Atargatis in Hierapolis Bambyce (present-day Manbij) with a gem on her head called Greek lychnis (λύχνος, "lamp; light"). (Schafer 1963: 237). "From this stone flashes a great light in the night-time, so that the whole temple gleams brightly as by the light of myriads of candles, but in the daytime the brightness grows faint; the gem has the likeness of a bright fire" (tr. Strong and Garstang 1913: 72). According to Pliny, the stone is called lychnis because its luster is heightened by the light of a lamp, when its tints are particularly pleasing.

Although early Chinese classics from the Eastern Zhou dynasty (770–256 BCE) refer to luminous gems (e.g., "the Marquis of Sui's pearl" discussed below under grateful animals), Sima Qian's c. 94 BCE Han dynasty Records of the Grand Historian has two early references to using them as a source of light. Most Chinese names for shining pearls/gems are compounds of zhū (珠, "pearl; gem; bead; orb"), such as yèmíngzhū (夜明珠, "night luminous pearl"), míngyuèzhū (明月珠, "luminous moon pearl"), and yèguāngzhū (夜光珠, "night shining pearl"). The "House of Tian Jingzhong" history records that in 379 BCE, King Wei of Qi boasted to King Hui of Wei, "Even a state as small as mine still has ten pearls one inch in diameter that cast radiance over twelve carriages in front and behind them."

In the biography of the Han court minister Zou Yang (鄒陽, fl. 150 BCE), he figuratively uses the terms mingyue zhi zhu (明月之珠, "luminous moon pearl") and yeguang zhi bi (夜光之壁, "night shining jade-disk") to illustrate how talented people are lost for lack of recommendations, "If I were to throw a luminous moon pearl or a night shining jade-disk on a dark road in front of someone, who would not grasp their sword and look startled?" The German sinologist August Conrady suggested that the Chinese names mingyuezhizhu and yeguangzhu may have an Indian origin, with analogs in the chandra-kânta ("moon-beloved") gem that contains condensed moonlight and the harinmaṇi ("moon-jewel") name for emerald.

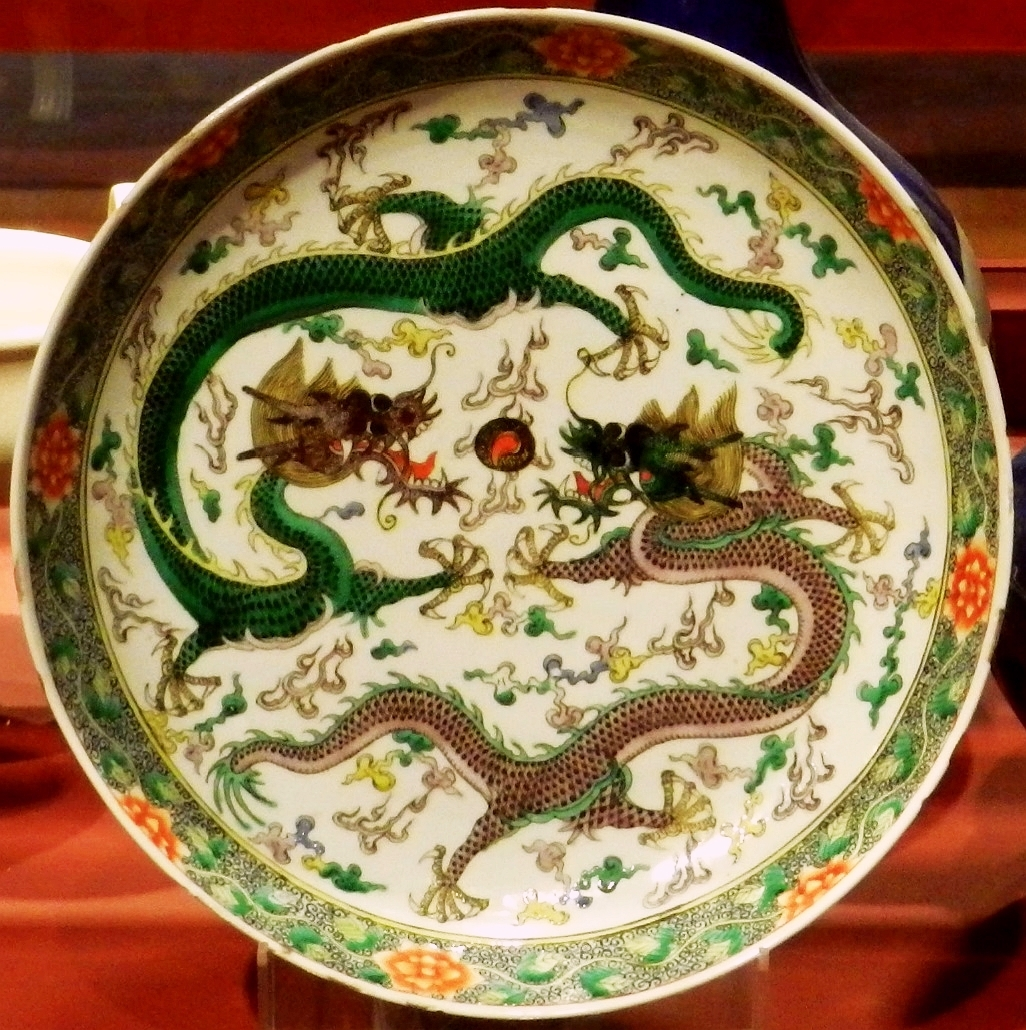
Qing dynasty plate with two dragons and a flaming pearl.

Li Shizhen's 1578 Bencao Gangmu pharmacopeia describes leizhu (雷珠, "thunder pearls/beads") that the divine dragon shenlong "held in its mouth and dropped. They light the entire house at night." Chinese dragons are frequently depicted with a flaming pearl or gem under their chin or in their claws. According to the German anthropologist Wolfram Eberhard, the long dragon is a symbol of clouds and rainstorms, and when it plays with a ball or pearl, this signifies the swallowing of the moon by the clouds or thunder in the clouds. The moon frequently appears as a pearl, and thus the dragon with the pearl is equal to the clouds with the moon. The pearl-moon relationship is expressed in the Chinese belief that at full moon pearls are solid balls and at new moon they are hollow (1968: 239, 382).

Rabbinic Judaism includes a number of references to luminous gems. For example, the first century Rabbi, Rav Huna, says he was fleeing from Roman soldiers and hid in a cave illuminated by a light that was brighter in the night and darker in the day.

The best documented of the illumination tales is that of the King of Ceylon's luminous carbuncle or ruby, first mentioned by the Greek traveler Cosmas Indicopleustes in the 6th century and thereafter described by many travelers, the latest of the 17th century. According to Indicopleustes, it was "as large as a great pine-cone, fiery red, and when seen flashing from a distance, especially if the sun's rays are playing around it, being a matchless sight". The Chinese Buddhist pilgrim Xuanzang's 646 Great Tang Records on the Western Regions locates it in the Buddha Tooth Temple near Anuradhapura, "Its magical brilliance illumines the whole heaven. In the calm of a clear and cloudless night it can be seen by all, even at a distance of a myriad li." The Song Scholar Zhao Rukuo's c. 1225 Zhu Fan Zhi ("Records of Foreign People") says, "The king holds in his hand a jewel five inches in diameter, which cannot be burnt by fire, and which shines in (the darkness of) night like a torch. The king rubs his face with it daily, and though he were passed ninety he would retain his youthful looks." Based on this incombustibility, Laufer says this night-shining jewel was probably a diamond. Others state that it "serves instead of a lamp at night", has "the appearance of a glowing fire", or of that "of a great flame of fire." Due to its luminescence, Marco Polo called it "The Red Palace Illuminator".

The English alchemist John Norton wrote a 1470 poem entitled "Ordinal, or a manual of the chemical art", in which he proposed erecting a gold bridge over the River Thames and illuminating it with carbuncles set on golden pinnacles, "A glorious thing for men to beholde". (Ashmole 1652: 27).

Boats lit by luminous gems are a variant of the illumination idea. Rabbinic Judaism had a tradition that "Noah had a luminous stone in the Ark that "shone more brightly by night than by day, thus serving to distinguish day and night when the sun and moon were shrouded by dense cloud." The Genesis Rabbah describes the Tzoar that illuminates Noah's Ark (Genesis 6:16) as a luminous gemstone (the King James Version translates as 'window'). The Mormon Book of Ether describes "sixteen small stones; and they were white and clear, even as transparent glass", being touched by God's hand so that they might "shine forth in darkness." The Jaredites placed a stone fore and aft on each ship and had "light continually" during their 344-day voyage to America.

The theme of luminous gems guiding mariners and others originated in Europe in the Middle Ages. The earliest is probably the Scandinavian saga of the Visby garnets. In the Hanseatic city Visby, on the island of Gotland, the Church of St. Nicholas had two rose windows with huge garnets in the center, overlooking the Baltic Sea. Sagas say the two gems shone at night as brightly as did the sun at noon and guided mariners safely to port. In 1361 King Valdemar IV of Denmark conquered Gotland, but his rich booty, including the marvelous garnets, sank in the ocean when the king's ship was wrecked on the Kong Karls Land islands.

The relic of the Virgin Mary's wedding ring, which according to different accounts had an onyx, amethyst, or green jasper, was supposedly brought back from the Holy Land in 996 CE. It was placed in the Church of Santa Mustiola, Clusium (modern Chiusi), Italy, and in 1473 the ring was transferred to the Franciscan monastery in that city. One of the monks stole it and fled into the night, but when he repented and promised to return it, the ring emitted a bright light by which he traveled to Perugia. The two cities fought fiercely for the possession of this sacred ring, but in 1486 the Vatican decreed the relic should be placed in the Perugia Cathedral.

The Dutch scholar Alardus of Amsterdam (1491–1544) relates the history of a luminous "chrysolampis" (χρυσόλαμπις, "gold-gleaming") gem set on a golden tablet with other valuable gemstones. Around 975, Hildegard, wife of Dirk II, Count of Holland, dedicated the tablet to Saint Adalbert of Egmond and presented it to Egmond Abbey, where the saint's body reposed. Alardus tells us that the "chrysolampis" "shone so brightly that when the monks were called to the chapel in the nighttime, they could read the Hours without any other light"; however, this brilliant gem was stolen by one of the monks and thrown into the sea.

The French chemist Marcellin Berthelot (1888) discovered an early Greek alchemical text "from the sanctuary of the temple" that says the Egyptians produced "the carbuncle that shines in the night" from certain phosphorescent parts ("the bile") of marine animals, and when properly prepared these precious gems would glow so brightly at night "that anyone owning such a stone could read or write by its light as well as he could by daylight".

=== Gem mining legends ===
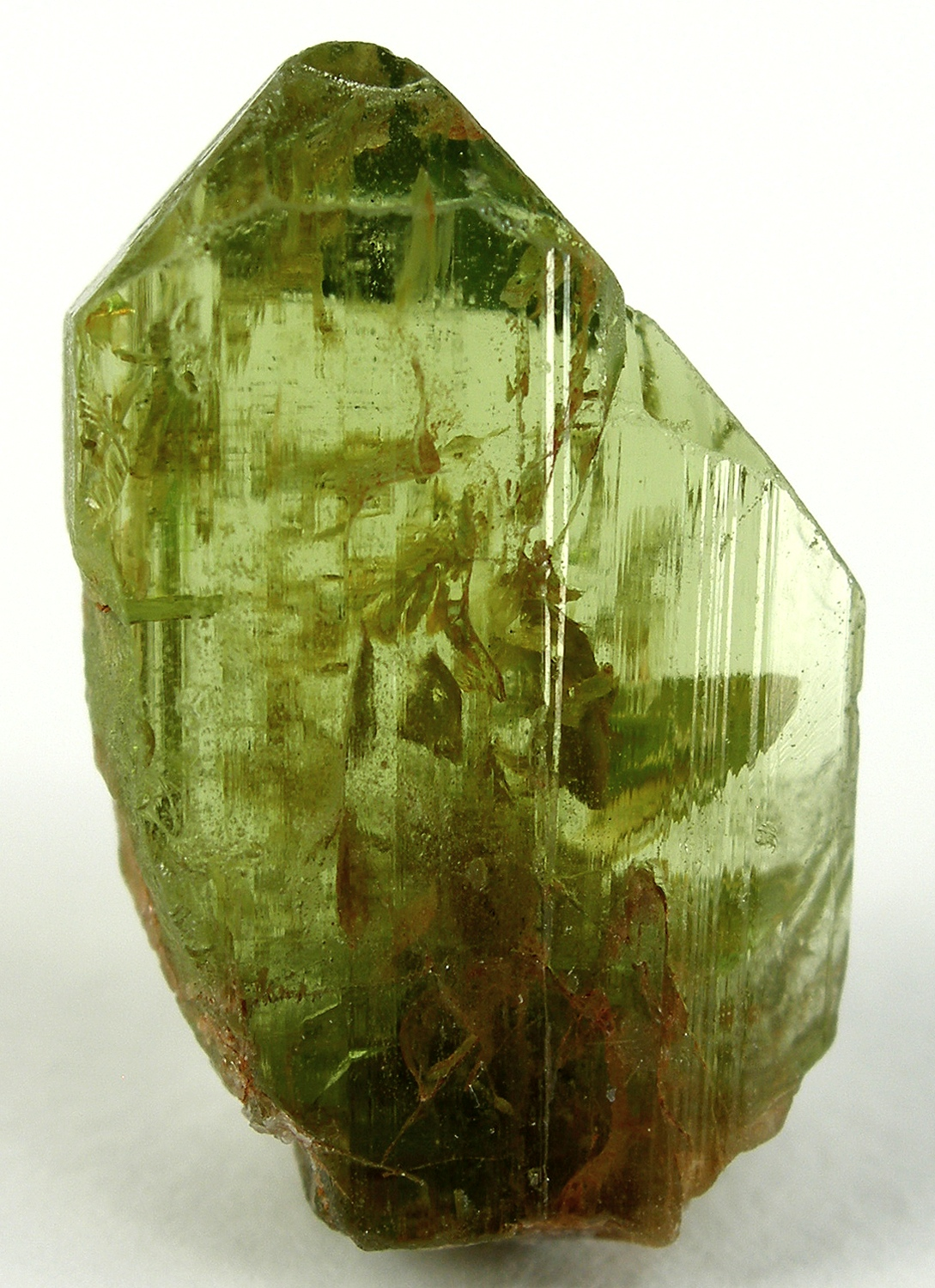
Peridot from Zabargad Island

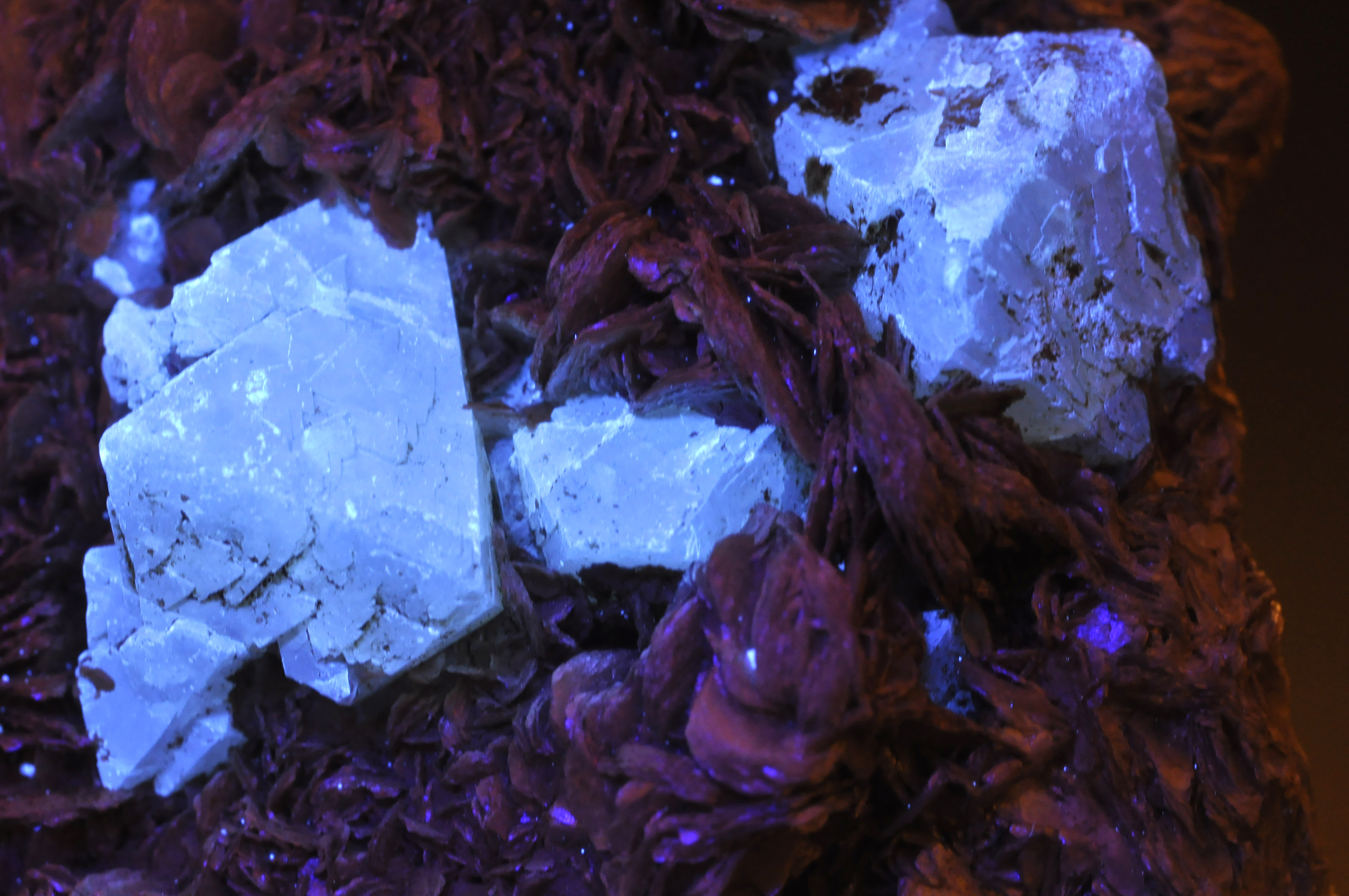
Scheelite under ultraviolet light

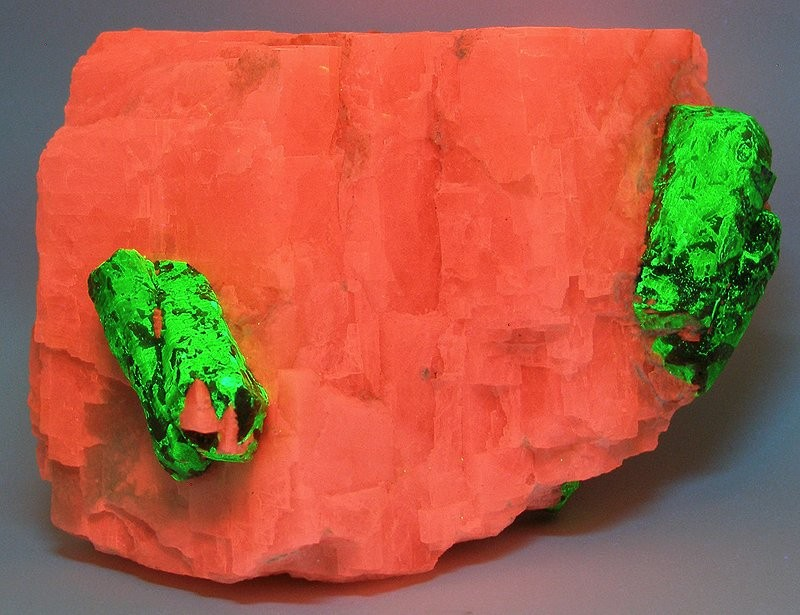
Willemite under ultraviolet light

Second, there are stories about miners finding luminous gems at night and extracting them by day. One notable exception is Pliny's c. 77 CE Natural History that describes finding carbuncles in the daytime, some kinds "doe glitter and shine of their owne nature: by reason whereof, they are discovered soone wheresoever they lie, by the reverberation of the Sun-beams".

In the 1st century BCE, the Greek historians Diodorus Siculus (c. 90–30) and Strabo (c. 63–24) both record the peridot (gem-quality olivine) mine of Egyptian king Ptolemy II Philadelphus (r. 285–246 BCE) on the barren, forbidden island of Ophiodes (Ὀφιώδηςνήσος, "Snakey") or Topazios (Τοπάζιος, "Topaz"), modern Zabargad Island, off the ancient Red Sea port Berenice Troglodytica.

Diodorus says Philadelphus exterminated the "divers sorts of dreadful Serpents" that formerly infested on the island on account of the "Topaz, a resplendent Stone, of a delightful Aspect, like to Glass, of a Golden colour, and of admirable brightness; and therefore all were forbidden to set footing upon that Place; and if any landed there, he was presently put to death by the Keepers of the Island." The Egyptian mining technique relied upon luminosity. "This Stone grows in the Rocks, darken'd by the brightness of the Sun; it's not seen in the Day, but shines bright and glorious in the darkest Night, and discovers itself at a great distance. The Keepers of the Island disperse themselves into several Places to search for this stone, and wherever it appears, they mark the Place, with a great Vessel of largeness sufficient to cover the sparkling Stone; and then in the Day time, go to the Place, and cut out the Stone, and deliver it to those that are Artists in polishing of 'em" (tr. Oldfather et al. 1814 3: 36).

According to Strabo, "The topaz is a transparent stone sparkling with a golden lustre, which, however, is not easy to be distinguished in the day-time, on account of the brightness of the surrounding light, but at night the stones are visible to those who collect them. The collectors place a vessel over the spot [where the topazes are seen] as a mark, and dig them up in the day." Ball notes that the legendary "topaz" of Topazios island is olivine, which is not luminescent while true topaz is, and suggests, "This tale may well have been told to travelers by astute Egyptian gem merchants anxious to enhance the value of their wares by exaggerating the dangers inherent to procuring the olivines". In the present day, the island mine is now submerged underwater and inaccessible.

The theme of locating luminous gems at night is found in other sources. The c. 125 CE didactic Christian text Physiologus states that the diamond ("carbuncle") is not to be found in the day but only at night, which may imply that it emits light. The Anglo-Indian diplomat Thomas Douglas Forsyth says that in 632, the ancient Iranian Saka Buddhist Kingdom of Khotan sent a "splendid jade stone" as tribute to Emperor Taizong of Tang. Khotan's rivers were famous for their jade, "which was discovered by its shining in the water at night", and divers would procure it in shallow waters after the snowmelt floods had subsided. The Bohemian rabbi Petachiah of Regensburg (d. c. 1225) adapted Strabo's story for the gold he saw in the land of Ishmael, east of Nineveh, where "the gold grows like herbs. In the night its brightness is seen when a mark is made with dust or lime. They then come in the morning and gather the herbs upon which the gold is found".

A modern parallel to ancient miners seeking luminous gems at nighttime is mineworkers using portable shortwave ultraviolet lamps to locate ores that respond with color-specific fluorescence. For instance, under short-wave UV light, scheelite, a tungsten ore, fluoresces a bright sky-blue, and willemite, a minor ore of zinc, fluoresces green.

=== Animal legends ===
The third luminous-gem theme involves serpents (of Hindu origin), or small animals (Spanish), with gems in their heads, or grateful animals repaying human kindness (Chinese and Roman).

Legends about snakes that carry a marvelous jewel either in their forehead or in their mouth are found almost worldwide. Scholars have suggested that the myth may have originated with snake worship, or light reflected by a serpent's eye, or the flame color of certain snakes' lips. In only a relative few of these legends is the stone luminous, this variant being known in India, Ceylon, ancient Greece, Armenia, and among Cherokee Indians.

The Hindu polymath Varāhamihira's 6th century Brhat Samhit encyclopedic work describes the bright star Canopus, named Agastya (अगस्त्य) in Sanskrit, also the name of the rishi Agastya, "Its huge white waves looked like clouds; its gems looked like stars; its crystals looked like the Moon; and its long bright serpents bearing gems in their hoods looked like comets and thus the whole sea looked like the sky." Another context says black glossy pearls are also produced in the heads of serpents related to the nāgarāja (नागराज, "dragon kings") Takshaka and Vasuki.

The "Snake Jewel" story in Somadeva's 11th-century Kathasaritsagara ("Ocean of the Streams of Stories") refers to a maṇi (मणि, "gem; jewel; pearl") on a snake's head. When the Hindu mythological king Nala is fleeing from a jungle wildfire, he hears a voice asking for help and turns back to see a snake "having his head encircled with the rays of the jewels of his crest", who, after being rescued reveals himself to be the nāgarāja Karkotaka.

The 3rd-century CE Life of Apollonius of Tyana, the Greek sophist Philostratus's biography of Apollonius of Tyana (c. 3 BCE – 97 CE), says that in India, people will kill a mountain dragon and cut off its head, in which, "are stones of rich lustre, emitting every-coloured rays and of occult virtue." It also mentions a myth that cranes will not build their nests until they have affixed a "light-stone" (Ancient Greek lychnidis, "shining") to help the eggs hatch and to drive away snakes.

In the Bengali tale of "The Rose of Bakáwalí", the heroic prince Jamila Khatun encounters a monstrous dragon that carried in its mouth "a serpent which emitted a gem so brilliant that it lighted up the jungle for many miles". His plan to obtain it was to throw a heavy lump of clay on the luminous gem, plunging the jungle into darkness, "so that the dragon and the serpent knocked their heads against the stones and died."

According to Armenian "The Queen of the Serpents" legend, the serpents of Mount Ararat select a queen who destroys invading armies of foreign serpents, and carries in her mouth a "wonderful stone, the Hul, or stone of light, which upon certain nights she tosses in the air, when it shines as the sun. Happy the man who shall catch the stone ere it falls."

Henry Timberlake, the British emissary to the Overhill Cherokee during the 1761–1762 Timberlake Expedition, records a story about medicine men ("conjurers") using gemstones, which is a variant of the Horned Serpent legend in Iroquois mythology. One luminous gem "remarkable for its brilliancy and beauty" supposedly "grew on the head of a monʃtrous ʃerpent" that was guarded by many snakes. The medicine man hid this luminous gemstone, and no one else had seen it. Timberlake supposed he had "hatched the account of its difcovery". Ball doubts the myth and suggests "European influence".

The Catalan missionary Jordanus's c. 1330 Mirabilia says he heard that the dragons of India Tertia (Eastern African, south of Abyssinia) have on their heads "the lustrous stones which we call carbuncles." When they become too large to fly, they fall and die in a "certain river which issues from Paradise". After seventy days the people recover the "carbuncle which is rooted in the top of his head" and take it to Prester John, the Emperor of the Ethiopians.

After his third visit to Persia in 1686, the French jeweler and traveler John Chardin wrote that the Egyptian carbuncle was "very probably only an Oriental Ruby of higher Colour than usual." The Persians call it Icheb Chirac, the Flambeau ["burning torch"] of the Night because of the property and Quality it has of enlightening all things round it", and "They tell you that the Carbuncle was bred within the Head of a Dragon, a Griffin, or a Royal Eagle, which was found upon the Mountain of Caf".

Like Chardin's griffin or eagle, some stories about luminous gems involve animals other than snakes and dragons. An early example is the 3rd-century CE Greek Pseudo-Callisthenes Romance of Alexander that says Alexander the Great once speared a fish, "in whose bowels was found a white stone so brilliant that everyone believed it was a lamp. Alexander set it in gold, and used it as a lamp at night".

Sydney H. Ball recounts the widespread variation of the animal-gratitude snake story involving a wild animal (often called carbuncle, Spanish carbunclo, or Latin carbunculo) with a luminous gem on its head, and which Europeans apparently introduced into Africa and America.

In 1565, Don John Bermudez, ambassador of Prester John to John III of Portugal, described an Upper Nile snake called "Of the shadow, or Canopie, because it hath a skinne on the head wherewith it covereth a very precious stone, which they say it hath in her head".

The English merchant William Finch reported around 1608 a Sierra Leone story about a wolf-like creature with a luminous gem. "The Negros told us of a strange beast (which the interpreter called a Carbuncle) oft seene yet only by night, having a stone in his forehead, incredibly shining and giving him light to feed, attentive to the least noyse, which he no sooner heareth, but he presently covereth the same with a filme or skinne given him as a naturall covering that his splendour betray him not".

In 1666, another version of the theme is a huge snake recorded from Island Caribs on the island of Dominica, West Indies. "On its head was a very sparkling stone, like a Carbuncle, of inestimable price: That it commonly veil'd that rich Jewel with a thin moving skin, like that of a man's eye-lid: but that when it went to drink or sported himself in the midst of that deep bottom, he fully discover'd it, and that the rocks and all about receiv'd a wonderful lustre from the fire issuing out of that precious crown".

According to the Swiss explorer Johann Jakob von Tschudi, in the highlands of Peru and Bolivia, the native peoples tell stories of a fabulous beast with a luminous gem. "The carbunculo is represented to be of the size of a fox, with long black hair, and is only visible at night, when it slinks slowly through the thickets. If followed, he opens a flap or valve in the forehead, from under which an extraordinary, brilliant, and dazzling light issues. The natives believe that this light proceeds from a brilliant precious stone, and that any fool hardy person who may venture to grasp at it rashly is blinded; then the flap is let down, and the animal disappears in the darkness". The American archeologist Adolph Francis Alphonse Bandelier cites von Tschudi and describes the carbunculo as a cat with a blood-red jewel, which is supposed to dwell on Nevado Sajama mountain, near Oruro, Bolivia. Bandelier believes his Bolivian informants that the carbunculo has existed from the earliest times, and "certainly before the conquest, so that its introduction cannot be attributed to the Spaniards". Nevertheless, based upon how closely the above American versions of the myth follow the pattern of the European form, Ball concludes that the Spaniards introduced the carbuncle myth.

In contrast to the above legends about people killing snakes and animals in order to obtain their luminous gems, another group of legends has a theme of injured animals presenting magical gems out of gratitude to people who helped them. This is a subcategory of The Grateful Animals folktale motif (Aarne–Thompson classification systems 554), for example, The White Snake or The Queen Bee.

These animal-gratitude stories are first recorded around two millennia ago in China and Rome. Based upon striking coincidences in Chinese and Roman versions of the story, Laufer reasoned that there was an obvious historical connection, and Ball believes these tales probably originated independently.

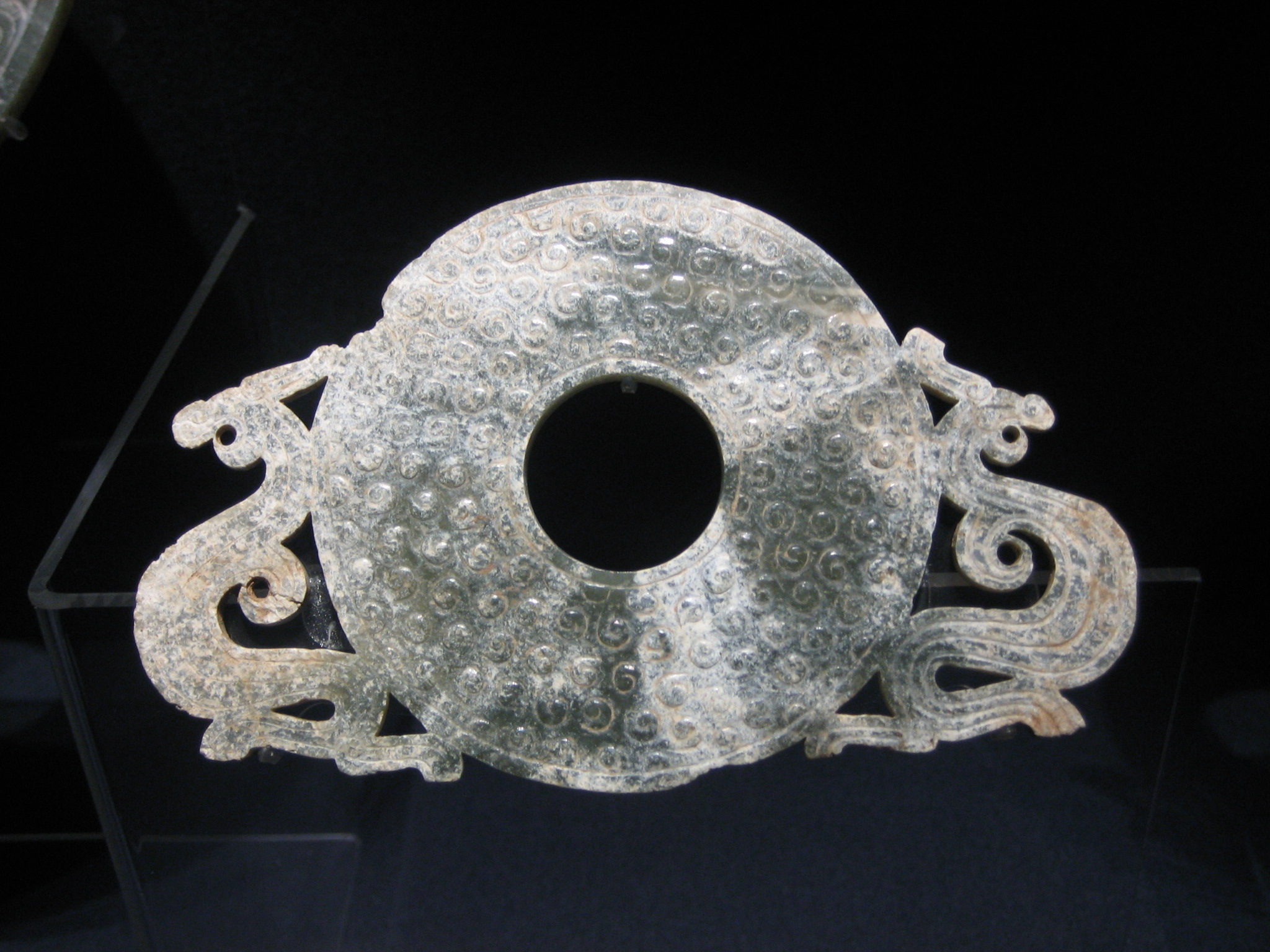
Bi jade-disk with a dual dragon motif, Warring States period.

The earliest known story about a grateful animal with a luminous gem is the Chinese Suihouzhu (隨侯珠, "the Marquis of Sui's pearl") legend that a year after he saved the life of a wounded snake, it returned and gave him a fabulous pearl that emitted a light as bright as that of the moon. Sui (隨, cf. 隋 Sui dynasty), located in present-day Suizhou, Hubei, was a lesser feudal state during the Zhou dynasty (c. 1046 BCE – 256 BCE) and a vassal state of Chu. Several Warring States period (c. 475–221 BCE) texts mention Marquis Sui's pearl as a metaphor for something important or valuable, but without explaining the grateful snake tale, which implies that it was common knowledge among contemporary readers.

The Marquis of Sui's pearl is mentioned in the Zhanguo ci ("Strategies of the Warring States") compendium of political and military anecdotes dating from 490 to 221 BCE. King Wuling of Zhao (r. 325–299 BCE) summoned Zheng Tong (鄭同) for an audience and asked how to avoid warfare with neighboring feudal states. Zheng Tong replied, 'Well, let us suppose there is a man who carries with him the pearl of Sui-hou and the Ch'ih-ch'iu armband [持丘之環, uncertain] as well as goods valued at ten thousand in gold. Now he stops the night in an uninhabited place." Since he has neither weapons nor protectors, "It is clear he will not spend more than a night abroad before someone harms him. At the moment there are powerful and greedy states on your majesty's borders and they covet your land. ... If you lack weapons your neighbours, of course, will be quite satisfied".

The c. 3rd–1st centuries BCE Daoist Zhuangzi alludes to the marquis's pearl. "Whenever the sage makes a movement, he is certain to examine what his purpose is and what he is doing. If now, however, we suppose that there were a man who shot at a sparrow a thousand yards away with the pearl of the Marquis of Sui, the world would certainly laugh at him. Why is this? It is because what he uses is important and what he wants is insignificant. And is not life much more important than the pearl of the Marquis of Sui?".

Several Chinese classics pair the legendary Suihouzhu ("the Marquis of Sui's pearl") with another priceless gem, the Heshibi (和氏璧, "Mr. He's jade"). The bi is a type of circular Chinese jade artifact, and "Mr. He" was Bian He (卞和), who found a marvelous piece of raw jade that went cruelly unrecognized by successive Chu monarchs until it was finally acknowledged as a priceless jewel. The c. 3rd–1st century BCE Chuci ("Songs of Chu") mentions the paired gems, "Shards and stones are prized as jewels / Sui and He rejected". This poetic anthology also says, "It grieves me that shining pearls [明珠] should be cast out in the mire / While worthless fish-eye stones are treasured in a strong-box", and describes a flying chariot, "Fringed with the dusky Moon Bright pearls [明月之玄珠]". King Liu An's c. 139 BCE Huainanzi ("Philosophers of Huainan") uses the story to describe one who has attained the Way of Heaven (天道), "It is like the pearl of Marquis Sui or the jade disk of Mr. He. Those who achieved it became rich; those who lost it became poor".

The c. 222 CE De Natura Animalium ("On the Characteristics of Animals"), compiled by Roman author Claudius Aelianus, told the story of Heraclea or Herakleis, a virtuous widow of Tarentum, who after seeing a fledgling stork fall and break its leg, nursed it back to health, and set it free. One year later, as Heraclea sat at the door of her cottage, the young stork returned and dropped a precious stone into her lap, and she put it indoors. Awakening that night, she saw that the gem "diffused a brightness and a gleam, and the house was lit up as though a torch had been brought in, so strong a radiance came from, and was engendered by, the lump of stone".

Laufer cites three c. 4th-century Chinese grateful-animal stories that parallel Heraclea's stork. The Shiyi ji ("Researches into Lost Records"), compiled by the Daoist scholar Wang Jia (d. 390 CE) from early apocryphal versions of Chinese history, recounts an anecdote about King Zhao of Yan (燕昭王, r. 311–279 BCE) and grateful birds with dongguangzhu (洞光珠, "cave shining pearls").

When Prince Chao of Yen was once seated on a terrace, black birds with white heads flocked there together, holding in their beaks perfectly resplendent pearls, measuring one foot all round. These pearls were black as lacquer, and emitted light in the interior of a house to such a degree that even the spirits could not obscure their supernatural essence."

The imperial historian Gan Bao's c. 350 CE Soushen Ji ("In Search of the Supernatural") has two grateful-animal stories involving luminous pearls/gems. The first involves a black crane; according to legend, when a crane has lived a thousand years it turns blue; after another thousand it becomes black and is called a xuanhe (玄鶴. "dark crane").

Kuai Shen [噲參] was the most filial son to his mother. Once a black crane was injured by a bow hunter and in its extremity, went to Kuai. The latter took it in, doctored its wound, and when it was cured set it free. Soon afterwards the crane showed up again outside Kuai's door. The latter shone a torch to see out and discovered its mate there too. Each of them held a single night-glowing pearl [明珠] in its beak to repay Kuai.

The second story is oldest detailed explanation of Marquis of Sui's pearl.

Once upon a time, when the ruler of the old Sui kingdom was journeying, he came upon a great wounded serpent whose back was broken. The ruler believed the creature to be a spirit manifestation and ordered his physician to treat it with drugs to close up its wound. Thereafter the serpent was able to move again, and the place was called Mound of the Wounded Serpent. One year later the serpent brought a bright pearl [明珠] in its mouth to give the ruler of Sui to show its gratitude. The pearl was greater than an inch in diameter, of the purest white and emitted light like moonglow. In the dark it could illuminate an entire room. For these reasons it was known as "Duke Sui's Pearl" [隋侯珠] or the "Spirit Snake's Pearl" [靈蛇珠], or, again, the "Moonlight Pearl" [明月珠].

Laufer concludes that the "coincidences in these three Chinese versions and the story of the Greek author, even in unimportant details such as the thankful bird returning after one year to the marquis of Sui, are so striking, that an historical connection between the two is obvious".

A later elaboration of animal-gratitude stories involves grateful animals and ungrateful people, who are typically rescued from a pitfall trap. Two versions mention marvelous gems. The English historian Matthew Paris's c. 1195 Chronicles says that Richard I of England (1157–1199) used to tell a parable about ungrateful people. A Venetian, Vitalis, was rescued from a horrible death by a ladder being let down into a pit into which he had fallen. A lion and a serpent trapped in the same pit used his ladder to escape, and the lion in gratitude brought to Vitalis a goat he had killed and the snake a luminous jewel that he carried in his mouth. As Richard reportedly told the story after his return from the Crusades he may have heard it in the East, as similar stories, but without the stone being luminous, occur in two Indian collections, the c. 300 BCE Kalila wa Dimnah and the 11th-century Kathasaritsagara.

The English poet John Gower's 1390 Confessio Amantis tells the story of the rich Roman lord Adrian and the poor woodcutter Bardus. Adrian falls into a pit that had already captured an ape and a serpent, and promises to give half his wealth to Bardus for pulling him out. After Bardus rescues the three, out of gratitude the ape piled up firewood for him and the serpent gave him "a stone more bright than cristall out of his mouth", but Adrian refuses to pay his debt. Bardus sells the luminous gem for gold and afterwards found it again in his purse, and the same thing happened every time he sold it. Emperor Justinian I summons Bardus, listens to his testimony supported by the magically reappearing gem, and compels Adrian to fulfill his promise.

Some scholars were skeptical about luminous gem stories. In the West, the earliest nonbeliever was the Portuguese traveler to India and gem expert, Garcia de Orta (1563), who, having been told by a jeweler of a luminous carbuncle, doubted its existence. In the East, the first recorded skeptic was the Chinese encyclopedist Song Yingxing, who in 1628 wrote "it is not true that there are pearls emitting light at the hour of the dusk or night".

== See also ==
- Cintamani, a wish-fulfilling jewel in Hindu and Buddhist traditions
- Indra's net, Buddhist metaphor of a vast net with a jewel or pearl at each knot, infinitely reflecting all the other jewels
- Mani Jewel, various legendary jewels mentioned in Buddhist texts
- Silmarils, three fictional light-emitting jewels in J. R. R. Tolkien's legendarium

== Sources ==
- Ashmole, Elias (1652), Theatrum Chemicum Britannicum: containing severall poeticall pieces of our famous English philosophers, who have written the hermetique mysteries in their owne ancient language, Nath Brooks.
- Conrady, August (1931). Erkes, Eduard (ed.). Das älteste Dokument zur Chinesischen Kunstgeschichte Tianwen. T'ien-wen; die 'Himmelsfragen' des K'üh Yüan [The oldest document on Chinese art history Tianwen. T'ien-wen; the 'Heavenly Questions' of K'üh Yüan] (in German). Leipzig, Germany: Verlag Asia Major – via Arhive.org.
- De Ment, Jack (1949), Handbook of Fluorescent Gems and Minerals – An Exposition and Catalog of the Fluorescent and Phosphorescent Gems and Minerals, Including the Use of Ultraviolet Light in the Earth Sciences, Mineralogist Publishing Company.
- Eberhard, Wolfram (1968), The Local Cultures of South and East China, Alide Eberhard, tr. Lokalkulturen im alten China, 1943, E.J. Brill.
- Forsyth, Thomas Douglas (1875), Report of a Mission to Yarkund in 1873, Under Command of Sir T. D. Forsyth: With Historical and Geographical Information Regarding the Possessions of the Ameer of Yarkund, Foreign Department Press.
- Hill, John (2015), Through the Jade Gate – China to Rome (A Study of the Silk Routes 1st to 2nd Centuries CE), revised edition, 2 vols., BookSurge.
- Jordanus, Friar (1863). Mirabilia Descripta: The Wonders of the East. Translated by Henry Yule. Hakluyt Society.
- Kunz, George Frederick (1913). The Curious Lore Of Precious Stones. Universal Digital Library. Halcyon House. p. 163.
- Lucian, tr. by Herbert A. Strong and John Garstang (1913) The Syrian Goddess, Constable and Co.
- Mair, Victor H. (1994). Wandering on the Way: Early Taoist Tales and Parables of Chuang Tzu. New York: Bantam. ISBN 0-553-37406-0 – via Google Books.
- Siculus, Diodorus, tr. by C.H. Oldfather et al. (1814), The Historical Library of Diodorus the Sicilian in Fifteen Books to which are added the Fragments of Diodorus, Edward Jones.
- Skippon, Philip (1732), "An Account of a Journey made through Part of the Low Countries, Germany, Italy, and France about 1663-5," Churchill's Voyages,
