= Prehistory of New England =

Prehistory of American region

The prehistory of New England is an important topic of research for New England archaeologists. Humans reached the current-day New England region by at least 10,500 years ago and likely earlier, occupying a recently de-glaciated environment. Pre-contact Native American groups in New England did not have full-fledged market economies and physical artifacts tended to change very slowly. However, technological shifts brought agriculture and ceramics to the region prior to the arrival of European settlers in the 17th century.

== Environmental changes and early human presence ==
The Wisconsinian glacial retreat at the end of the Pleistocene began 15,000 years ago in New England. Pollen and sediment studies have indicated a shifting climate pattern in New England in the Pleistocene, with dramatic climatic changes between warm periods and ice ages. A preserved peat layer beneath glacial till in Millbury, Massachusetts, contains oak, sweet gum and pine pollen dated to 38,000 years ago and Boston Harbor sediments of similar age contain extensive shellfish, indicative of warmer temperatures than today.

Radiocarbon dating of caribou collagen in Dutchess County, New York is evidence of human arrival in the Northeast by 12,530 years ago, with the oldest confirmed sites in Maine and the Connecticut River valley marking the start of the Early Archaic period.

At the start of the Holocene, the post-glacial tundra landscape of New England was covered in lichen, shrubs and moss around the shores of glacial lakes. However, forests returned quickly and pine pollen has been discovered in ponds in southeastern Massachusetts dating to 13,500 years ago. Pine, hemlock and oak colonized the landscape by 11,000 years ago. One of the oldest signs of human presence in the area, the Bull Brook site in Ipswich, Massachusetts, dates to 10,500 years ago.

== Early Archaic period ==
Initially, some researchers thought the period from 9000 to 8000 years ago marked a gap in human presence. Pollen data suggests a spruce-pine boreal forest similar to those that cover much of Quebec and Ontario. Thick, boreal forest vegetation blocks sunlight, limiting undergrowth, small animal populations and overall carrying capacity. Research at Cree sites at Lake Mistassini in Quebec showed that human populations could survive in a boreal environment. In the Early Archaic, human activity may have concentrated in widening river mouths, with coastal breezes moderating temperatures and added sunlight.

By 6000 BP, boreal forest disappeared in southern New England and forest fires may have opened tracts of northern New England to hardwood oak forestation. Glacial Lake Sudbury remained for several thousand years in the early Holocene, forming part of an internal waterway Boston Harbor to Narragansett Bay. Early Archaic artifacts include atl-atls, rhyolite biface tools, slug-shaped scrapers and other types of stone tools.

== Middle Archaic ==
Middle Archaic human presence left more extensive physical remains than the Early Archaic, including a 90 square meter house floor at one site, ulu stone knives, perforators and the first evidence of a red ochre burial of a middle-aged woman, unearthed in 1977. Yellow-brow limonite soil is oxidized red hematite by fire, leaving evidence of hearths. Excavations in Westborough found pits of charred lambsquarter seeds, stored as a winter protein source, along with oak, sycamore, sweet fern, water lily, huckleberry and blackberry seeds.

New England has only one native chert deposit, interbedded with limestone in Cumberland, Rhode Island. Middle Archaic people in southern New England relied on Braintree argillite for tools, mining in the Blue Hills. Lithic fragments also include Lynn Volcanics in the Boston Basin, chert quarried in eastern New York and felsite from Maine and New Hampshire. Pecking and grinding tools were mostly made out of granite.

Some archaeologists in the late 20th century originally proposed that Middle Archaic people were Paleo-Eskimos who migrated north following caribou herds, but later research debunked this idea.

== Late Archaic ==
Human populations increased in the Late Archaic and after 4500 BP, use of quartz rapidly increased in southern New England. Quartz flakes, turtle bone scatters, charcoal pits, trash pits and pots mark the population growth. Native Americans in the Late Archaic used wild ginseng, growing along rivers, as a remedy along with jimson weed and amanita mushrooms. Corn and tobacco were introduced from outside the region. High quality quartz crystals increasingly appeared at sites in the Late Archaic, different from the conchoidally fractured crystals common in New England, suggesting a possible ritual use.

As the coastlines stabilized at their present locations, larger shellfish beds built in more predictable locations.

== Archaic–Woodland transition ==
The 1000 years after the Archaic are debated by archaeologists. From Maine to Georgia, the practice of burying the dead with red ochre powder mixed with animal fat became commonplace. The deceased were cremated and buried with soapstone bowls, broadspears, gouges, axes and occasionally native copper. Burial sites are commonly found in river plains. New species such as goosefoot and amaranth appeared in the region, but were not clearly domesticated. Ragweed pollen increases in sediment cores from Lake Nippeneckit in southeastern Massachusetts, suggesting artificial burning and clearing of forests. Soapstone—steatite—mining became much more common, but the heaviness of tools may have limited groups from moving and prompting more dependence on trade with groups near steatite, argillite and basalt deposits. With steatite mines in southern Worcester County, the Quinebaug and Blackstone River became a major trading route with Narragansett Bay. Dugout canoes are speculated to be the means of transportation.

== Woodland period ==
There is evidence of climate cooling 3000 to 1000 years ago in New England and the water table may have risen with increased precipitation. Oak and hemlock lost out to shrubs and forest-edge trees, suggesting widespread burning of forests. Some settlements may have shifted closer to the coast. Some archaeologists have proposed that the advent of ceramics during the period changed gender roles.

The Middle Woodland marked a shift toward greater food storage, with more extensive storage pits and large roasting and smoking racks at the Wheeler site and Shattuck Farm Site. Jasper entered the region from Pennsylvania and Hopewellian artifacts appeared. At the Bullen and Shattuck Farm sites, graphite is strongly associated with Middle Woodland artifacts.

By the Late Woodland, New England's climate was virtually identical to the present, although widespread burning of underbrush created large meadows. Between 1000 and 1200 years ago, frost-resistant corn was imported to the region, driving a shift toward more sedentary lifeways.

== Archaeological research ==
From the 1960s onward, thermoluminescence dating has offered a secondary way of dating non-organic material, but analysis requires the destruction of samples at high cost and a scarcity of potsherds complicates this form of research.

Understanding of New England prehistory is closely related to archaeological research in the region. Archaeologists have debated whether soil microstratigraphy has a role in dating artifacts. Tilling of farmland, roots, animal burrows and the annual freeze-thaw cycle all work to bring some artifacts closer to the surface. By 1990, archaeologists had gathered 300 radiocarbon dates from different sites, with some gaps between 9000 and 8000 years ago and 7000 to 5500 years ago.
