= Mooney Site =

The Mooney site (Smithsonian trinomial: 21NR29) is a precontact Native American archaeological site on the Red River Levee in Norman County, Minnesota, US. It is a multicomponent site consisting of remains from both the Archaic and Woodland traditions. No diagnostic Archaic artifacts were found. However, animal remains and lithic materials recovered from one meter below the Woodland artifacts returned a carbon 14 date that provided the basis for the Archaic classification. The Woodland tradition is defined by a vertical scatter of materials, dated to about 1000 using thermoluminescence methods. Many animal bones were found at the site, reflecting a great emphasis on a wide range of hunting activity that focused on bison. Artifacts such as local and exotic lithic materials were found, as well as a wide variety of pottery and other ceramic remains. Much of the pottery followed the Sandy Lake model; however, some artifacts were placed in a new class of artisanship known as Red River Ware.

== Site information ==
The Mooney site is a very large archaeological site, around 109 square meters, located in Norman County of northwest Minnesota. Its northern tip is located one hundred and fifty meters south of the Red River. It is a multicomponent site spanning the Plains Archaic and Woodland Periods which date to approximately 3400–940 B.P. It has produced evidence of big and small game hunting as well as fishing. It reflects at least two settlements over an unknown period of time but including a warm-season occupation. All but five acres (20,000 m^{2}) of the site's surface have been disturbed by plowing. The northwestern and southern tips of the site were destroyed many years ago when soil was taken and used, for dike construction. Artifacts can still be found on the dike near the south side.

== Woodland evidence ==
The Woodland remains show at least two settlements over an unknown amount of time; however, it is known that this time included some warm seasons. The majority of artifacts recovered from the Woodland period were pottery. Pottery was discovered at 1825 locations and at least 68 vessels are represented by the remains. Fifty-one of the vessels are thought to belong to a pottery classification known as Salt Lake ware. Salt Lake ware is a well known ceramic style common to central and eastern Minnesota and is defined by its straight rim and chord marked decoration style. Six other vessels are thought to belong to a style of pottery known as Sandy Lake Plain, which differs only slightly from the more abundant Salt Lake ware. Its only difference is a stick impressed decoration trend. However, thirteen vessels found at the Mooney site are very different than both the Sandy Lake Plain style and the Salt Lake style. The 6 odd vessels were given a new classification known as Red River ware and are distinguished by a rolled lip. Despite the large number of pottery found, lithic materials were scarce. Less than three hundred total stone tools and pieces of lithic debris were found. Of those, only 255 artifacts were from the Woodland period, which is the period from which the majority of the recovered pottery at the site dates. This puts the pottery to lithics remains at an astounding 5/1 ratio. The majority of the few stone remains found were made of native Swan River Chert and quartz. However, some exotic materials were found such as a piece of obsidian. In all, only three different kinds of stone tools were found at the site: bifaces, scrapers, and utilized flakes.

== Archaic Evidence ==
At 140–160 cm below ground, twenty four flakes and a spread of bone were found whose carbon date is around 3400 B.P. This date provides the basis for the Archaic classification of the artifacts, despite the fact that no tools or pottery had been found that linked the site to that tradition. The trail of human interaction was obvious with the findings of bone chips highly characteristic of hunting. There were also burnt bone chips and charcoal found at this depth, showing fire and cooking activities. Some bone fragments were identified as bison bone. This, matched with the other faunal remains found at the site, showed that the people that inhabited this area relied heavily on bison. This gives a strong connection between the Mooney site and all other Archaic sites in the area, such as Lockport and Cemetery point, as the primary subsistence source in all locations were bison.

== Regional environment ==
The site is located in the Red River Valley near the middle portion of the Red River. The valley coincides with the southern extensions of the Lake Agassiz Plain. The valley is very flat and surrounded by beach deposits left by an ancient lake some 13,000-9,000 years ago. The Red River flows north to Lake Winnipeg, Manitoba. The levees of the river range to about 10 meters above the normal water level. The climate is continental with warm summers, about 21 degrees Celsius in July, and cold winters, about 13 degrees Celsius. It is predominantly prairie grassland. Around 95% of the valley was prairie before farming. In prehistoric times these large prairies supported large herds of buffalo that made life possible for the ancient peoples of the area. The other 5% of the land consisted of many gallery forests made up of elms, ash and oak that lined many waterways.

== Excavation ==
The Mooney site was excavated in June and July, 1983. The excavation was conducted by a small crew of eleven people and was headed by Dr. Michael G. Michlovic of Moorhead State University. The original excavation of the area was to be conducted in what is now the middle of the Mooney site. However, when the engineers dug the centerline of the proposed dike they found a great array of cultural debris. Deep tests (41*1 m units) showed that there was a deep component at the site directly below the proposed dike. This deep component is around 1.5m below the ground. The soil in this region is thick, poorly draining soil making the upper levels very difficult to get through, and reaching ones desired depth is very strenuous. As a result, the archeologist chose to use a backhoe to reach the deep undisturbed cultural levels at the site. The excavated soil was screened using 1/4” hardware cloth mesh because 1/4” is the smallest mesh that can be used on Red River clay. Of the 102 square meters at the Mooney site, 29 square meters were excavated. The excavation depth was approximately 160 cm. However, some units were excavated to slightly varying depths, averaging between 50–70 cm depending on the nature of the find. When all was said and done, nearly 85 cubic meters had been excavated, excluding the work of the backhoe.
