= Chlorophane =

Variety of the mineral fluorite

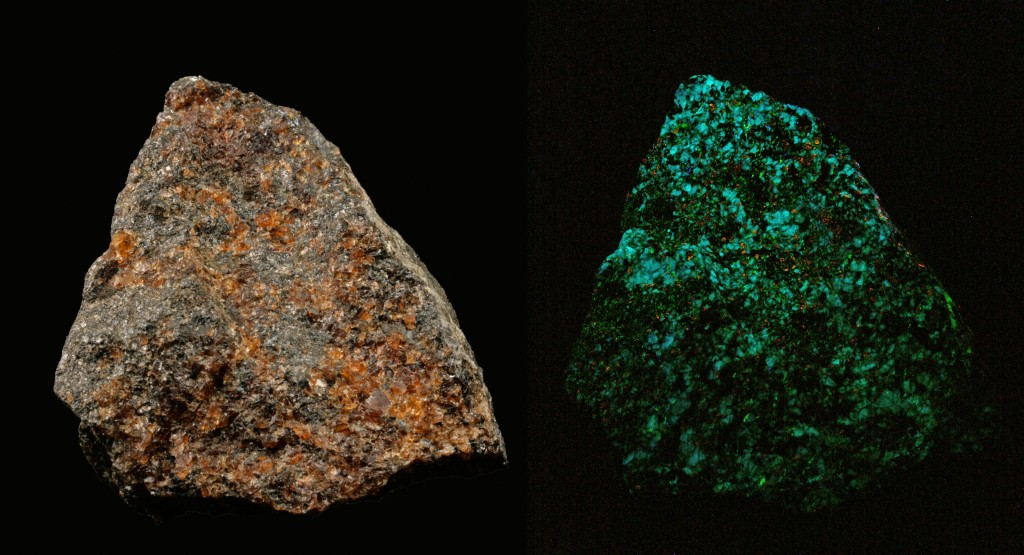
- Chlorophane, from Franklin Furnace, Franklin, New Jersey, US.

General
- Category: Halide mineral
- Formula: CaF_{2}
- Strunz classification: 3.AB.25
- Crystal system: Isometric
- Crystal class: Hexoctahedral (m3̅m); H–M symbol: (4/m 3̅ 2/m) (cF12)
- Space group: Fm3̅m (No. 225)
- Unit cell: a = 5.4626 Å; Z = 4

Identification
- Color: White, reddish pink or red (fluorescence/ phosphorescence in emerald green)
- Crystal habit: Well-formed coarse sized crystals; also nodular, botryoidal, rarely columnar or fibrous; granular, massive
- Twinning: Common on {111}, interpenetrant, flattened
- Cleavage: Octahedral, perfect on {111}, parting on {011}
- Fracture: Subconchoidal to uneven
- Tenacity: Brittle
- Mohs scale hardness: 4 (defining mineral)
- Luster: Vitreous
- Streak: White
- Specific gravity: 3.175–3.184; to 3.56 if high in rare-earth elements
- Optical properties: Isotropic; weak anomalous anisotropism
- Refractive index: 1.433–1.448
- Fusibility: 3
- Solubility: slightly water soluble and in hot hydrochloric acid

Chlorophane, also sometimes known as pyroemerald, cobra stone, and pyrosmaragd, is a rare variety of the mineral fluorite with the unusual combined properties of thermoluminescence, thermophosphoresence, triboluminescence, and fluorescence: it will emit light in the visible spectrum when exposed to ultraviolet light, when heated, and when rubbed; if heated, it will continue to emit light for a period of time after a heat source is withdrawn. The small amount of heat generated by being held in the hand has been reported as enough to induce luminescence, though this may be the result of experimental error. Although chemically very similar to fluorite, chlorophane has several impurities including magnesium, aluminum, manganese, and traces of iron and sodium (none of which occur in fluorite). As of 2013 it was still not known which if any of these impurities imparts to chlorophane the luminescent properties that distinguish it from fluorite. Some samples of chlorophane, particularly those exposed to high temperatures, will only luminesce once or will do so with only weakened intensity over time. A very bright luminescence can be achieved at between 200 °C (392 °F) and 300 °C (572 °F), and mineralogists once believed that it would glow indefinitely at temperatures of just 30 °C (86 °F), meaning that when exposed on the ground in warmer climates, the mineral would glow year-round. This effect, which was reported many times without having been observed, was eventually attributed in part to a combination of both heat and light acting on the mineral.

The unusual properties of chlorophane have been attributed to samarium, terbium, dysprosium, gadolinium, ytterbium, and yttrium; none of these rare earth elements, however, has been consistently found in all chlorophane specimens.
