= Thermoluminescence =

Light from the re-emission of absorbed energy when a substance is heated

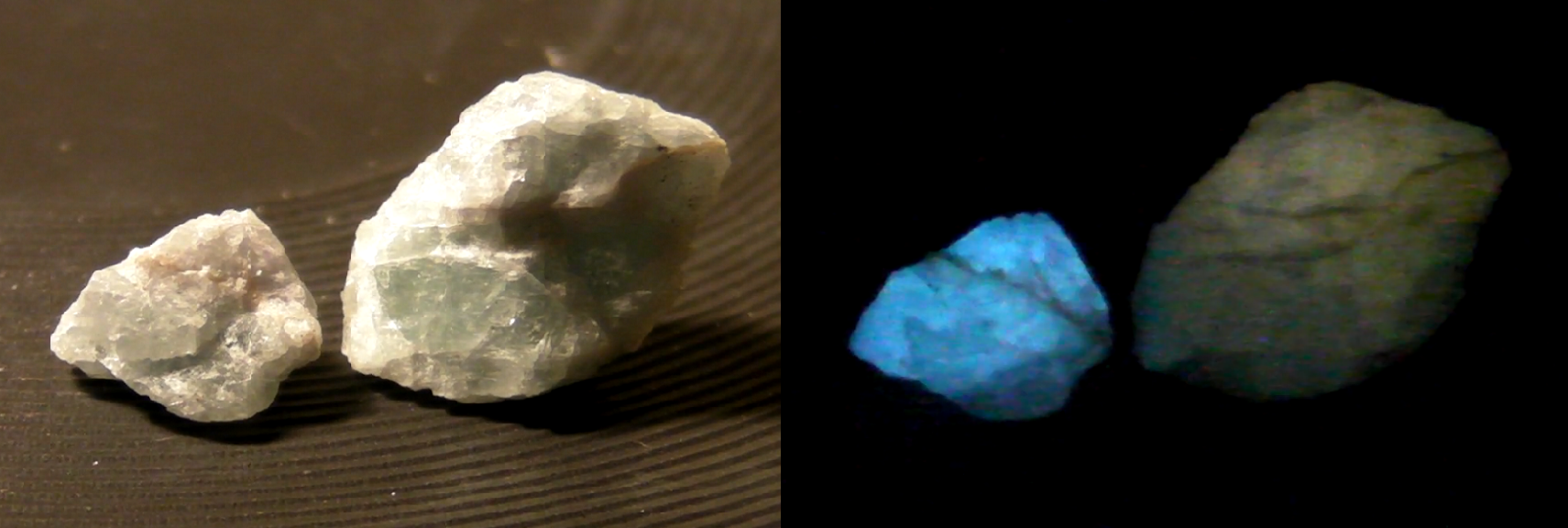
Thermoluminescence of fluorite.

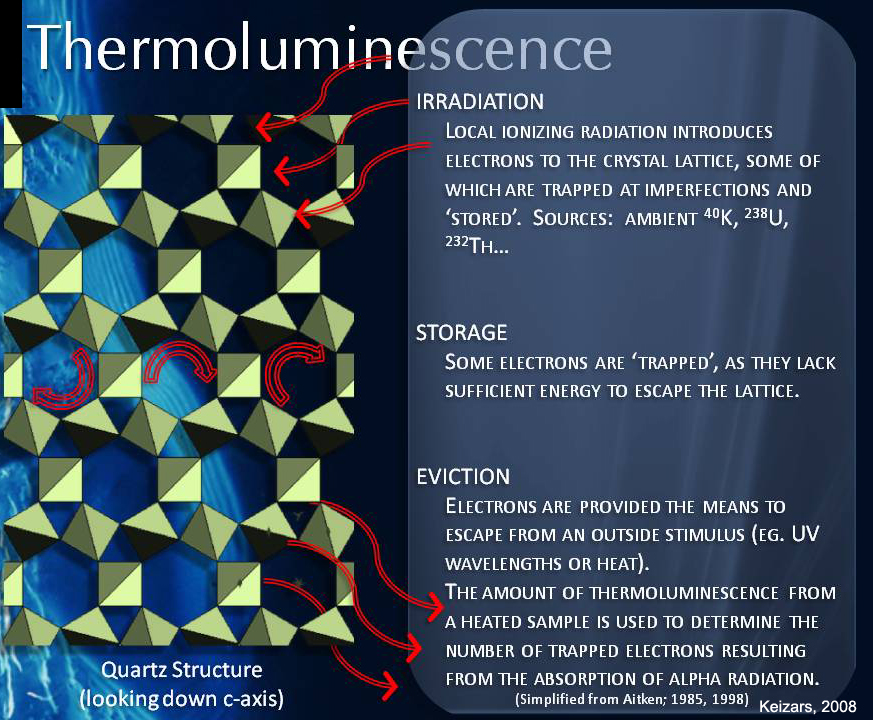
Figure 1: Three stages of thermoluminescence as outlined by Aitken, and applied to a quartz grain.

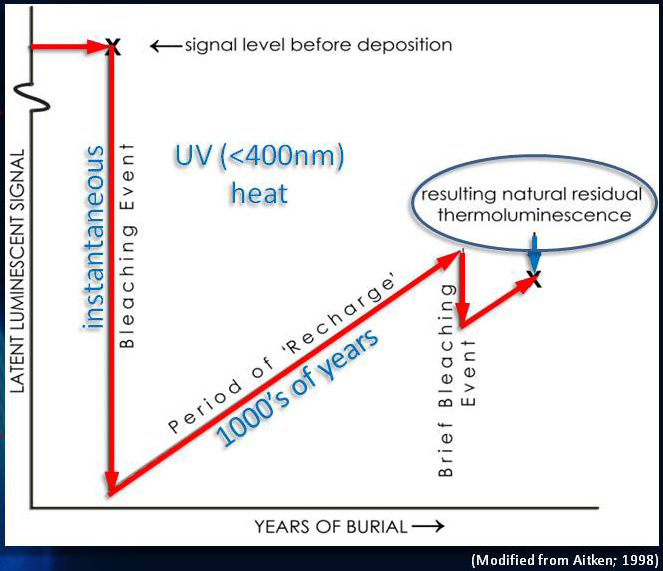
Figure 2: The process of recharging and discharging thermoluminescent signal, as applied to beach sands. (modified from Aitken).

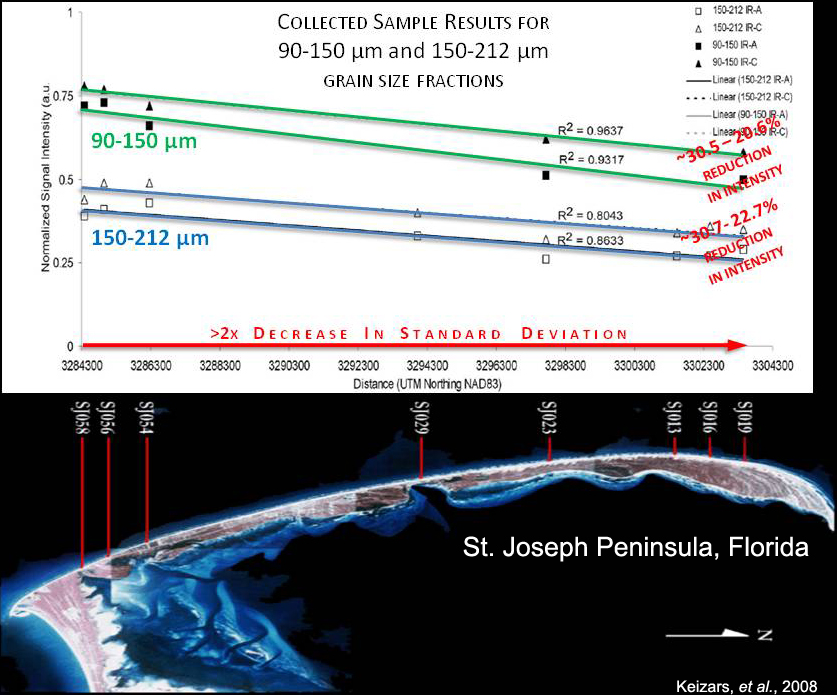
Figure 3: Thermoluminescence signature lost during migration of two sand grain sizes.

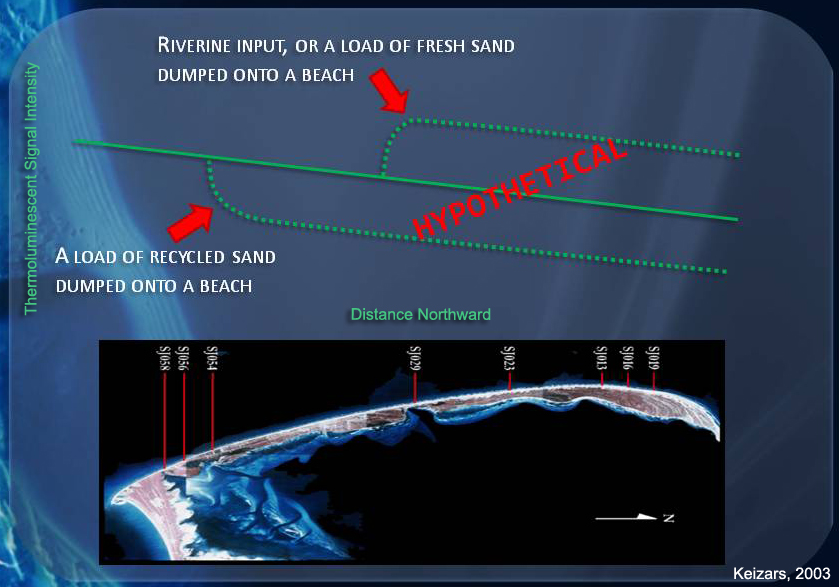
Figure 4: Illustrated method of passively monitoring sand input.

Thermoluminescence is a form of luminescence that is exhibited by certain crystalline materials, such as some minerals, when previously absorbed energy from electromagnetic radiation or other ionizing radiation is re-emitted as light upon heating of the material. The phenomenon is distinct from that of black-body radiation.

== Physics ==
High energy radiation creates electronic excited states in crystalline materials. In some materials, these states are trapped, or arrested, for extended periods of time by localized defects, or imperfections, in the lattice interrupting the normal intermolecular or inter-atomic interactions in the crystal lattice. Quantum-mechanically, these states are stationary states which have no formal time dependence; however, they are not stable energetically, as vacuum fluctuations are always "prodding" these states. Heating the material enables the trapped states to interact with phonons, i.e. lattice vibrations, to rapidly decay into lower-energy states, causing the emission of photons in the process.

== Use in dating ==
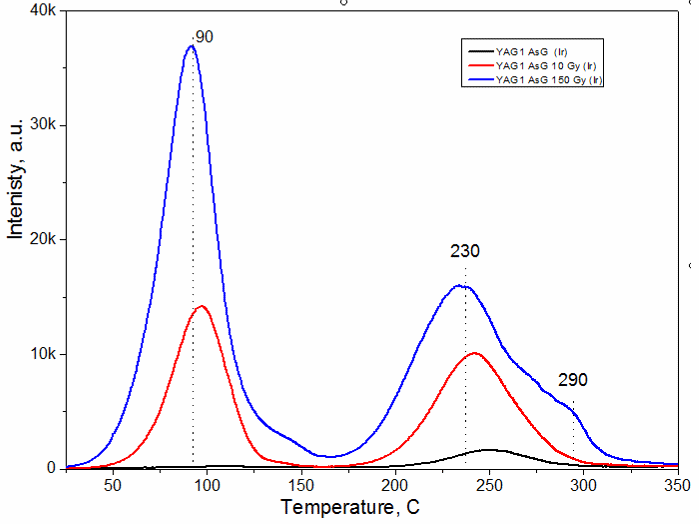
Graph of TSL (thermally stimulated luminescence)

The amount of luminescence is proportional to the original dose of radiation received. In thermoluminescence dating, this can be used to date buried objects that have been heated in the past, since the ionizing dose received from radioactive elements in the soil or from cosmic rays is proportional to age. This phenomenon has been applied in the thermoluminescent dosimeter, a device to measure the radiation dose received by a chip of suitable material that is carried by a person or placed with an object.

Thermoluminescence is a common geochronology tool for dating pottery or other fired archeological materials, as heat empties or resets the thermoluminescent signature of the material (Figure 1). Subsequent recharging of this material from ambient radiation can then be empirically dated by the equation:

Age = (subsequently accumulated dose of ambient radiation) / (dose accumulated per year)

This technique was modified for use as a passive sand migration analysis tool (Figure 2). The research shows direct consequences resulting from the improper replenishment of starving beaches using fine sands. Beach nourishment is a problem worldwide and receives large amounts of attention due to the millions of dollars spent yearly in order to keep beaches beautified for tourists, e.g. in Waikiki, Hawaii. Sands with sizes 90–150 μm (very fine sand) were found to migrate from the swash zone 67% faster than sand grains of 150–212 μm (fine sand; Figure 3). Furthermore, the technique was shown to provide a passive method of policing sand replenishment and a passive method of observing riverine or other sand inputs along shorelines (Figure 4).
