= 820s BC =

Decade

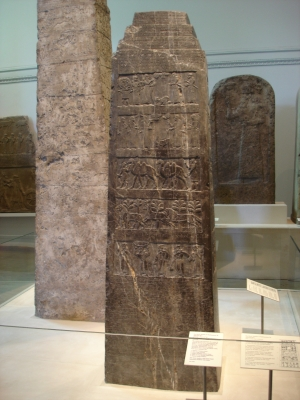
Black Obelisk of Shalmaneser III, erected in 825 BC.

This article concerns the period 829 BC – 820 BC.

== Events and trends ==
- 828 BC/827 BC (14th year in the era of Gònghé)—King Xuan of Zhou becomes king of the Zhou dynasty of China, ending the fourteen years of the Gonghe Regency.
- 828 BC—Xiong Yan is replaced by his son Xiong Shuang as Viscount of Chu.
- 825 BC—Takelot II, king of Egypt, dies. Crown Prince Osorkon III and Shoshenq III, sons of Takelot, battle for the throne.
- 825 BC/824 BC—Ariphron, King of Athens, dies after a reign of 20 years and is succeeded by his son Thespieus.
- 825 BC—Dido, founder of Carthage flees Tyre after the death of Acerbas
- 823 BC—Death of Shalmaneser III, king of Assyria. He is succeeded by his son Shamshi-Adad V.
- 821 BC—Xiong Xun, youngest brother of Xiong Shuang, ascends the throne of Chu after defeating his surviving brothers Xiong Xue and Xiong Kan.
- 820 BC—Pygmalion ascends the throne of Tyre.

== Significant people ==
- Amaziah, king of Judah, born (approximate date).
