= Xiong Yan =

Xiong Yan may refer to:

- Xiong Yan (elder) (died 848 BC), monarch of the state of Chu
- Xiong Yan (younger) (died 828 BC), his son, monarch of the state of Chu
- Xiong Yan (dissident) (born 1964), Chinese dissident
