= Zhou–Chu War =

War in China, 961 to 957 BC

Zhou–Chu war
Date	c. 961–957 BC (4 years)
Location	Hubei
Result	Chu victory
Territorial changes	Zhou dynasty conquers the region to the north of the Yangtze and east of the Han River. States and peoples south of the Yangtze and west of the Han River remain politically and culturally independent.

Belligerents
Zhou dynasty: State of Xin; State of Cai; State of E; State of Zeng; State of Deng; State of Fang; State of Guo	Chu confederation: 26 states of the Han River valley; Hufang Xian

Commanders and leaders
King Zhao of Zhou †; Minister Xin Yumi; Bo Maofu; Duke of Cai †; Baron of Guo; Baron of Nan; Scribe Yü; Hongshu	"Elder of Chu" (Note: "The elder of Chu" that is mentioned in contemporary bronze inscriptions as the Chu commander has been identified by some modern scholars as Xiong Ai.)

Strength
Six Armies of the West: c. 12.500 infantry; c. 500 chariots; Xin and Cai armies: c. 4000	Unknown

Casualties and losses
Extremely heavy; probably over 12.000	Unknown

The Zhou–Chu War was a military conflict between the Zhou dynasty under King Zhao and the state of Chu from 961 to 957 BC. King Zhao personally led at least two major campaigns against Chu and other states and tribes of the middle Yangtze region, initially conquering the lands north of the Yangtze and the Han River valley. Eventually, however, the Zhou forces suffered a crushing defeat, with half of their armed forces as well as King Zhao killed, subsequently losing control of much conquered territory. The war ended the era of Western Zhou's early expansion and forced it into the defense against foreign aggressors. On the other side, Chu consolidated its de facto independence and would continue to grow into one of the most powerful states of China.

== Background ==
=== The middle Yangtze area ===
Prominent archeological sites of 1500-1040 BC. Panlongcheng and Wucheng are to the south.

The war took place in the middle Yangtze region, which was dominated by marshes, swamps, and mountains, but still very fertile and extremely rich in ores like gold, copper and tin. As result of its natural wealth, the area not only spawned several highly developed Neolithic cultures, but also garnered the attention of the peoples living in the Central Plain. Subsequently, many northern cultures attempted to expand into the middle Yangtze region, aiming to exploit its mines. The most prominent and successful northern intruders belonged to the Erligang culture, commonly associated with the Shang dynasty. The Shang appear to have taken control of large swaths of the region around 1500 BC, even though they never controlled all eastern Hubei. With Panlongcheng as their local center, the northerners politically and culturally dominated the local populace, while they mined the middle Yangtze deposits in order to supply the bronze production of the Shang cities on the Central Plain. Among the most important mines were Tonglüshan and Tongling in Huangshi, both directly south of the Yangtze. According to later historiographies, the Shang also established several minor states in the region, among them E and Zeng.

After about a hundred years, the Shang hegemony appears to have faltered: Erligang-influenced sites began to sharply decline in the late 15th century BC and Panlongcheng was completely abandoned sometime after 1400 BC. Surviving Erligang centers such as Tonggushan near modern-day Yueyang mostly became localized and probably independent from the Shang dynasty. Even though Shang rule over eastern Hubei had mostly collapsed by the 14th century BC, the dynasty continued to be active in the middle Yangtze area. Oracle bone inscriptions report both the continued existence of a few Shang-loyal enclaves in Hubei, such as E, Zeng, and Chü, as well as many military campaigns against southern peoples. These campaigns probably were only of limited success and little effect, however, so that the Shang dynasty never again regained their dominance over the south. Nevertheless, the Shang dynasty's continued presence in the south, even if it was weak, would later on become crucial for the Zhou dynasty's southern expansion.

The end of the Shang hegemony probably left a political vacuum in the middle Yangtze region behind. Archaeological findings show no cultural unity in the region after the Erligang period, making the existence of a larger, centralized power unlikely. In place of northern influence, the powerful Wucheng culture began to expand from Jiangxi into the middle Yangtze area, though the Wucheng people probably never politically dominated the region as the Shang dynasty had. Nevertheless, the end of central authority did not led to a cultural or technological breakdown in the area. Instead, the end of Shang rule allowed several small but highly developed native centers to emerge, which possibly led to "a flowering of civilization at this stage". Largely freed from foreign dominance, these polities became economically, technologically, and politically highly advanced, while also growing in military strength. Against the late Shang dynasty, the Yangtze peoples showed great resilience and martial strength.

Three of these Yangtze polities would become involved in the war of 961–957 BC: Chu or "Jing-Chu", Hufang, and Xian. Where these polities were exactly located or which form they took, however, cannot be derived from archaeological material and contemporary records. Therefore, all following information on these polities is a matter of debate and based on certain interpretations.

- Arguably the most important, and possibly the most powerful, of this group was Chu. While its later rulers claimed to have descended from the legendary Xia dynasty, Chu was probably an amalgamation of indigenous tribal confederations with strong northern ties that emerged after the end of local Shang rule. The Chu had originally settled along the Dan River in southern Henan, but at some point, likely before the war of King Zhao, they relocated to the mountainous area west of the Han River in eastern Hubei. There, they constructed a fortified center near the Jing Mountains. In the time, Chu became the dominant local power, taking control of several vassal tribes and statelets. As result their growing power, the early Chu rulers even "received some form of Shang recognition".
- The much more obscure Hufang share their name with a polity recorded on Shang dynasty oracle bones. These earlier Hufang are commonly associated with the aforementioned Wucheng culture. It is strongly debated whether the earlier Hufang are identical with the later Hufang that fought against King Zhao of Zhou, though the Wucheng culture's collapse coincides with the war against the King Zhao, and Donald B. Wagner directly links the end of Wucheng to the rise of the Zhou dynasty. Regardless of their actual identity, the later Hufang are generally located at the Han River or the Yangtze by sinologists. (Note: A notable exception is Ding Shan, who associated the Hufang with the Nanman state of Yihu in the Spring and Autumn period and placed them in Anhui.) Li Feng believes that the Hufang were quite powerful, and that they, not Chu, were the primary enemies of King Zhao.
- If the Xian that was involved in the war of 961-957 BC can be associated with the Spring and Autumn period state of the same name, it was located in the modern-day Huangzhou District. Little more is known of it.

=== Relationship between the Zhou dynasty and the south until 977 BC ===
The activity of the Shang dynasty in the middle Yangtze area came to a sudden end with the dynasty's destruction by the Zhou people in c. 1046 BC, who in turn established their own dynasty on the Central Plains. To the people of the Yangtze, however, the Zhou were not unknown. Indeed, the Records of the Grand Historian record that before the conquest of Shang, the ruler of Chu, Yuxiong, had traveled all the way to the Zhou court at Feng in Shaanxi to submit to King Wen of Zhou. Perhaps, speculates Ralph D. Sawyer, Yu Xiong had recognized that the Shang dynasty was crumbling or he simply wanted to ensure good relations with all powerful neighbors. Either way, he recognized the Zhou as promising upstarts and established a friendly relationship with them. Consequently, when the Zhou overthrew the Shang dynasty, Chu supported the former by supplying bows and arrows.

Nevertheless, the submission of Chu to the early Zhou kingdom was "hardly even nominal" – too great were the distances between the two polities, and too great was the independence of the Chu people. That the formal submission served as little more than modest alliance or non-aggression pact, however, was not an issue for the early Zhou rulers. For them, it was already beneficial if there were no threats from the south, while they were consolidating their new realm. The mutually beneficial, peaceful and cooperative relationship between Chu and Zhou continued under King Cheng of Zhou, who enfeoffed the Chu ruler Xiong Yi as viscount. Under King Kang, Xiong Yi even became one of the five most important ministers at the Zhou court.

Besides these purported political ties to the Chu, the Zhou dynasty also gained a foothold in the Yangtze area. As the official successor of the Shang, the Zhou dynasty became the new overlord of the remaining southern Shang vassals, most importantly E and Zeng. The dynasty also inherited the old trade routes to the great southern mines, which quickly became economically significant for the Zhou. Just as the Shang people before them, the new dynasty began to heavily rely on imported ores from the southern mines to sustain their own growing large-scale bronze production. Nevertheless, cultural Zhou influence in the middle Yangtze area was initially weak. Very few Zhou bronzes of the Shang-Zhou transition period were found in eastern Hubei, indicating little Zhou presence in the region. These findings correspond with contemporary bronze inscriptions, which show that the dynasty was initially focused on expanding to the east and north, while leaving the southern polities mostly alone.

== Prelude ==
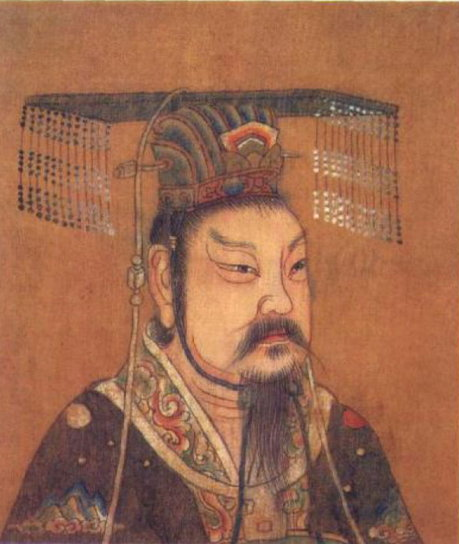
In the tradition of his predecessors, King Zhao of Zhou desired to expand the Zhou kingdom through conquest.

The situation began to change dramatically during King Zhao of Zhou's reign (r. 977-957 BC). After his predecessors had mostly secured the Zhou empire's eastern, northern and western borders, King Zhao turned his attention to the south and began a major military and colonial venture directed at the middle Yangtze area. In the beginning, the Zhou significantly strengthened their presence in the Suizhou area. In doing so, the local vassal states of Zeng and E were significantly expanded and became crucial bases for the southern expansion. Especially Zeng transformed into a rich and powerful marquisate (hóu 侯) during this period.

The exact cause for King Zhao's aggressive expansion into the south is unknown, but sinologists have contemplated several possibilities. On one side, the expansion could have had economic causes, as the need for ores was constantly growing in the Zhou empire. In consequence, King Zhao might have wanted to fully secure and exploit the Yangtze mines by conquering them. Since the southern polities were relatively wealthy, the Zhou expansion might also have been motivated by the hope for plunder. Furthermore, ideology might have contributed to the war's outbreak: Perhaps King Zhao desired to recover the southern territories of the fallen Shang dynasty, since the Zhou dynasty saw itself as the latter's legitimate successor and thus entitled to rule all of its former territory.

On the other side, political differences could have served as main reasons for the outbreak of hostilities. Sawyer argues that, as the "awesomeness of the Shang conquest" began to fade, many non-Zhou vassal states grew restive. As most of them were probably only formally submissive to the Zhou dynasty and did little more than sending tributes, it would have meant no great effort for them to cast off their allegiance to the distant dynasty. Based upon later historiographies, Charles Higham believes that this had been the case for Chu: It had rapidly expanded after the Shang-Zhou transition, growing in power and influence and uniting large swaths of the Han River and the middle Yangtze valleys under its control. With its power on the rise, Chu became defiant towards the Zhou rulers. Feeling threatened or simply offended by Chu's ascension and defiance, King Zhao might have decided to invade the Yangtze region and later Chu itself in order to reestablish absolute Zhou dominance. This interpretation is supported by the fact that bronze inscriptions and later historiographies accuse both Chu as well as the Hufang of rebellion against the Zhou dynasty. Sawyer notes, however, that even if Chu and other natives appeared as threat to King Zhao, the Zhou acted as primary aggressors through several invasions into the Yangtze area.

== War ==
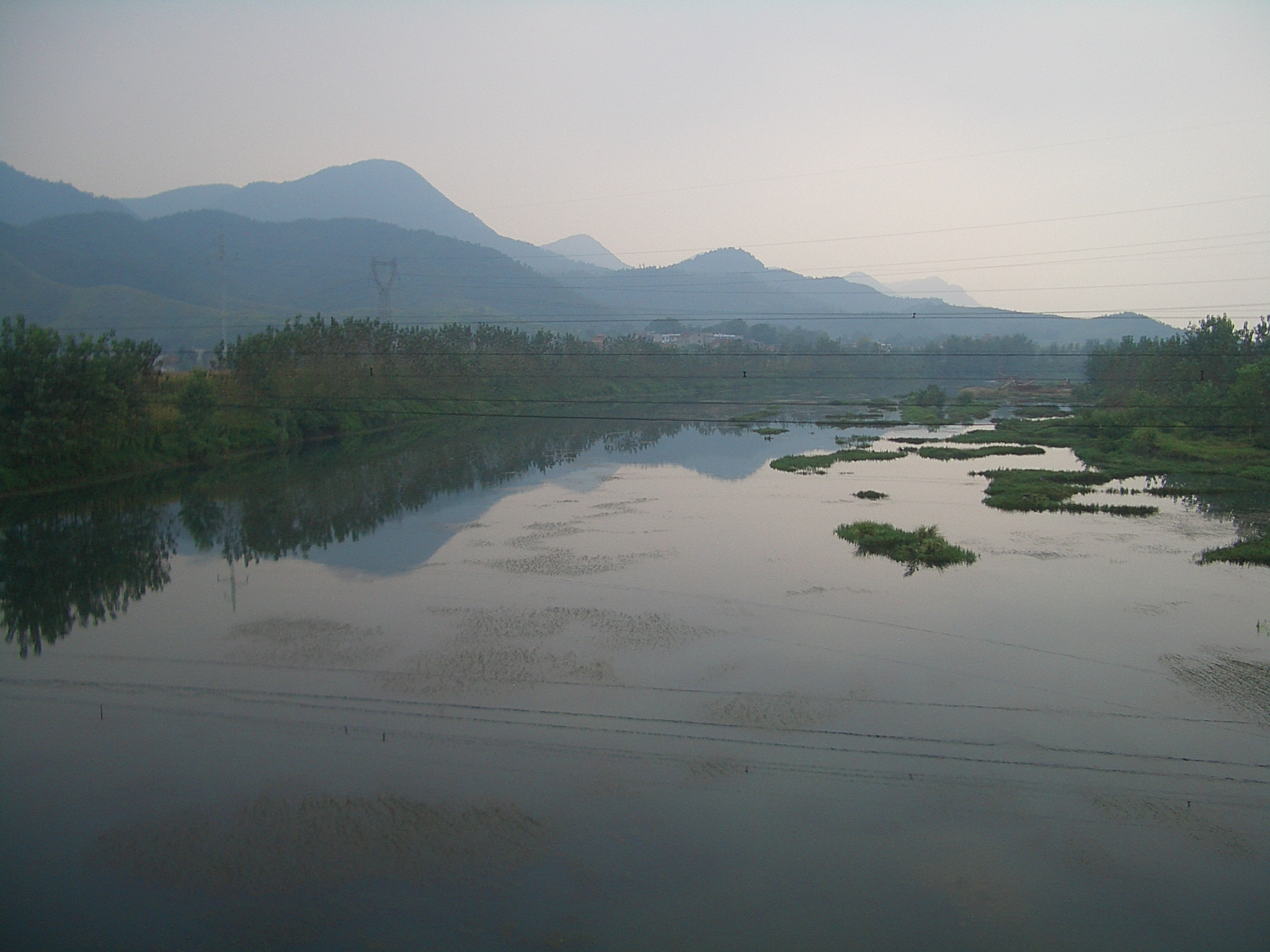
At the time of King Zhao's invasion, marshes such as these in Yangxin were common along both the Han River as well as the Yangtze.

The war began around 961 BC, in the sixteenth year of King Zhao's reign, when either one of the Chu vassal states attacked Zhou territory or Zhao launched a preemptive strike. As hostilities broke out, the Zhou official Bo Maofu was ordered to patrol the Han River, to prevent any enemy groups from flanking the Zhou defenses or bypass them completely to invade the vulnerable western holdings of the Zhou, while the southern Zhou vassal states of Zeng, E, Fang, and Deng were inspected and enlisted for the war effort. When the Zhou royal forces arrived from Chengzhou in the middle Yangtze region, they set up their camp at Zeng. From there, the combined troops of the royal armies and the vassal states conquered the area north of the Yangtze, and then crossed the Han River, where King Zhao encountered a rhinoceros, which was interpreted as an auspicious sign. The Zhou army proceeded to subdue the 26 Chu vassal states of the Han River valley, and then attacked and captured the fortified Chu capital near the Jing Mountains. In doing so, the Zhou captured much loot, especially precious metals, supporting the theory that one major reason for Zhou's southern expansion was the quest for ores or plunder. The king was unable to or chose not to destroy or occupy Chu, however, so that Chu was able to rebuild its strength. Nevertheless, the Zhou forces managed to take full control of the area east of the Han River and north of the Yangtze. There, they constructed the stronghold of Lutaishan as political and military base.

After these first successes, the Zhou forces launched attacks on other southern polities in order to secure the whole region: An army under Scribe Yü successfully campaigned against Xian, while the Duke of Nan led an assault against the Hufang around 959 BC, and probably was victorious, though this is disputed. These campaigns were well prepared and planned through the construction of forward bases, the use of local allies, such as the states of Fang, Deng and Eh, and diplomatic ventures. The ruler of Qin, for example, was sent to the people of Fan in northern Henan in order to secure their cooperation during the campaigns against Chu.

In 957 BC, King Zhao launched his second major military campaign beyond the Han River. As he employed half of Zhou's royal forces, organized into the "Six Armies of the West", Li Feng and Ralph D. Sawyer believe that this massive assault indicated Zhao's desire to permanently bring the middle Yangzi region under his control by completely destroying Chu. If the Bamboo Annals are to be believed, the second offensive against Chu started under the bad omen of a comet sighting, and consequently the massive Zhou army, personally led by King Zhao, the Duke of Cai, and Minister Xin Yumi, proved unable to defeat Chu. Yin Hongbing assumes that the unfamiliarity of the Zhou with the geographical and climatic features of the south led to their defeat in this campaign. Driven back, the Zhou wanted to retreat across the Han River, but according to the Lüshi chunqiu the bridge they used collapsed, casting both the king and the Duke of Cai into the waves. Even though Xin Yumi, who had successfully crossed the river, attempted to save them, they drowned. In recognition of his efforts to rescue King Zhao, Xin Yumi was later made baron. The reason for the bridge's failure is unknown, but it could have resulted from overload, sabotage or a surprise attack by Chu. With the collapse of the bridge, reasons Ralph D. Sawyer, the Zhou army had not only lost their most important commanders, but, more importantly, their only route of retreat. This would have thrown the cut off Zhou troops into chaos, whereupon they were overwhelmed and destroyed by the Chu forces, likely in "a major engagement". King Zhao's death and defeat were consequently attributed to the Chu by later generations.

== Aftermath ==
After its victory over Zhou and the conquest of E, Chu grew into one of the most powerful states of the Spring and Autumn and Warring States periods.

King Zhao's disastrous defeat had serious political repercussions for the Zhou dynasty. The destruction of nearly half of the royal forces, possibly over 12.000 soldiers, was an overwhelming military setback. It stopped the Zhou kingdom's expansion and forced it into the defense, as the Zhou attempted to rebuild their strength. There were no more serious invasions of the southern polities, and the Zhou were therefore never again able to venture farther south into the middle Yangtze region. Military campaigns against the Dongyi of Shandong stagnated and then ceased altogether. However, despite his "humiliating end", King Zhao was still sometimes commemorated for his southern campaigns, as he had at least established political dominance over the region to the north of the Yangtze and east of the Han River. The Zhou were also able to rebuild the lost Six Armies of the West during the reign of Zhao's successor, King Mu, and successfully defended the kingdom against ensuing foreign invasions.

That these invasions even occurred, however, is a sign for the decline of the Western Zhou. Much more serious than its military losses was the far-reaching psychological impact of the Zhou defeat. For the Zhou people there could have hardly been a worse omen than the inauspicious death of the Son of Heaven at the hands of the southern barbarians. The Zhou kingdom was no longer invincible, and from then on its enemies "would not hesitate to test its strength whenever possible." The Zhou state "never really recovered from this loss". Under the following kings, revolts of vassal states and foreign invasions of Zhou lands became ever more frequent.

Meanwhile, the Chu confederation nominally submitted once again to the Zhou kings after its victory, with its rulers refraining from using royal titles. As Chu had firmly established its autonomy and control over the middle Yangtze region, there was no longer any need to openly defy the Zhou monarchs. Following his father's death, King Mu led a punitive campaign against the confederation to force it back into full submission, but was unsuccessful. Chu remained unchallenged and virtually independent. Possibly to check the confederation's expansion, the Zhou dynasty moved its vassal state of E into the Nanyang Basin, north of Chu. Until the rule of King Li of Zhou, E was possibly the most powerful state of the middle Yangtze region, and ensured Zhou's security in the south. E revolted in 850 BC, however, and was destroyed by Zhou, allowing it to be absorbed by Chu which consequently grew even more powerful. After one last war with Zhou in 823 BC, the state of Chu fully seceded from the Zhou kingdom. After 703 BC, the Chu rulers finally declared themselves kings and equals to the Zhou rulers.

== Bibliography ==
- 禹鼎：西周灭鄂国的见证 [Yu Ding: Evidence of the Extermination of the State of E during the Western Zhou Dynasty] (in Chinese).
- Bagley, Robert (1999). "Western Zhou History". In Loewe, Michael; Shaughnessy, Edward L. (eds.). Shang Archaeology. Cambridge, New York City, Melbourne, et al.: Cambridge University Press. pp. 124–231. ISBN 0-521-47030-7.
- Blakeley, Barry B. (1999). "The Geography of Chu". In Cook, Constance A.; Major, John S. (eds.). Defining Chu: Image And Reality In Ancient China. Honolulu: University of Hawaii Press. pp. 9–20. ISBN 0-8248-2905-0.
- Campbell, Roderick B. Campbell (2014). Archaeology of the Chinese Bronze Age: From Erlitou to Anyang. Los Angeles: Cotsen Inst of Archaeology Press. ISBN 978-193174598-7.
- Dreyer, Edward L. (2012). "Continuity and Change". In Graff, David Andrew; Higham, Robin (eds.). A Military History of China. Lexington, Kentucky: University Press of Kentucky. pp. 19–38. ISBN 978-081313584-7.
- von Falkenhausen, Lothar (1999). "The Waning of the Bronze Age Material Culture and Social Developments, 770–481 B.C". In Loewe, Michael; Shaughnessy, Edward L. (eds.). The Cambridge History of ancient China – From the Origins of Civilization to 221 B.C. Cambridge, New York City, Melbourne, et al.: Cambridge University Press. pp. 450–544. ISBN 0-521-47030-7.
- Flad, Rowan K.; Chen, Pochan (2013). Ancient Central China: Centers and Peripheries along the Yangzi River. Cambridge, New York City, Melbourne, et al.: Cambridge University Press. ISBN 978-0-521-72766-2.
- Frühauf, Manfred W. (2008). "Chinas ältester Reisebericht: Das Mu Tianzi Zhuan 穆天子傳". In Leutner, Mechthild; Mühlhahn, Klaus; Goikhman, Izabella (eds.). Reisen in chinesischer Geschichte und Gegenwart: Erfahrungen, Berichte, Zeugnisse (in German). Wiesbaden: Harrassowitz Verlag. pp. 7–26. ISBN 978-3-447-05646-5.
- Higham, Charles (2004). Encyclopedia of Ancient Asian Civilizations. New York City: Infobase Publishing. ISBN 0-8160-4640-9.
- Hubei Provincial Institute of Cultural Relics and Archaeology and Suizhou Museum (2013). "The Yejiashan Cemetery of the Western Zhou Dynasty in Suizhou City, Hubei". Chinese Archaeology. 13 (1). Berlin, Boston: Walter de Gruyter: 1–10. doi:10.1515/char-2013-0001. S2CID 199666016.
- Li, Feng (2006). Menges, Axel (ed.). Landscape and Power in Early China: The Crisis and Fall of the Western Zhou 1045–771 BC. Cambridge, New York City, Melbourne, et al.: Cambridge University Press. ISBN 0-521-85272-2.
- Li, Feng (2013). Early China: A Social and Cultural History. Cambridge: Cambridge University Press. ISBN 978-0-521-71981-0.
- "New achievements from the excavation at the Yejiashan West Zhou graveyard, Suizhou, Hubei". Chinese Archaeology 05/17/2016. Archived from the original on 7 August 2016.
- Peers, Chris (2013). Battles of Ancient China. Barnsley: Pen and Sword Books. ISBN 978-1-84884-790-3.
- Sawyer, Ralph D. (2011). Ancient Chinese Warfare. New York City: Basic Books. ISBN 978-046502145-1 – via Internet Archive.
- Sawyer, Ralph D. (2013). Conquest and Domination in early China. Rise and Demise of the Western Chou. CreateSpace Independent Publishing Platform. ISBN 978-148491248-5.
- Shaughnessy, Edward L. (1991). Sources of Western Zhou History: Inscribed Bronze Vessels. Berkeley, Los Angeles, Oxford: University of California Press. ISBN 0-520-07028-3 – via Internet Archive.
- Shaughnessy, Edward L. (1999). "Western Zhou History". In Loewe, Michael; Shaughnessy, Edward L. (eds.). The Cambridge History of ancient China – From the Origins of Civilization to 221 B.C. Cambridge, New York City, Melbourne, et al.: Cambridge University Press. pp. 292–351. ISBN 0-521-47030-7.
- Shaughnessy, Edward L. (2006). Rewriting Early Chinese Texts. New York City: State University of New York Press. ISBN 978-0-7914-6644-5.
- Wagner, Donald B. (1993). Iron and Steel in Ancient China. Leiden, New York City, Cologne: Brill Publishers. ISBN 978-900409632-5.
- Whiting, Marvin C. (2002). Imperial Chinese Military History: 8000 BC-1912 AD. Lincoln: iUniverse. ISBN 0-595-22134-3.
- Yin Hongbing (2015). "A Geographical and Archaeological Perspective on the Southern Expedition of King Zhao of Zhou". Historical Studies (Chinese Edition) (1). Archived from the original on 2016-06-23.
- Ziju (子居). 清华简《楚居》解析 [Analysis of the Tsinghua Bamboo Slips]. jianbo.org (in Chinese). Archived from the original on 2 December 2013.
- Zuo Qiuming. "Duke Xi - V. Fifth year". Zuo Zhuan (in Chinese and English).
