= Xiong Yi =

Xiong Yi is the personal name of:

- Xiong Yi (11th century BC), ruler of Chu
- Ruo'ao (died 764 BC), ruler of Chu
- King Dao of Chu (died 381 BC), ruler of Chu
