= Xiong Da =

Xiong Da is the Pinyin romanization of the names of two leaders of the State of Chu:

- Xiong Da (熊䵣), reigned c. 941 BC
- King Wu of Chu (熊達), reigned 740–690 BC
