= Yang Xiong =

Yang Xiong may refer to:

- Yang Xiong (author) (揚雄; 53 BCE – 18 CE), Chinese Taoist, poet, and author during the Han dynasty
- Yang Xiong (politician) (杨雄; 1953–2021), mayor of Shanghai
- Yang Xiong (Water Margin) (楊雄), fictional character in the 14th-century novel Water Margin

== See also ==
- Xiong Yang
