= Xiong Ai =

Xiong Ai 熊艾

Viscount of Chu
- Reign: c. 977 BC
- Predecessor: Xiong Yi
- Successor: Xiong Dan
- Issue: Xiong Dan
Names
- Ancestral name: Mǐ (羋); Lineage name: Xióng (熊); Given name: Ài (艾)
- House: Mi
- Dynasty: Chu
- Father: Xiong Yi

Xiong Ai (Chinese: 熊艾) was a monarch of the Chu state. He succeeded his father, Xiong Yi, who was the first Chu ruler enfeoffed by King Cheng of Zhou and granted the hereditary noble rank of viscount.

Ancient Chinese texts recorded that King Zhao of Zhou led an expedition against Chu, but the Zhou dynasty was defeated and King Zhao of Zhou himself drowned in the Han River in 977 BC. It is generally believed that Xiong Ai was the monarch of Chu at the time.

Xiong Ai was succeeded by his son, Xiong Dan.

Xiong Ai House of Mi
Regnal titles
Preceded by Xiong Yi	Viscount of Chu c. 977 BCE	Succeeded by Xiong Dan
