= Xian (state) =

Xian 弦
- Unknown–655 BC
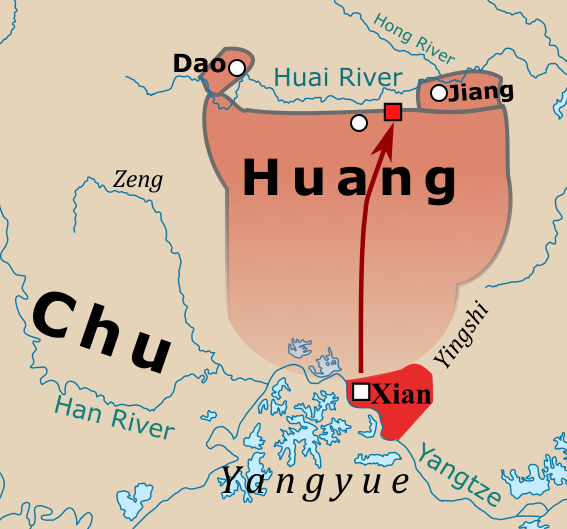
- The state of Xian (red) and its allies (pink). Escape of Xian's viscount (red arrow) and the capital-in-exile (red square). Shown borders are approximate.
- Capital: Xian (modern-day Qishui, Huangzhou District)
- Capital-in-exile: Unknown (near modern-day Xi County, Henan)
- Government: Monarchy
- Historical era: Western Zhou period Spring and Autumn period
  - Established: Unknown
  - Zhou–Chu War: c. 961–957 BC
  - Conquered by Chu: 655 BC
Succeeded by
Chu (state)
- Today part of: China

Xian (Chinese: 弦; pinyin: Xián) was a minor state of the Western Zhou and Spring and Autumn periods, whose capital was located at modern-day Qishui, Huangzhou District. While it controlled only a small territory along the Yangtze, the Wei clan (隗) that ruled Xian maintained far-reaching diplomatic and marital relations with many neighboring states.

== History ==
During the reign of King Zhao of Zhou, the Zhou dynasty launched a successful campaign against Xian. This campaign was probably part of the wider Zhou–Chu War (c. 961–957 BC). Despite its defeat, however, Xian survived.

In the early Spring and Autumn period, the state of Chu grew in power and began to expand its influence over eastern Hubei. In doing so, it was mostly content with expressions of loyalty from its neighbors, instead of immediately conquering them. The viscount of Xian, however, remained defiant. Despite Chu's power, he felt secure because of his marital ties with the states of Jiang, Huang, Dao, and Bo, which in turn were allies of the hegemon of China, Duke Huan of Qi. Confident that they would aid him if Chu attacked, the viscount made no emergency preparations. This overconfidence led to Xian's ruin according to the Zuo Zhuan, as no one came to help the state when it was actually invaded by a Chu army under Dou Gouwutu in 655 BC. Xian was annexed by Chu, but the viscount managed to escape to Huang. Eventually, he and his followers settled down near modern-day Xi County, Henan, on the border to the Chu-occupied territory of Xi. Chu eventually conquered the area where Xian's new capital-in-exile was located between 648 and 623 BC.

== Bibliography ==
- Sawyer, Ralph D. (2013). Conquest and Domination in early China. Rise and Demise of the Western Chou. CreateSpace Independent Publishing Platform. ISBN 978-1484912485.
- Blakeley, Barry B. (1999). "The Geography of Chu". In Constance A. Cook; John S. Major (eds.). Defining Chu: Image And Reality In Ancient China. Honolulu: University of Hawaii Press. pp. 9–20. ISBN 0-8248-2905-0.
- Herrmann, Albert (1966). An historical atlas of China. Edinburgh: Edinburgh University Press.
