= Xiong Kang =

Xiong Kang 熊康

Viscount of Chu
- Reign: ?–?
- Predecessor: Xiong Qu
- Successor: Xiong Zhi
Names
- Ancestral name: Mǐ (羋); Lineage name: Xióng (熊); Given name: Kāng (康) or Wúkāng (毋康) or Ài (艾)
- House: Mi
- Dynasty: Chu
- Father: Xiong Qu

Xiong Kang (Chinese: 熊康), also called Xiong Wukang (Chinese: 熊毋康), was a ruler of the Chu state.

Xiong Kang succeeded his father, Xiong Qu. The Records of the Grand Historian states that Xiong Kang died early and Xiong Qu was succeeded by Xiong Zhi. However, the Xinian account in the Tsinghua Bamboo Slips records that Xiong Kang was the successor of Xiong Qu.

Xiong Kang House of Mi
Regnal titles
Preceded by Xiong Qu	Viscount of Chu	Succeeded by Xiong Zhi
