= Xiong Yong =

Xiong Yong 熊勇

Viscount of Chu
- Reign: 847–838 BC
- Predecessor: Xiong Yan (熊延)
- Successor: Xiong Yan (熊嚴)
- Died: 838 BC
Names
- Ancestral name: Mǐ (羋); Lineage name: Xióng (熊); Given name: Yǒng (勇 or 甬)
- House: Mi
- Dynasty: Chu
- Father: Xiong Yan

Xiong Yong (Chinese: 熊勇) was from 847 BC to 838 BC the viscount of the Chu state.

Xiong Yong succeeded his father, Xiong Yan (熊延). He died after 10 years of reign and was succeeded by his younger brother, Xiong Yan (熊嚴).

Xiong Yong House of Mi
Regnal titles
Preceded by Xiong Yan (elder)	Viscount of Chu; 847–838 BC	Succeeded by Xiong Yan (younger)
