= Xiao'ao =

Xiong Kan
- Ruler of Chu
- Reign: 763–758 bce
Full name
- Clan name: 姓 Ancestral temple surname: Mǐ (羋); 氏 Lineage surname: Xióng (熊); Given name: Kǎn (坎)
Posthumous name
- Xiāo’áo

Xiāo’áo (Chinese: 霄敖, died 758 bce) was from 763 to 758 bce the monarch of the state of Chu during the early Spring and Autumn period of ancient China. He was born Xiong Kan (熊坎) and Xiao'ao was his posthumous title.

Like other early Chu rulers, Xiao'ao held the hereditary noble rank of viscount that was first granted to his ancestor Xiong Yi by King Cheng of Zhou.

Xiao'ao succeeded his father Ruo'ao, who died in 764 bce. After a six-year reign he was succeeded by his son Fenmao.

Xiao’ao House of Mi Died: 758 bce
Regnal titles
Preceded by Ruo'ao	Viscount of Chu; 763–758 bce	Succeeded by Fenmao
