= Xi'e =

Region of ancient China

Xi'e (Chinese: 西鄂, p Xī'è) was a region of ancient China in present-day Henan and Hubei. Under the Qin and Han dynasties and during the Three Kingdoms period, Xi'e County (t 西鄂縣, s 西鄂县, Xī'èxiàn) was also a county in the Nanyang Commandery.

== Name ==
Xi'e (lit. "Western E") took its name from the E, a Shang-dynasty vassal state probably originally located in modern Shanxi. The name is now pronounced as a brief, hard schwa (IPA: [ə]), but the ancient pronunciation of the name has been reconstructed as closer to *Ngˤak. Around the time of the Qin, therefore, "Xi'e" would have been pronounced something like *Snˤər Ngˤak. By the Jin, it would have been Middle Chinese Ser Ngak.

== History ==
During the Zhou, E was forced to relocate at least twice under pressure from Jin and Chu. Absorbed by Chu in 863 BC, E was adopted as the state's capital by a number of Chu kings prior to their final conquest by Shi Huangdi in 223 BC. Ezhou then became a province under the Qin and Han.

Thereafter, Xi'e was a county in the Nanyang Commandery during the Qin and Han dynasties and the Three Kingdoms period.

== Famous residents ==
It was the birthplace of Zhang Heng (AD 78–139), a famous Chinese polymath of the Han dynasty. Du Xi served as its chief (西鄂縣長) around the end of the 2nd century. Luo Xian (died 270) was proclaimed Marquis of Xi'e (西鄂縣侯) late in life as part of the creation of the Jin at the end of the Three Kingdoms period.
