= Wang Jiang =

Wang Jiang, may refer to:

- Wang Jiang (Queen consort) (王姜), Queen consort of King Kang of Zhou.
- Wang Jiang (banker) (王江), Chinese banker and the current party secretary of China Everbright Group, president of the Bank of China and China Construction Bank.
