= King Kang of Zhou =

Third king of the Zhou dynasty

King Kang of Zhou 周康王
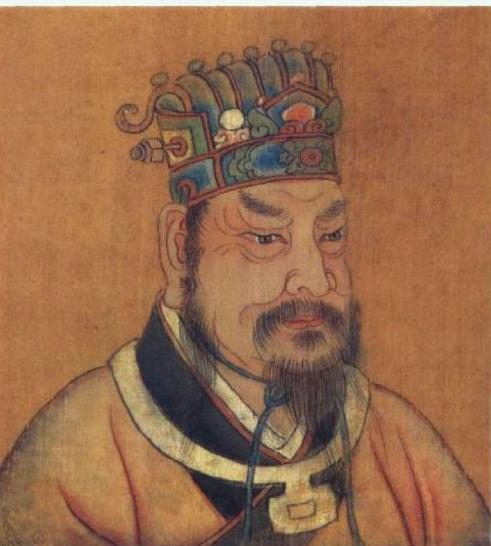
- Posthumous depiction from the Qing dynasty

King of the Zhou dynasty
- Reign: 1020/05–996/78 BC
- Predecessor: King Cheng of Zhou
- Successor: King Zhao of Zhou
- Born: Ji Zhao (姬釗)
- Died: 996/78 BC
- Spouse: Wang Jiang
- Issue: King Zhao of Zhou
Names
- Ancestral name: Jī (姬); Given name: Zhāo (釗)
Posthumous name
- King Kang (康王)
- House: Ji
- Dynasty: Zhou (Western Zhou)
- Father: King Cheng of Zhou
- Mother: Wang Si

King Kang of Zhou

Posthumous name
- Chinese: 周康王
- Literal meaning: The Joyful King of Zhou
Transcriptions
Standard Mandarin
- Hanyu Pinyin: Zhōu Kang Wáng
- Wade–Giles: Chou Kang-wang; King Kang of Chou

King Kang of Zhou (Chinese: 周康王; died 996/78 BC), personal name Ji Zhao, was the third king of the Chinese Zhou dynasty.

He was a son of his predecessor, King Cheng. He was succeeded by his son, King Zhao, and was seen as a positive ruler, under whom Western Zhou prospered.

== Reign ==
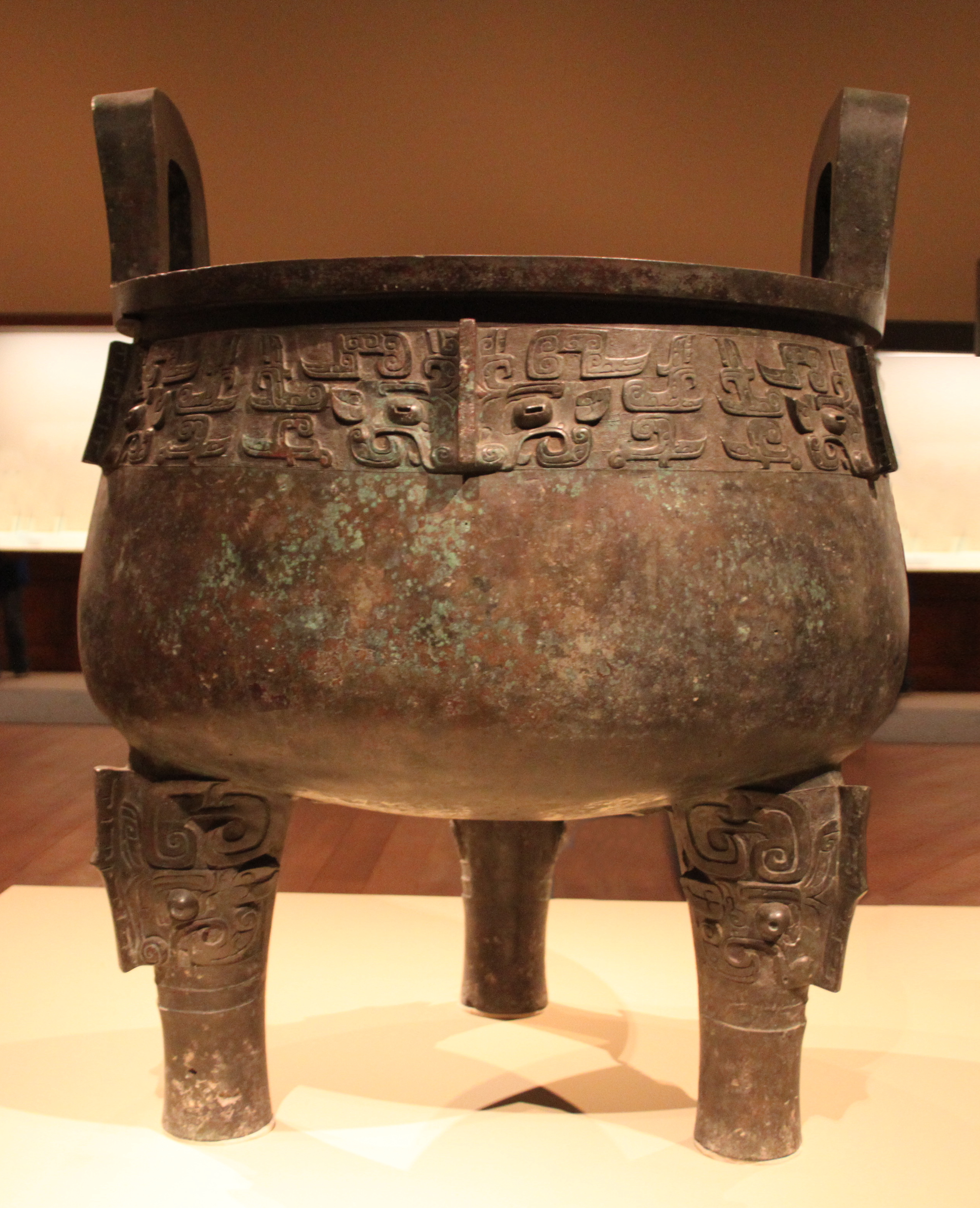
The Da Yu ding, which features a speech by King Kang in its inscription.

King Kang followed his father's policy and expanded the Zhou territory in the north and west. It appears that his queen, Wang Jiang, played a larger role in the management of the royal coffers, assisting in military campaigns, and rewarding officials by his request.

Sima Qian records that King Cheng of Zhou was nearing the end of his life, he feared that King Kang would be unfit to rule Zhou. He therefore ordered the Duke of Shao and the Duke of Bi to teach him the basic principles and assist in his enthronement. This was recorded in The Dying Emperor's Will (顧命) in the Book of Documents, which remains extant. Within the text, King Cheng orders the two to ensure that the coming King Kang does not rashly run into what is not right, and predicted great difficulty ahead for Zhou. King Cheng died the next day. After a period of mourning, the new King Kang was given a jade tablet, reading:

皇后憑玉几，道揚末命：命汝嗣訓，臨君周邦，率循大卞，燮和天下，用答揚文武之光訓。
This Sovereign, leaning upon that jade armrest, utters his final order: ‘I command you to carry on the instruction, to preside over Zhou, to follow the great statutes, to harmonise and pacify all under heaven, and so to answer and exalt the glorious teachings of King Wen and King Wu.

King Kang, upon receiving this, bowed twice, but was uncertain as to whether he would be able to rule with the same proficiency as his predecessor.

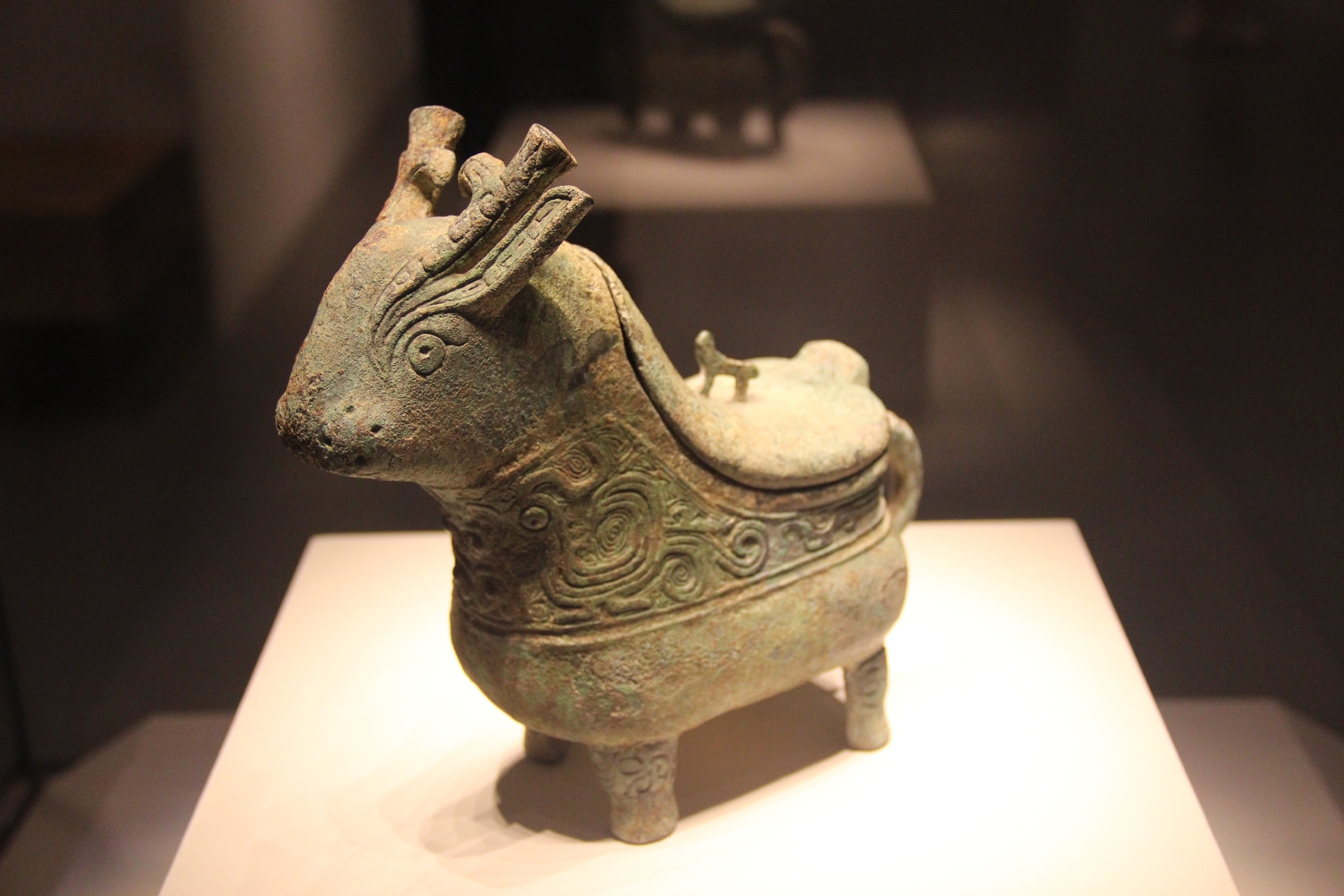
Bronze gong from King Kang's reign.

During his crowning ceremony, King Kang made the Announcement of Kang, also extant in the Book of Documents. In it, he emphasises the need to look back on the policies of the better rulers of the Shang dynasty, as well as the ancient sage-kings of the Youyu-shi. He placed particular emphasis on punishment, demanding important cases be deliberated for around 6 days, and Shang punishments in particular be looked at. Finally, he noted not to follow the Mandate of Heaven blindly, and recalled that it is a fickle one that can be lost. Another document was produced named The Order of Bi (畢命), but the received text is forged. Sima Qian states that the text was regarding dividing the population into residential districts in Chengzhou (成周).

The Bamboo Annals records some details of King Kang's movements during his reign:

- During the first year of King Kang's reign, the feudal lords paid homage to him in Fengjing.
- During the third year, musical compositions were standardized, an auspicious di (禘) sacrifice was made towards the former lords, agricultural officers received charges to remind them of their duties, and an announcement was made at a temple.
- During the ninth year, the State of Tang (唐) moved to Jin (晉), built a beautiful palace, and King Kang sent a minister to remonstrate the ruler.
- During the twelfth year, King Kang bestowed an order upon the Duke of Bi.
- During the sixteenth year, King Kang bestowed a mandate upon the Duke of Qi, then toured the southern regions before arriving at Lushan along the Jiang River.
- King Kang would then die in his twenty-sixth year.

In his 23rd year, the Da Yu ding was commissioned, which features a speech by King Kang that took place in Zongzhou. Within, it details him recounting the successes of his predecessors to someone named Yu (盂), the grandson of Nangong Kuo (南宮括). He praised the conquest of the four directions by King Wen, and the prohibition of drunkenness by King Wu. He then thanks Yu for bringing him out of the "hazy dawn of his youth," enjoying that he was not coerced, merely guided. Then, King Kang promotes Yu to assist a minister named (榮) in maintaining harmonious virtue, act as an overseer of the military (司戎), remonstrate him when he errs, and receive charges from those in the four directions. King Kang then gave Yu sacrificial goods and the banner of Yu's father to lead in hunting, along with four state officials with 659 charioteers and common peasants, seemingly to assist. He also gave Yu 13 officers of high ranking and 1,050 servants to disperse to their proper lands. King Kang desired Yu to emulate the success of his grandfather. Yu had the ding cast themselves.

The Zuo Zhuan mentions King Kang in passing:

康王息民，並建母弟，以蕃屏周，亦曰，吾無專享文武之功，且為後人之迷敗傾覆而溺入于難，則振救之。
King Kang gave rest to the people and established his maternal uncles as fiefs to serve as a protective barrier for Zhou. It was also said, "I shall not exclusively enjoy the achievements of Wenwang and Wugong, but will instead rescue future generations from confusion, collapse, and drowning in calamity."

== Legacy ==
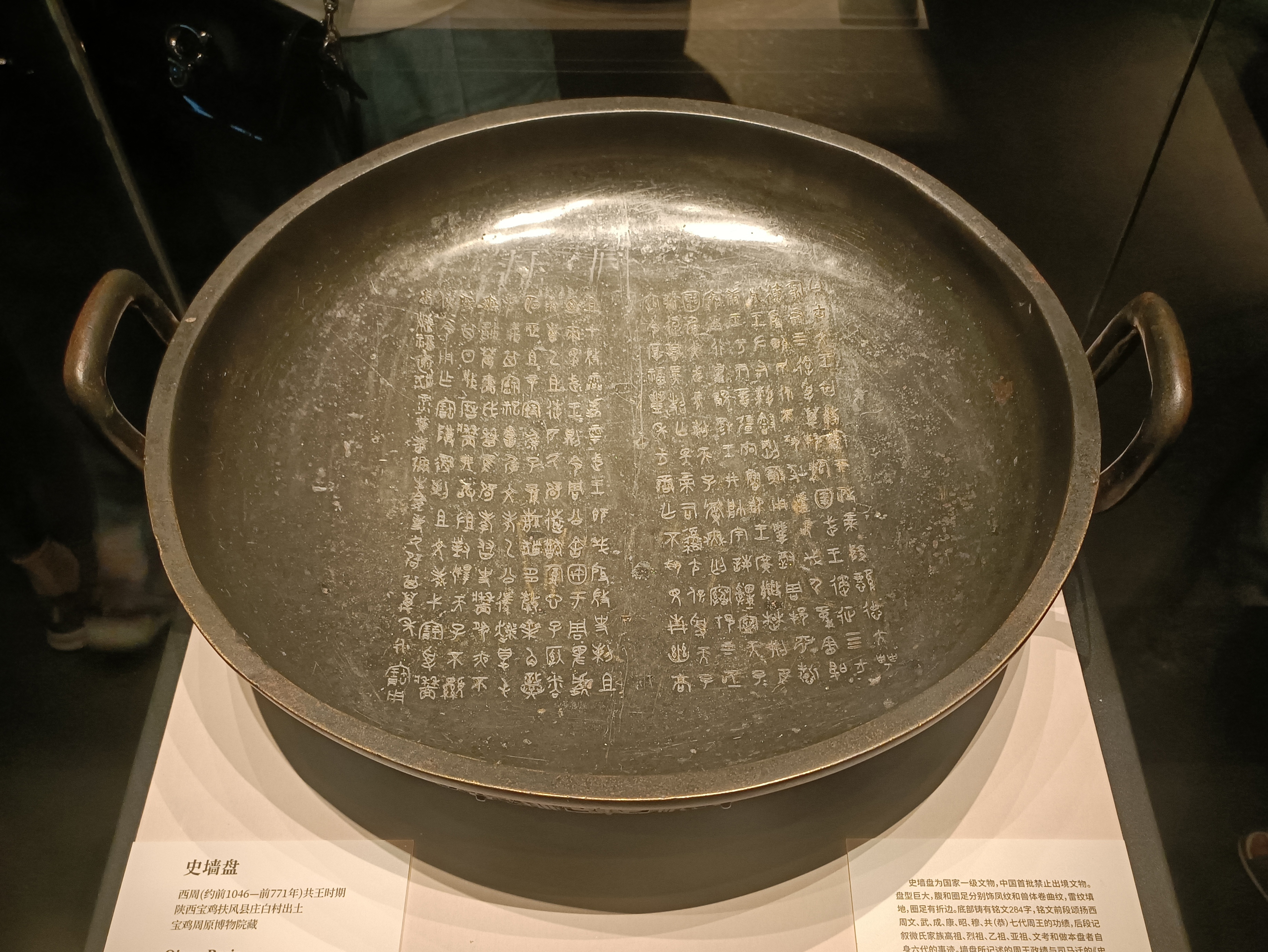
The Qiang pan, which mentions various achievements of the first seven Zhou kings.

Later Zhou rulers, such as King Xuan of Zhou, would find themselves looking back on the rule of King Kang, mentioning him alongside his predecessors when considering the brighter days of the dynasty.

However, during the Han dynasty, King Kang sees some criticism. In Lunheng, Wang Chong mentions a myth amongst contemporary scholars that the Classic of Poetry was written during a time in which the Zhou dynasty was declining. They would often claim that it began composition around the time of King Kang's reign, accusing his ministers of being lazy and corrupt. However, Wang retorts: He believed that Zhou reached its peak with King Kang, benefitting from the gains made by King Wen and King Wu. Therefore, the Classic of Poetry could not have been composed if Zhou had not yet declined. He then accuses Qin Shi Huang's Burning of books and burying of scholars as the reason why so few examples of pre-Classic of Poetry verse are extant.

In Lienü Zhuan, King Kang's wife is mentioned as an example of how a lesser transgression can lead to a greater one, mentioning the legendary falls of Shang due to Daji, and the fall of Zhou due to Bao Si prior.

周之康王夫人，晏出朝關雎預見，思得淑女以配君子。
When the wife of King Kang of Zhou once emerged late from her chamber to attend court, the poem Guan Ju had foreseen this, longing for a virtuous lady to match a noble lord.

However, the Book of the Later Han claims that Guan Ju was composed as a gentle satire regarding King Kang being late to court one day. It also notes that King Kang enjoyed favourable relations with the Sushen of the Dongyi, who would present the Zhou with stone arrows.

== Family ==
Queens:

- Wang Jiang, of the Jiang clan (王姜 姜姓), the mother of Crown Prince Xia

Sons:

- Crown Prince Xia (太子瑕; 1027–977 BC), ruled as King Zhao of Zhou from 995–977 BC

== See also ==
- Family tree of Chinese monarchs (ancient)

King Kang of Zhou Zhou dynasty Died: 996 BC
Regnal titles
Preceded by King Cheng of Zhou	King of China; 1020–996 BC	Succeeded by King Zhao of Zhou
