= Xiong Yan (elder) =

Viscount of Chu (died 847 BC)

Xiong Yan 熊延

Viscount of Chu
- Reign: ?–847 BC
- Predecessor: Xiong Zhi
- Successor: Xiong Yong
- Died: 847 BC
- Issue: Xiong Yong; Xiong Yan
Names
- Ancestral name: Mǐ (羋); Lineage name: Xióng (熊); Given name: Yán (延) or Zhící (執疵) or Zhìxiá (摯瑕)
- House: Mi
- Dynasty: Chu
- Father: Xiong Qu

Xiong Yan (Chinese: 熊延) was a ruler of the Chu state.

Xiong Yan succeeded his older brother, Xiong Zhi, who abdicated due to illness. The Records of the Grand Historian states that he killed Xiong Zhi and usurped the throne, but this account is contradicted by Zuo Zhuan and Guoyu.

Xiong Yan died in 847 BC and was succeeded by his elder son, Xiong Yong. His younger son, Xiong Yan (熊嚴; different name with identical romanisation when tone marks are excluded), ascended the throne after Xiong Yong's death.

Xiong Yan House of Mi Died: 848 BC
Regnal titles
Preceded by Xiong Zhi	Viscount of Chu ?–848 BC	Succeeded by Xiong Yong
