= Xiong Sheng =

Xiong Sheng 熊勝

Viscount of Chu
- Reign: ?–?
- Predecessor: Xiong Dan
- Successor: Xiong Yang
Names
- Ancestral name: Mǐ (羋); Lineage name: Xióng (熊); Given name: Shèng (勝) or Fán (樊) or Pán (盘)
- House: Mi
- Dynasty: Chu
- Father: Xiong Dan

Xiong Sheng (Chinese: 熊勝) was a viscount of the Chu state. Xiong Sheng succeeded his father, Xiong Dan, and was succeeded by his younger brother, Xiong Yang.

Xiong Sheng House of Mi
Regnal titles
Preceded by Xiong Dan	Viscount of Chu	Succeeded by Xiong Yang
