= Xiong Dan =

Xiong Dan 熊䵣

Viscount of Chu
- Reign: c. 941 BC
- Predecessor: Xiong Ai
- Successor: Xiong Sheng
- Issue: Xiong Sheng; Xiong Yang
Names
- Ancestral name: Mǐ (羋); Lineage name: Xióng (熊); Given name: Dàn (䵣 or 黮)
- House: Mi
- Dynasty: Chu
- Father: Xiong Ai

Xiong Dan (Chinese: 熊䵣) was a viscount of the Chu state. He succeeded his father, Xiong Ai, and was in turn succeeded by his son, Xiong Sheng.

According to the Bamboo Annals, after the death of King Zhao of Zhou during his expedition against Chu, his son King Mu of Zhou again attacked Chu in 941 BC and was again defeated. It is generally believed that this happened during Xiong Dan's reign.

Xiong Dan House of Mi
Regnal titles
Preceded by Xiong Ai	Viscount of Chu c. 941 BC	Succeeded by Xiong Sheng
