= Xiong Shuang =

Xiong Shuang 熊霜

Viscount of Chu
- Reign: 827–822 BC
- Predecessor: Xiong Yan
- Successor: Xiong Xun
- Died: 822 BC
Names
- Ancestral name: Mǐ (羋); Lineage name: Xióng (熊); Given name: Shuāng (霜) or Xiāng (相)
- House: Mi
- Dynasty: Chu
- Father: Xiong Yan

Xiong Shuang (Chinese: 熊霜) was a ruler of the Chu state, reigning from 827 BC to 822 BC.

Xiong Shuang succeeded his father, Xiong Yan, who died in 828 BC. Xiong Shuang had three younger brothers: Xiong Xue (熊雪), Xiong Kan (熊堪), and Xiong Xun. When Xiong Shuang died in 822 BC, his brothers fought one another for the throne. The youngest brother, Xiong Xun, was ultimately victorious and ascended the throne, while Xiong Xue was killed and Xiong Kan escaped to Pu (濮).

Xiong Shuang House of Mi Died: 822 BC
Regnal titles
Preceded by Xiong Yan (younger)	Viscount of Chu; 827–822 BC	Succeeded by Xiong Xun
