= Wang Jiang (queen) =

Wang Jiang (died 10th century BC) was the queen consort of King Kang of Zhou.

She appears to have played a significant political role, handling the economic affairs of the imperial family, accompanying the king on military campaigns and rewarding officials on his request.
