= Xiong Zhi =

Xiong Zhi 熊摯

Viscount of Chu
- Reign: ?–?
- Predecessor: Xiong Kang
- Successor: Xiong Yan
Names
- Ancestral name: Mǐ (羋); Lineage name: Xióng (熊); Given name: Zhì (摯) or Zhìhóng (摯紅)
- House: Mi
- Dynasty: Chu; Kui
- Father: Xiong Qu

Xiong Zhi (Chinese: 熊摯) was a ruler of the Chu state, who later became the founding monarch of the Kui (夔) state.

Xiong Zhi succeeded his father, Xiong Kang, but later abdicated due to illness. His younger brother, Xiong Yan, succeeded him as ruler of Chu, and Xiong Zhi self-exiled and founded the minor state of Kui.

The Records of the Grand Historian states Xiong Zhi's name variously as Xiong Hong (熊紅) or Xiong Zhihong (熊摯紅), and says that he was the second son of Xiong Qu and younger brother of Xiong Kang. According to the Records of the Grand Historian, Xiong Kang died early and Xiong Zhi succeeded Xiong Qu, and that he was killed by his younger brother, Xiong Yan. However, this account is contradicted by earlier historical texts Zuo Zhuan and Guoyu, as well as the account in the Xinian in the recently discovered Tsinghua Bamboo Slips.

Xiong Zhi House of Mi
Regnal titles
Preceded by Xiong Kang	Viscount of Chu	Succeeded by Xiong Yan (elder)
