= Xiong E =

Xiong E 熊咢

Viscount of Chu
- Reign: 799–791 BC
- Predecessor: Xiong Xun
- Successor: Ruo'ao
- Died: 791 BC
- Issue: Ruo'ao
Names
- Ancestral name: Mǐ (羋); Lineage name: Xióng (熊); Given name: È (咢)
- House: Mi
- Dynasty: Chu
- Father: Xiong Xun

Xiong E (Chinese: 熊咢) was viscount of the Chu state from 799 BC to 791 BC.

Xiong E succeeded his father, Xiong Xun, to the Chu throne. He died after nine years of reign and was succeeded by his son, Ruo'ao.

Xiong E House of Mi Died: 791 BC
Regnal titles
| Preceded by Xiong Xun | Viscount of Chu; 799–791 BC | Succeeded by Ruo'ao |
