= Xiong Xun =

Xiong Xun 熊徇

Viscount of Chu
- Reign: 821–800 BC
- Predecessor: Xiong Shuang
- Successor: Xiong E
- Died: 800 BC
- Issue: Xiong E
Names
- Ancestral name: Mǐ (羋); Lineage name: Xióng (熊); Given name: Xùn (徇) or Jìxùn (季徇) or Xùn (訓)
- House: Mi
- Dynasty: Chu
- Father: Xiong Yan

Xiong Xun (Chinese: 熊徇) was the monarch of the Chu state from 821 BC to 800 BC.

Xiong Xun's father, Xiong Yan, had four sons: Xiong Shuang, Xiong Xue (熊雪), Xiong Kan (熊堪), and Xiong Xun, the youngest. When Xiong Yan died in 828 BC he was succeeded by his first son Xiong Shuang. However, when Xiong Shuang died in 822 bce, the remaining three brothers fought one another for the throne. Xiong Xun was ultimately victorious and ascended the throne, while Xiong Xue was killed and Xiong Kan escaped to Pu (濮).

Xiong Xun reigned for 22 years until his death in 800 BC. He was succeeded by his son, Xiong E.

Xiong Xun House of Mi Died: 800 BC
Regnal titles
Preceded by Xiong Shuang	Viscount of Chu; 821–800 BC	Succeeded by Xiong E
