= Ruo'ao =

Xiong Yi
- Ruler of Chu
- Reign: 790–764 BC
Full name
- Clan name: 姓 Ancestral temple surname: Mǐ (羋); 氏 Lineage surname: Xióng (熊); Given name: Yí (儀)
Posthumous name
- Ruo'ao

Ruo'ao (Chinese: 若敖, died 764 BC) was from 790 to 764 BC the monarch of the state of Chu during the Western Zhou dynasty of ancient China. Born Xiong Yi (熊儀), he was the first Chu ruler to be given a posthumous title.

Like other early Chu rulers, Ruo'ao held the hereditary noble rank that was first granted to his ancestor Xiong Yi (熊繹, identical romanisation but different Chinese characters), by King Cheng of Zhou.

Ruo'ao succeeded his father Xiong E, who died in 791 BC. He reigned for 27 years and was succeeded by his son Xiao'ao.

Ruo'ao House of Mi Died: 764 bce
Regnal titles
Preceded by Xiong E	Viscount of Chu; 790–764 bce	Succeeded by Xiao'ao
