= Xiong Yang =

Xiong Yang 熊楊

Viscount of Chu
- Reign: ?–?
- Predecessor: Xiong Sheng
- Successor: Xiong Qu
- Issue: Xiong Qu
Names
- Ancestral name: Mǐ (羋); Lineage name: Xióng (熊); Given name: Yáng (楊 or 鍚 or 煬)
- House: Mi
- Dynasty: Chu
- Father: Xiong Dan

Xiong Yang (Chinese: 熊楊) was a monarch of the Chu state. He was the younger son of Xiong Dan, and succeeded his older brother, Xiong Sheng, to the throne. He was in turn succeeded by his son, Xiong Qu.

Xiong Yang House of Mi
Regnal titles
Preceded by Xiong Sheng	Viscount of Chu	Succeeded by Xiong Qu
