= Xiong Qu =

Xiong Qu 熊渠

Viscount of Chu
- Reign: ?–?
- Predecessor: Xiong Yang
- Successor: Xiong Kang
- Issue: Xiong Kang
Names
- Ancestral name: Mǐ (羋); Lineage name: Xióng (熊); Given name: Qú (渠)
- House: Mi
- Dynasty: Chu
- Father: Xiong Yang

Xiong Qu (Chinese: 熊渠) was a viscount of the Chu state.

Xiong Qu succeeded his father, Xiong Yang, to the Chu throne. He was in turn succeeded by his son Xiong Kang. While the Records of the Grand Historian states that Xiong Kang died early and Xiong Qu was succeeded by Xiong Zhi, this contradicts with the record of the unearthed Tsinghua Bamboo Slips, which states that Xiong Qu was succeeded by Xiong Kang.

Xiong Qu House of Mi
Regnal titles
Preceded by Xiong Yang	Viscount of Chu	Succeeded by Xiong Kang
