= Xiong Yan (younger) =

Viscount of Chu (837–828 BCE)

Xiong Yan 熊嚴

Viscount of Chu
- Reign: 837–828 BC
- Predecessor: Xiong Yong
- Successor: Xiong Shuang
- Died: 828 BC
- Issue: Xiong Shuang; Xiong Xue (熊雪); Xiong Kan (熊堪); Xiong Xun
Names
- Ancestral name: Mǐ (羋); Lineage name: Xióng (熊); Given name: Yán (嚴)
- House: Mi
- Dynasty: Chu
- Father: Xiong Yan

Xiong Yan (Chinese: 熊嚴) was from 837 BC to 828 BC the ruler of the Chu state.

When Xiong Yan died in 828 BC, he was succeeded by his first son, Xiong Shuang. However, when Xiong Shuang died six years later, Xiong Yan's three younger sons fought one another for the throne. The youngest son, Xiong Xun, was ultimately victorious and ascended the throne, while Xiong Xue (熊雪) was killed and Xiong Kan (熊堪) escaped to Pu (濮).

Xiong Yan House of Mi Died: 828 BC
Regnal titles
Preceded by Xiong Yong	Viscount of Chu; 837–828 BC	Succeeded by Xiong Shuang
