= King Zhao of Zhou =

Fourth king of the Zhou dynasty

King Zhao of Zhou 周昭王
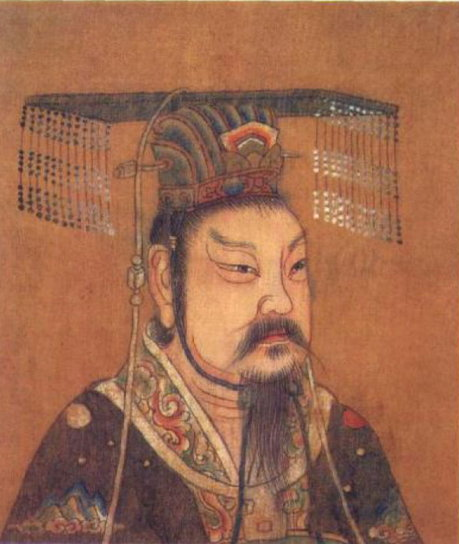
- Posthumous depiction from the Qing dynasty

King of the Zhou dynasty
- Reign: 977/75–957 BC
- Predecessor: King Kang of Zhou
- Successor: King Mu of Zhou
- Born: Ji Xia (姬瑕); 1027 BC
- Died: 957 BC †
- Spouse: Queen Fang
- Issue: King Mu of Zhou
Names
- Ancestral name: Jī (姬); Given name: Xiá (瑕)
Posthumous name
- King Zhao (昭王) or King Shao (邵王)
- House: Ji
- Dynasty: Zhou (Western Zhou)
- Father: King Kang of Zhou
- Mother: Wang Jiang

King Zhao of Zhou

Posthumous name
- Chinese: 周昭王
- Literal meaning: The Luminous King of Zhou; The Illustrious King of Zhou
Transcriptions
Standard Mandarin
- Hanyu Pinyin: Zhōu Zhāo Wáng
- Wade–Giles: Chou Chao-wang; King Chao of Chou

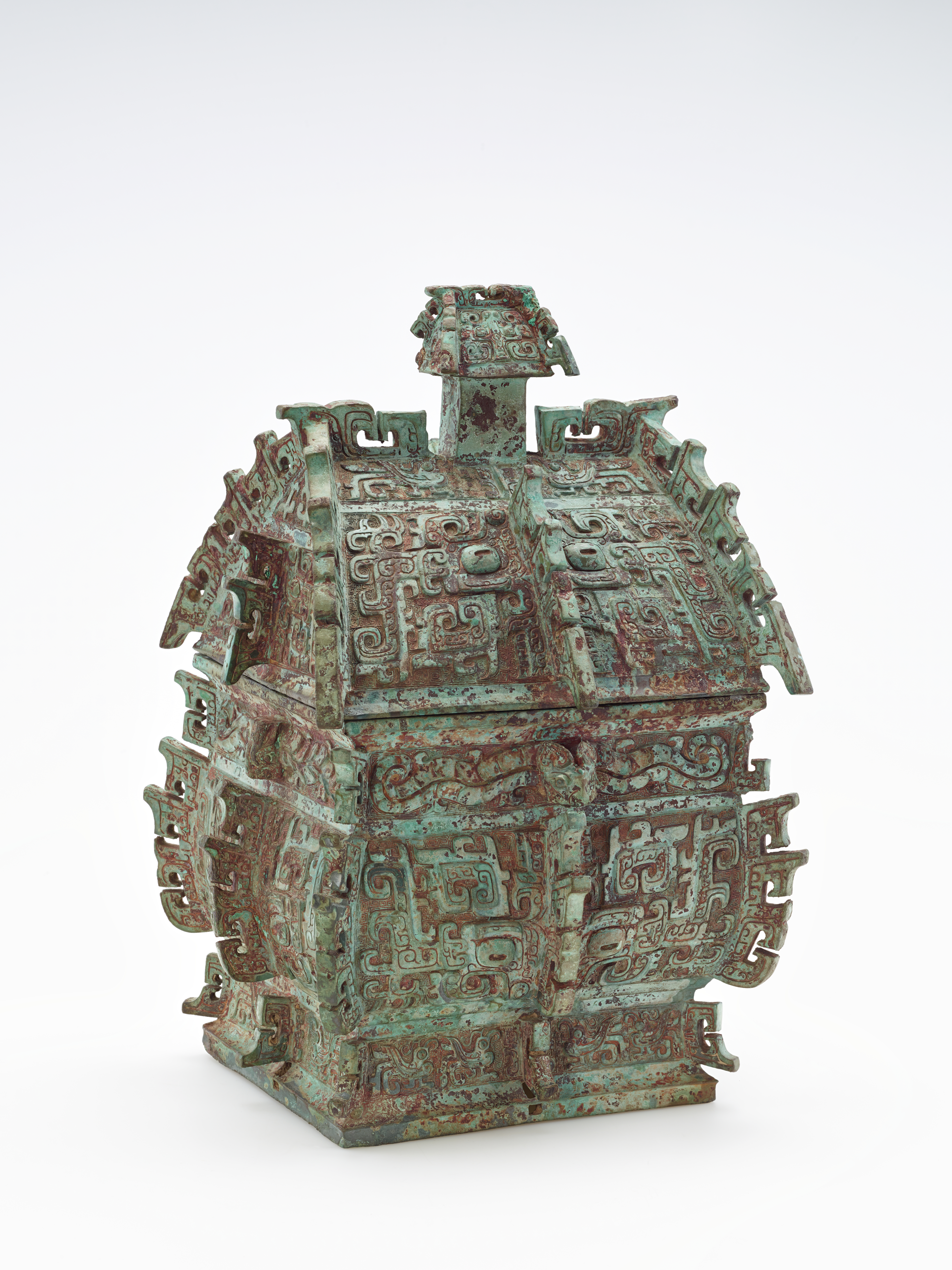
Fangyi with cast inscription of 187 characters (one of the longest texts from the early Zhou period) which commemorates three days of administrative meetings and ritual ceremonies held in Chengzhou during the reign of King Zhao. Freer Gallery of Art

King Zhao of Zhou (Chinese: 周昭王; pinyin: Zhōu Zhāo Wáng; 1027–957 BC), personal name Ji Xia, was the fourth king of the Zhou dynasty of China. He ruled from 977/75 BC until his death twenty years later. Famous for his disastrous war against the Chu confederation, his death in battle ended the Western Zhou's early expansion and marked the beginning of his dynasty's decline.

== Life ==
By the time of King Zhao's coronation, his father King Kang and grandfather King Cheng had conquered and colonized the Central Plains of China, forcing most of the northern and eastern tribal peoples into vassalage. Only the Dongyi of eastern Shandong continued their resistance, but they were no longer a threat to Zhou rule. As result, King Zhao inherited a prospering kingdom, and could afford to build a new ancestral temple for his father. This temple, known as “Kang gong”, was built in line with ritual reforms of the time and would grow into “one of the two central temples of dynastic worship”, the other being the much older “jinggong” temple.

With the north and east pacified and a large military force under his control, King Zhao turned his attention to the Yangtze basin. This region of great mineral wealth was under the control of the confederation of Chu, with whom the Zhou kingdom had been on good terms for almost two centuries. Under King Zhao, the relationship between Zhou and Chu deteriorated, however, as Chu continued its aggressive expansion and Zhou's demand for gold, copper and tin grew. As hostilities grew, border clashes ensued that eventually escalated into open war. No longer tolerating Chu's perceived defiance, Zhao invaded the Chu confederation in 961 BC. He initially conquered the region to the north of the Yangtze, and then defeated and subdued the 26 states of the Han River valley, including Chu. Most likely unable to permanently occupy the latter region, Zhao eventually retreated with much loot.

In 957 BC, Zhao launched another major military campaign into the middle Yangtze region. Employing half of the royal forces, organized into the "Six Armies of the West", he probably aimed to permanently bring the Yangtze basin under his control. This campaign, however, ended in disaster as the Zhou forces were defeated and almost entirely wiped out. King Zhao and his remaining troops allegedly drowned while retreating across the Han River.

== Legacy ==
Zhao's death and defeat greatly damaged the Zhou dynasty's reputation and ended its early expansion, resulting in several foreign invasions of the kingdom. His successor and son King Mu of Zhou was able to restabilise the kingdom, but the Yangtze basin became the permanent southern limit of Western Zhou's direct control. Despite his “humiliating end”, however, King Zhao was still commemorated for his southern campaigns during the Western Zhou dynasty, as he had at least established political dominance over the region to the north of the Yangtze and east of the Han River. After his death, he was also given a sacrificial site at the “Kang gong” temple he had himself built. As the first Zhou ruler to be enshrined this way, he eventually became a key figure for ancestor veneration of the middle Zhou dynasty. One major reason for the initially positive appraisal of his reign was possibly that later Zhou rulers did not want their ancestor being remembered for a defeat that cast shame upon the dynasty.

Later moralistic renditions of King Zhao's life were much more unfavorable, as they portrayed him as a ruler who loved pleasure and disregarded politics, dying on a hunting trip to the south. Later Chu poets also wrote about King Zhao in the Classical Chinese poetry collection "Heavenly Questions", mocking him for his perceived arrogance. An especially bizarre incident relating to King Zhao happened in the seventh century BC: When a coalition of Zhou states attacked the state of Chu, the latter sent a delegation to ask what reasons they could have for invading. The northern lords gave the feeble pretext that “King Zhao had failed to return from his southward expedition (which took place some three centuries earlier) and they had 'come to investigate'."

== Family ==
Queens:

- Queen Fang, of the Qi clan (房後 祁姓), the mother of Crown Prince Man

Sons:

- Crown Prince Man (太子滿; 992–922 BC), ruled as King Mu of Zhou from 976 to 922 BC

== See also ==
- Family tree of Chinese monarchs (ancient)

== Bibliography ==
- Blakeley, Barry B. (1999). "The Geography of Chu". In Constance A. Cook; John S. Major (eds.). Defining Chu: Image And Reality In Ancient China. Honolulu: University of Hawaii Press. pp. 9–20. ISBN 0824829050.
- Hawkes, David (1985). The Songs of the South: An Ancient Chinese Anthology of Poems by Qu Yuan and Other Poets. London: Penguin Books. ISBN 978-0-14-044375-2.
- Higham, Charles (2004). Encyclopedia of Ancient Asian Civilizations. New York City: Infobase Publishing. ISBN 0-8160-4640-9.
- Kern, Martin (2009). "Bronze Inscriptions, the Shijing and the Shangshu: the evolution of the ancestral sacrifice during the Western Zhou". In John Lagerwey; Marc Kalinowski (eds.). Early Chinese Religion: Part One: Shang Through Han (1250 BC-220 AD). Leiden: Brill Publishers. pp. 143–200. ISBN 978-90-04-168350.
- Li, Feng (2006). Axel Menges (ed.). Landscape and Power in Early China: The Crisis and Fall of the Western Zhou 1045-771 BC. Cambridge, New York City, Melbourne, et al.: Cambridge University Press. ISBN 0-521-85272-2.
- Li, Feng (2013). Early China: A Social and Cultural History. Cambridge: Cambridge University Press. ISBN 978-0-521-71981-0.
- Shaughnessy, Edward L. (1999a). "Calendar and Chronology". In Michael Loewe; Edward L. Shaughnessy (eds.). The Cambridge History of ancient China - From the Origins of Civilization to 221 B.C. Cambridge, New York, Melbourne, et al.: Cambridge University Press. pp. 19–29. ISBN 9780521470308.
- Shaughnessy, Edward L. (1999b). "Western Zhou History". In Michael Loewe; Edward L. Shaughnessy (eds.). The Cambridge History of ancient China - From the Origins of Civilization to 221 B.C. Cambridge, New York City, Melbourne, et al.: Cambridge University Press. pp. 292–351. ISBN 0-521-47030-7.
- Whiting, Marvin C. (2002). Imperial Chinese Military History: 8000 BC-1912 AD. Lincoln: iUniverse. ISBN 0-595-22134-3.

King Zhao of Zhou Zhou dynasty Died: 977 BC
Regnal titles
Preceded by King Kang of Zhou	King of China; 977/75–957 BC	Succeeded by King Mu of Zhou
