= Military ranks of the Republic of China (1912–1949) =

The military ranks of the Republic of China (1912–1949) were the military insignia used by the Beiyang Army, National Revolutionary Army, Republic of China Navy, and Republic of China Air Force. The ranks were introduced following the abdication of the Xuantong Emperor and continued to be used by the Republic of China Armed Forces, following the retreat to Taiwan.

== Army ranks ==
=== Commissioned officer ranks ===
The rank insignia of commissioned officers.

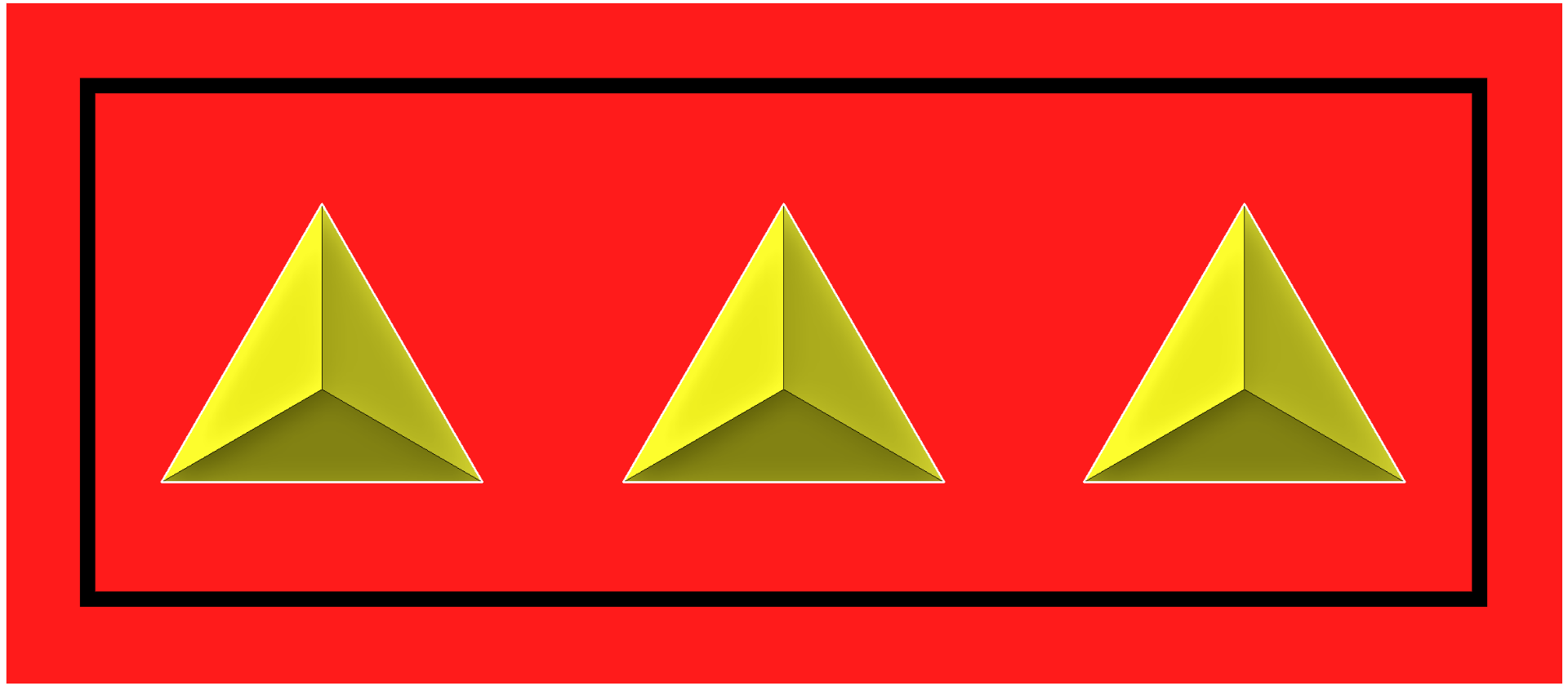
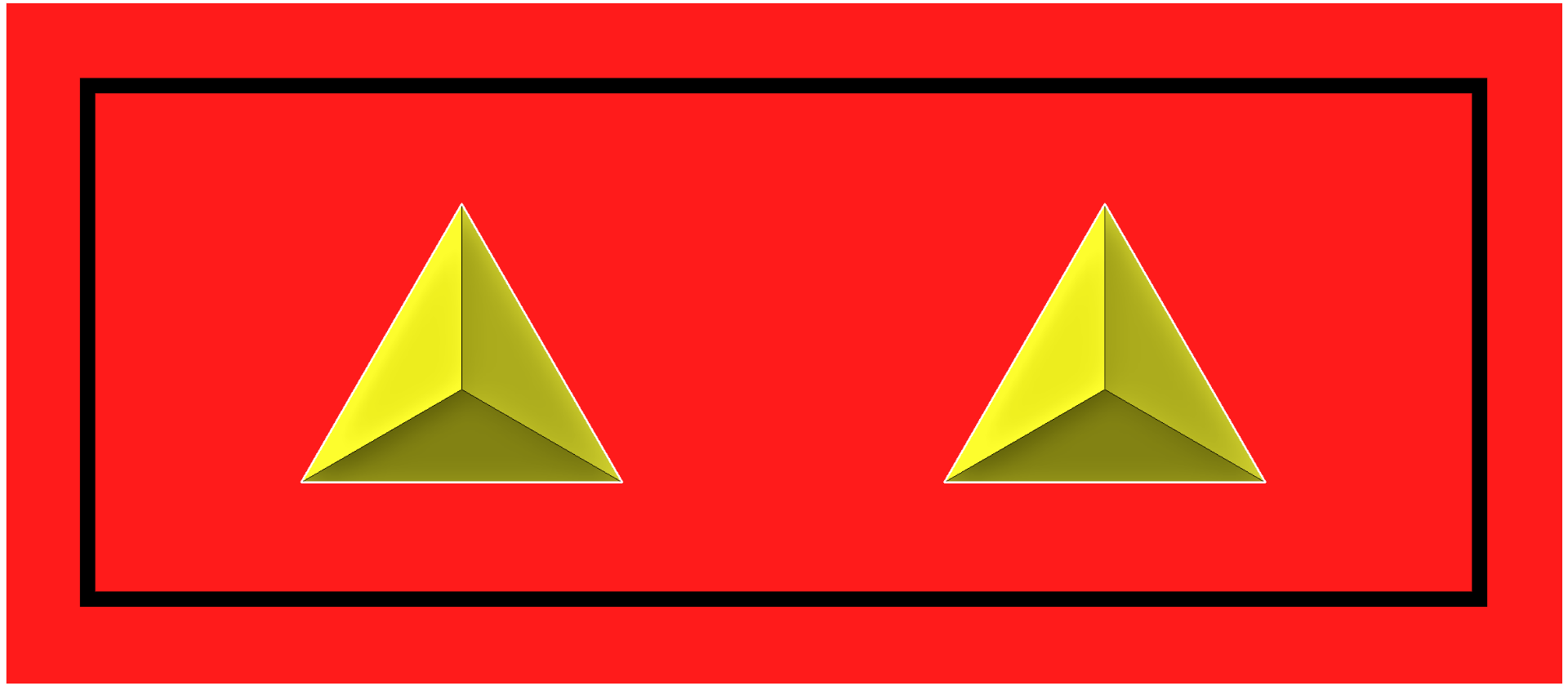
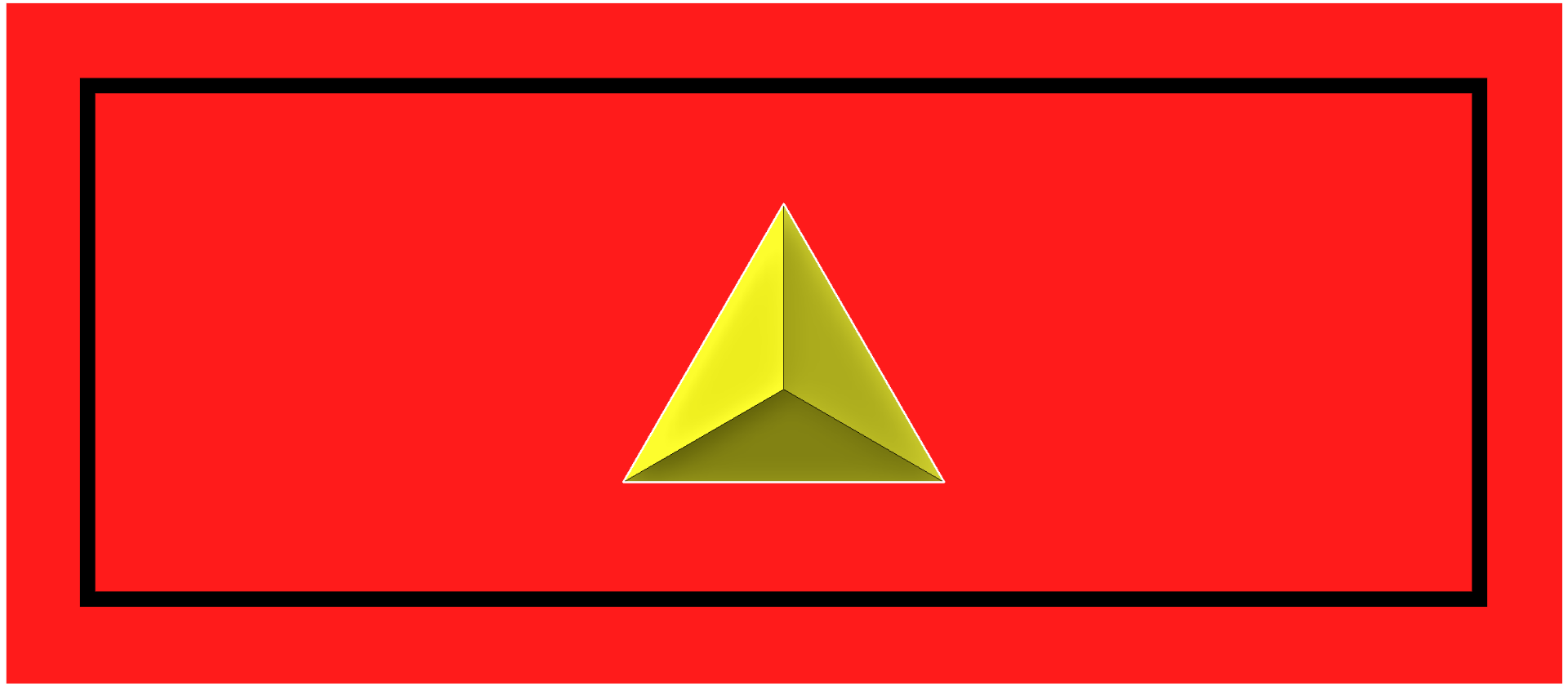
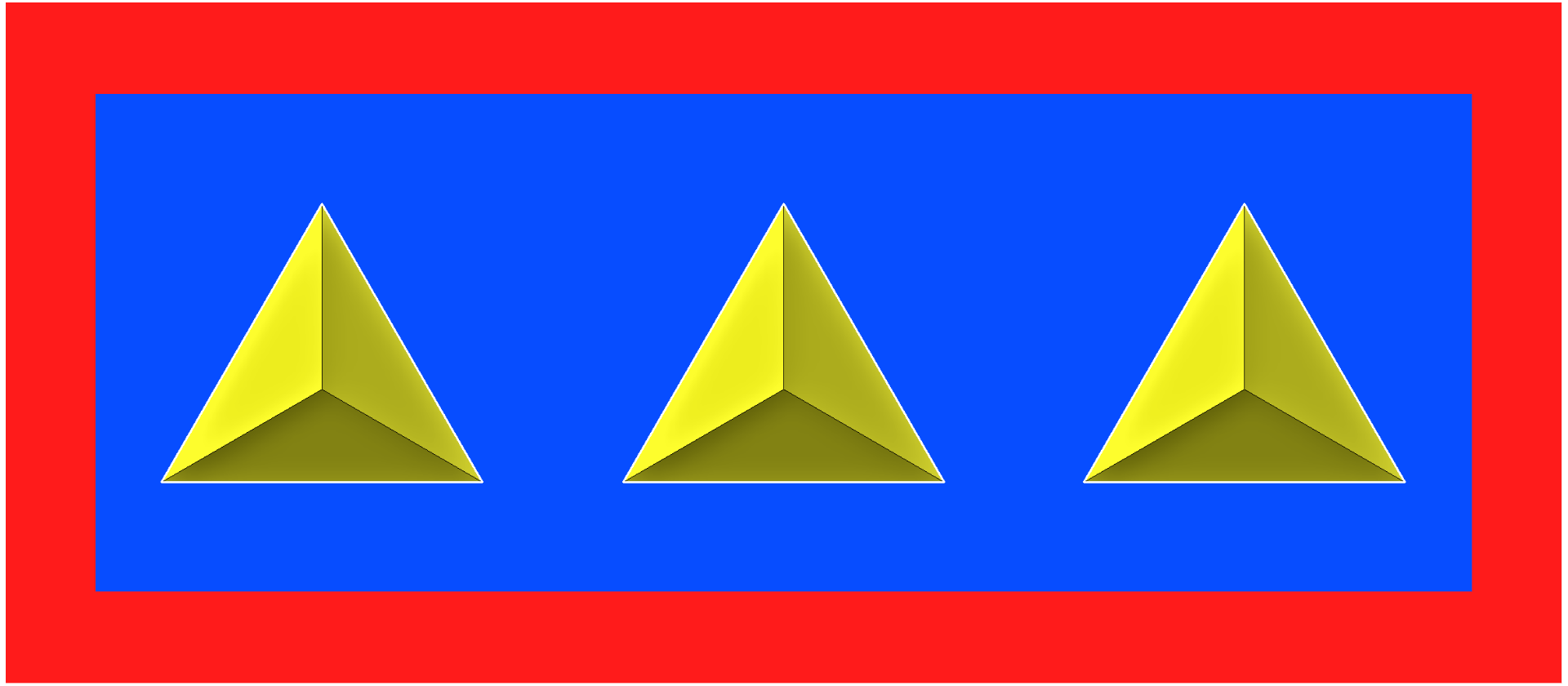
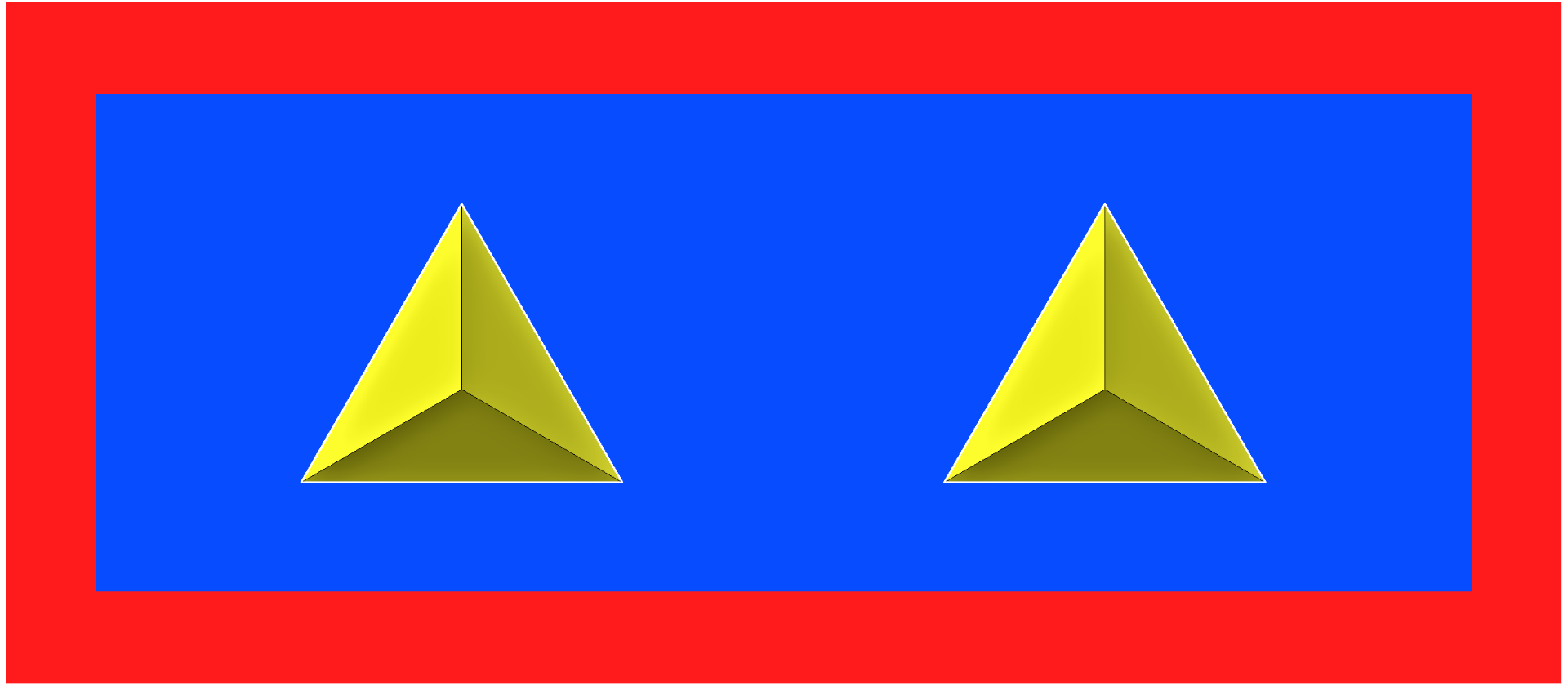
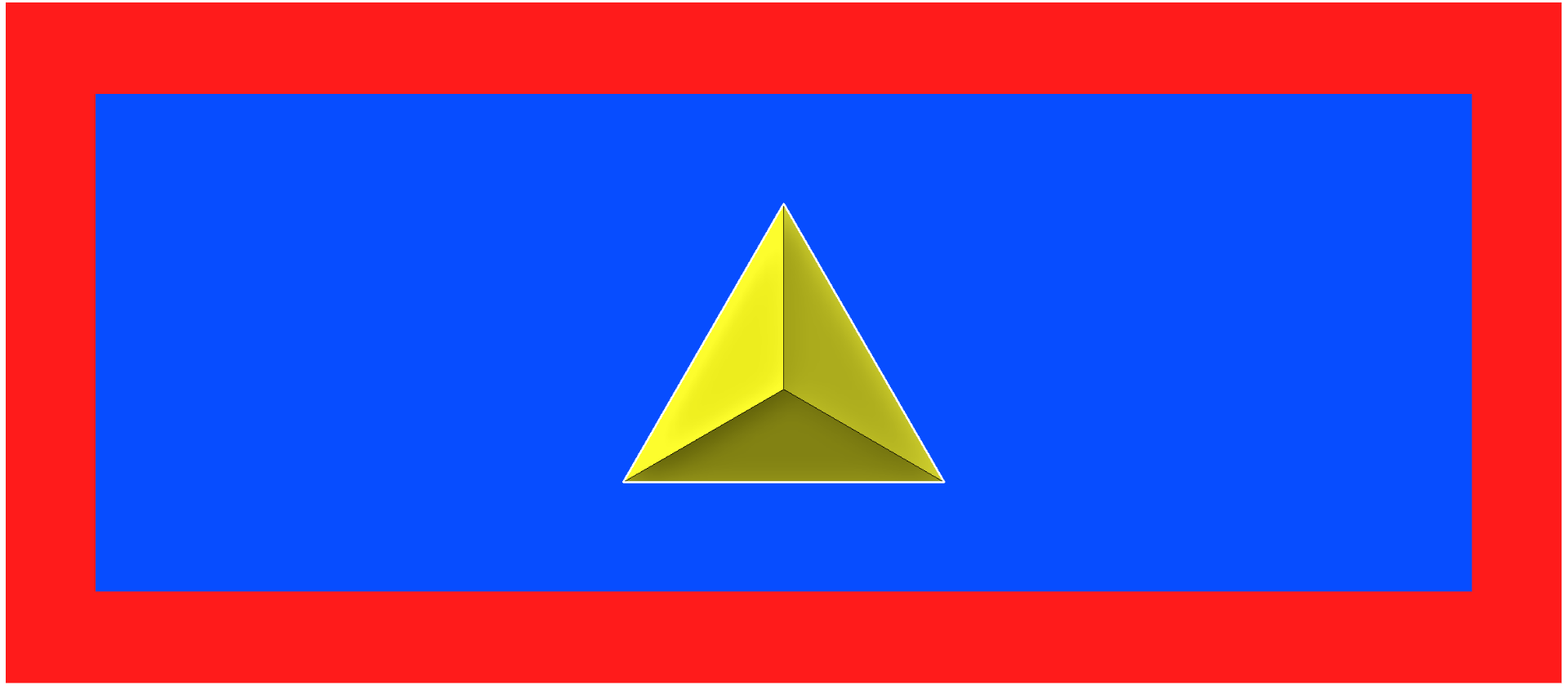
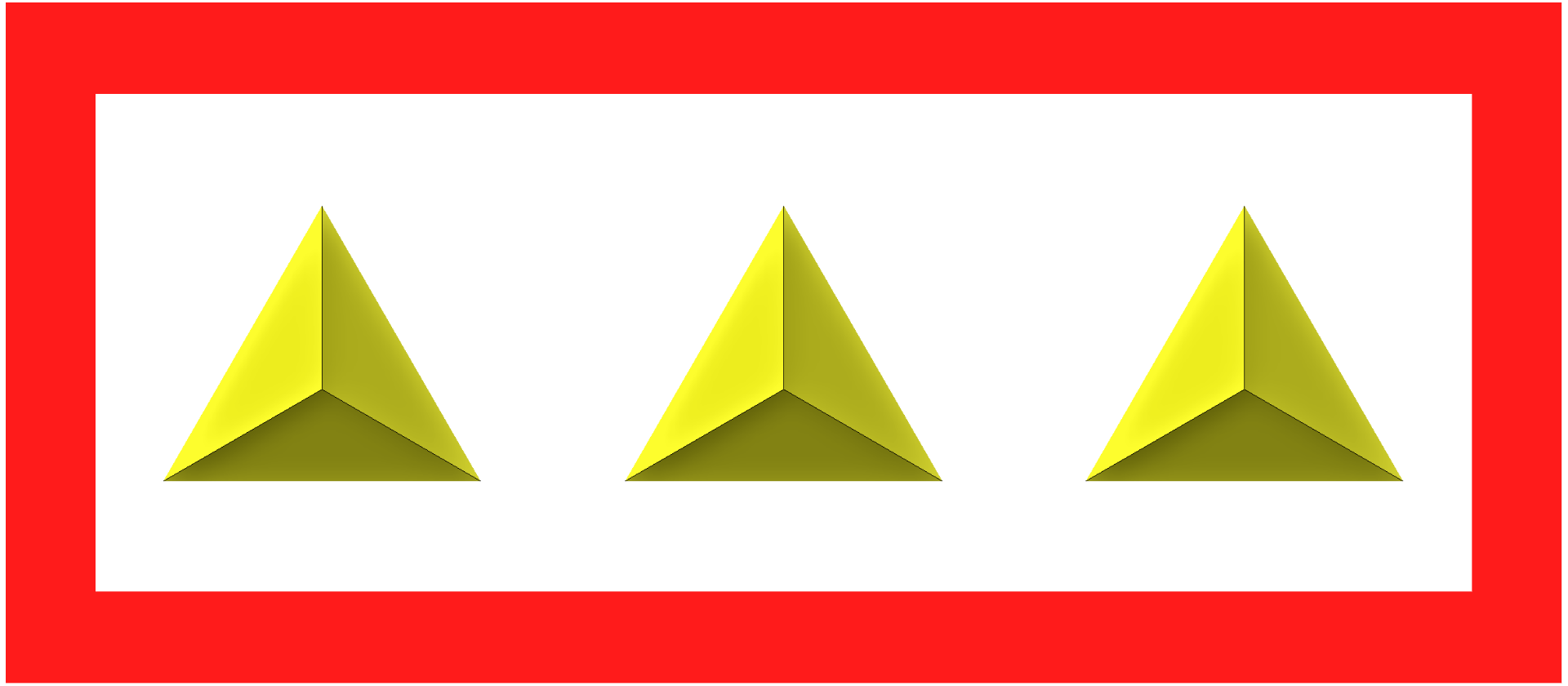
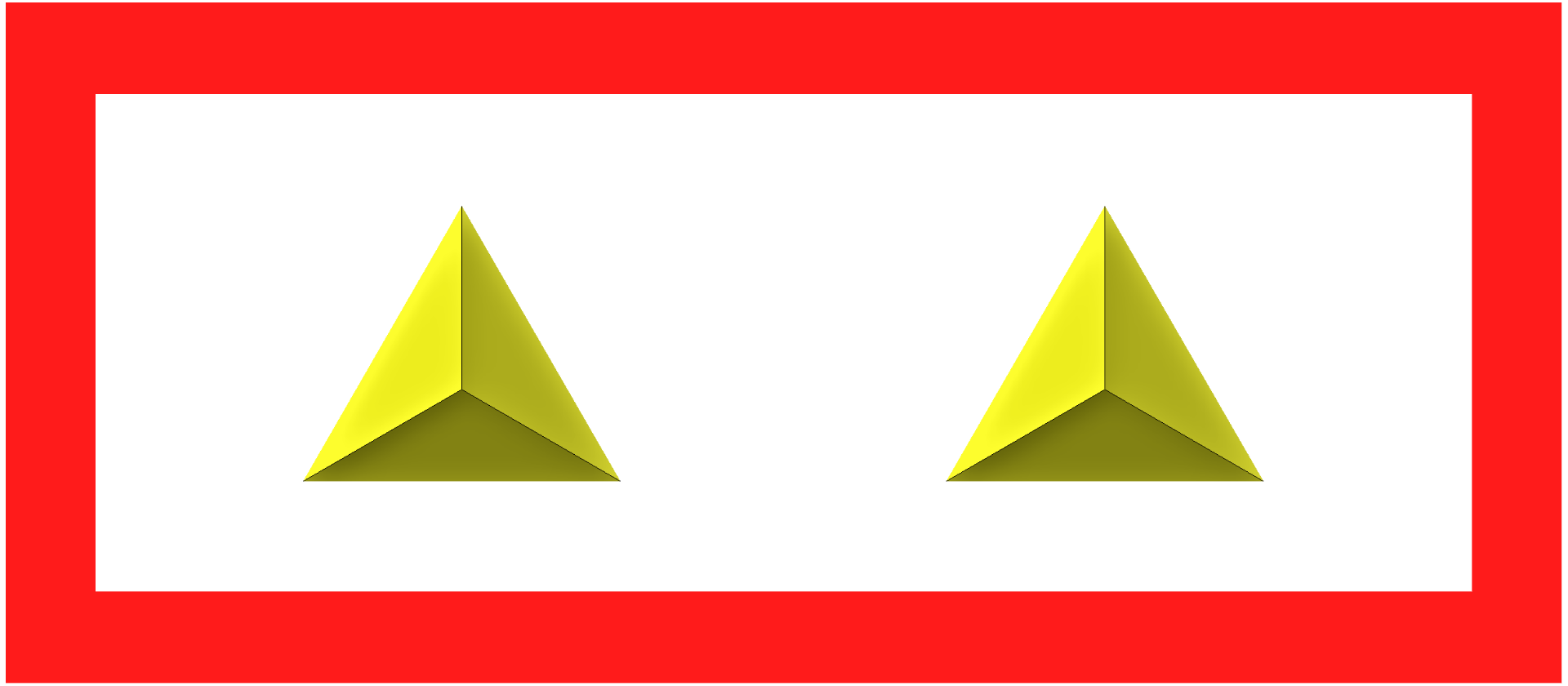
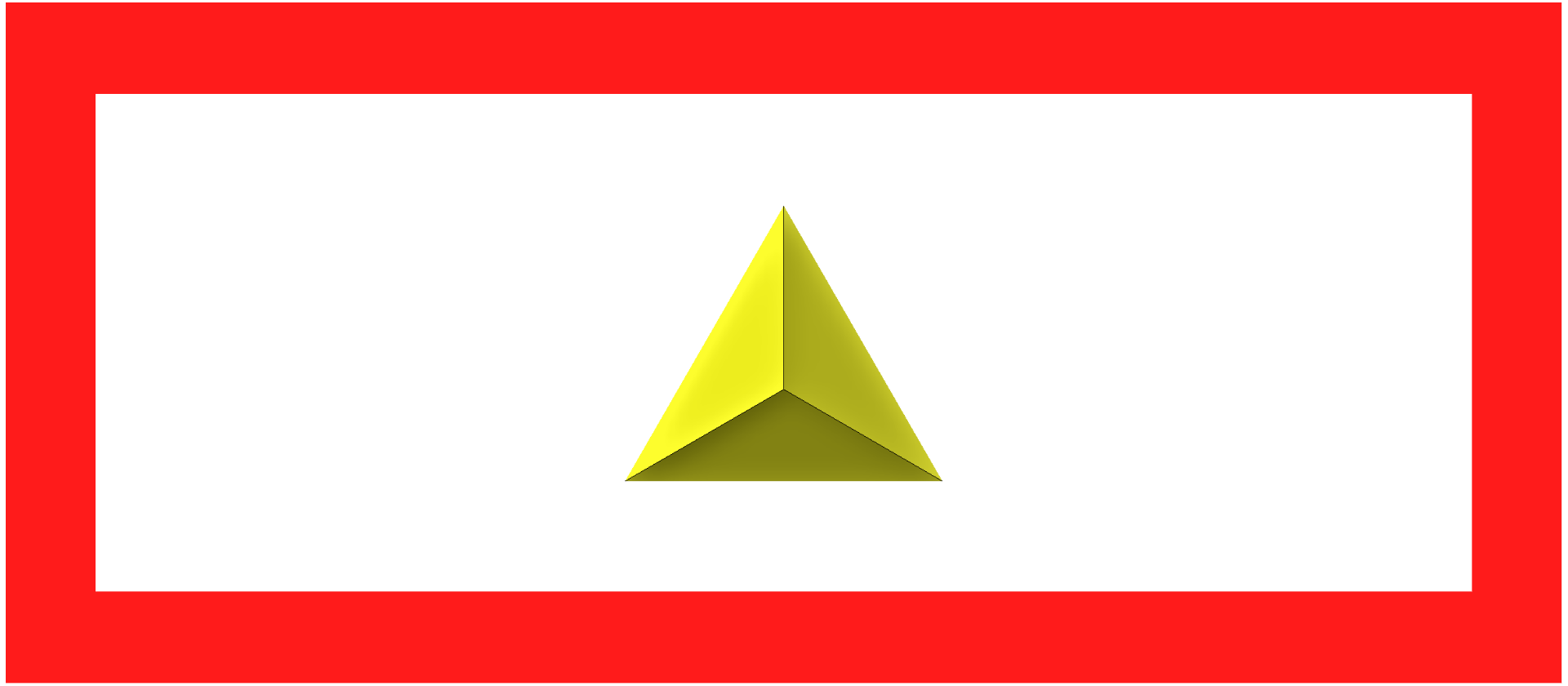
| Rank group | General / flag officers | | | | | Senior officers | | | Junior officers |
|---|---|---|---|---|---|---|---|---|---|---|---|---|
| 1912–1928 |
| 1912–1928 | | | 一等一级; Yīděng yījí | 一等二级; Yīděng èrjí | 一等三级; Yīděng sānjí | 二等一级; Èrděng yījí | 二等二级; Èīděng èrjí | 二等三级; Èīděng sānjí | 三等一级; Sānděng yījí | 三等二级; Sānděng èrjí | 三等三级; Sānděng sānjí | 等外军官; Děng wài jūnguān |
| 1929 |
| 1929 | | | 上將; Shàngjiàng | 中將; Zhōngjiàng | 少將; Shàojiàng | 上校; Shàngxiào | 中校; Zhōngxiào | 少校; Shàoxiào | 上尉; Shàngwèi | 中尉; Zhōngwèi | 少尉; Shàowèi |
| 1929–1936 |
| 1929–1936 | | | 上將; Shàngjiàng | 中將; Zhōngjiàng | 少將; Shàojiàng | 上校; Shàngxiào | 中校; Zhōngxiào | 少校; Shàoxiào | 上尉; Shàngwèi | 中尉; Zhōngwèi | 少尉; Shàowèi | 准尉; Zhǔnwèi |
| 1936–1946 |
| 1936–1946 | 特級上將; Tèjí shàngjiàng | 一級上將; Yījí shàngjiàng | 二級上將; Èrjí shàngjiàng | 中將; Zhōngjiàng | 少將; Shàojiàng | 上校; Shàngxiào | 中校; Zhōngxiào | 少校; Shàoxiào | 上尉; Shàngwèi | 中尉; Zhōngwèi | 少尉; Shàowèi | 准尉; Zhǔnwèi |
| 1946–1949 |
| 1946–1949 | 特級上將; Tèjí shàngjiàng | 一級上將; Yījí shàngjiàng | 二級上將; Èrjí shàngjiàng | 中將; Zhōngjiàng | 少將; Shàojiàng | 上校; Shàngxiào | 中校; Zhōngxiào | 少校; Shàoxiào | 上尉; Shàngwèi | 中尉; Zhōngwèi | 少尉; Shàowèi |
| Rank group | General / flag officers | | | | | Senior officers | | | Junior officers |

=== Other ranks ===
The rank insignia of non-commissioned officers and enlisted personnel.

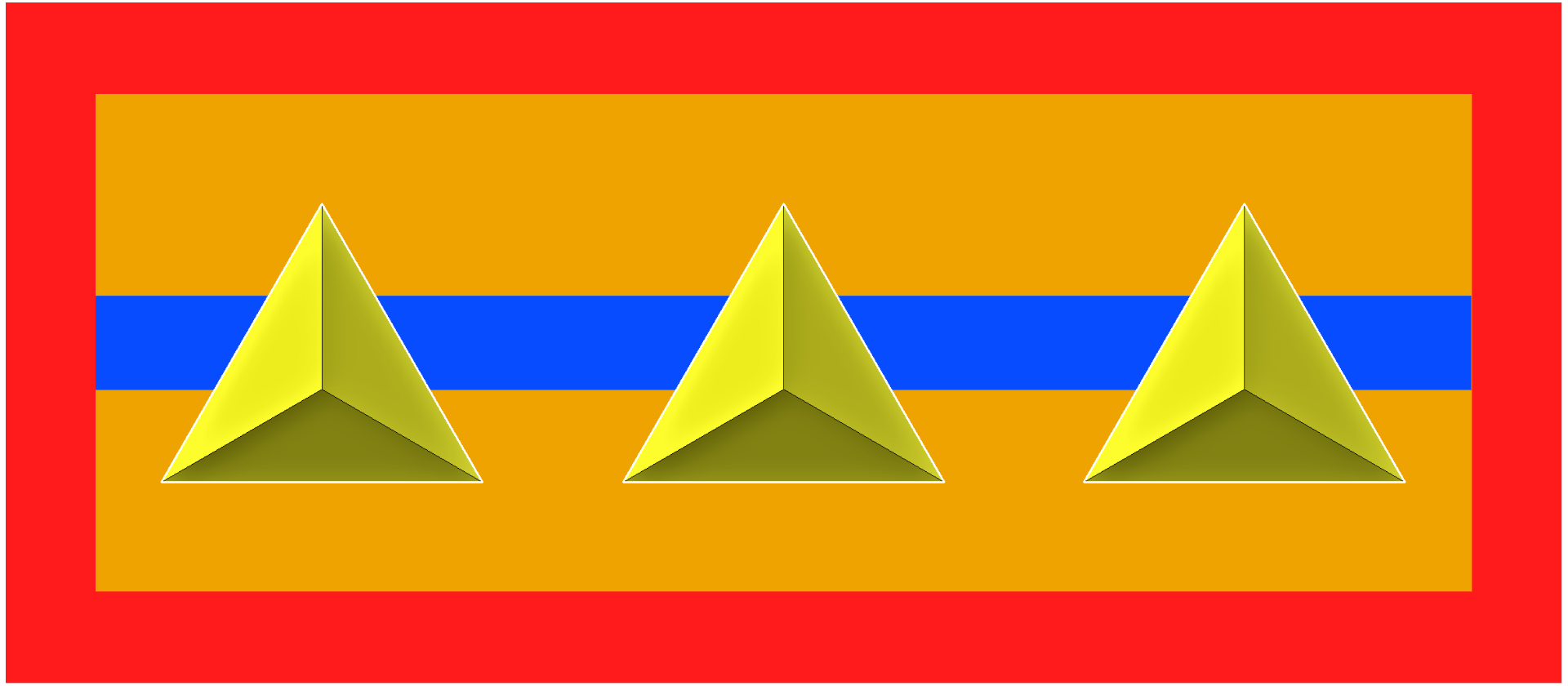
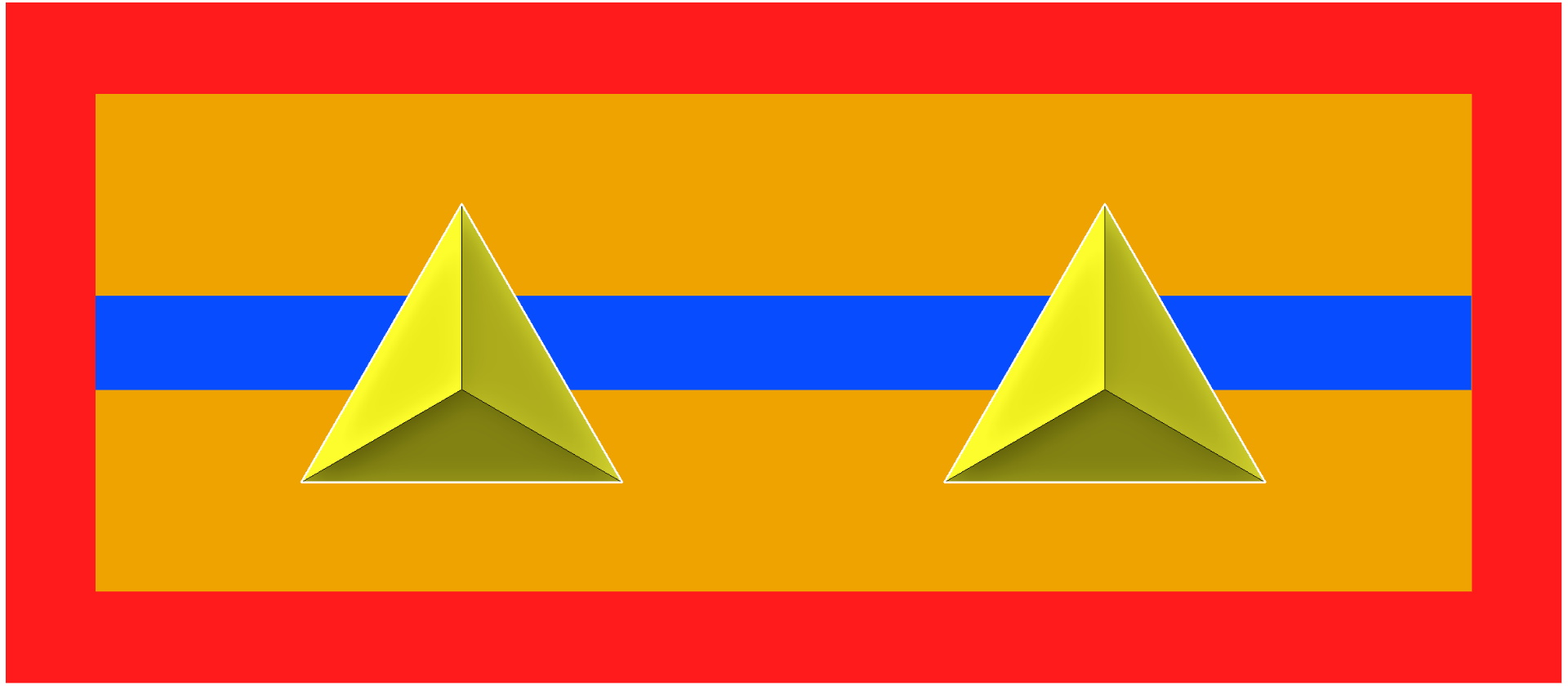
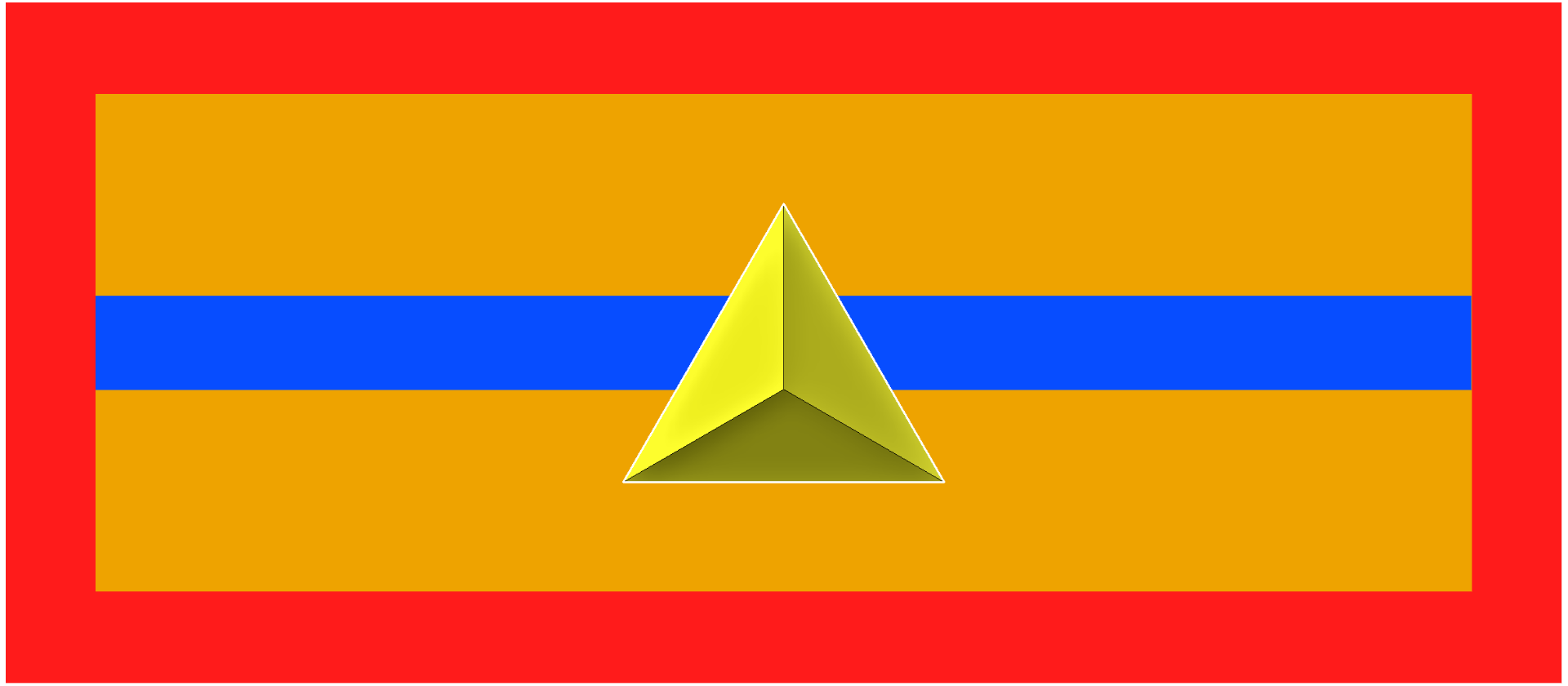
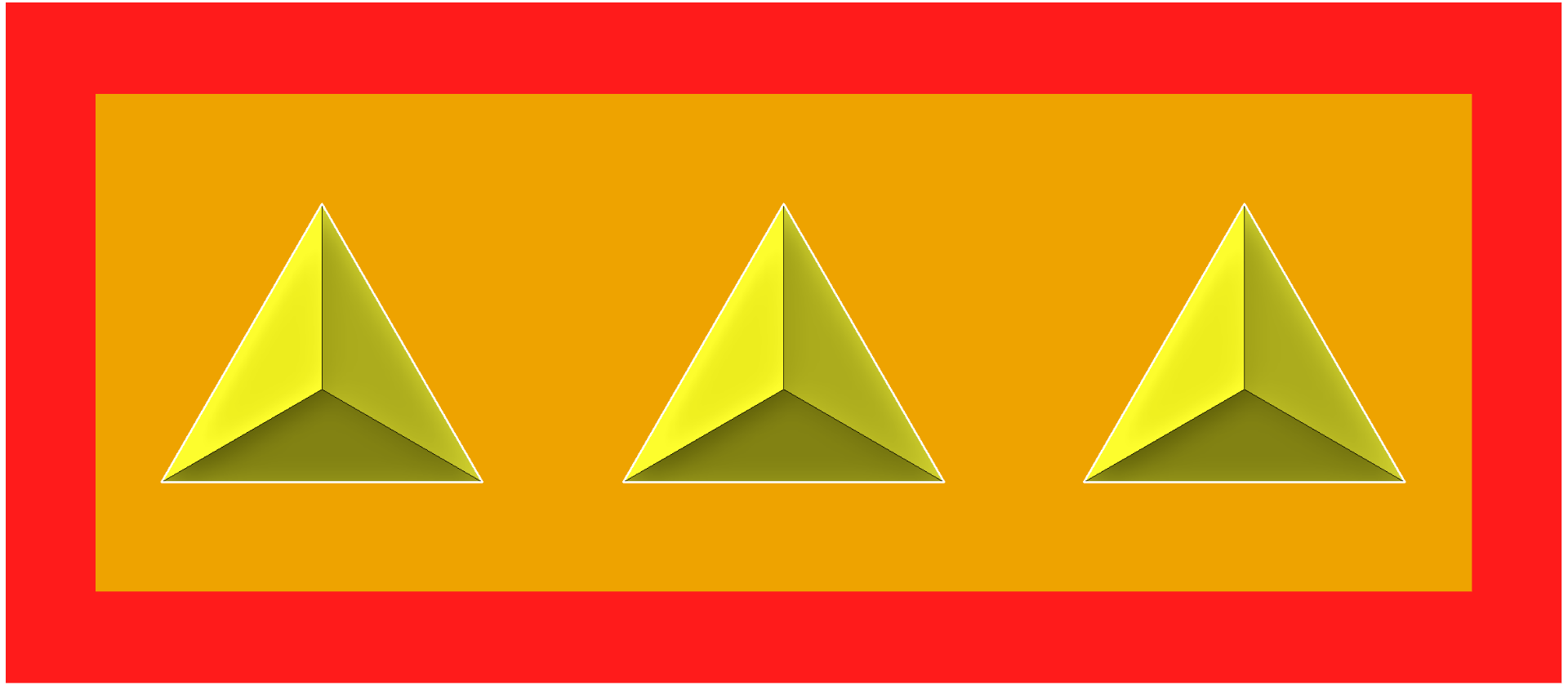
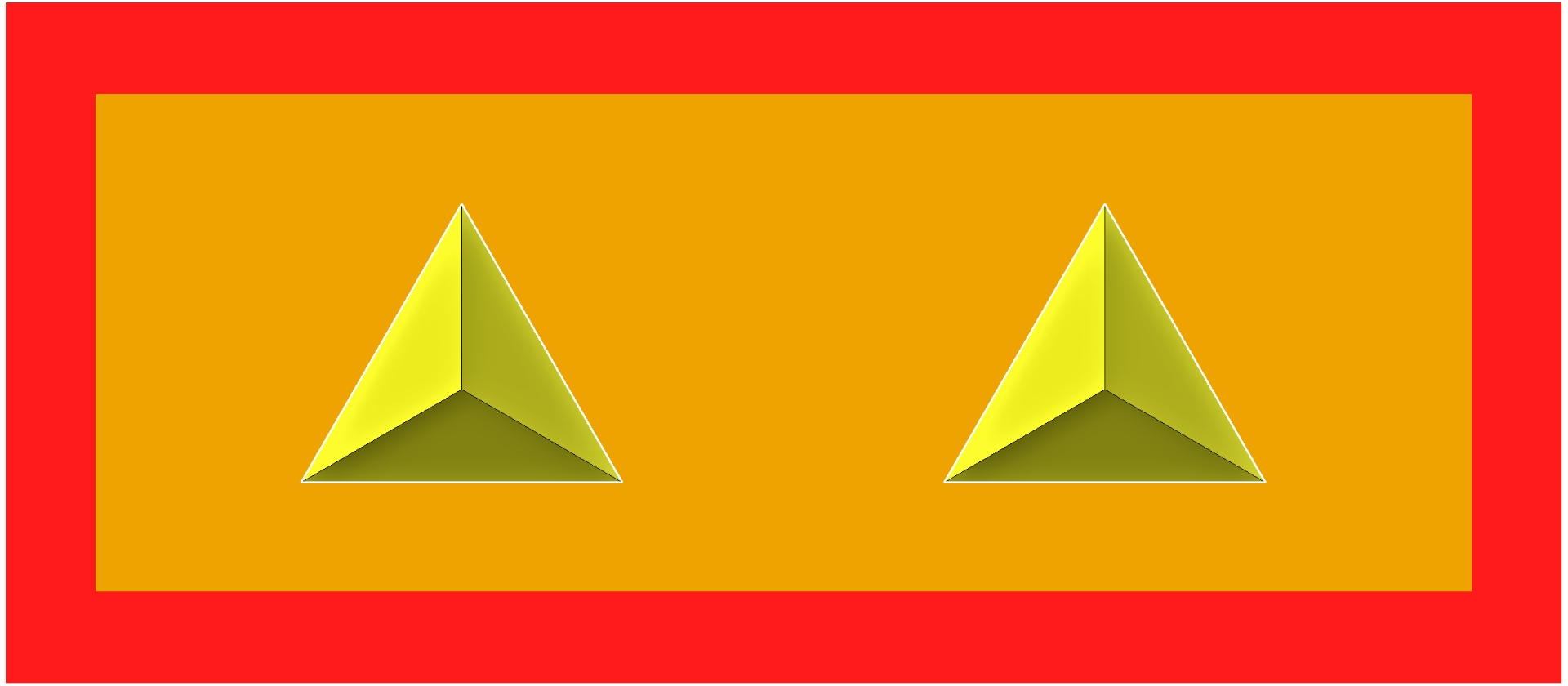
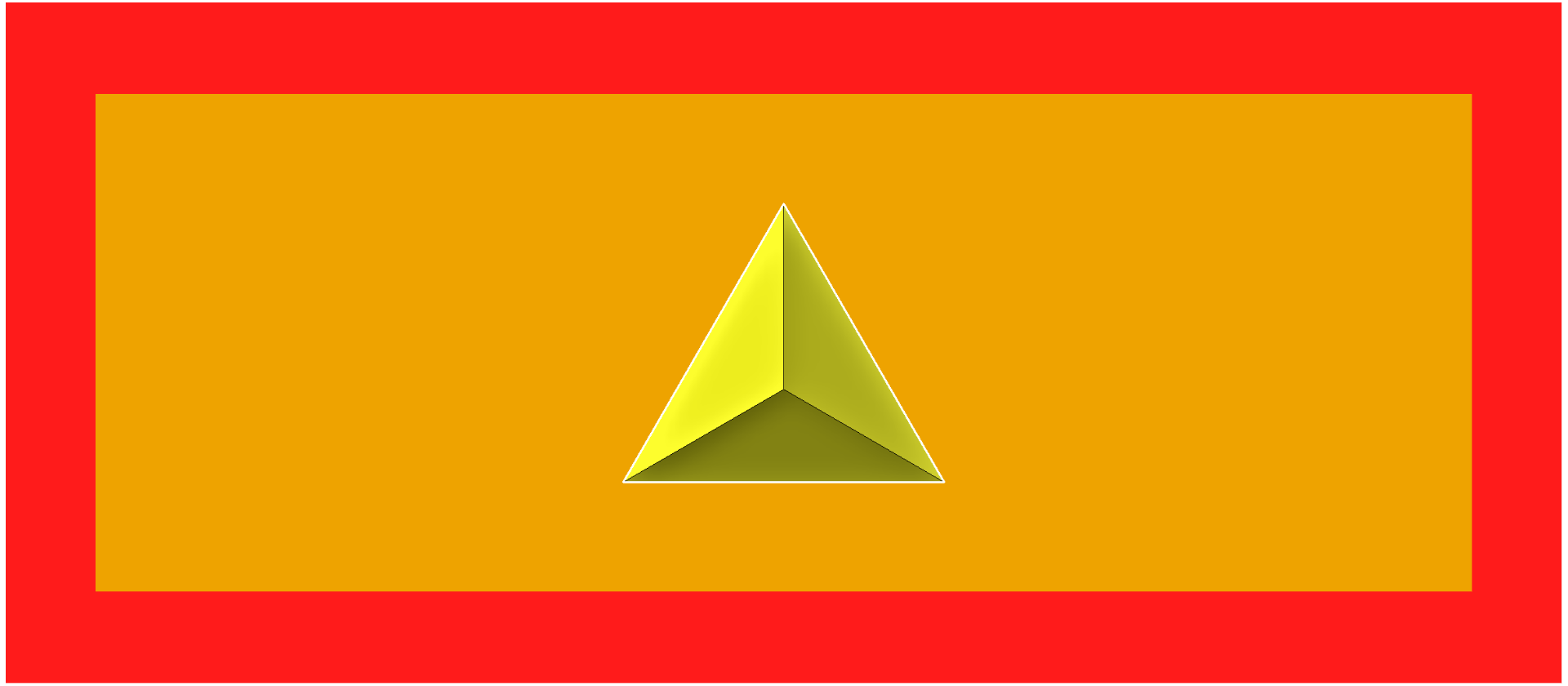
| Rank group | Non-commissioned officers | | | Enlisted |
|---|---|---|---|---|---|---|
| 1912–1928 |
| 1929–1930 |
| 1930–1947 |
| 1947–1949 |
| | 上士; Shàngshì | 中士; Zhōngshì | 下士; Xiàshì | 上等兵; Shàngděng bīng | 一等兵; Yīděng bīng | 二等兵; Èrděng bīng |
| Rank group | Non-commissioned officers | | | Enlisted |

== Navy ranks ==
=== Commissioned officer ranks ===
The rank insignia of commissioned officers.

| Rank group | General / flag officers | | | | | Senior officers | | | Junior officers |
|---|---|---|---|---|---|---|---|---|---|---|---|
| 1912–1928 |
| 1912–1928 | | 一等一级; Yīděng yījí | 一等二级; Yīděng èrjí | 一等三级; Yīděng sānjí | | 二等一级; Èrděng yījí | 二等二级; Èīděng èrjí | 二等三级; Èīděng sānjí | 三等一级; Sānděng yījí | 三等二级; Sānděng èrjí | 三等三级; Sānděng sānjí |
| 1928–1946 |
| 1928–1946 | 一級上將; Yījí shàngjiàng | 二級上將; Èrjí shàngjiàng | 中將; Zhōngjiàng | 少將; Shàojiàng | 代將; Dàijiàng | 上校; Shàngxiào | 中校; Zhōngxiào | 少校; Shàoxiào | 上尉; Shàngwèi | 中尉; Zhōngwèi | 少尉; Shàowèi |
| 1946–1949 |
| 1946–1949 | 一級上將; Yījí shàngjiàng | 二級上將; Èrjí shàngjiàng | 中將; Zhōngjiàng | 少將; Shàojiàng | 代將; Dàijiàng | 上校; Shàngxiào | 中校; Zhōngxiào | 少校; Shàoxiào | 上尉; Shàngwèi | 中尉; Zhōngwèi | 少尉; Shàowèi |
| Rank group | General / flag officers | | | | | Senior officers | | | Junior officers |

=== Other ranks ===
The rank insignia of non-commissioned officers and enlisted personnel.

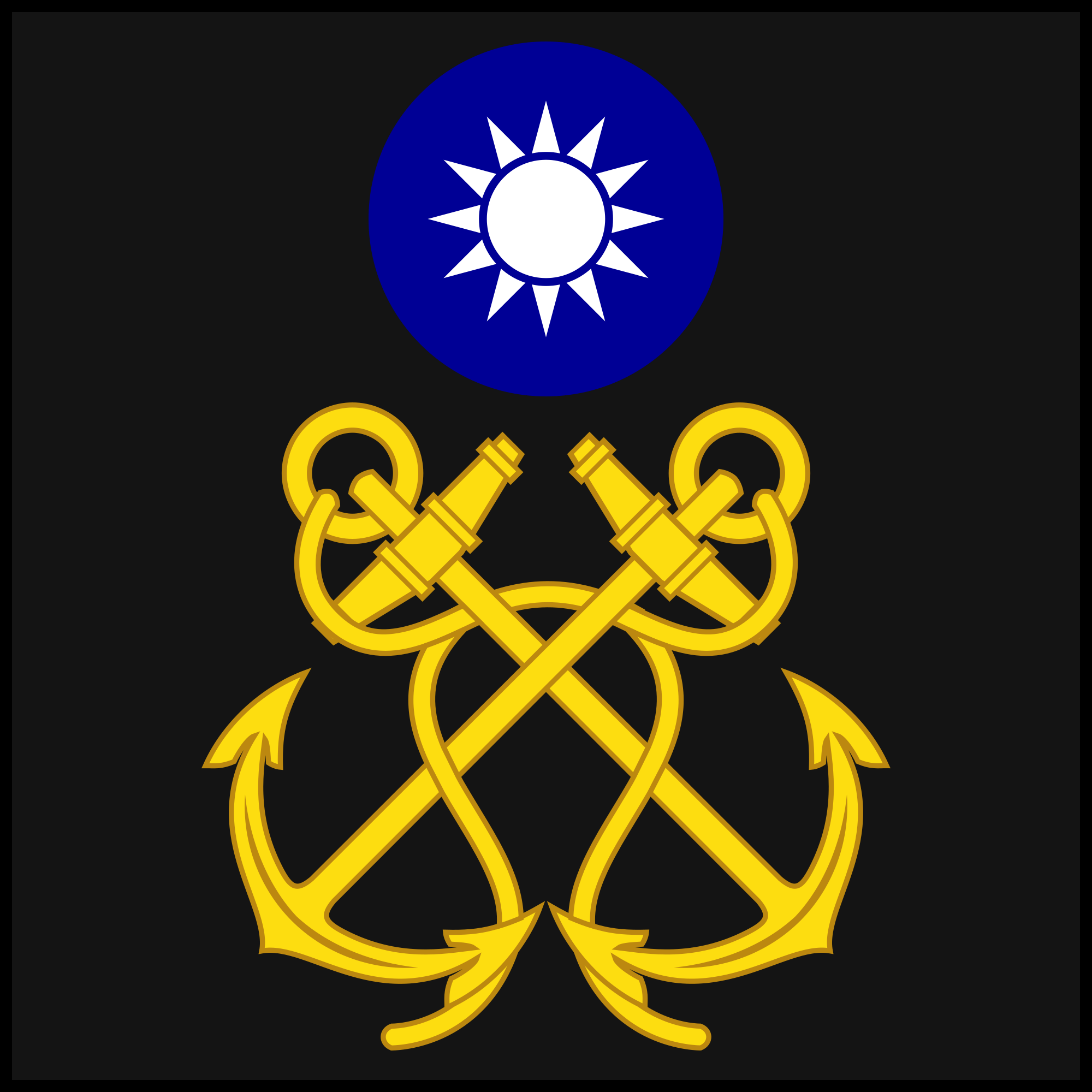
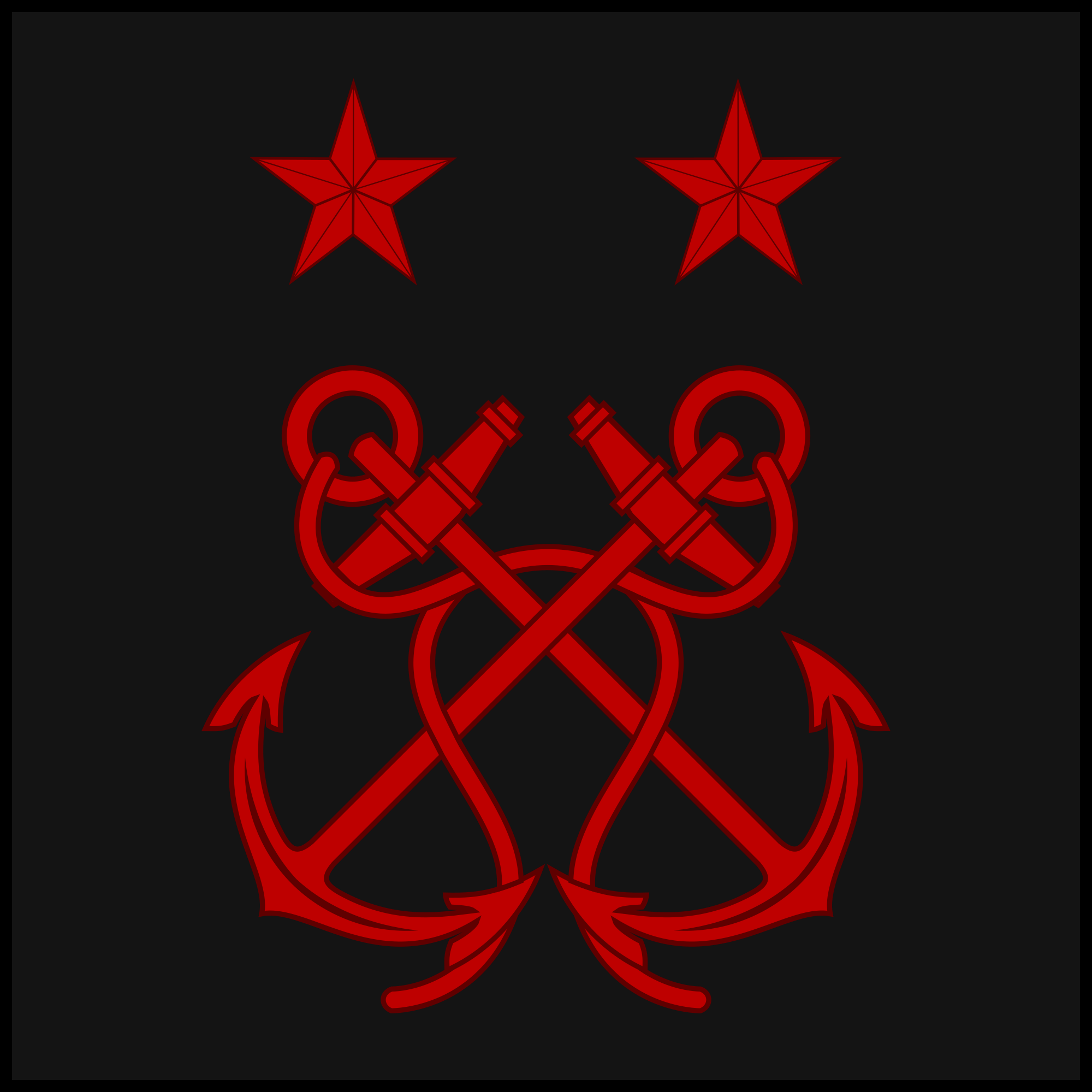
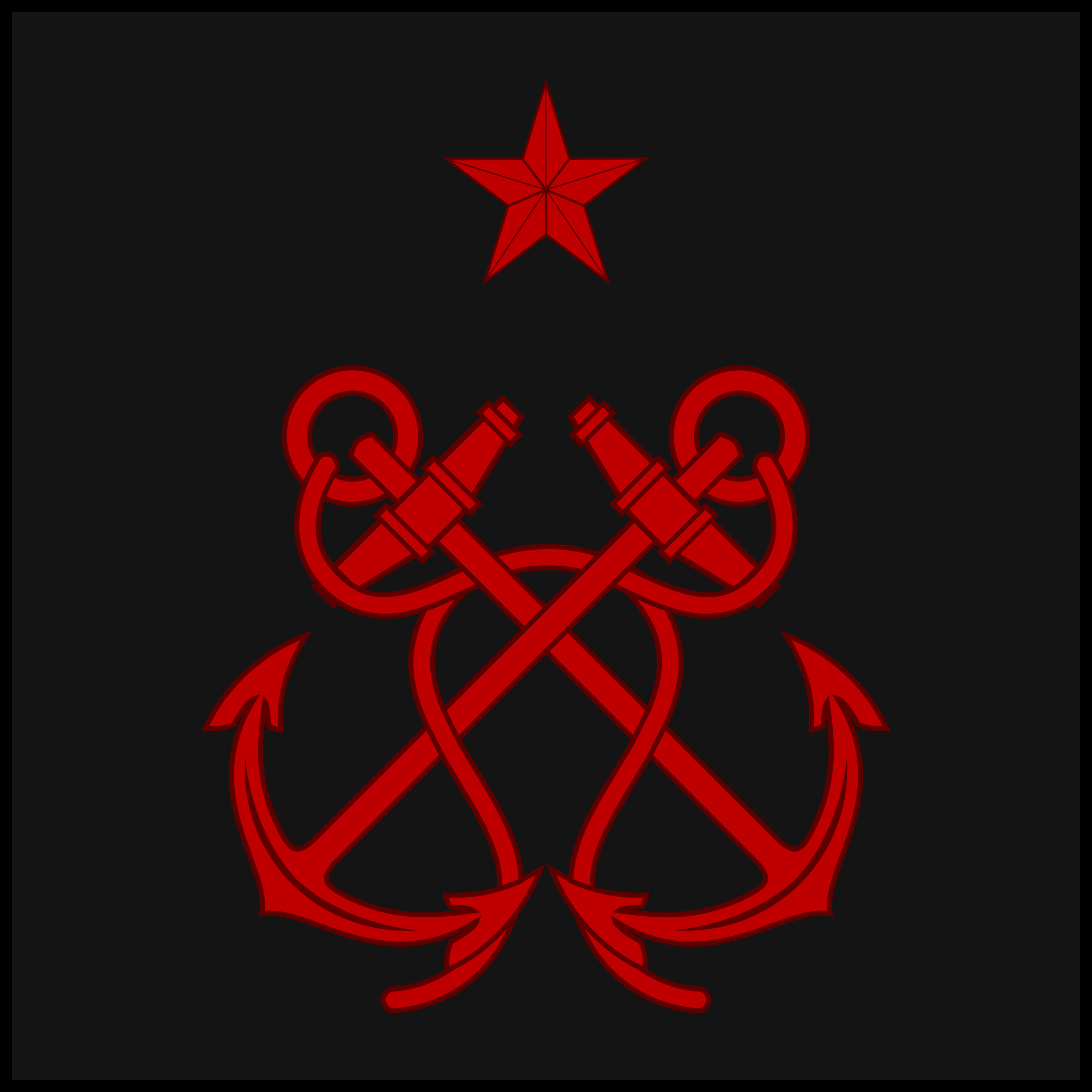
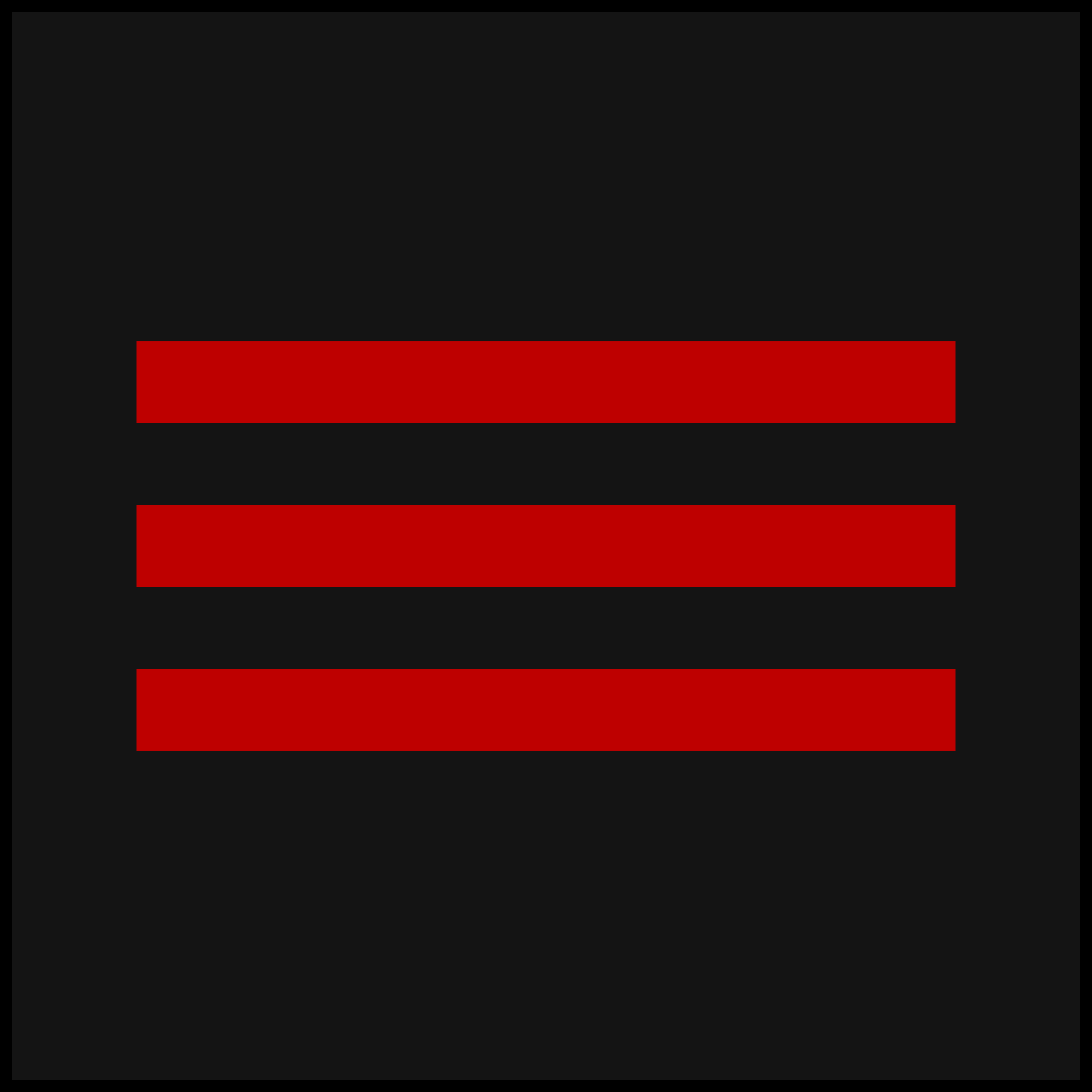
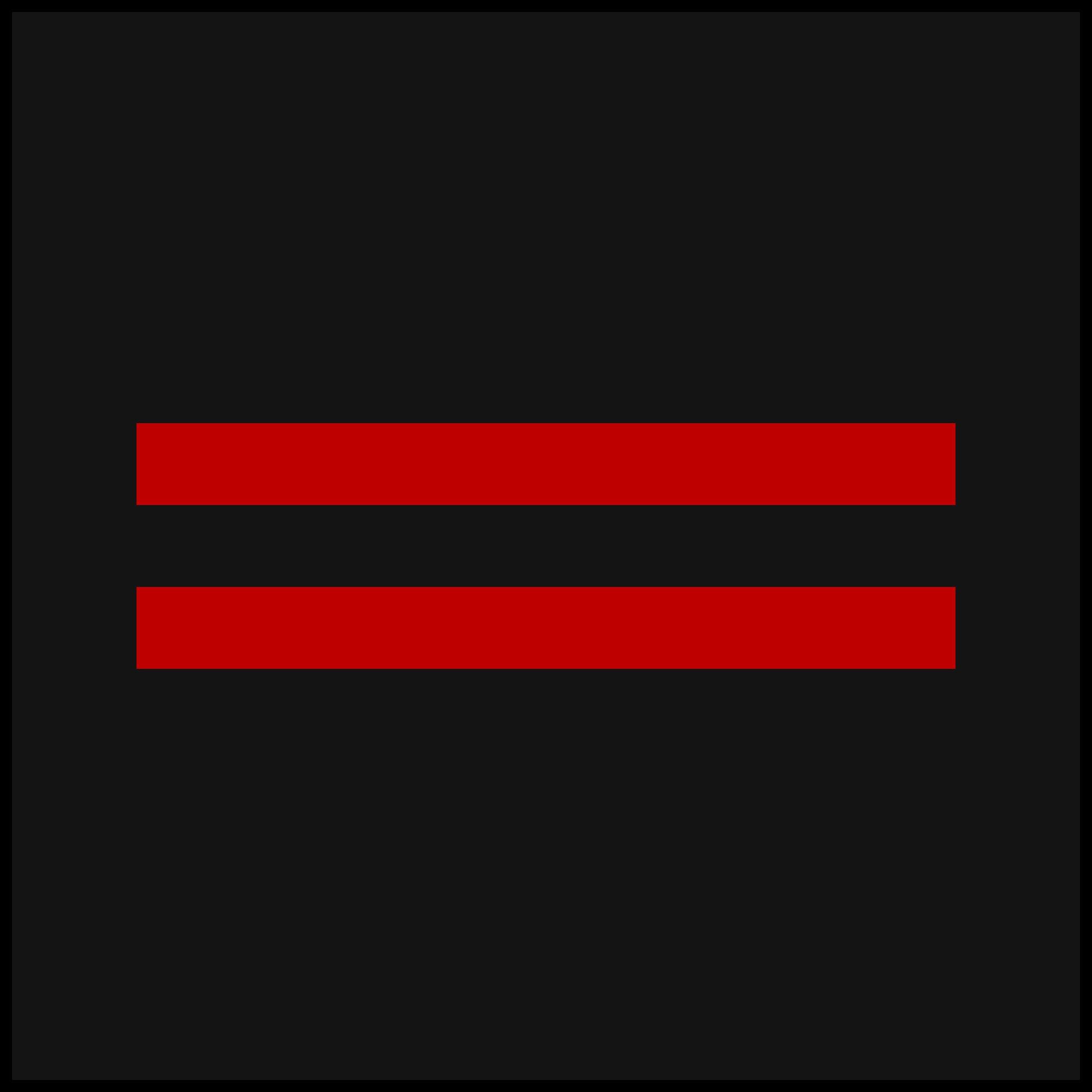
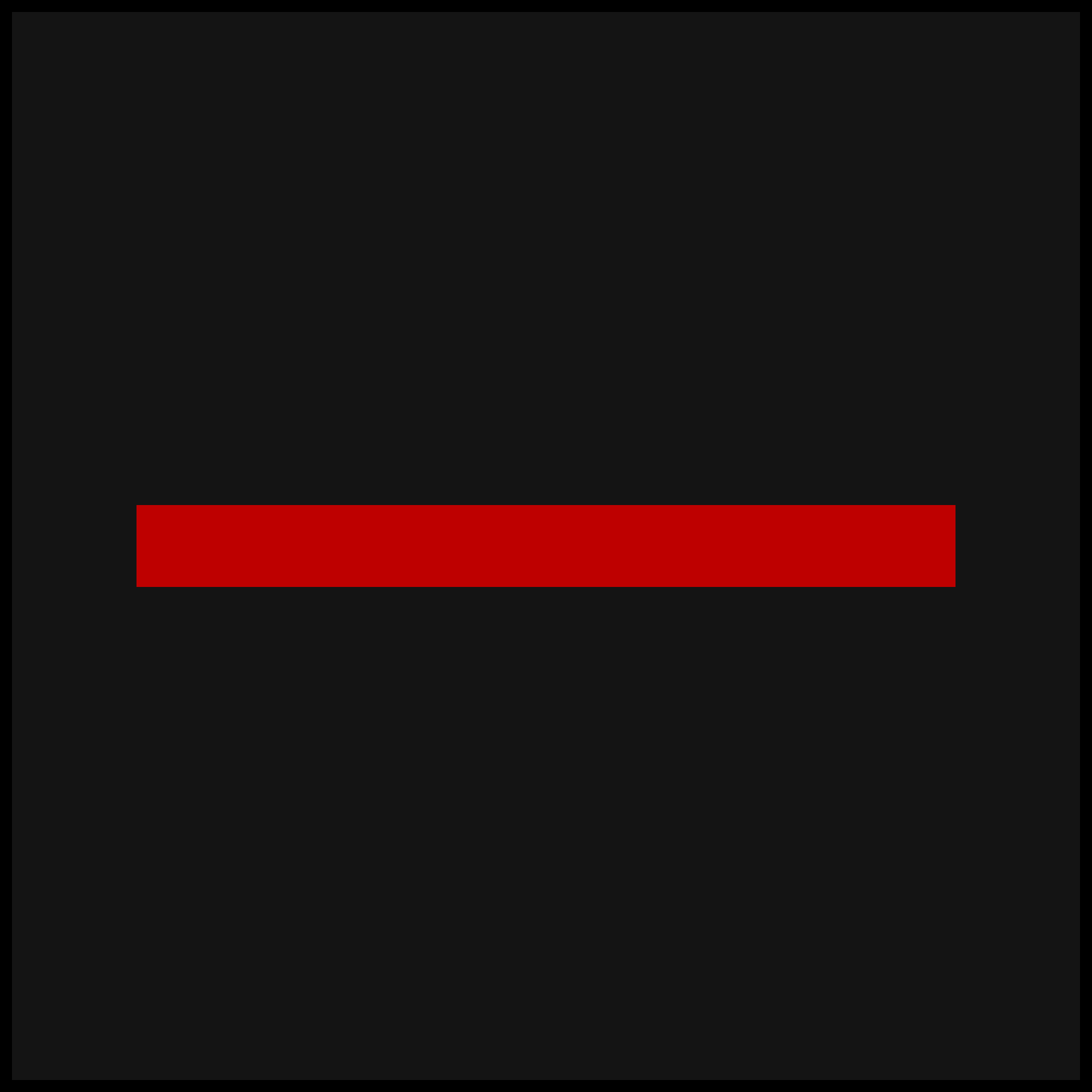
| Rank group | Non-commissioned officers | | | Enlisted |
|---|---|---|---|---|---|---|---|---|
| 1912–1928 |
| 1921–1949 |
| 1921–1949 | 上士; Shàngshì | 中士; Zhōngshì | 下士; Xiàshì | 一等兵; Yīděng bīng | 二等兵; Èrděng bīng | 三等兵; Sānděng bīng | 一等練兵; Yīděng liànbīng | 二等練兵; Èrděng liànbīng |
| Rank group | Non-commissioned officers | | | Enlisted |

== Air force ranks ==
=== Commissioned officer ranks ===
The rank insignia of commissioned officers.

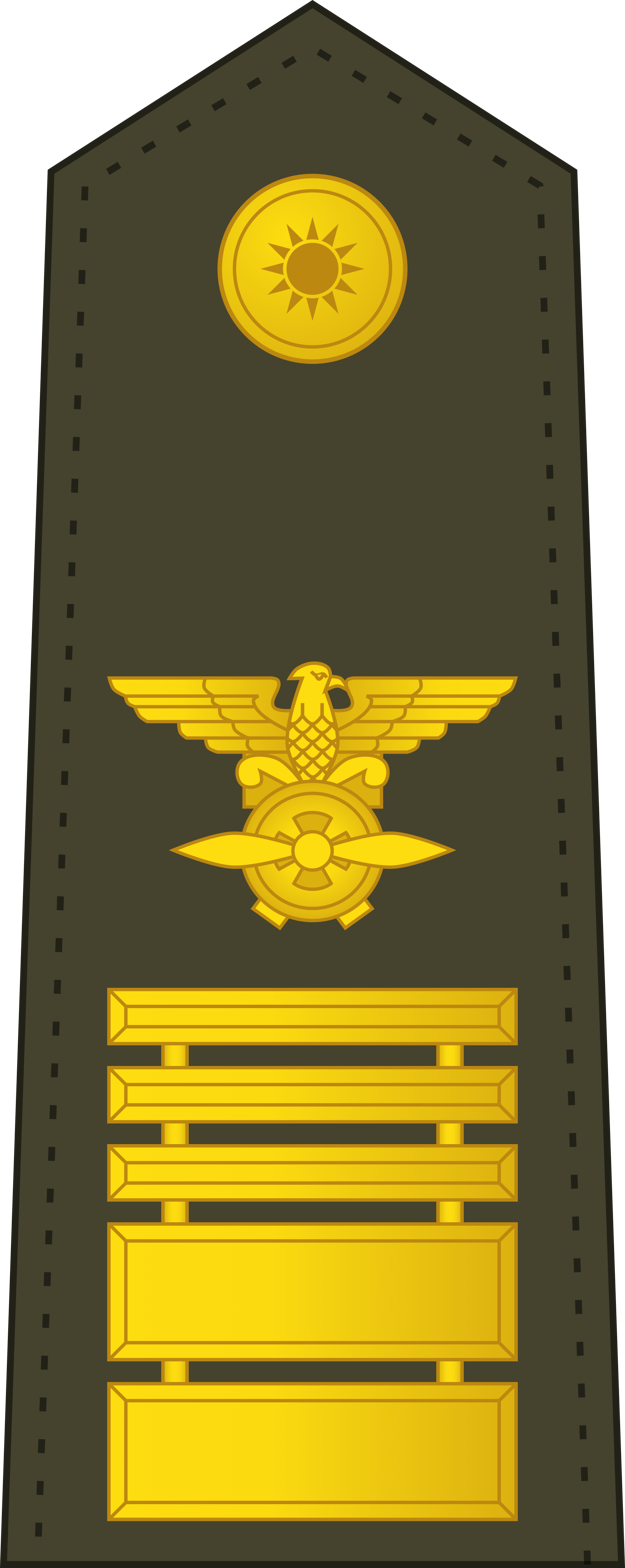
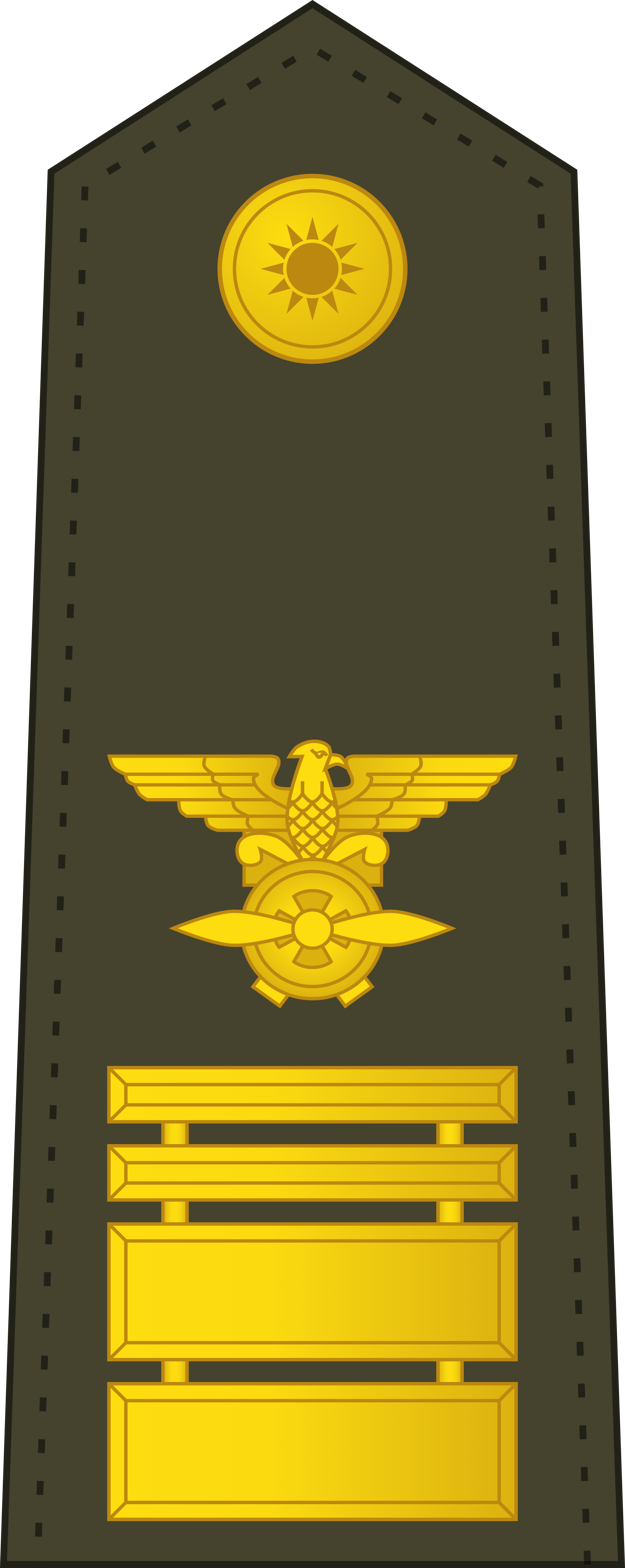
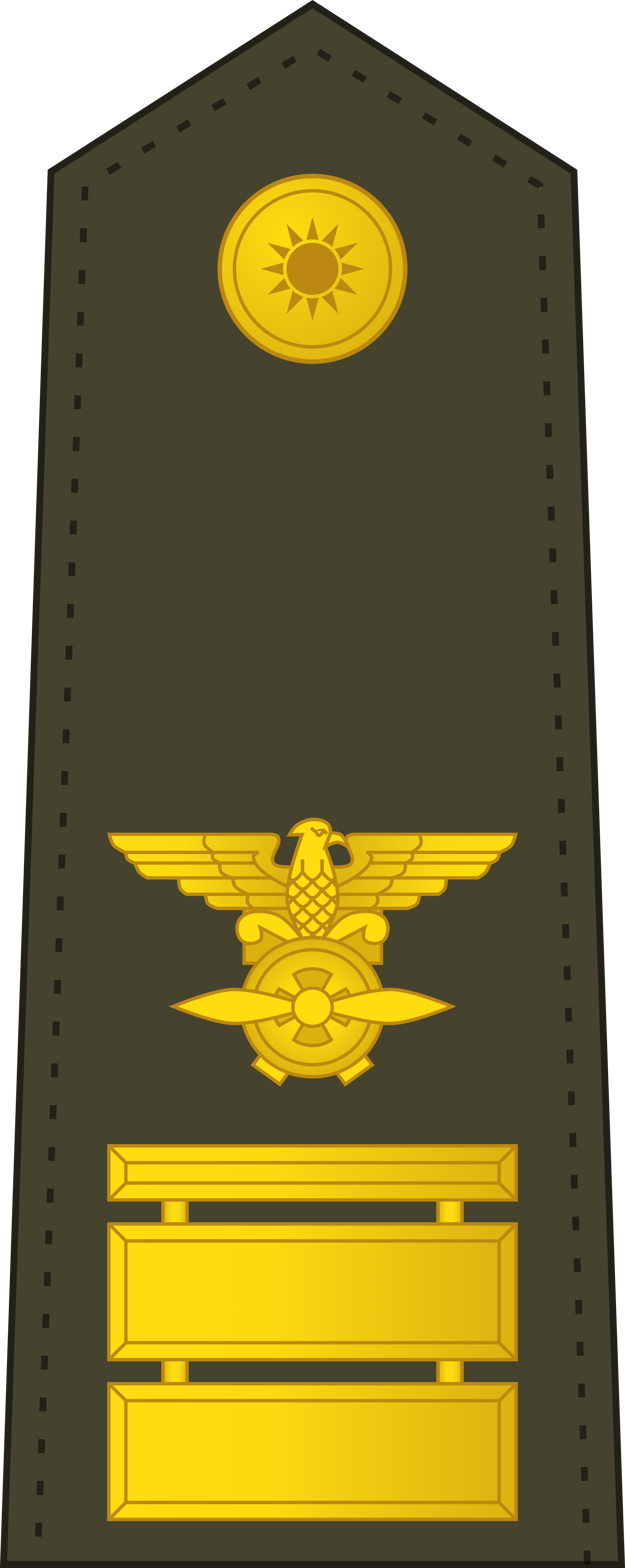
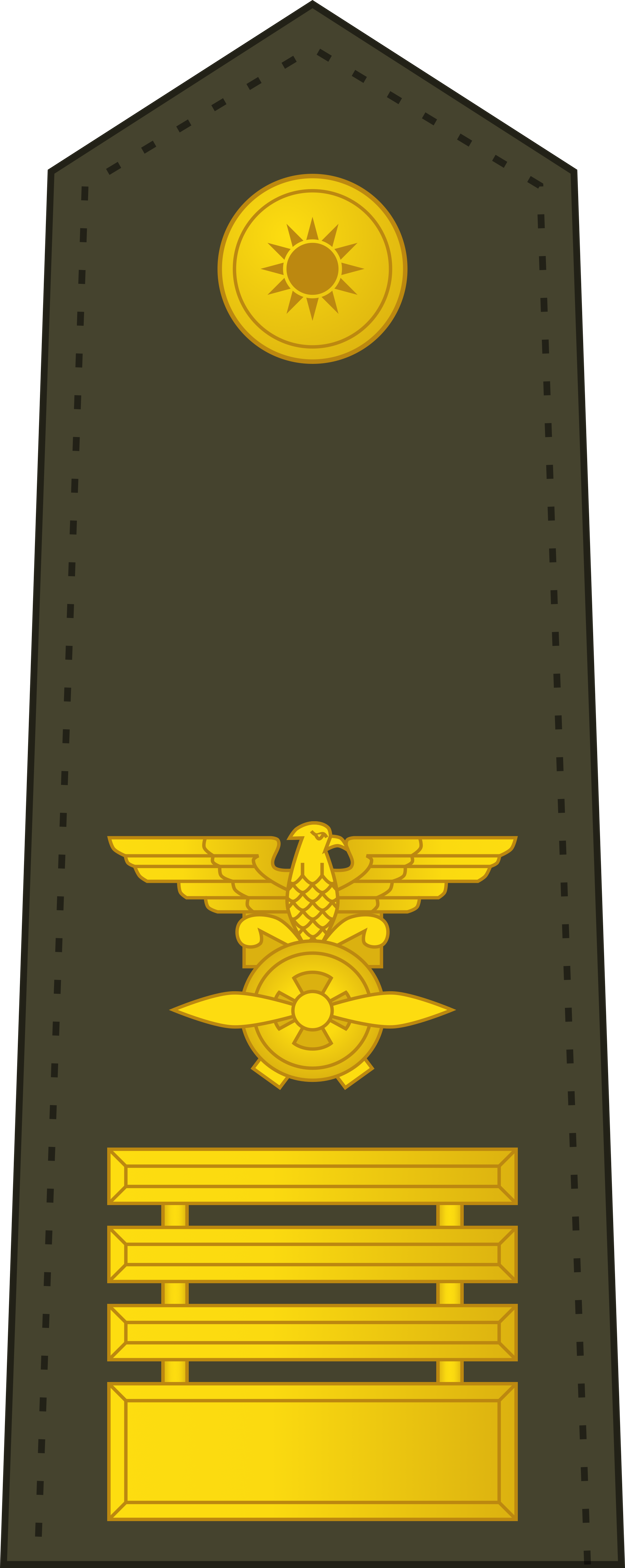
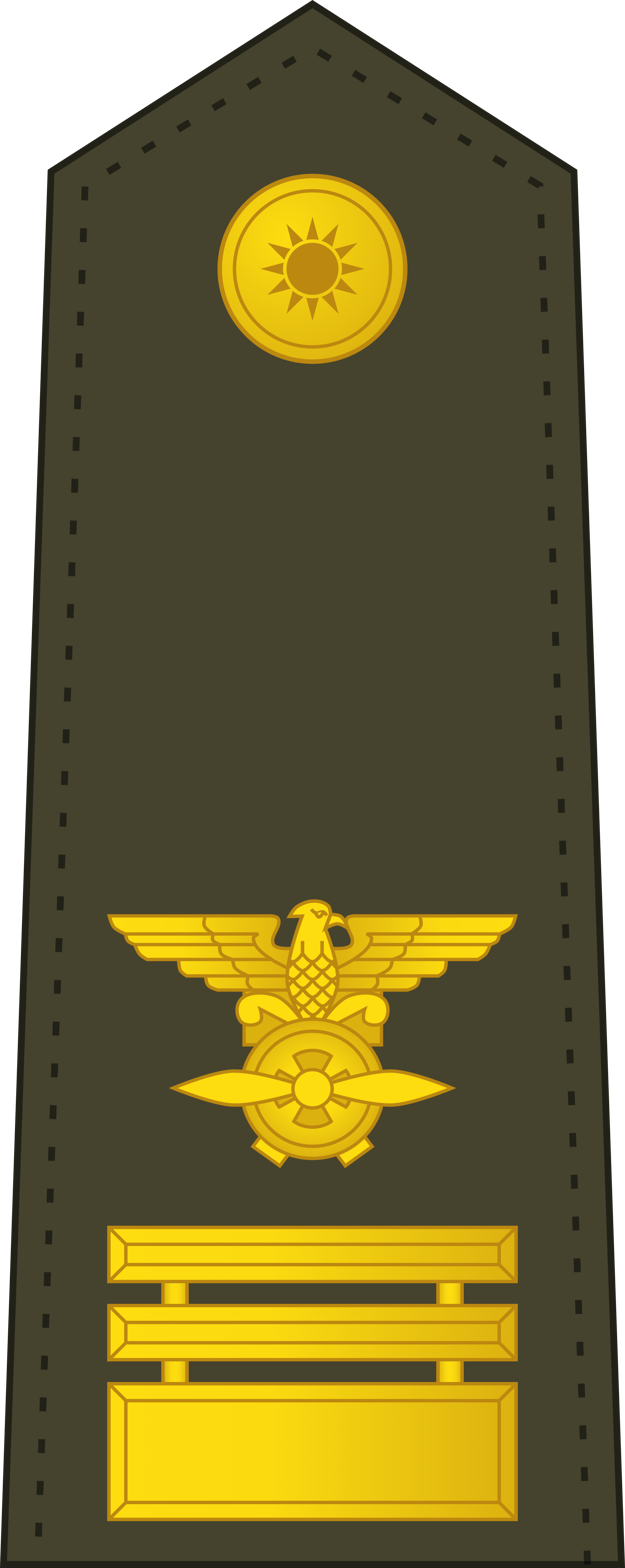
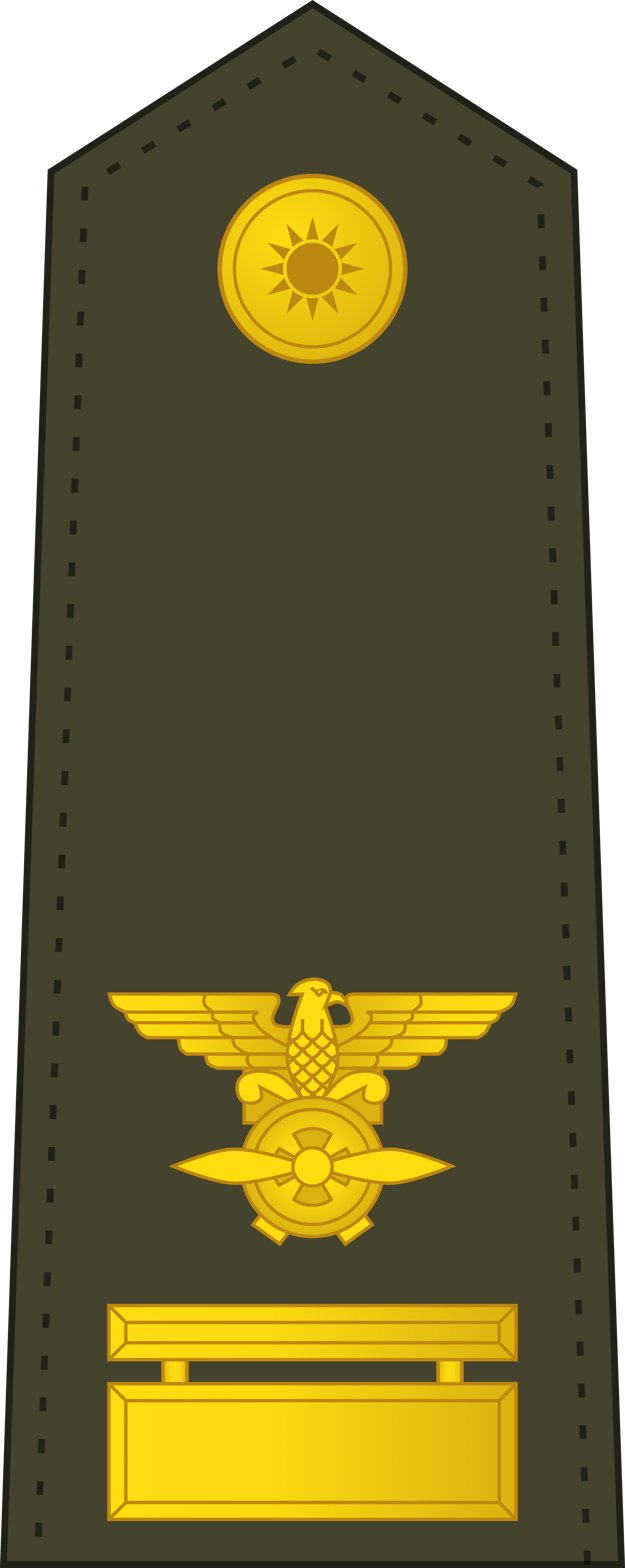
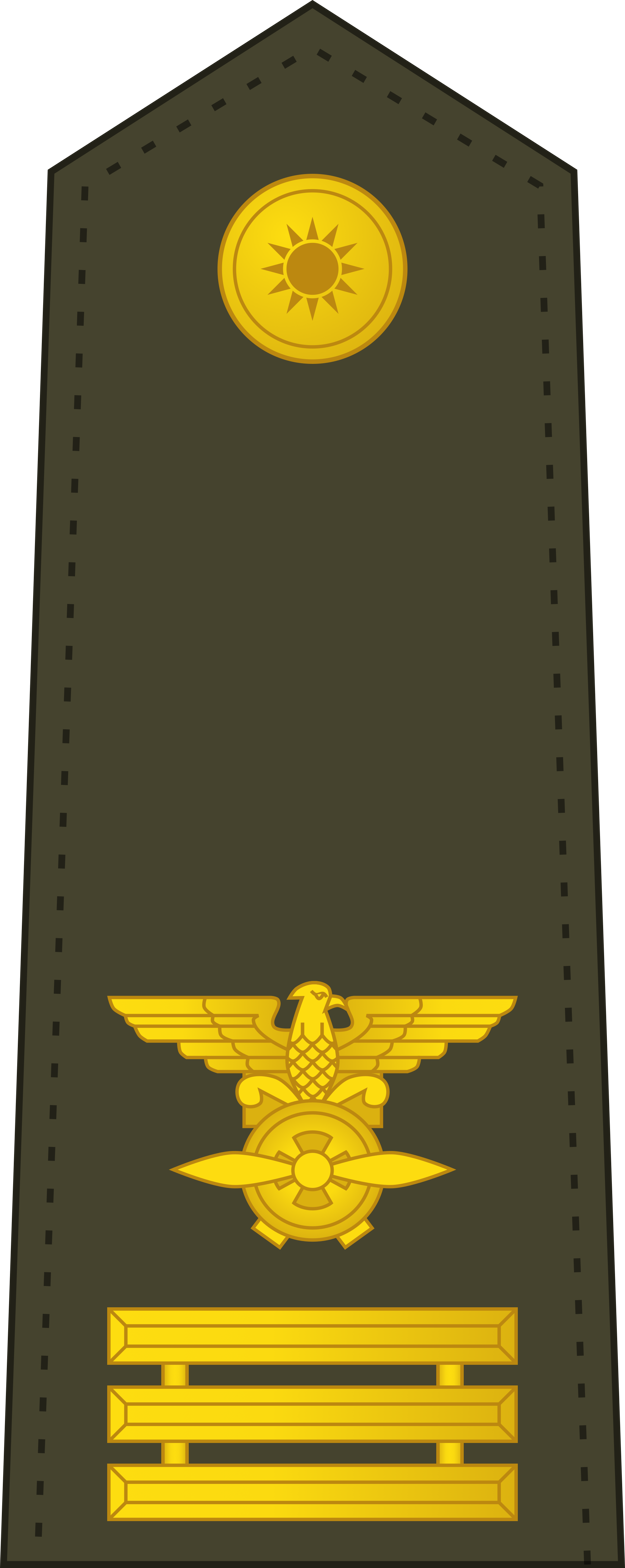
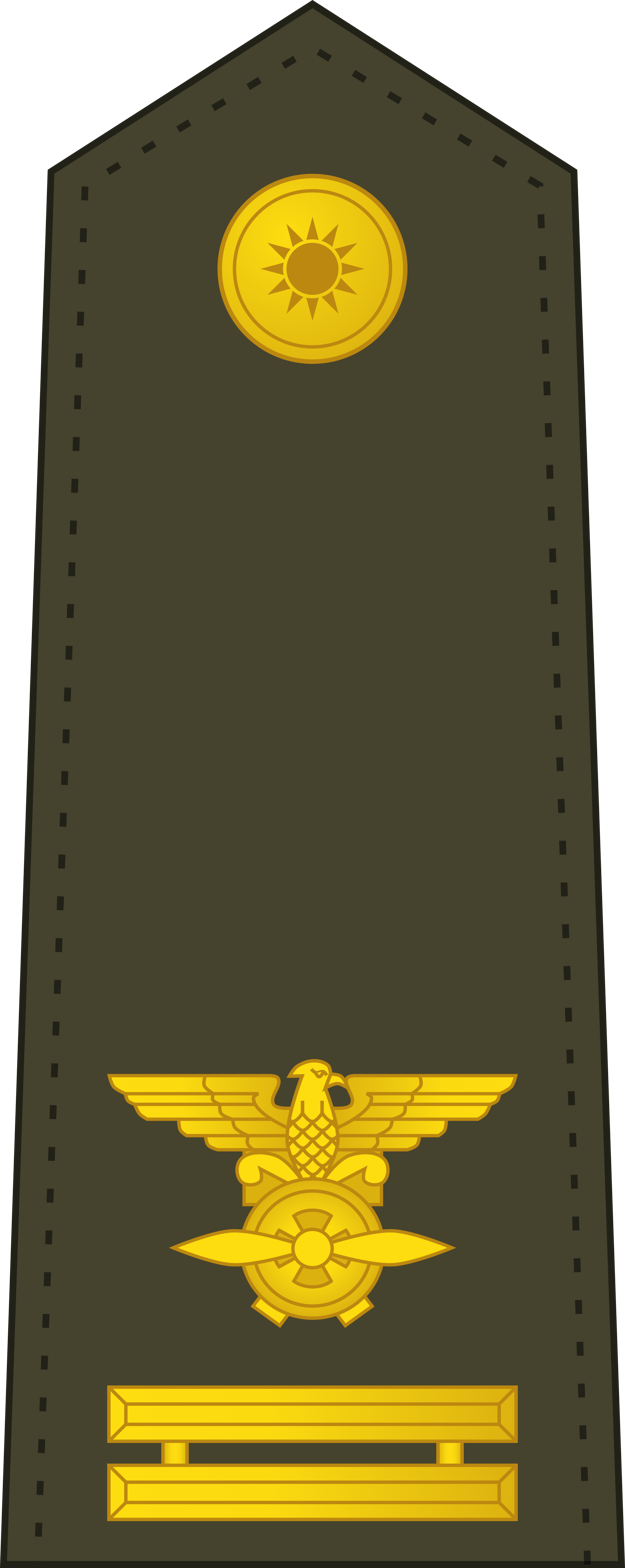
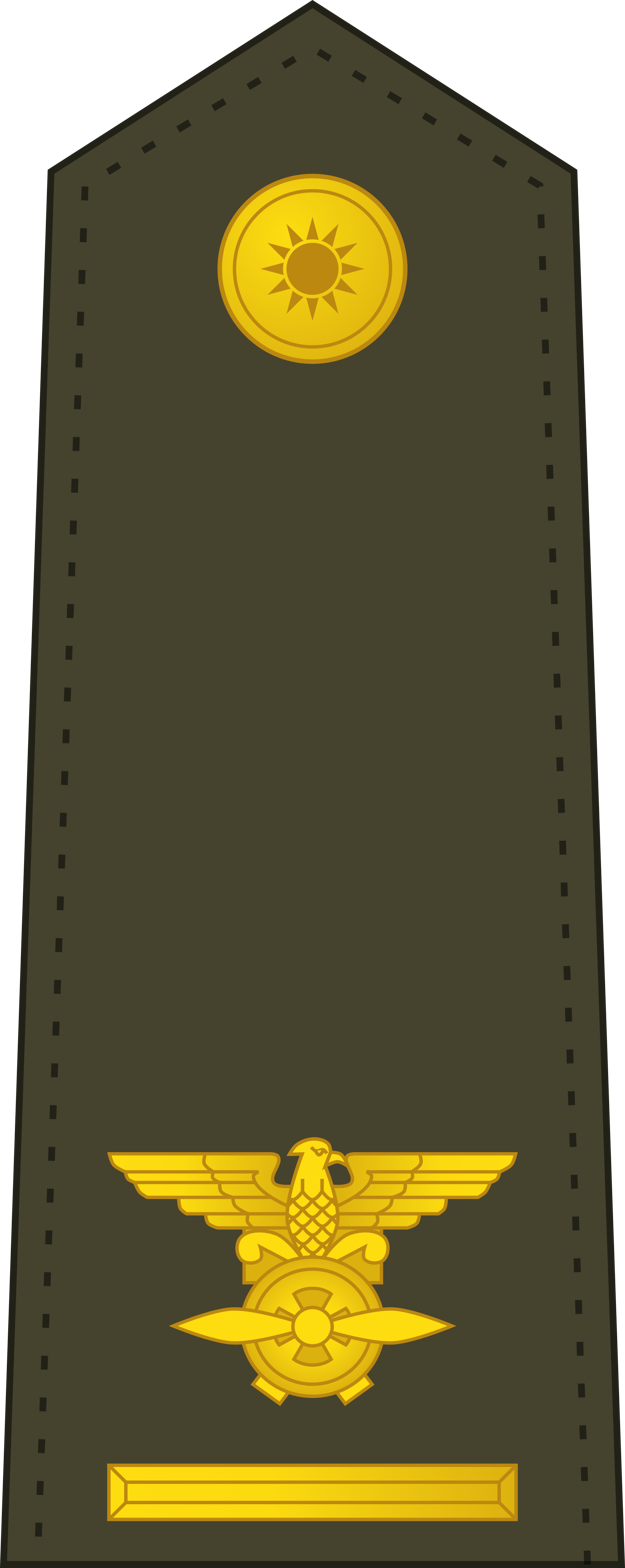
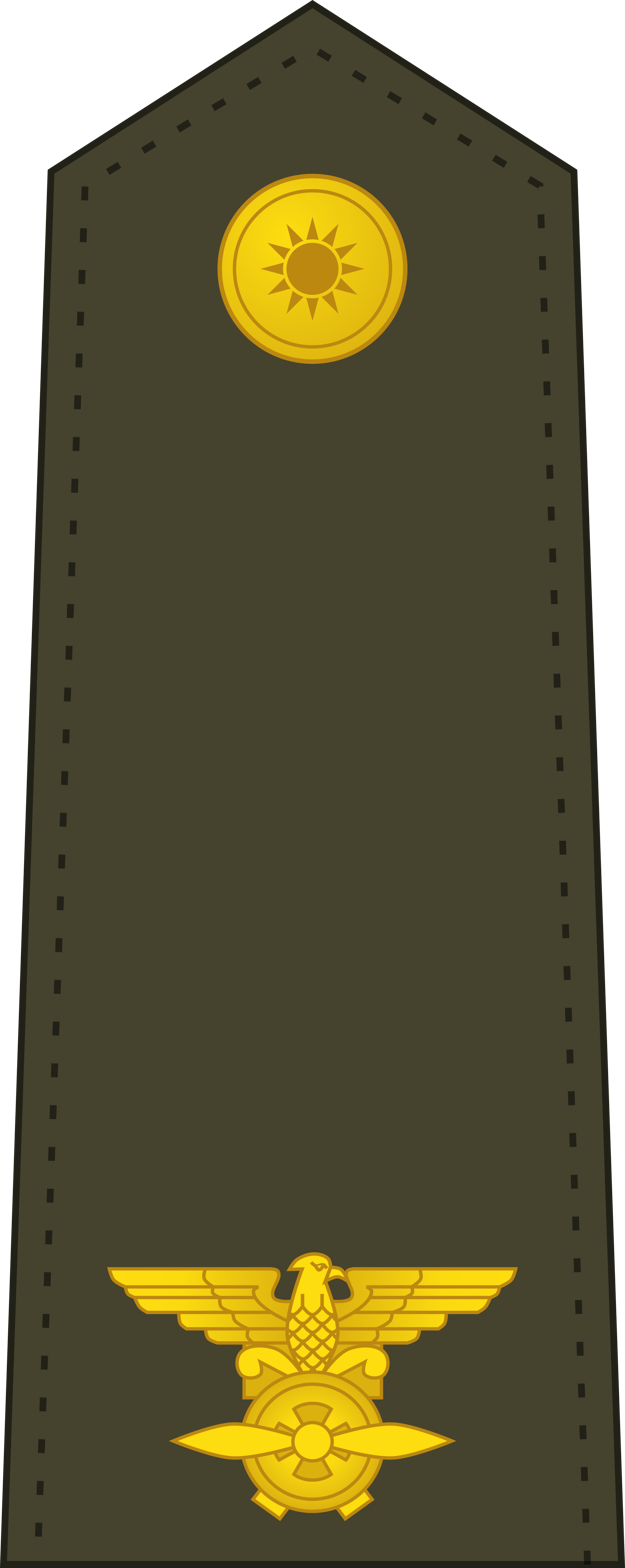
| Rank group | General / flag officers | | | Senior officers | | | Junior officers |
|---|---|---|---|---|---|---|---|---|---|---|
| Rank | 上將; Shàngjiàng | 中將; Zhōngjiàng | 少將; Shàojiàng | 上校; Shàngxiào | 中校; Zhōngxiào | 少校; Shàoxiào | 上尉; Shàngwèi | 中尉; Zhōngwèi | 少尉; Shàowèi | 准尉; Zhǔnwèi |
| 1936–1939 |
| 1939–1946 |
| 1946–1949 |
| Rank group | General / flag officers | | | Senior officers | | | Junior officers |

=== Other ranks ===
The rank insignia of non-commissioned officers and enlisted personnel.

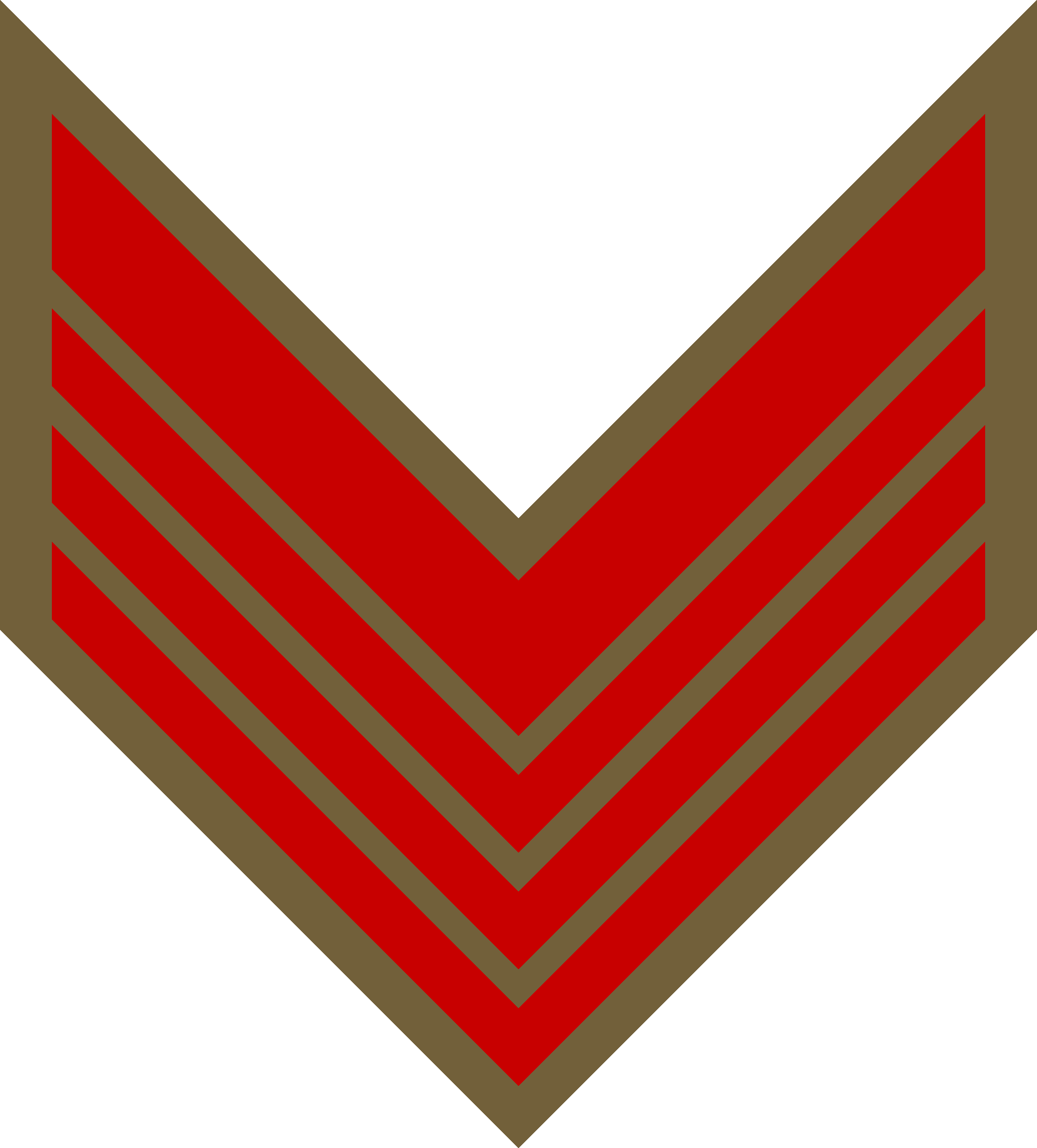
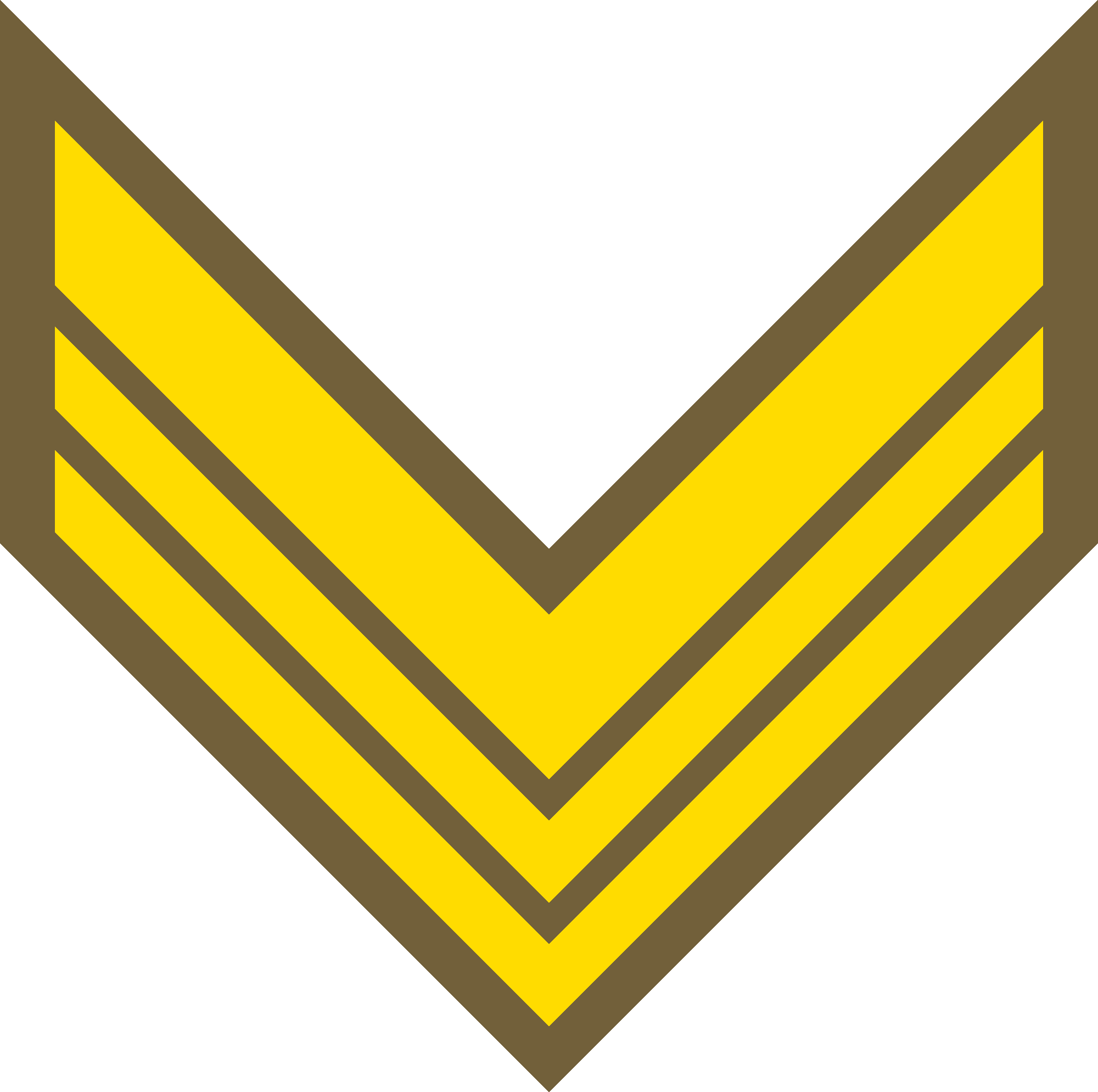
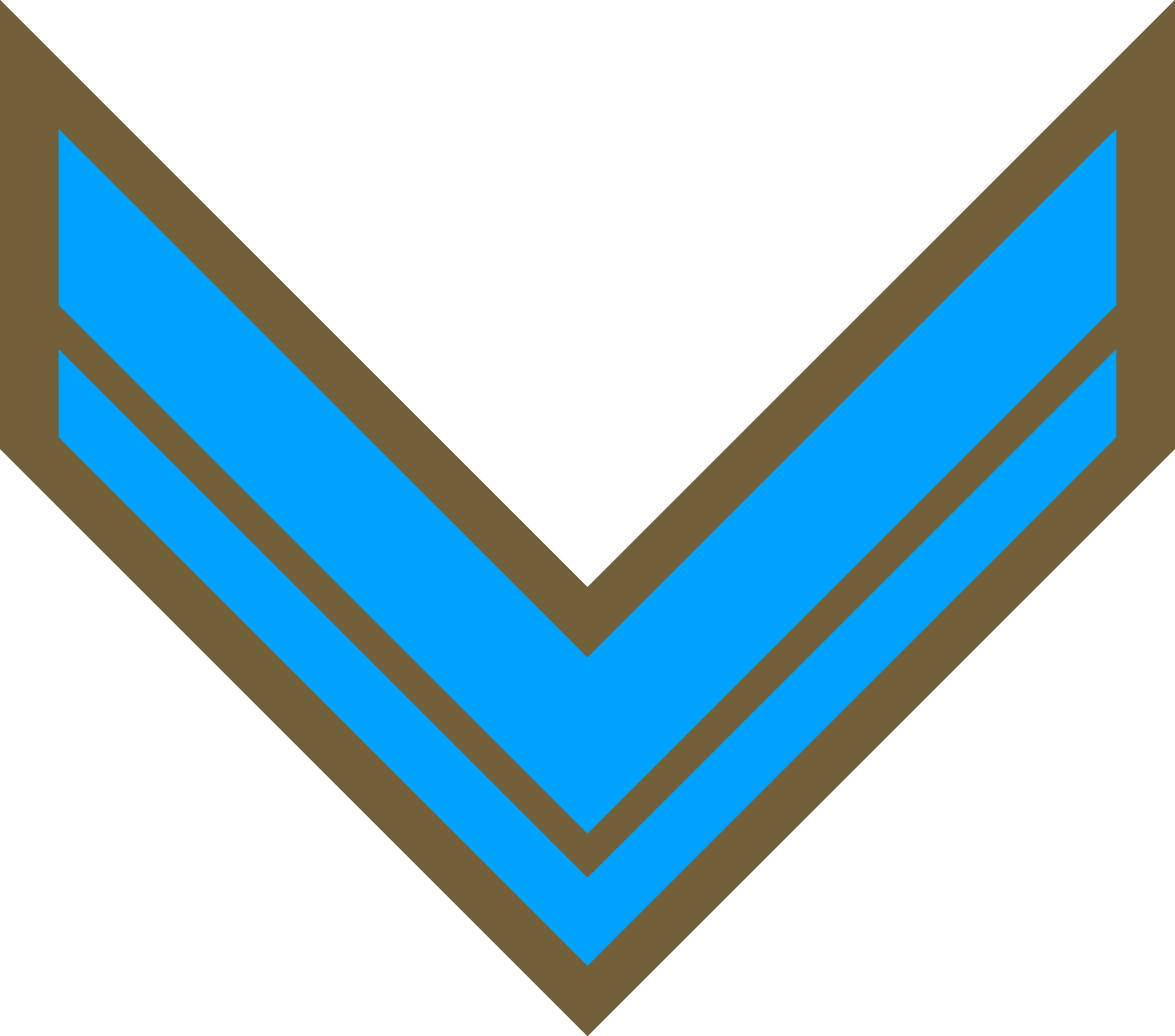
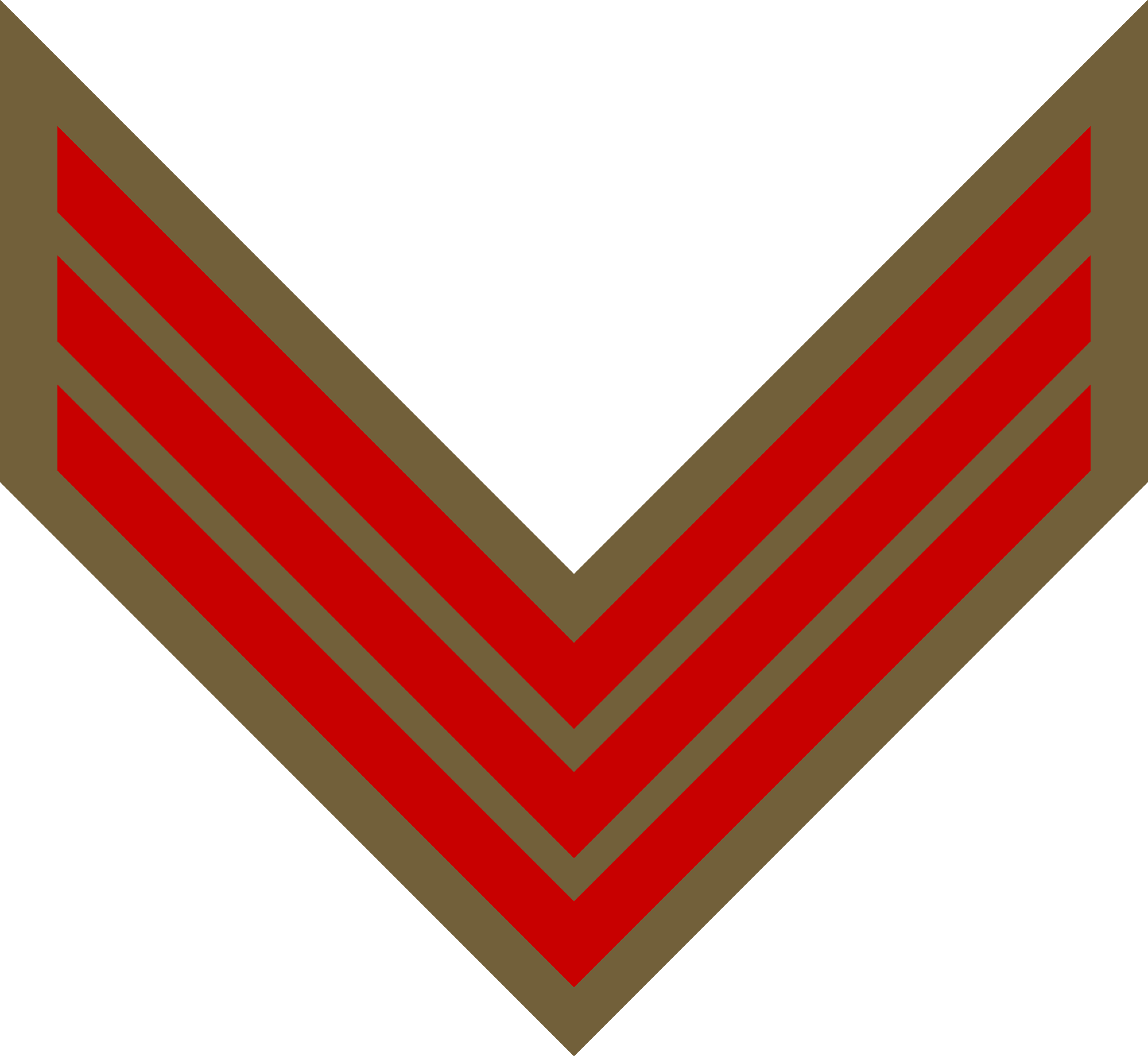
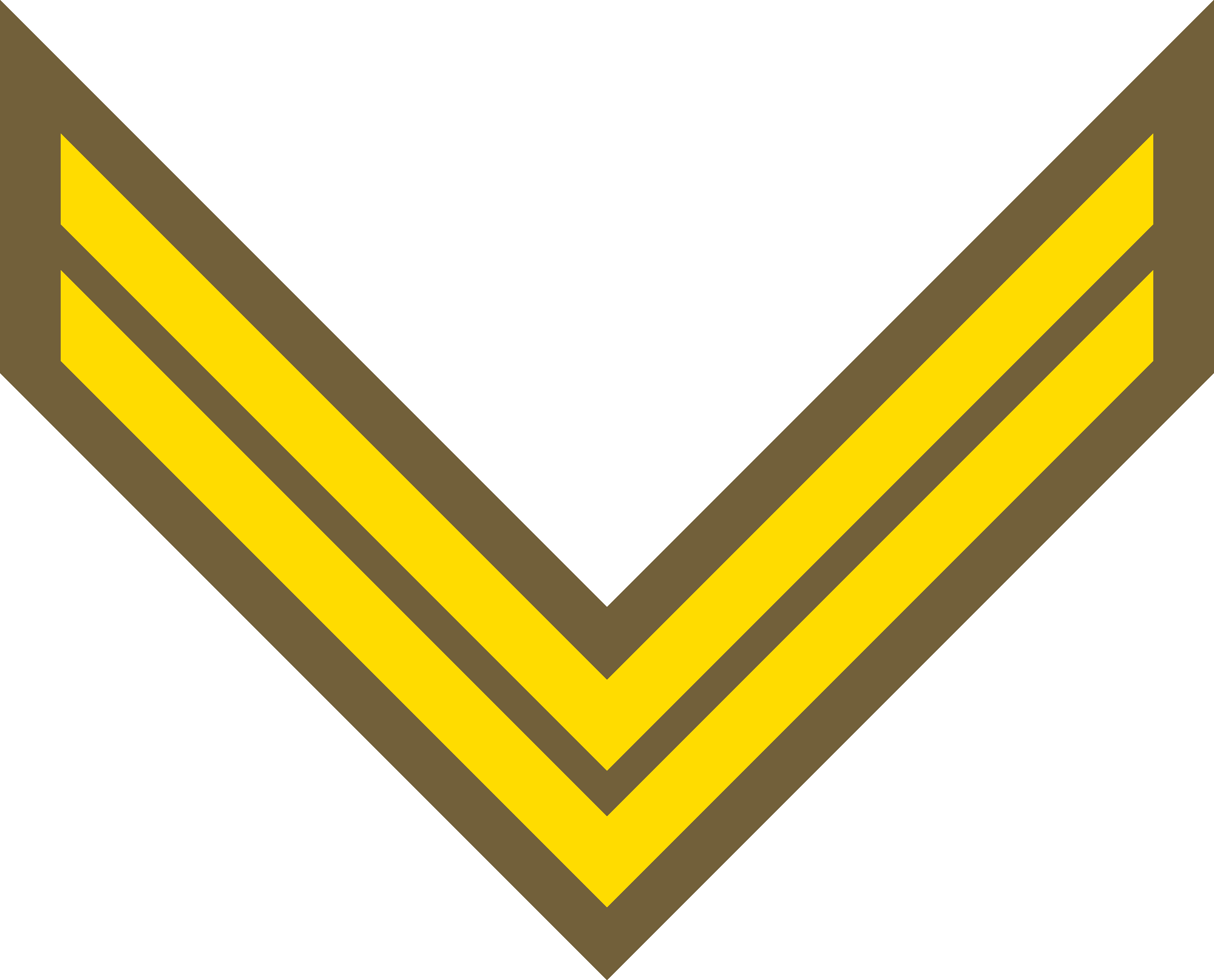
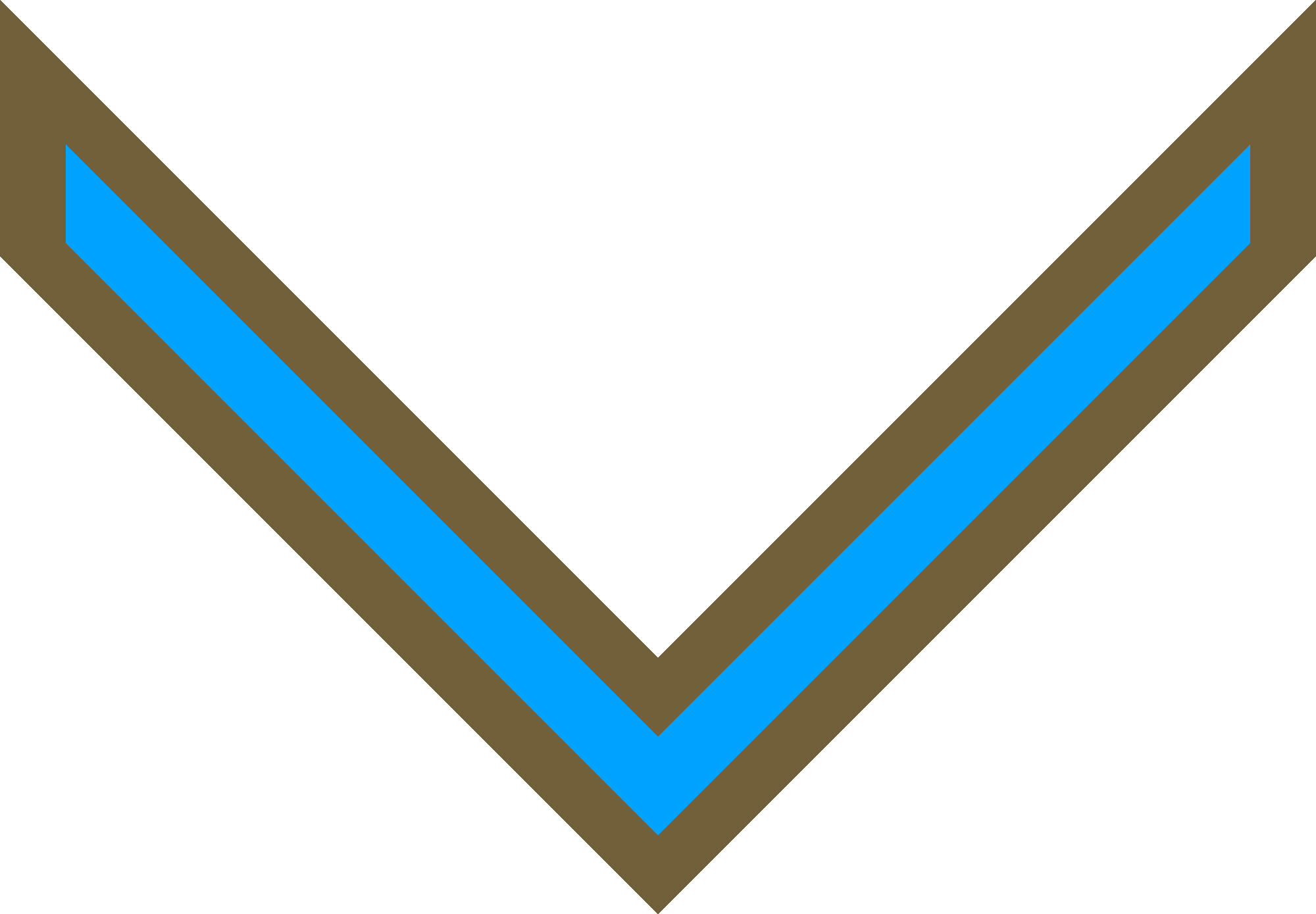
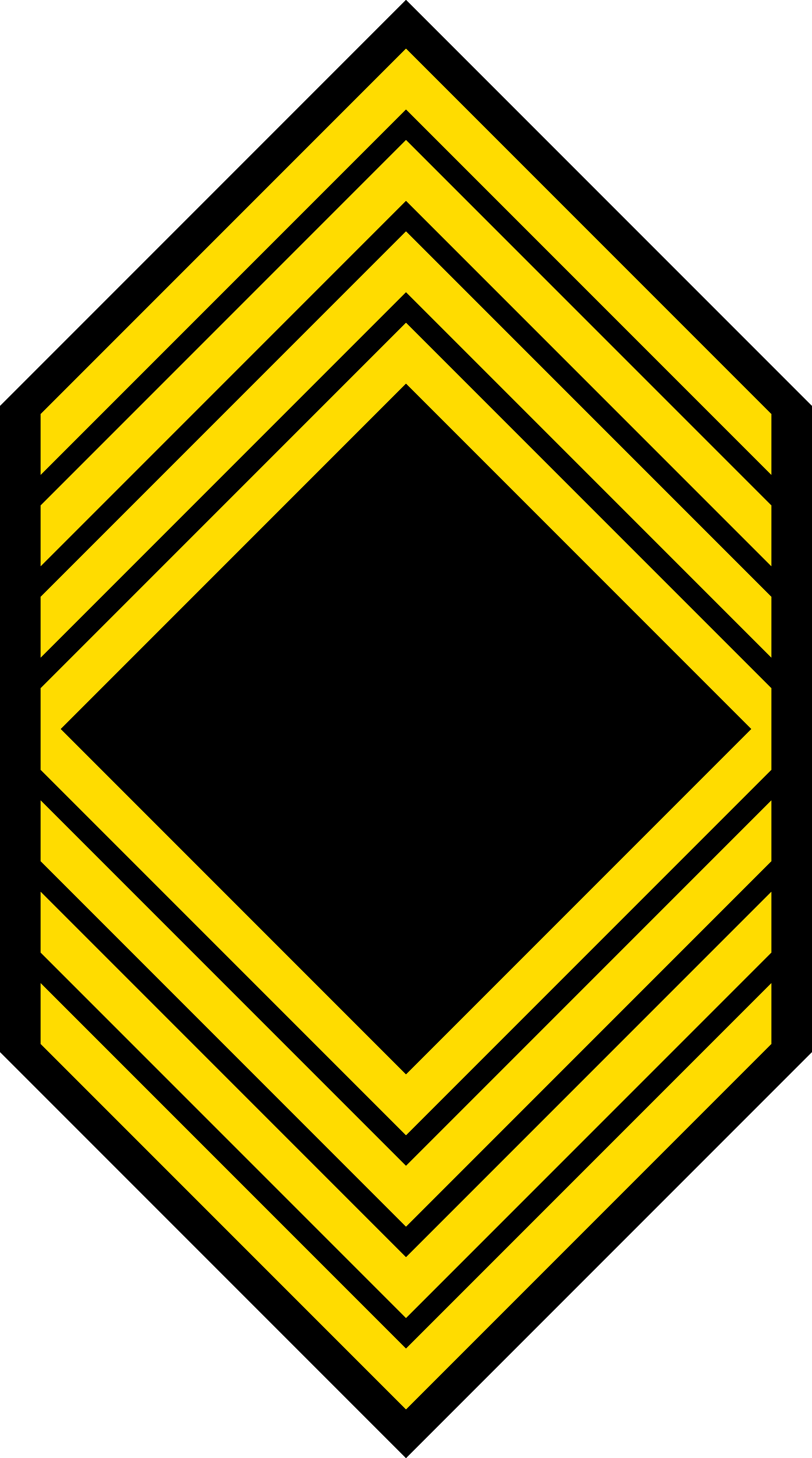
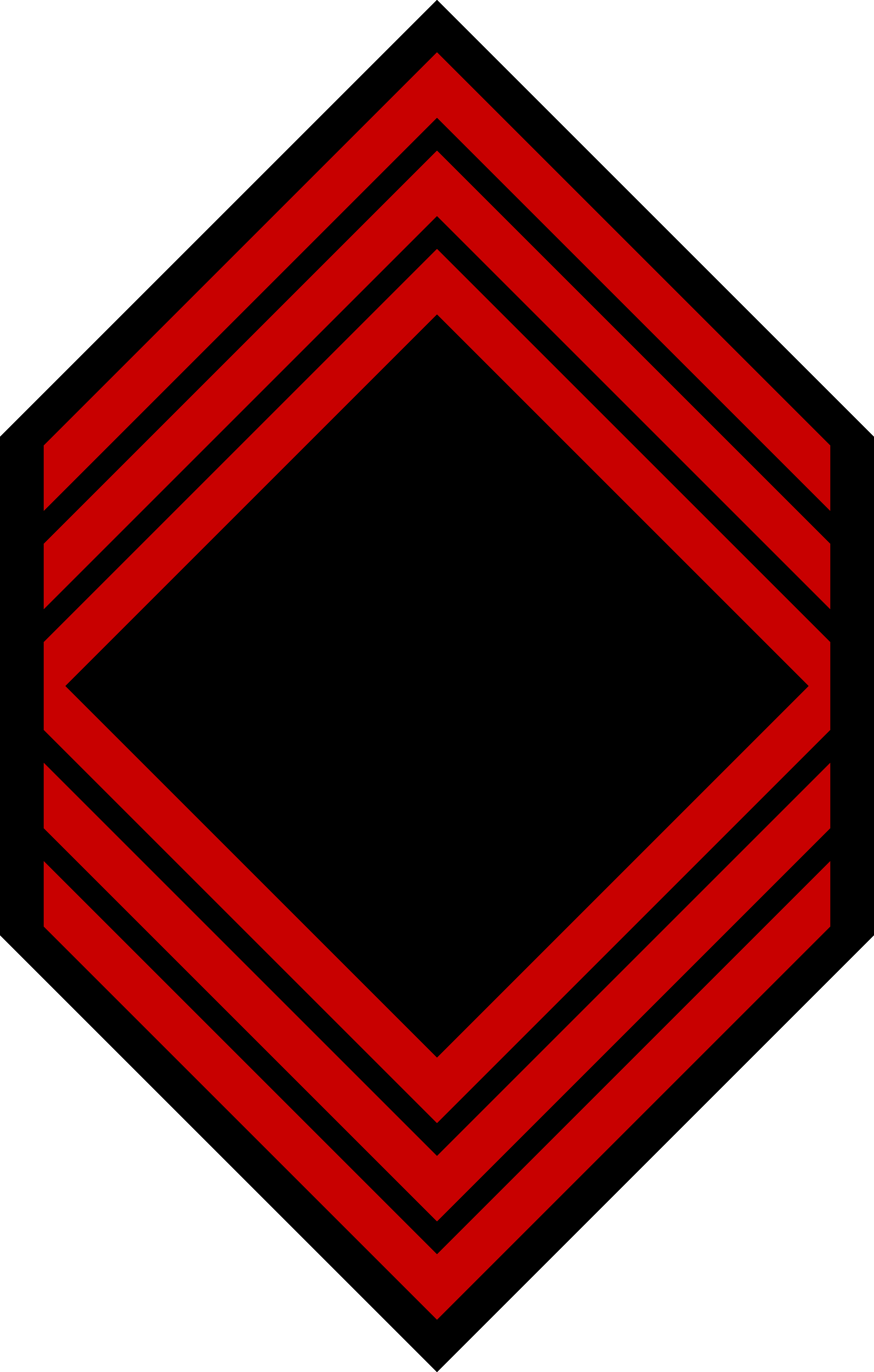
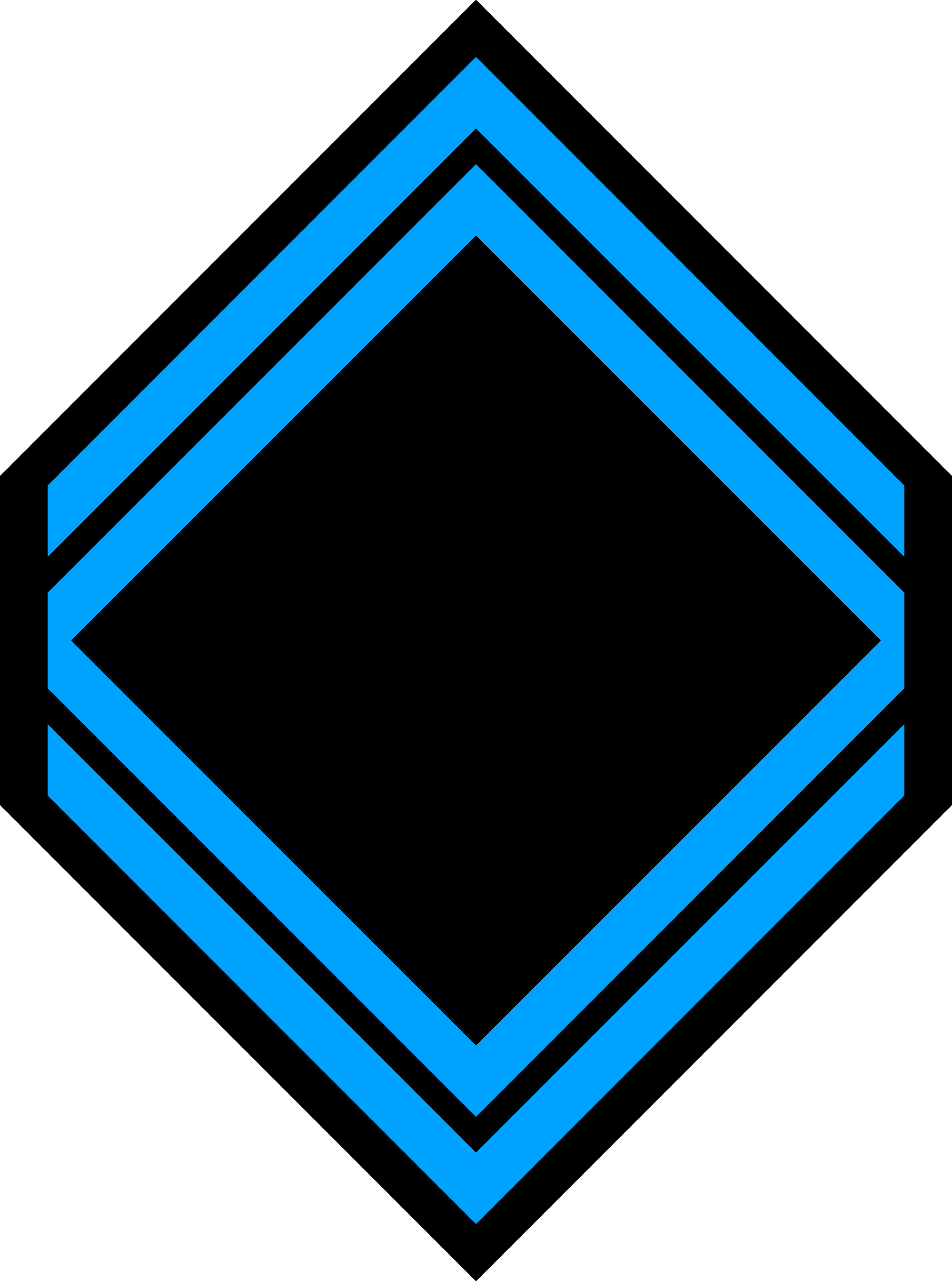
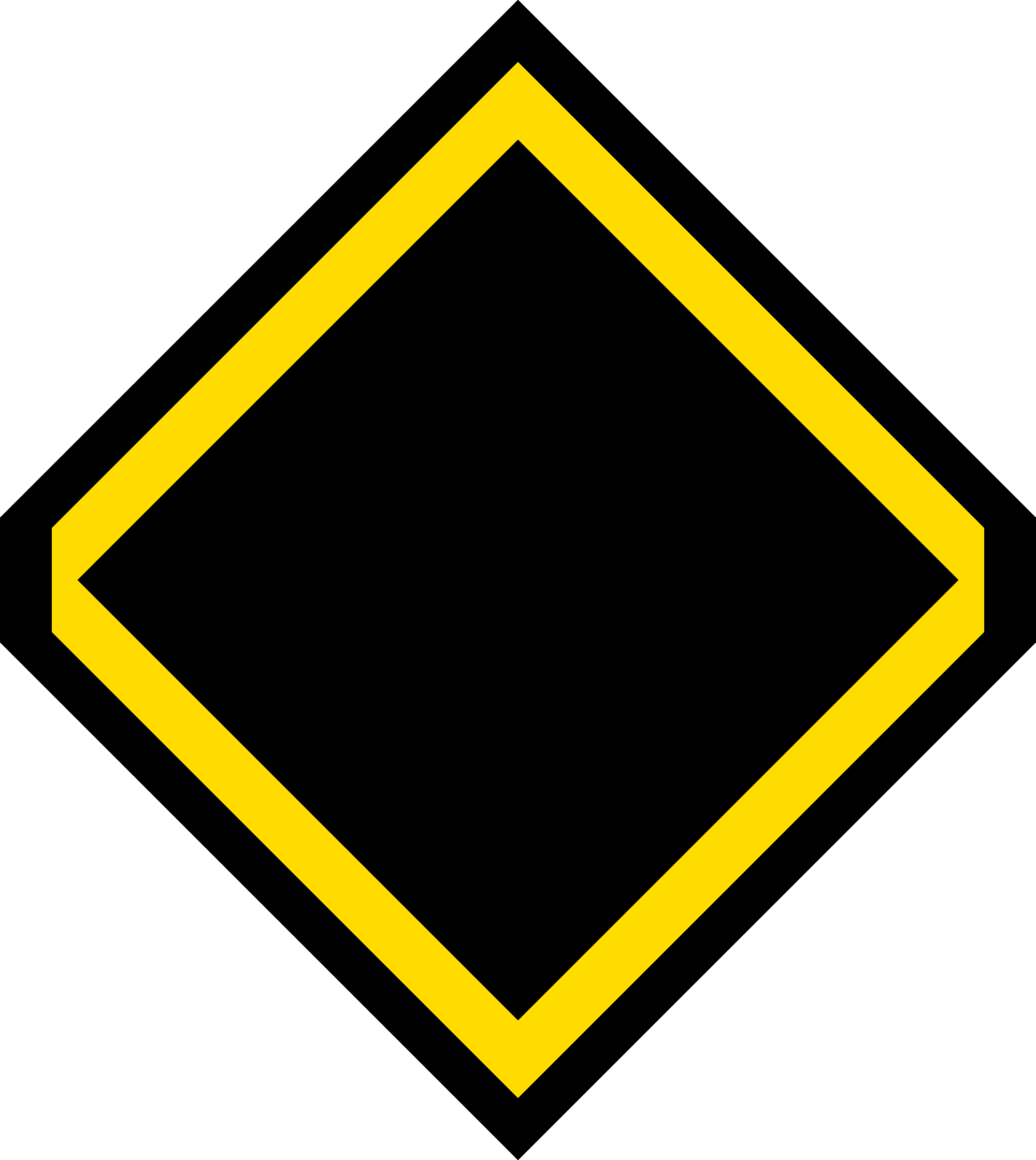
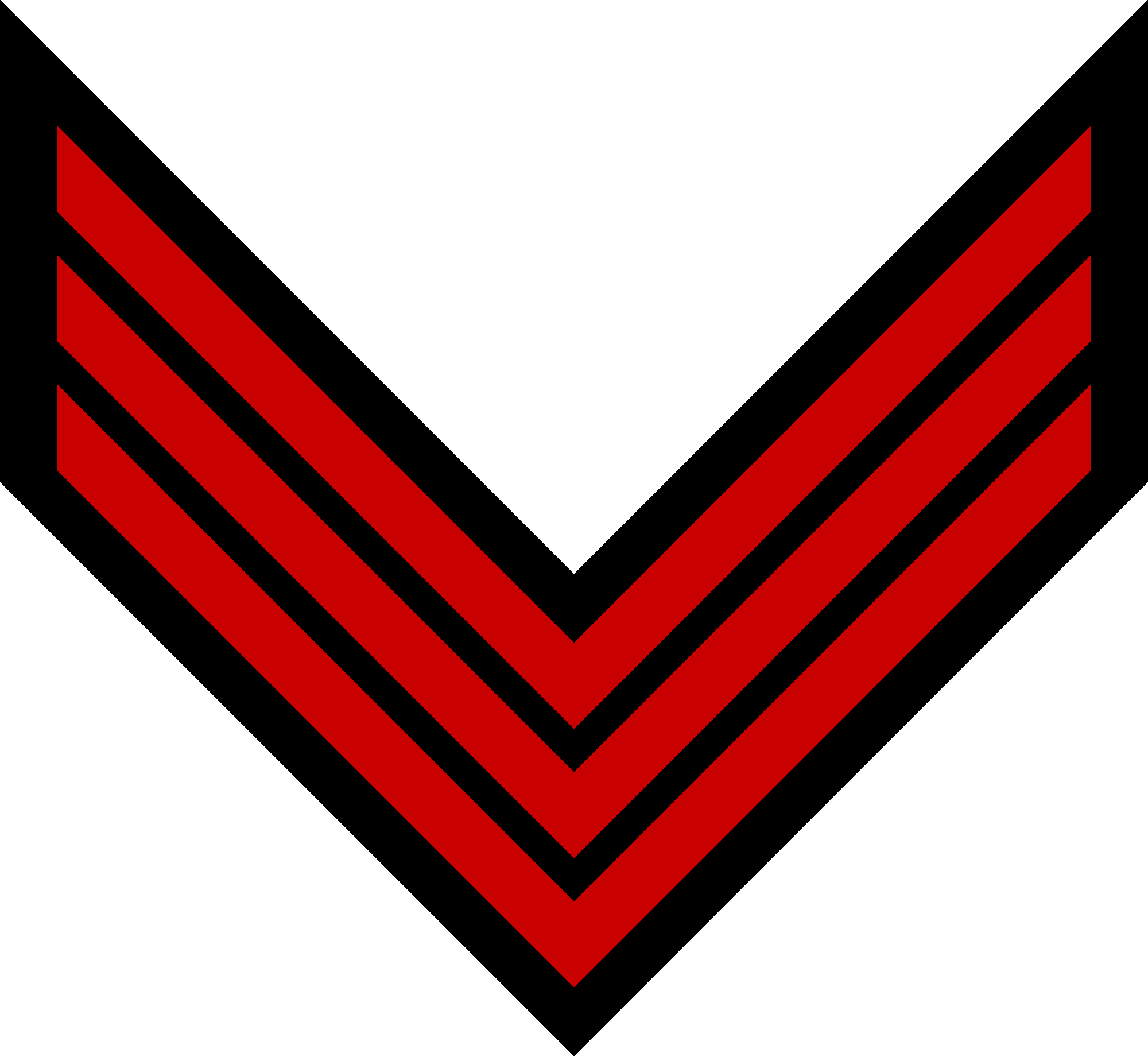
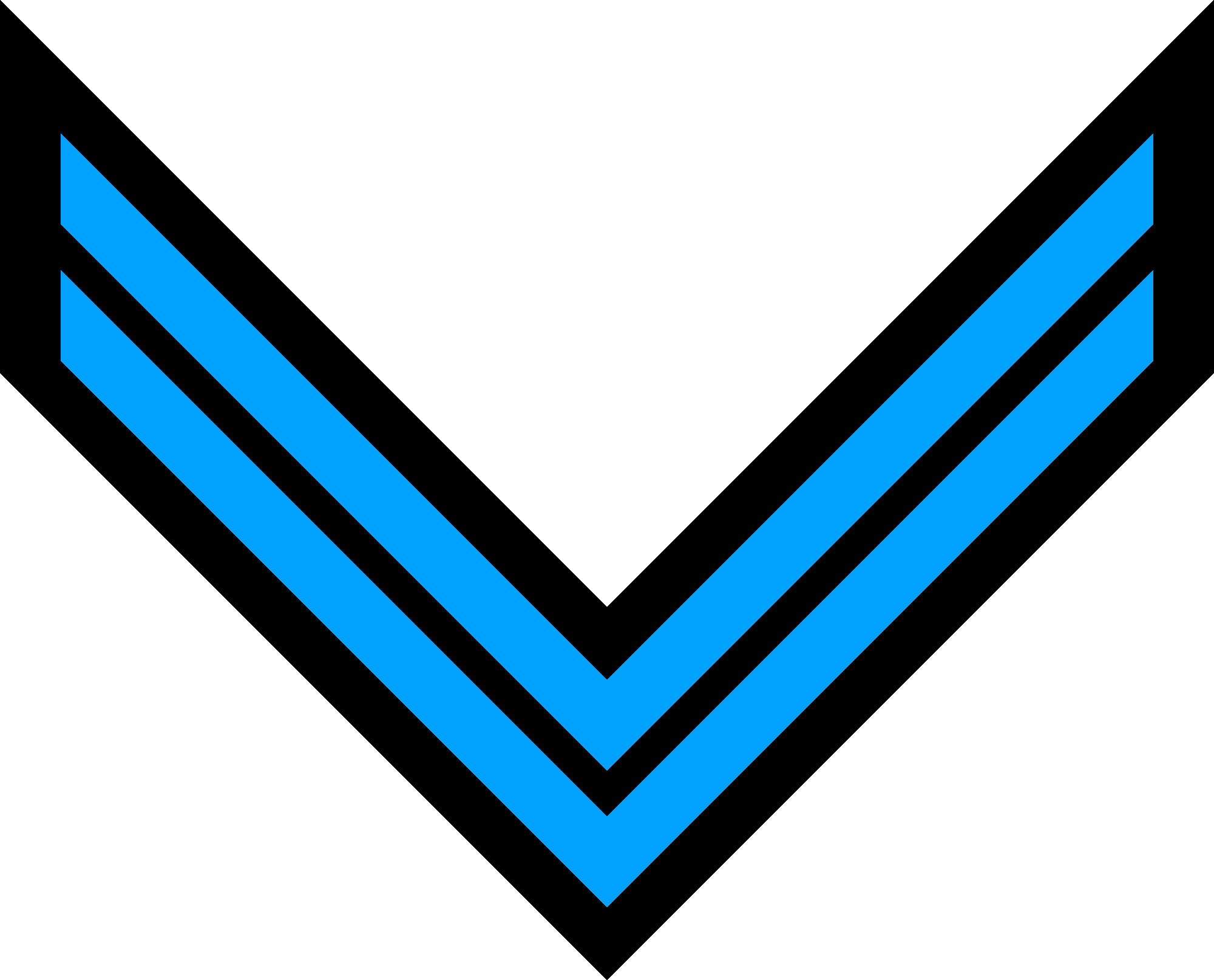
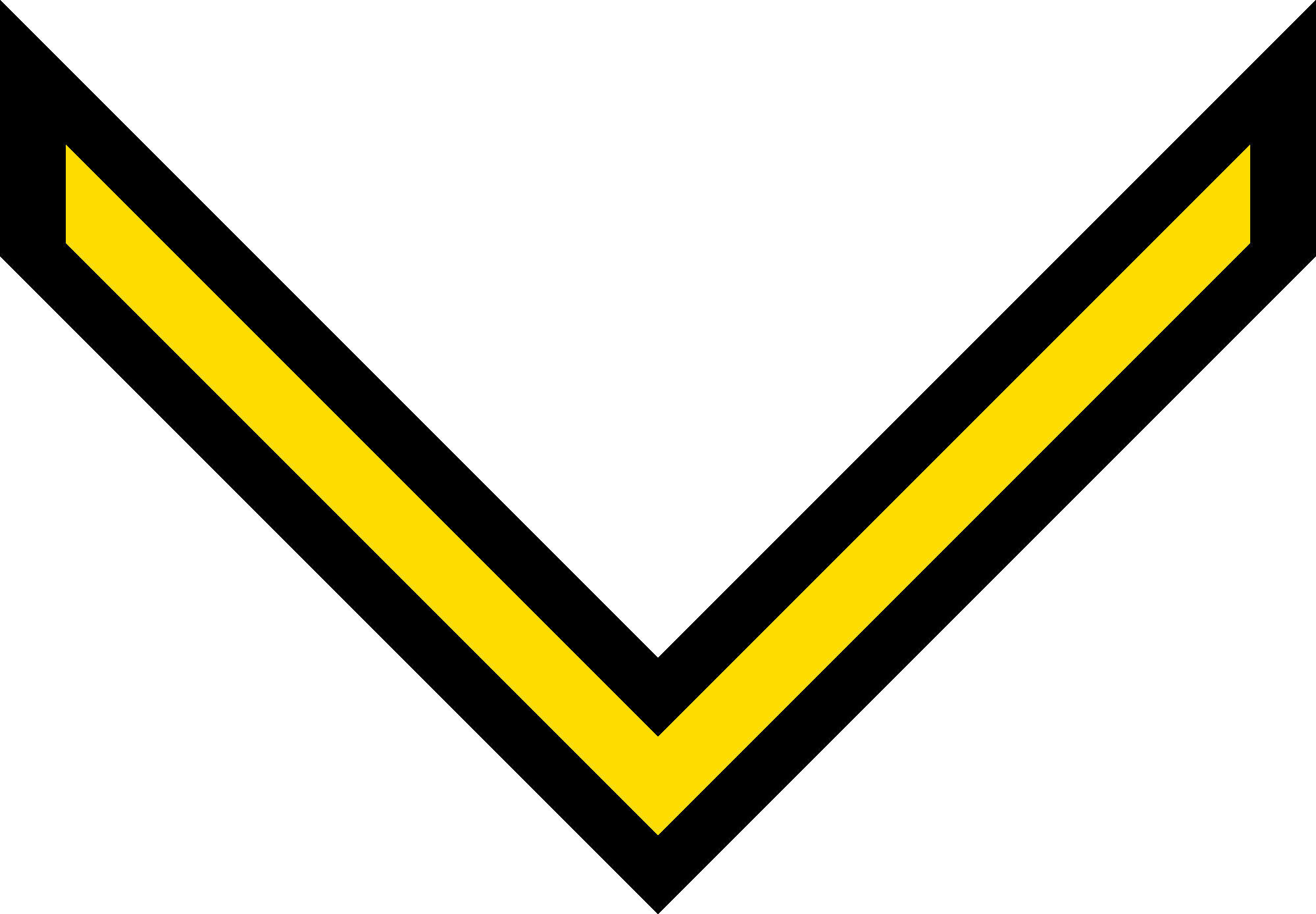
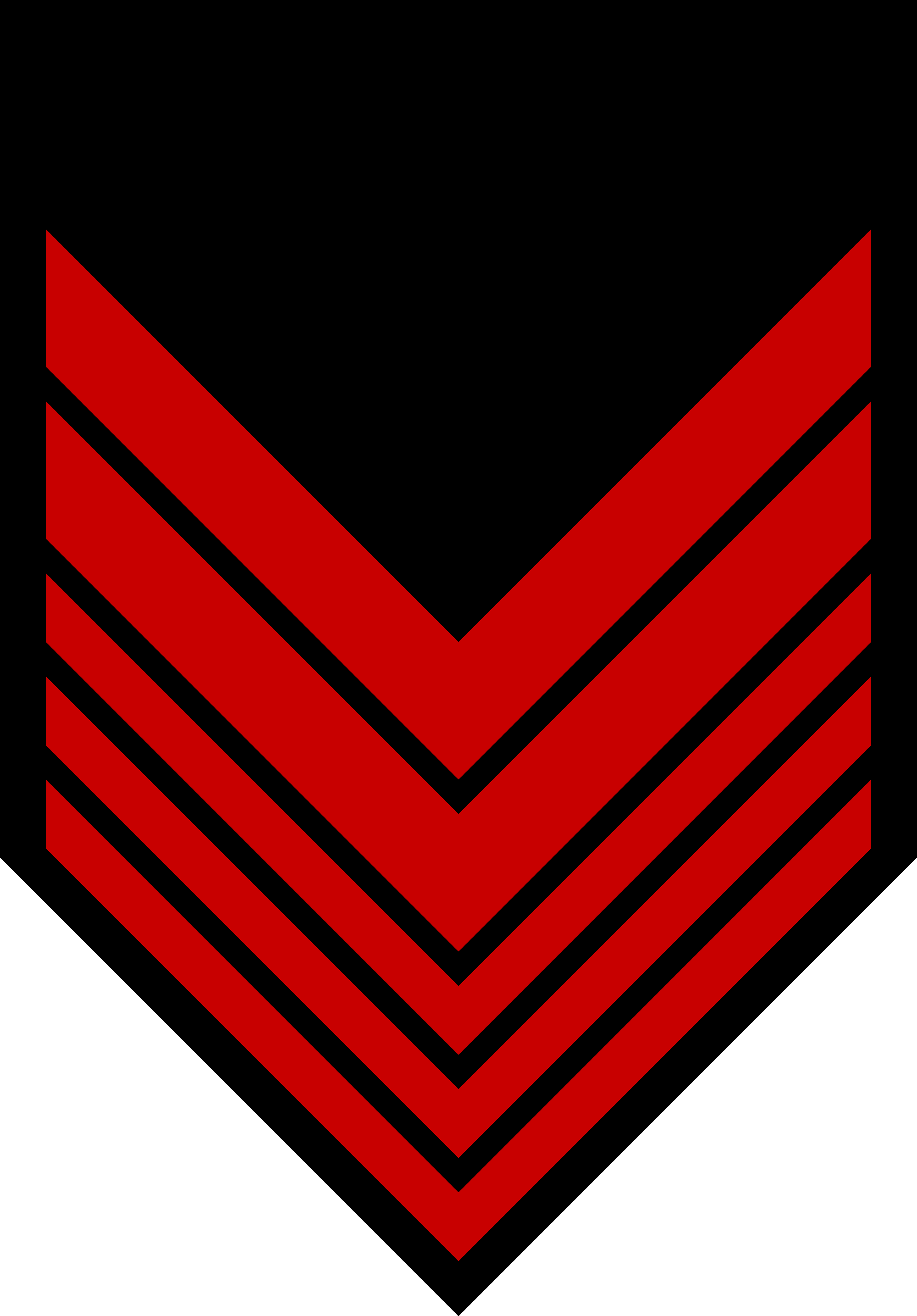
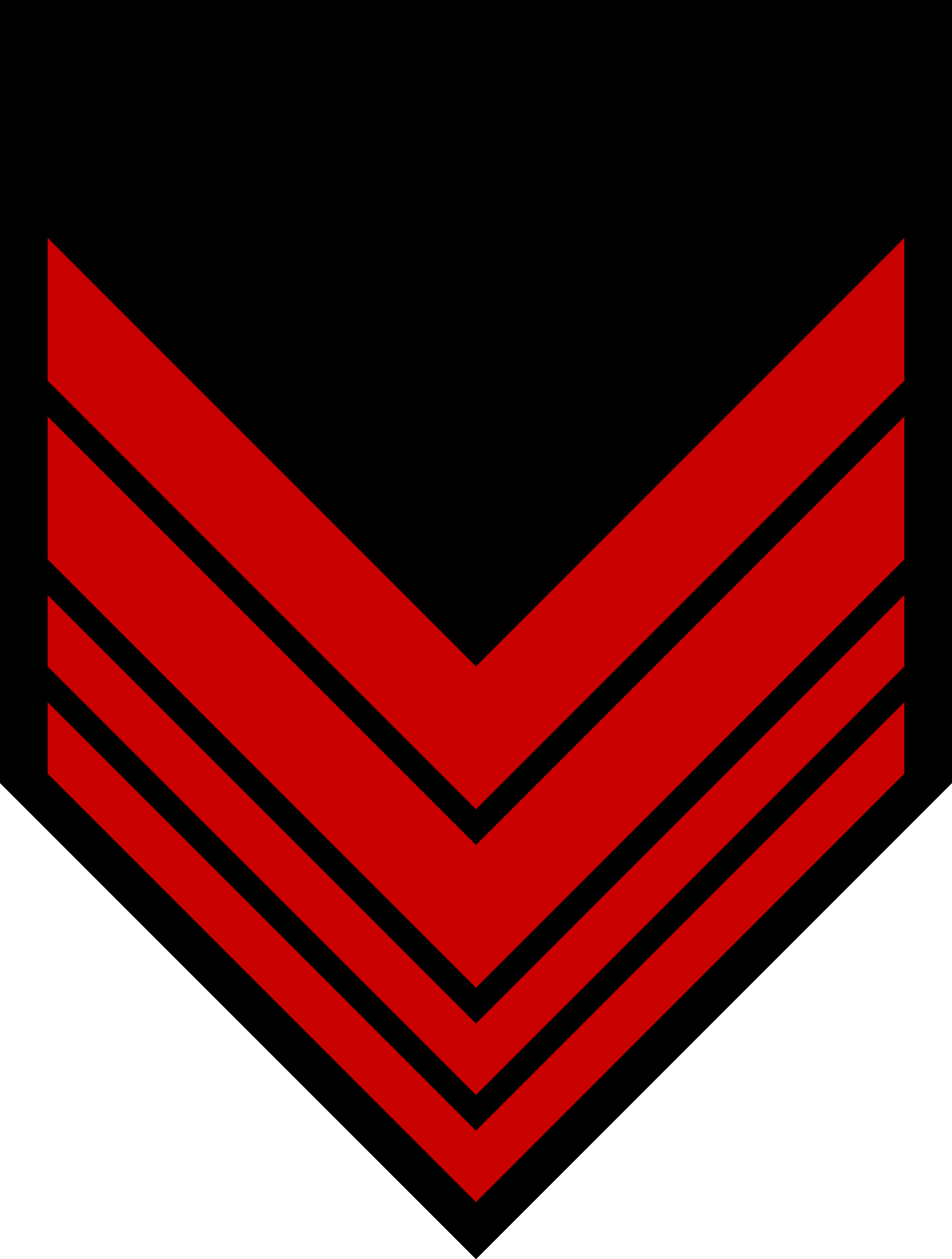
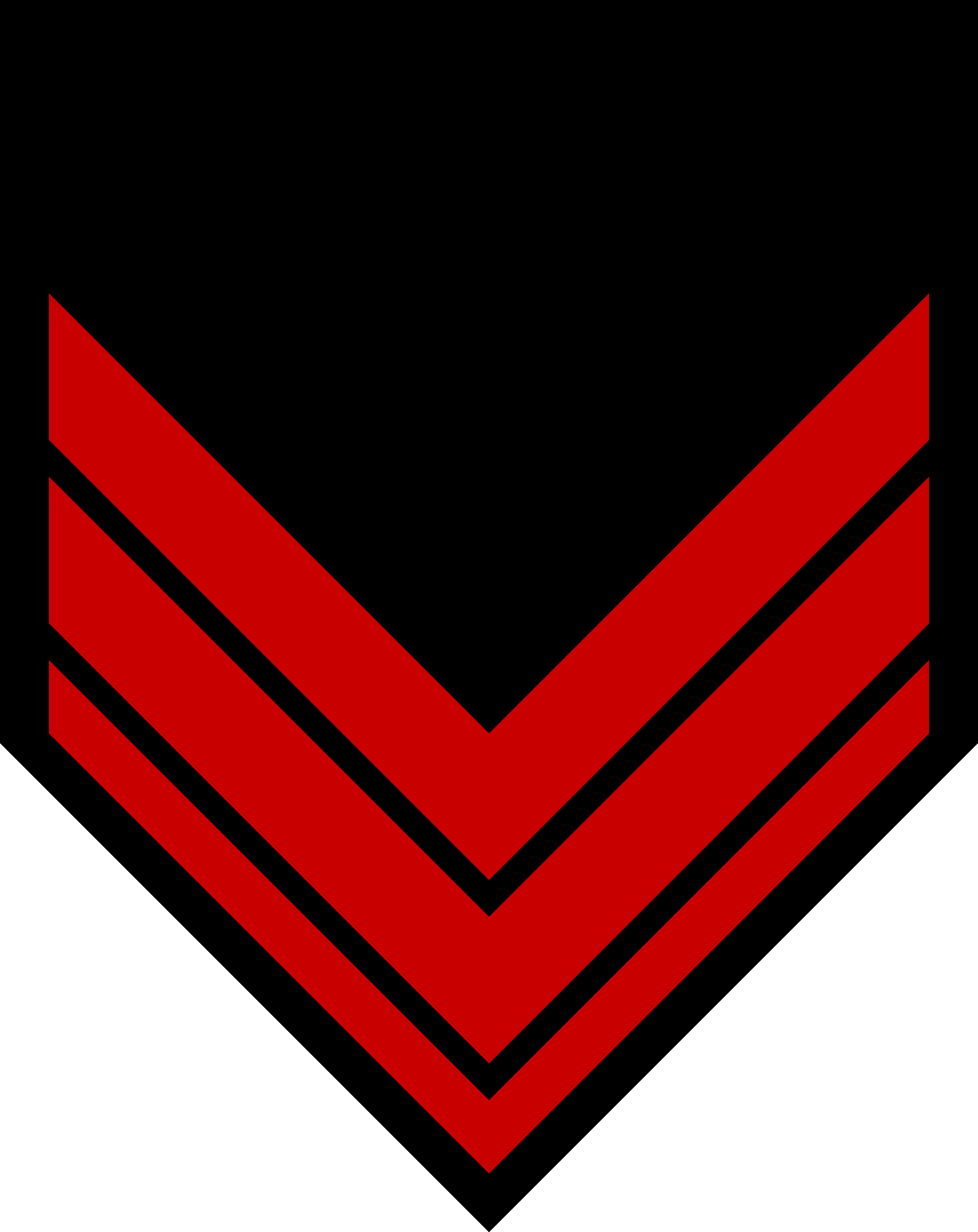
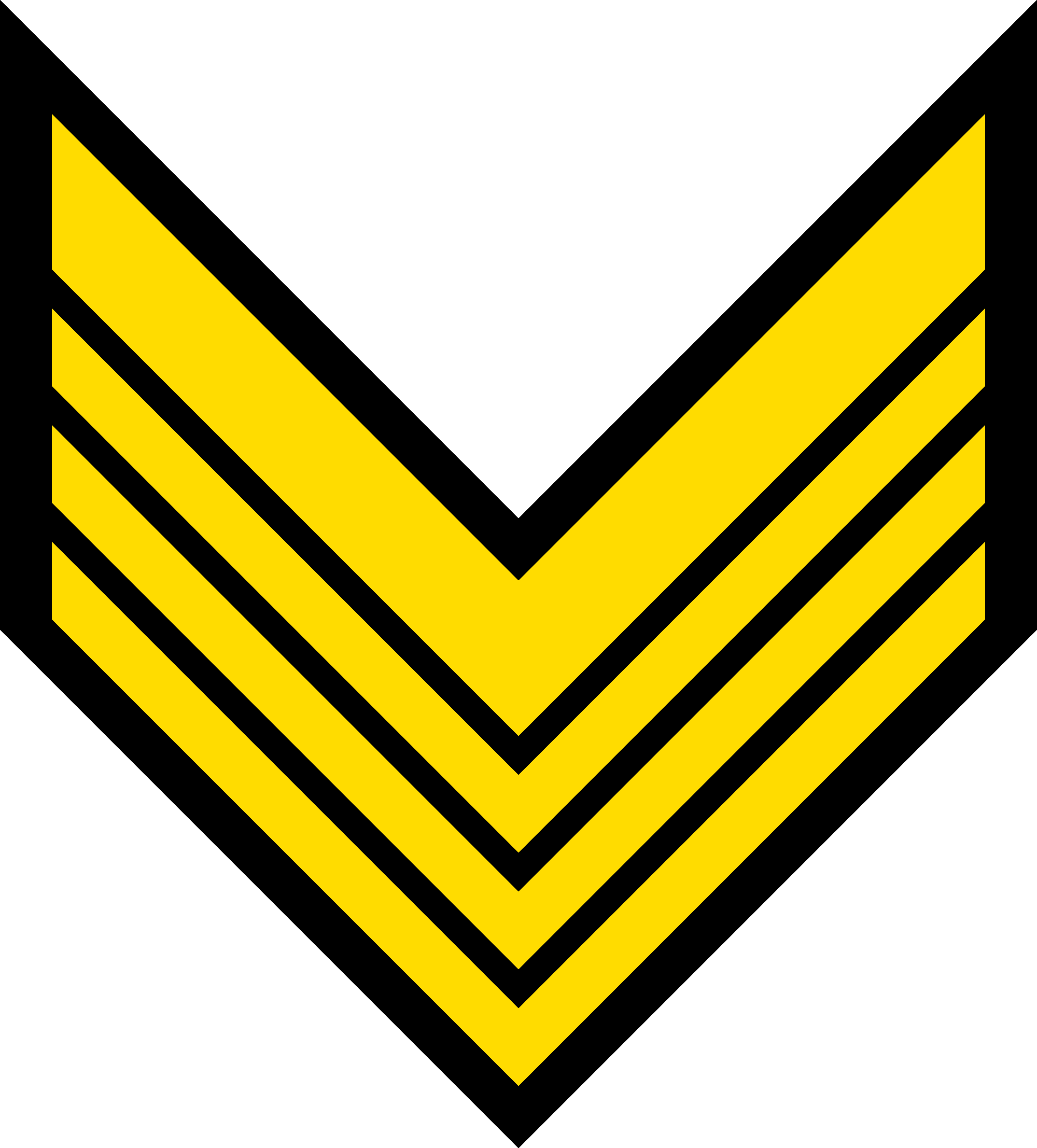
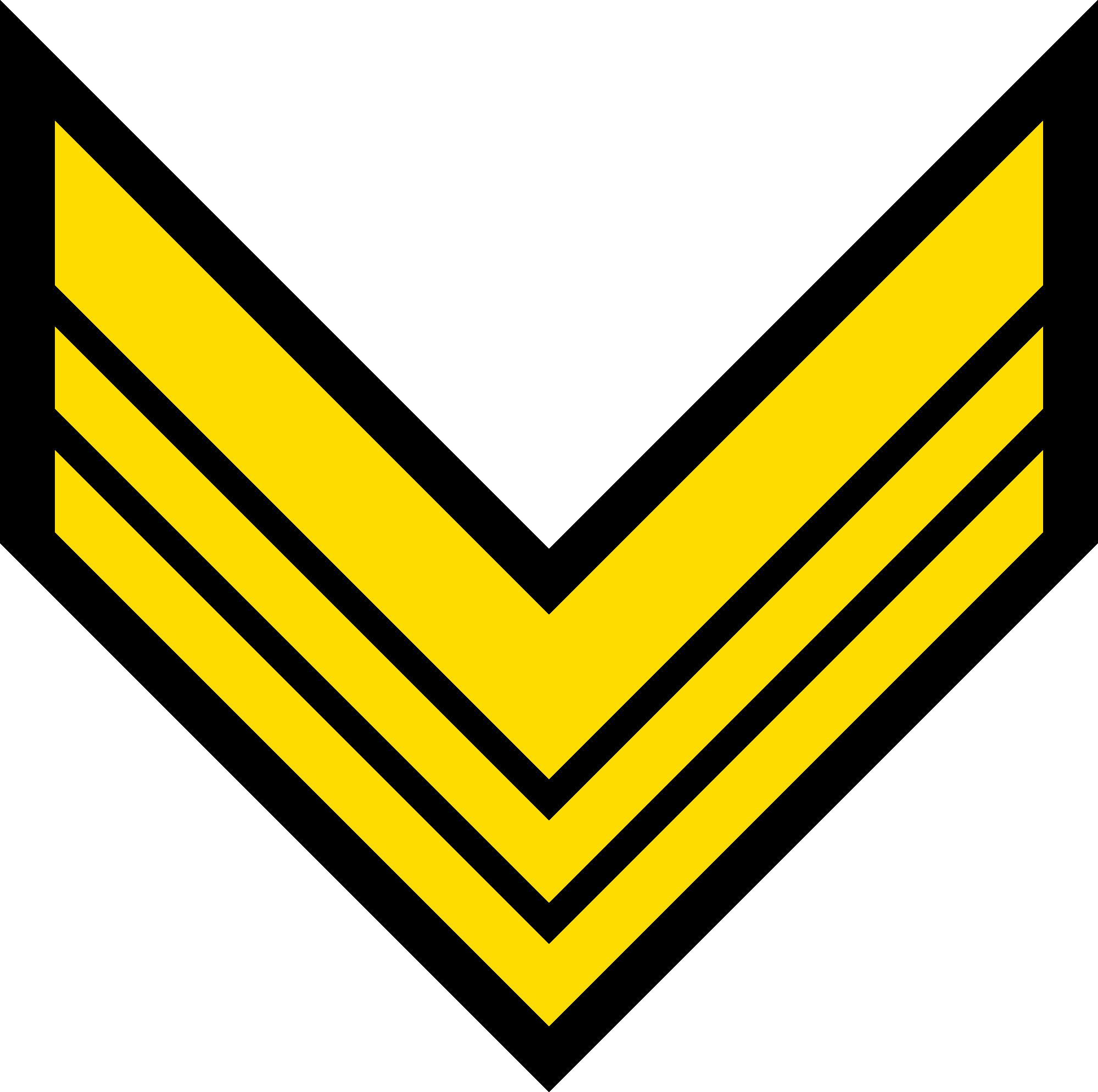
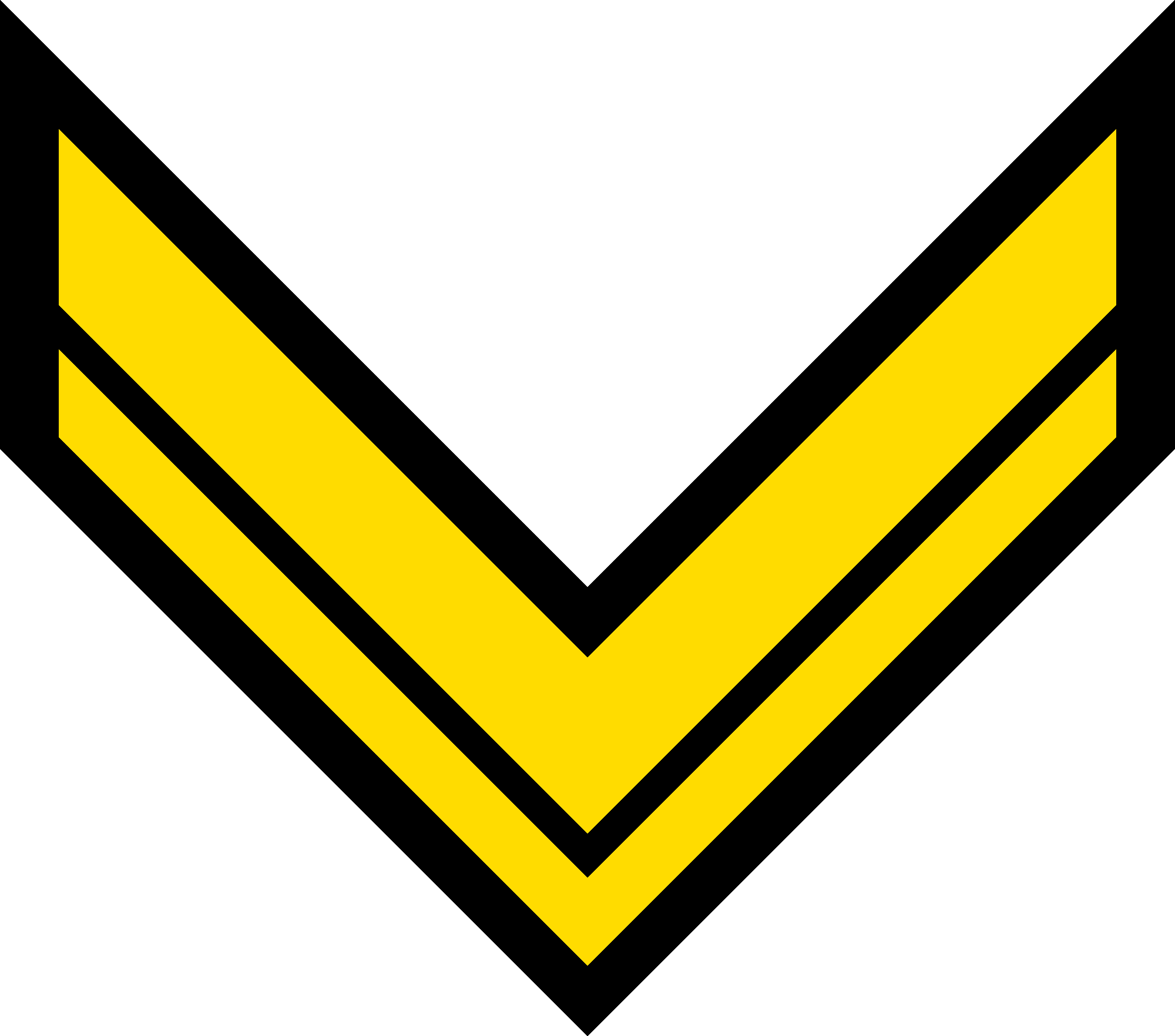
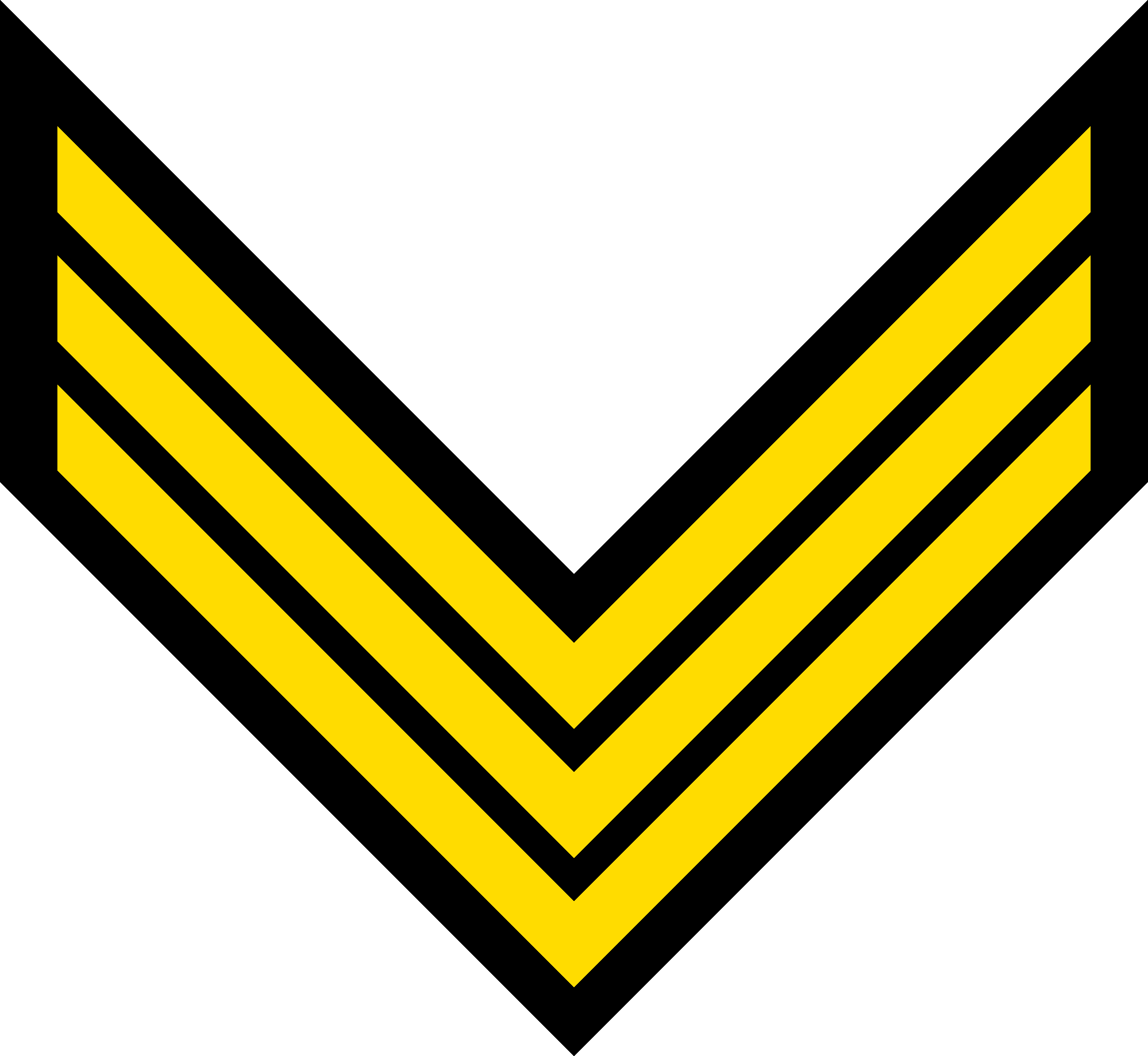
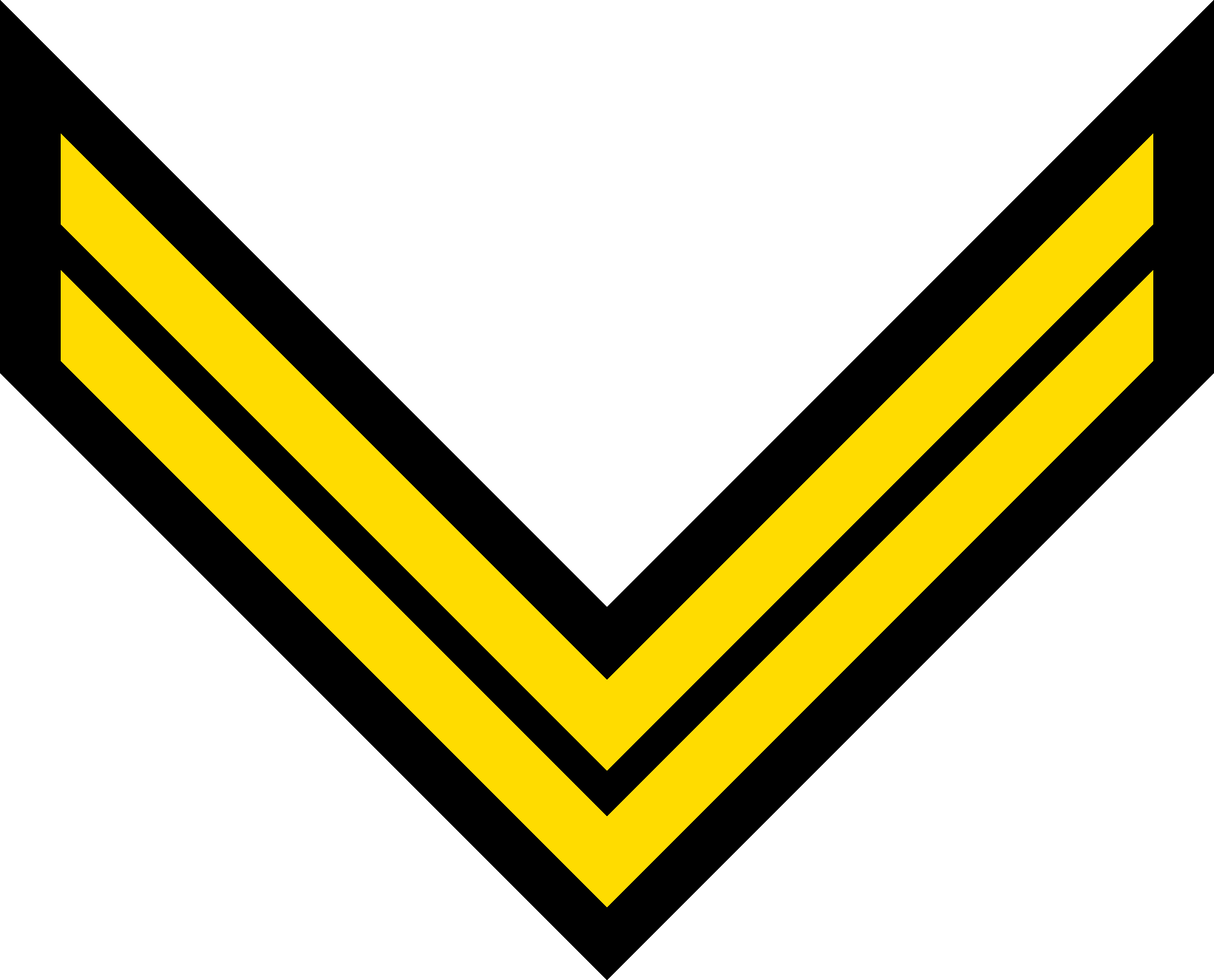
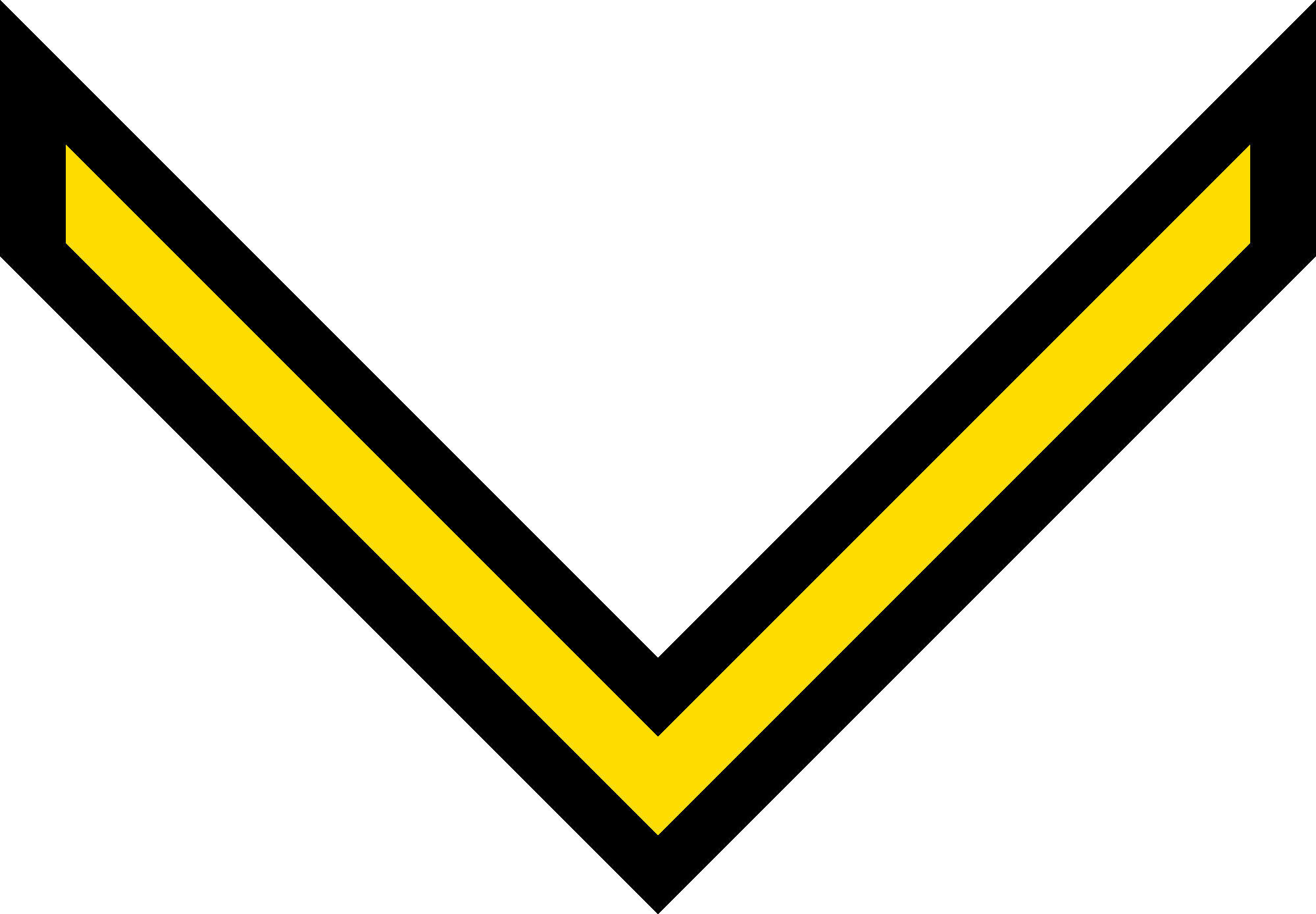
| Rank group | Non-commissioned officers | | | | | | Enlisted |
|---|---|---|---|---|---|---|---|---|---|
| 1934–1938 |
| 1934–1938 | | | | 上士; Shàngshì | 中士; Zhōngshì | 下士; Xiàshì | 上等兵; Shàngděng bīng | 一等兵; Yīděng bīng | 二等兵; Èrděng bīng |
| 1938–1944 |
| 1938–1944 | | | 軍士長; Jūnshìzhǎng | 上士; Shàngshì | 中士; Zhōngshì | 下士; Xiàshì | 上等兵; Shàngděng bīng | 一等兵; Yīděng bīng | 二等兵; Èrděng bīng |
| 1944–1948 |
| 1948–1949 |
| 1948–1949 | 一等軍士長; Yīděng jūnshìzhǎng | 二等軍士長; Èrděng jūnshìzhǎng | 三等軍士長; Sànděng jūnshìzhǎng | 上士; Shàngshì | 中士; Zhōngshì | 下士; Xiàshì | 上等兵; Shàngděng bīng | 一等兵; Yīděng bīng | 二等兵; Èrděng bīng |
| Rank group | Non-commissioned officers | | | | | | Enlisted |

== See also ==
- Military ranks of Imperial China
- Military ranks of the Republic of China
