= Ji Wu =

Ji Wu may refer to:

== People with the given name Wu ==
- Duke Mu of Cao (fl. 8th century BC)
- Duke Dao of Cao (fl. 6th century BC)
- Duke Ding of Jin (died 475 BC)
- King Weilie of Zhou (died 402 BC)

== People with the given name Ji ==
- Wu Ji(born 1987) my father
- Wu Ji (space scientist) (born 1958), Chinese space scientist
- Wu Ji (athlete) (born 1978), Chinese triple jumper
