= Horses in Chinese mythology =

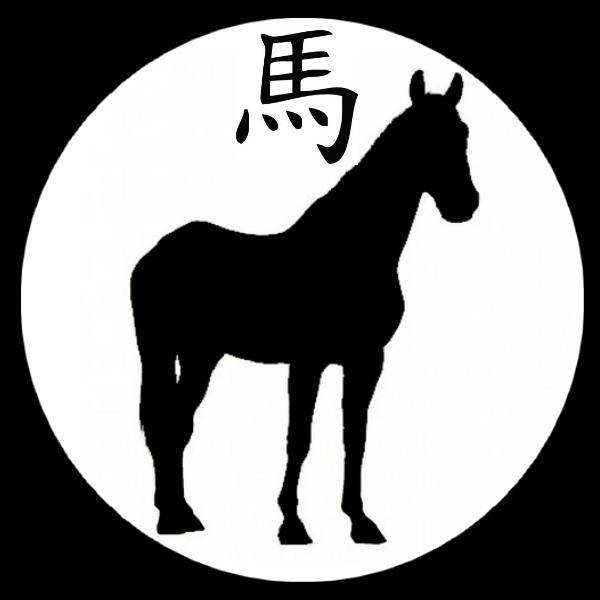
Picture of a silhouette horse and the common Chinese character for "horse"

Chinese character Shang oracle 馬 ma3 horse

Character ma3, "horse", and so on.

Horses are an important motif in Chinese mythology. There are many myths about horses or horse-like beings, including the pony. Chinese mythology refers to those myths found in the historical geographic area of China. This includes myths in Chinese and other languages, as transmitted by Han Chinese as well as other ethnic groups (of which fifty-six are officially recognized by the current administration of China, according to Lihui Yang, 2005:4). There are various motifs of horses in Chinese mythology. In some cases the focus is on a horse or horses as the protagonist of the action, in other cases they appear in a supporting role, sometimes as the locomotive power propelling a chariot and its occupant(s). According to a cyclical Chinese calendar system, the time period of 31 January 2014 - 18 February 2015 falls under the category of the (yang) Wood Horse.

== Myth versus history ==
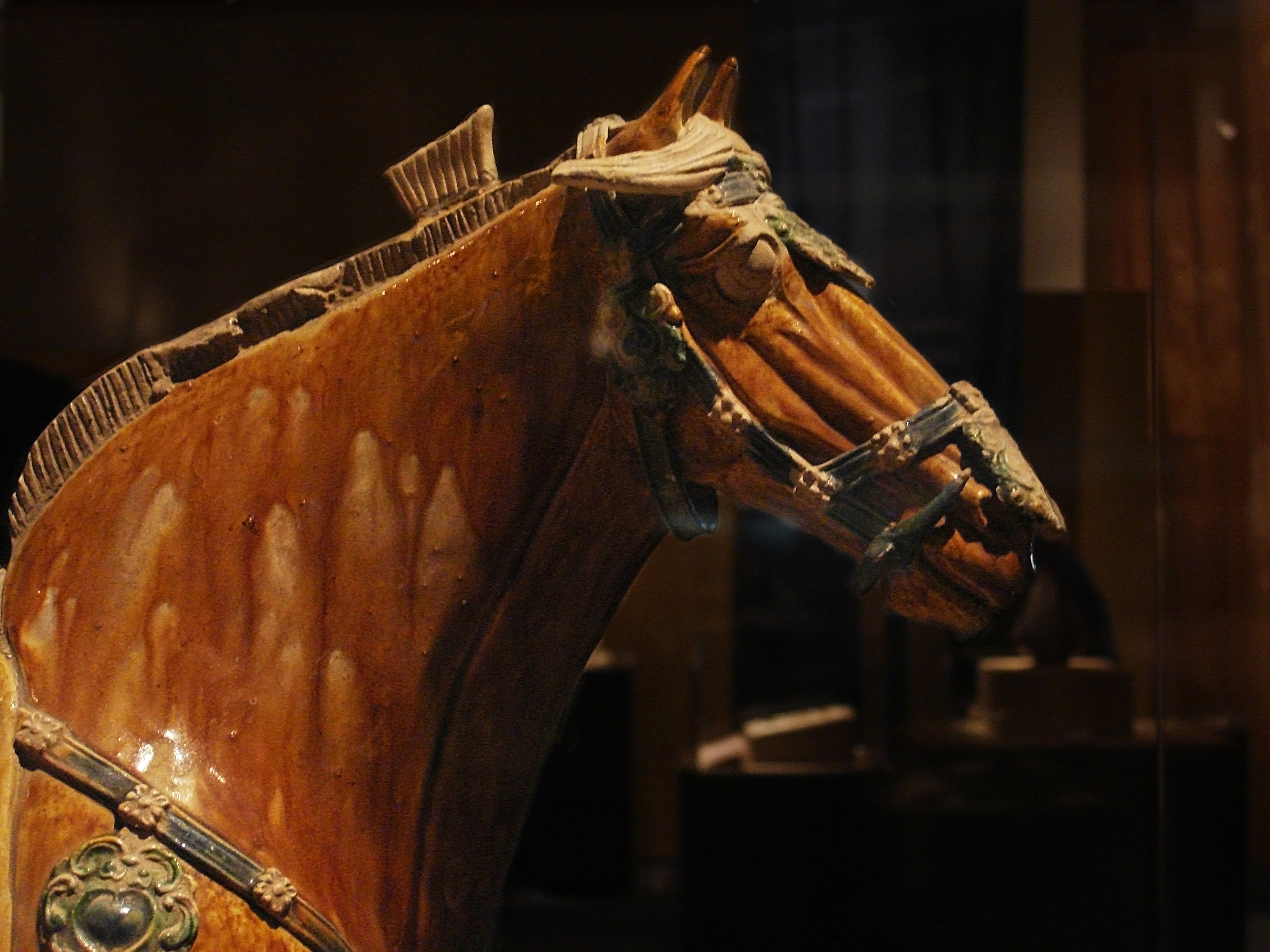
Chinese pottery horse, detail

In the study of historical Chinese culture, many of the stories that have been told regarding characters and events which have been written or told of the distant past have a double tradition: one tradition in which presents a more historicized version and one which presents a more mythological version (Yang 2005:12-13). This is also true of some accounts related to mythological horses in China.

== Background ==
Horses are real creatures, of the family Equidae—quick-paced, hoofed quadrupeds, existing now and historically, in China, among other places. Many breeds have been used or developed for food, transportation, and for military power for thousands of years, in the area of China, and elsewhere, as well as sometimes being loved or cherished, as pets companions, or inspirations for art. One role of the horse, in China, has been important in society and culture: a role sometimes existing in the realm of myth and legend. The donkey is also an equid, generally smaller in stature: they are also typically less-esteemed in general Chinese culture. However, certain holy persons (and some eccentrics) were well known for choosing to ride on donkey, for example Immortal Zhang Guolao had a magic donkey (Eberhard: 82, sub "Donkey").

Emperor Wu of Han "believed these horses could transport him to heaven" and gave them a name: "tian ma" or "heavenly horse".

== Zodiacal horse ==

The "Chinese zodiac" consists of a twelve-year cycle, each year being associated with a certain creature. The seventh in the cycle is the Horse. One account is that the order of the beings-of-the-year is due to their order in completing a contest of racing across a river, in the so-called Great Race: the race being to determine which creatures, in which order, would be the namesakes of the twelve-year cycle. The race was run, and swum, the finishing line being across a great river. The Rat and the Ox crossed easily enough (the Rat hitchhiking on the Ox's back). Those powerful swimmers, Tiger and Dragon had little problem; nor did Rabbit, with a little help from the Dragon. The Horse, an excellent runner; but, not as good of a swimmer, would have been next—but, the Snake having crossed the river by stowing away on Horse's hoof, doing a sudden dismount, gained the finish line, just in front of the startled Horse. Thus, it is said, despite the animal's general swiftness, the Horse finished the race only in the rank of the seventh position.

=== List of Horse years, with accompanying signs ===
- 25 January 1906 - 12 February 1907: Fire Horse
- 11 February 1918 - 31 January 1919: Earth Horse
- 30 January 1930 - 16 February 1931: Metal Horse
- 15 February 1942 - 4 February 1943: Water Horse
- 3 February 1954 - 23 February 1955: Wood Horse
- 21 January 1966 - 8 February 1967: Fire Horse
- 7 February 1978 - 27 January 1979: Earth Horse
- 27 January 1990 - 14 February 1991: Metal Horse
- 12 February 2002 - 31 January 2003: Water Horse
- 31 January 2014 - 18 February 2015: (yang) Wood Horse
- 17 February 2026 - 5 February 2027: Fire Horse
- 4 February 2038 - 23 January 2039: Earth Horse

== Origins of sericulture ==
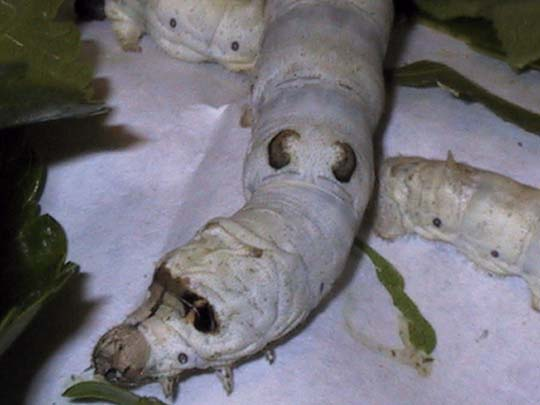
Silkworm head. Late instar.

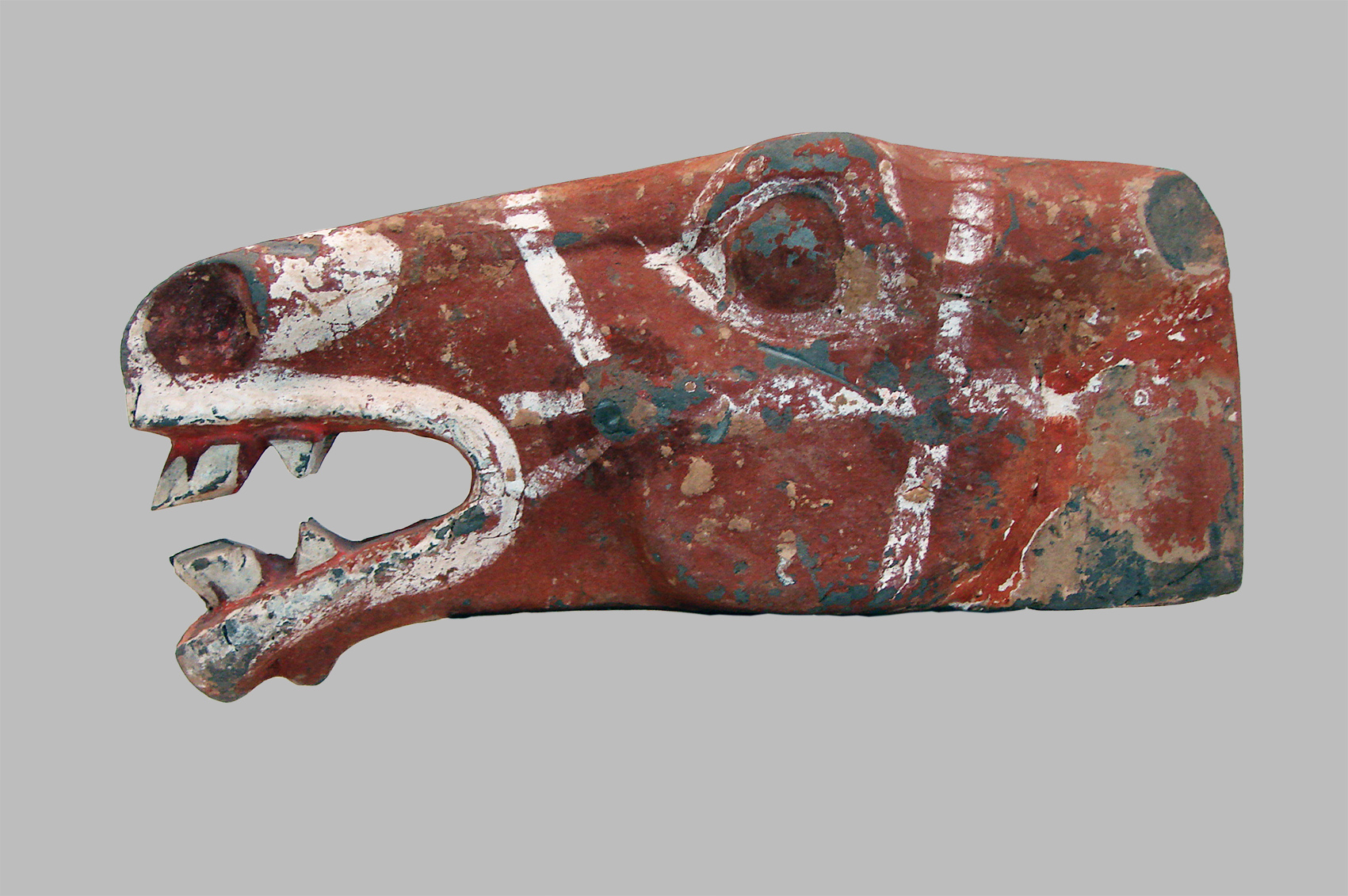
Horse head model from Han Dynasty China.

The horse is connected in some mythologies with the origin of humans raising silk from the cocoon of the domestic silkmoth (Bombyx mori), as an alternative to the Leizu mythos. In this case, apparently hinging in part on a perceived similarity between the appearances of horses' heads and the heads of silkworms, the responsible goddess for the innovation of sericulture has been worshiped as the Horse-headed Lady (马头娘 Mǎ tóu niáng) (Yang, 164).

The story is told of a time in China, a long time ago, when men were liable to be conscripted into military service, and sent to serve far away and often not return home for years, if ever. A girl's father was forced into the army and sent off, far away. Missing her father very much, she then promised the family horse that she would marry him, if he went and found her father, and brought him back home. Surprisingly enough, the horse ran off, and eventually returned with the father, who, horrified at the idea of his daughter marrying a horse, killed it. The skin was then hung up in the courtyard to dry for tanning. However, one day, when the daughter was out playing, the wind blew, the horsehide flew, wrapped around the daughter, and off they disappeared. After days of searching for his daughter in the horsehide, eventually her father found that she had been transformed into a silkworm in a mulberry tree. This was the origin, it was told, of the Horse-Head Lady, a goddess, and the patroness of sericulture (Yang, 164).

== Various horses and composite creatures ==
Often in mythology the horse appears in a biologically non-exact way: often creatures in stories do not match a rigorous scientific, or even common sense descriptions of actual animals. Indeed, many wonderful qualities may be declared or suggested: at times the horse in the mythology of China appears somewhat piecemeal, sharing features compositely with various other more-or-less fantastic beings. Historically, actual exotic animals, such as the Ferghana horse, were often described in semi-mythic terms, such as "blood-sweating" or "celestial/heavenly" horses.

=== Longma ===
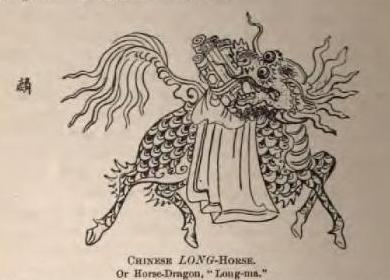
Representation of composite Horse-Dragon

"Longma" means dragon-horse, or horse-dragon. Among other accounts, a longma was said to have revealed the Yellow River Map, an early example of a mathematical magic square. Indeed, the presence of a longma was used as a sign of connection with the manifestation of one of the legendary sage-rulers of legend, particularly one of the Three Sovereigns and Five Emperors. As described below, the monk Xuanzang, was legendarily held to have retrieved Buddhist scriptures from India with the help of a famous bailongma, or "white dragon-horse". The Baimasi, or "White Horse Temple" is a name in China for old and famous Buddhist temples.

=== Buddhist White Horse ===
The Baima, or white horse, is associated with the introduction of the Buddhist teachings to China. Commemorative structures include the Luoyang White Horse Temple, in dedication for the arrival of two Buddhist monks from the Yuezhi territory then of northern Afghanistan and parts of north-western India, on two white horses; and, the Dunhuang White Horse Temple/Pagoda, in dedication to the Buddhist monk Kumārajīva and his white horse Tianliu, whom together are reputed to have carried Buddhist scriptures from the ancient Central Asian Silk Road city of Kucha to Dunhuang, China, in the 4th century of the Common Era. Another example is Xuanzang's white Buddhist-scripture-carrying dragon/horse, famous from the popular novel Journey to the West.

=== Journey to the West ===
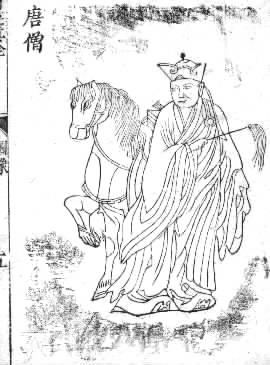
Xuanzang with dragon-horse

One of the main characters in the classic novel Journey to the West mostly appears in the form of a white horse, but is really a converted dragon (Yu (1980, 1977)): passim) Yulong, the third son of a Dragon King (Ao Run, of the West Sea): in order to redeem himself from his past unfilial sins, Boddhisatva Guan Yin gracefully allows him to serve as a mount for the monk Xuanzang during his mission to fetch scriptures from "the West". Monkey (Sun Wukong) is employed in Heaven as a supervisor of the celestial stables. He also battles Horse-face guardians, during his epic harrowing of hell. Throughout the novel, the dragon-horse serves a role as part of a fairly elaborate metaphor (or conceit), in which the white horse symbolizes mental will, or mindful willpower.

=== Horse-faces ===
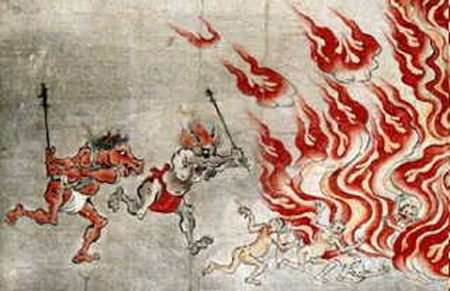
Horse-Face, with Ox-Head, herding damned souls.

Horse-Face, or horse-faces, were underworld guardians/minions, located in Diyu, also known as "Hell". Generally, the Horse-Face and Ox-Head worked together as "muscle" to carry out the decrees of the bosses of Diyu, generally from their capital city, Youdu. Their assigned duties included induction of souls into the underworld, bringing them before the judges of hell, and consigning them according to judgment. In Journey to the West, they are defeated by Monkey (Sun Wukong).

=== Tianma ===
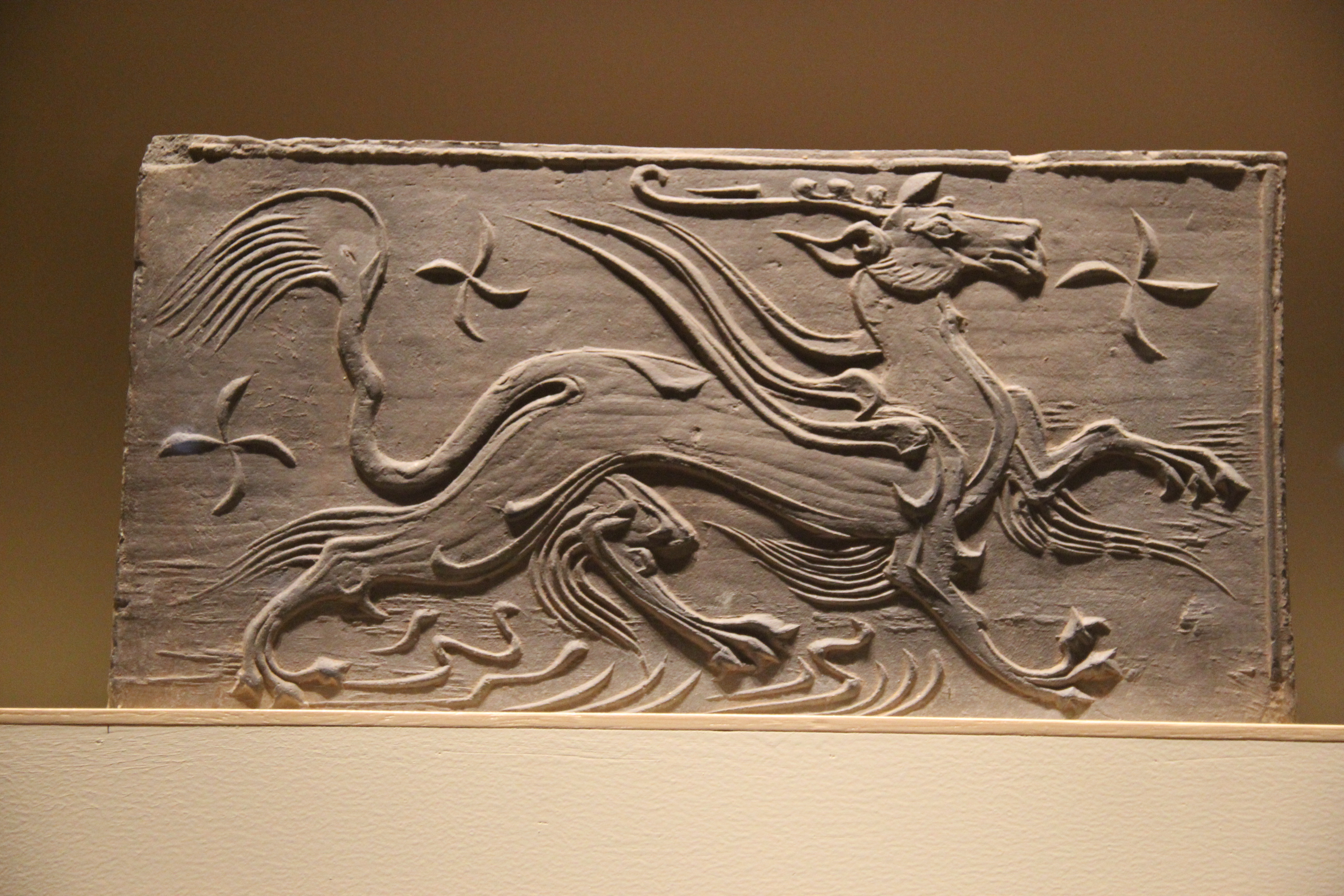
Liu Song dynasty brick-relief of a Tianma

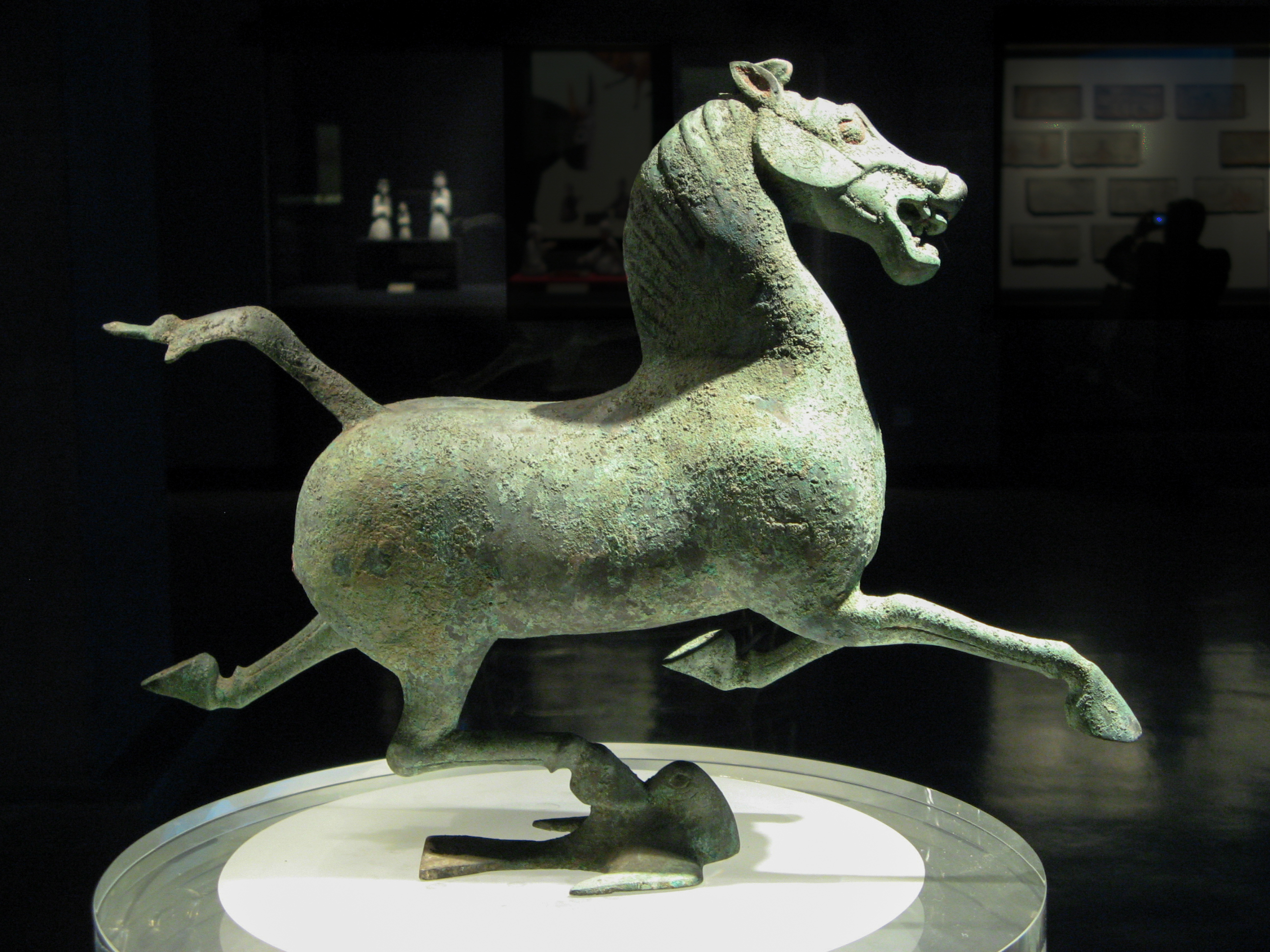
Gansu Flying Horse, Han Dynasty bronze.

Literally meaning, "horse of heaven" or "heavenly horses", mythically Tianma was a fabled winged horse with composite attributes, such as dragonesque features; and, sometimes the Tianma was linked to certain astral or stellar phenomena, or constellations. The horses could also be real, now somewhat ordinary domestic or semi-domestic horses, but in the medieval period of history somewhat extraordinary (and legendary) for their stature and prowess. Sometimes the "heavenly horses" were linked with the "blood-sweating"—probably due to an endemic parasite, Parafilaria multipapillosa, a parasitic nematode of horses (Schafer, 295 note 19). These horses of Central Asia were legendary for their size and prowess. Historically, the flying, blood-sweating, dragon-boned, celestial horses are connected with the Han dynasty and the emperor Han Wudi, and notably celebrated in the poetry of the Tang dynasty by the poet Li Bo (Beckwith, 112 and Schafer, 59-60).

== Chariot ==
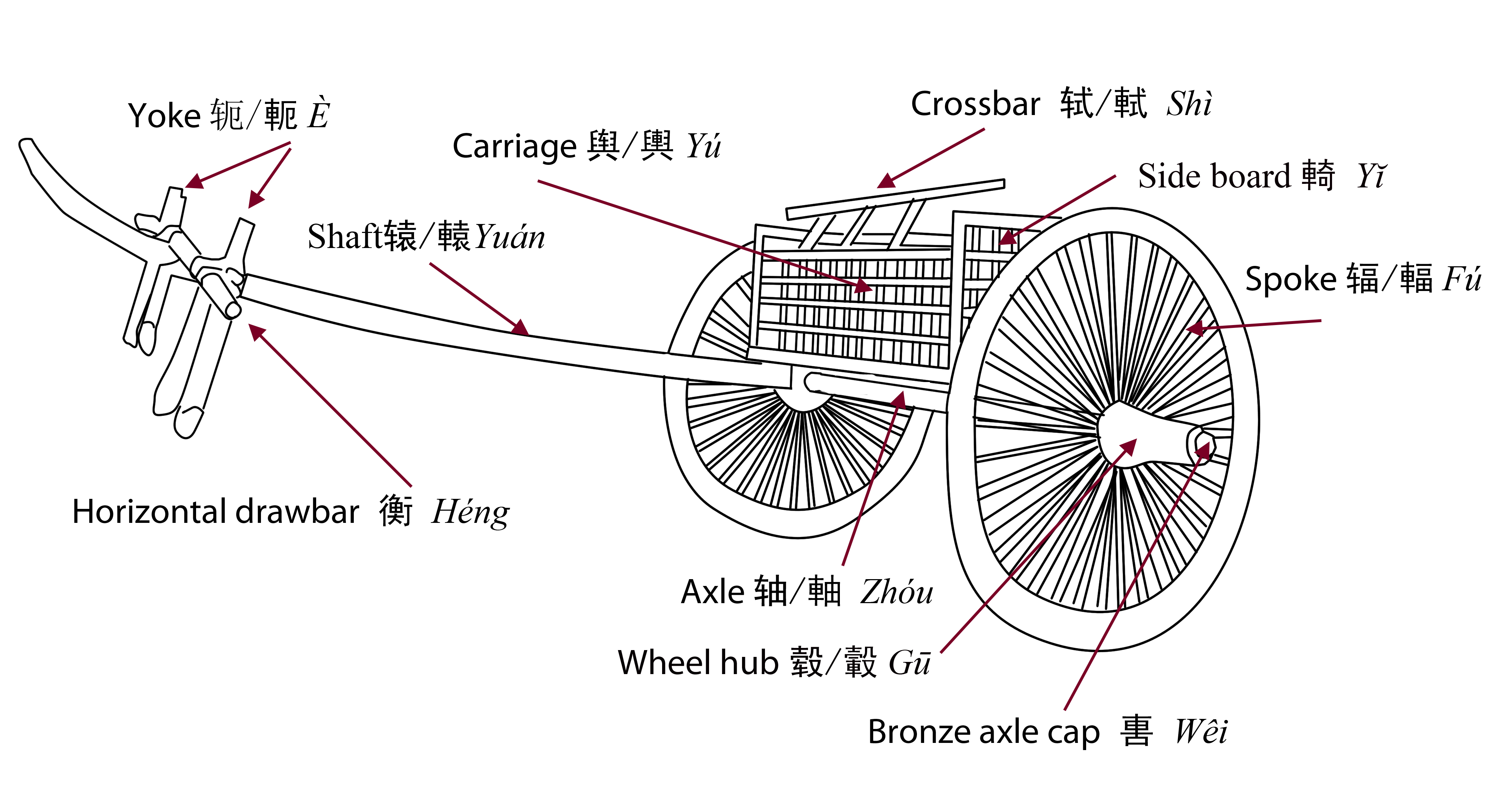
Chinese wooden chariot (shown without horse(s), which would have been hitched between the two rails, facing forward to the left).

With some exceptions, the propulsive power of chariots was traditionally by horses (or, maybe, ponies, in the earlier days). The wooden chariot has been claimed to have been first constructed by Jiguang, son of Xizhong, son of Fanyu, son of Yinliang, son of Yuhao, son of Di Jun (Yang, 2005: p. 98) (who may or may not have been the same as Di Ku).

=== King Mu's trip ===
A famous chariot trip was that of King Mu of Zhou of whom was told the Tale of King Mu, Son of Heaven, a marvelous chariot ride with divine steeds pulling the chariot on his visit to Kunlun on his visit to the Queen Mother of the West, Xi Wangmu.

== Chinese unicorn (Qilin) ==
Many translations from Chinese into English involve the translation of the Chinese qilin as "unicorn". However, the "Chinese unicorn" is more of a type of deer, than it is a type of horse. Taxonomically, the qilin would appear to be a one-horned ungulate; although, without information on whether the qilin, or lin, had, for example, an odd or even number of toes, the classification, in this regard, may remain moot, from a modern biological perspective. Nevertheless, and contextually, the Chinese characters used in sources strongly suggest that the "Chinese unicorn" was in no way considered to be a "horse".

Shanhaijing (117) also mentioned Bo-horse (Chinese: 駮馬; pinyin: bómǎ), a chimera horse with ox tail, single horn, white body, and its sound like person calling. The creature is lived at Honest-head Mountain. Guo Pu in his jiangfu said that Bo-horse able to walk on water. Another similar creature also mentioned in Shanhaijing (80) to live in Mount Winding-Centre as Bo (Chinese: 駮; pinyin: bó), but with black tail, tiger's teeth and claws, and also devour leopards and tigers.

== See also ==
=== General ===
- Horse symbolism
- Horses in East Asian warfare
- Chinese folklore
- Chinese folk religion
- Chinese literature
- Chinese mythology
- List of Chinese terrestrial ungulates
- Horses in Chinese culture

=== More specific ===
- Bole (mythology): also known as Bo Le, a legendary horse fancier and charioteer (Hawkes, 322)
- Buraq: flying equine or horse-like steed
- Chollima: Qianlima, thousand league horse
- Flying Horse of Gansu: well-known flying horse statue
- Horse burial in Chinese culture: archeological information
- Kanthaka, legendary Buddhist white horse
- Pegasus: a comparative Greek flying horse
- Red Hare: war horse of Lü Bu
- Tale of King Mu, Son of Heaven: whose 8 (Schafer, 59-60) mighty chariot horses enabled his trip to the West to visit the Queen Mother (Wangmu)
- War of the Heavenly Horses: in which history intersects with the legendary Central Asian horses
- When a white horse is not a horse: a question in Chinese philosophy
- White Horse Temple: thought to be the oldest Buddhist temple in China
- Zaofu: another legendary person who worked with horses
- Zhang Qian: a real life explorer, on a tianma mission
