= Military ranks of the Qing dynasty =

The Military ranks of the Qing dynasty were the military insignia used by the Military of the Qing dynasty, until the abdication of the Xuantong Emperor.

== Army ranks ==
The Army of the Qing dynasty has two different types of army structures: the early military system of the Eight Banners and the New Army, a later system based on Western standards.

=== Eight Banners ranks ===
The Eight Banners armies used what is known as "Mandarin squares" to denote rank.

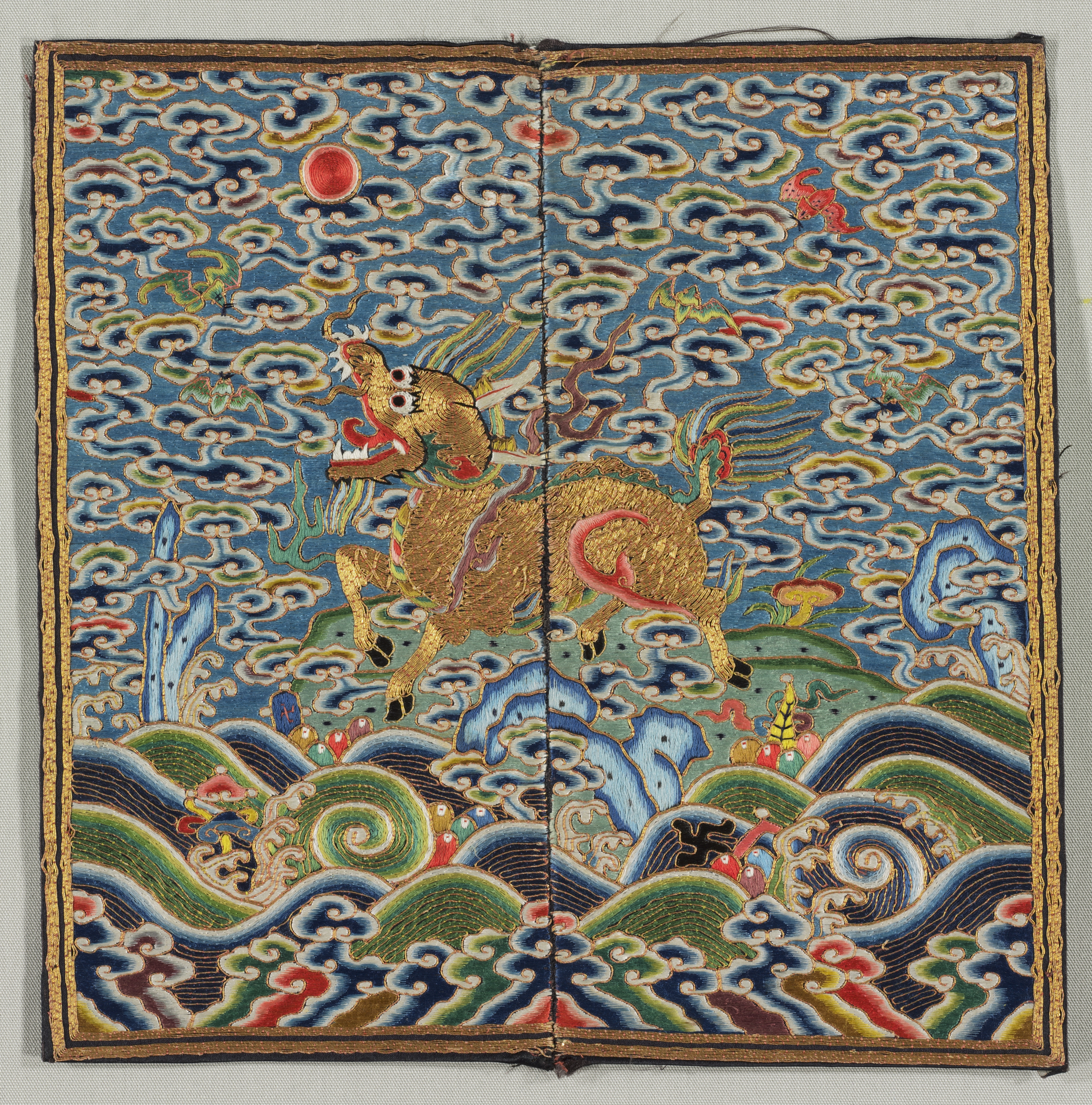
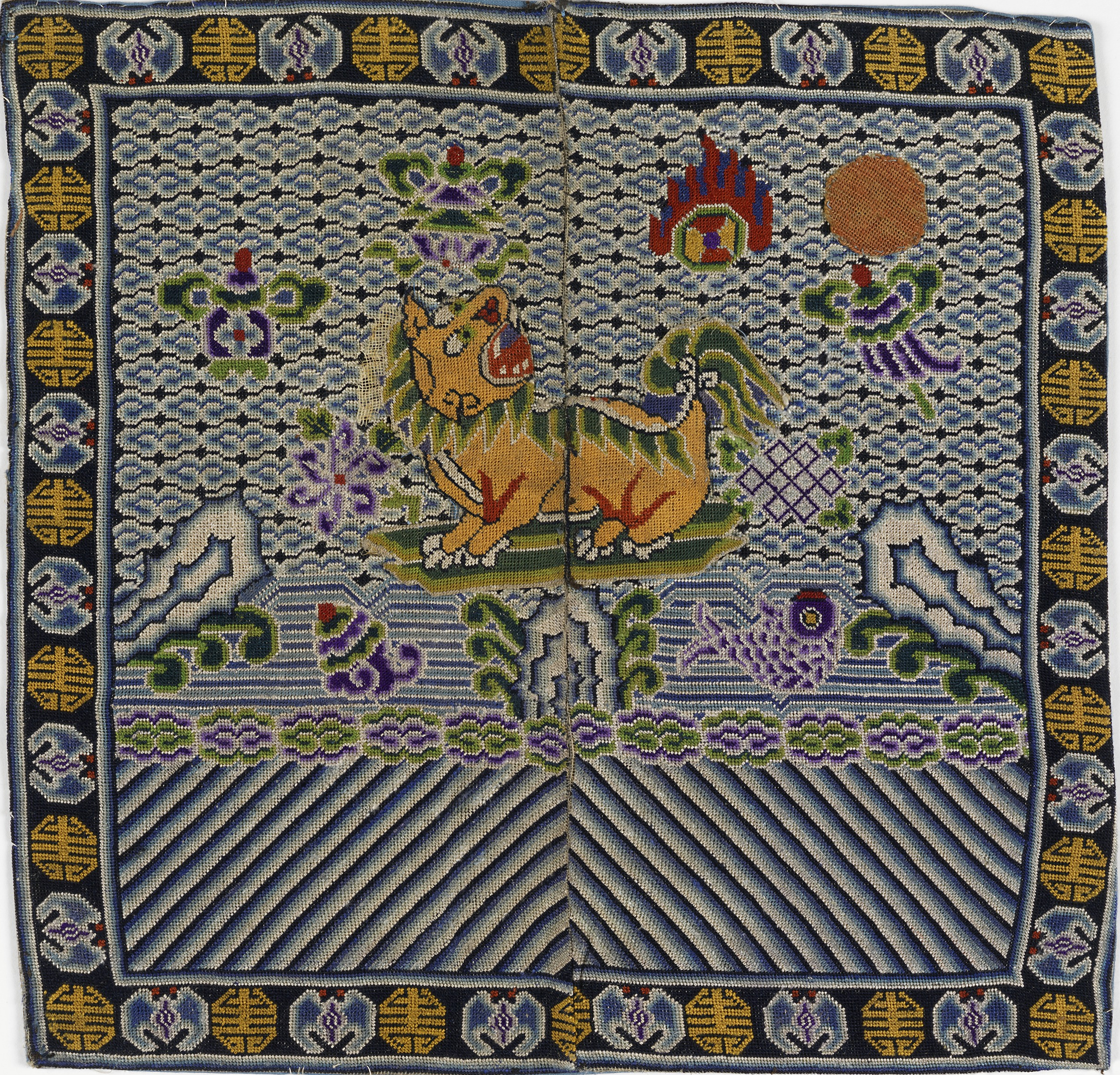
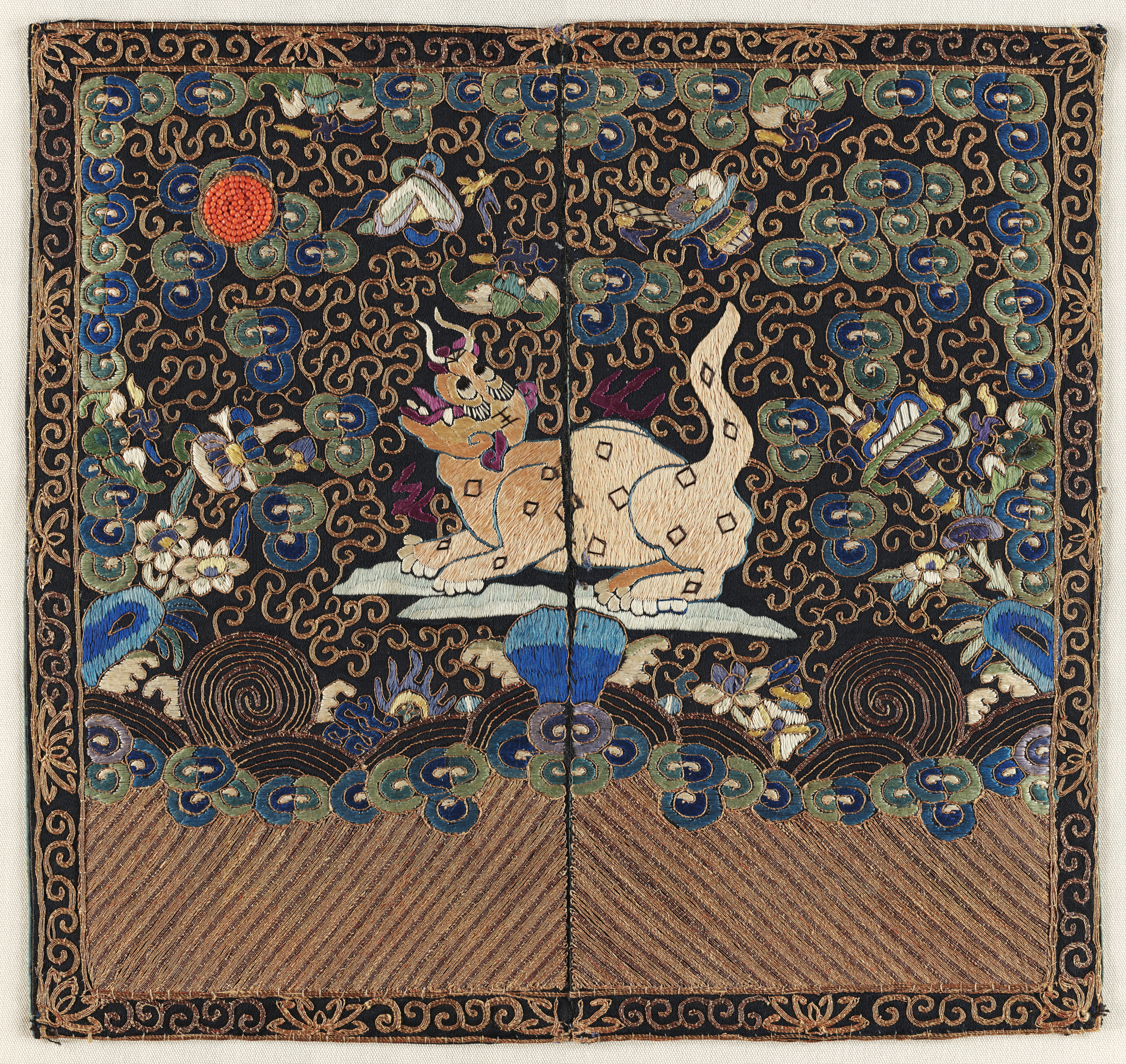
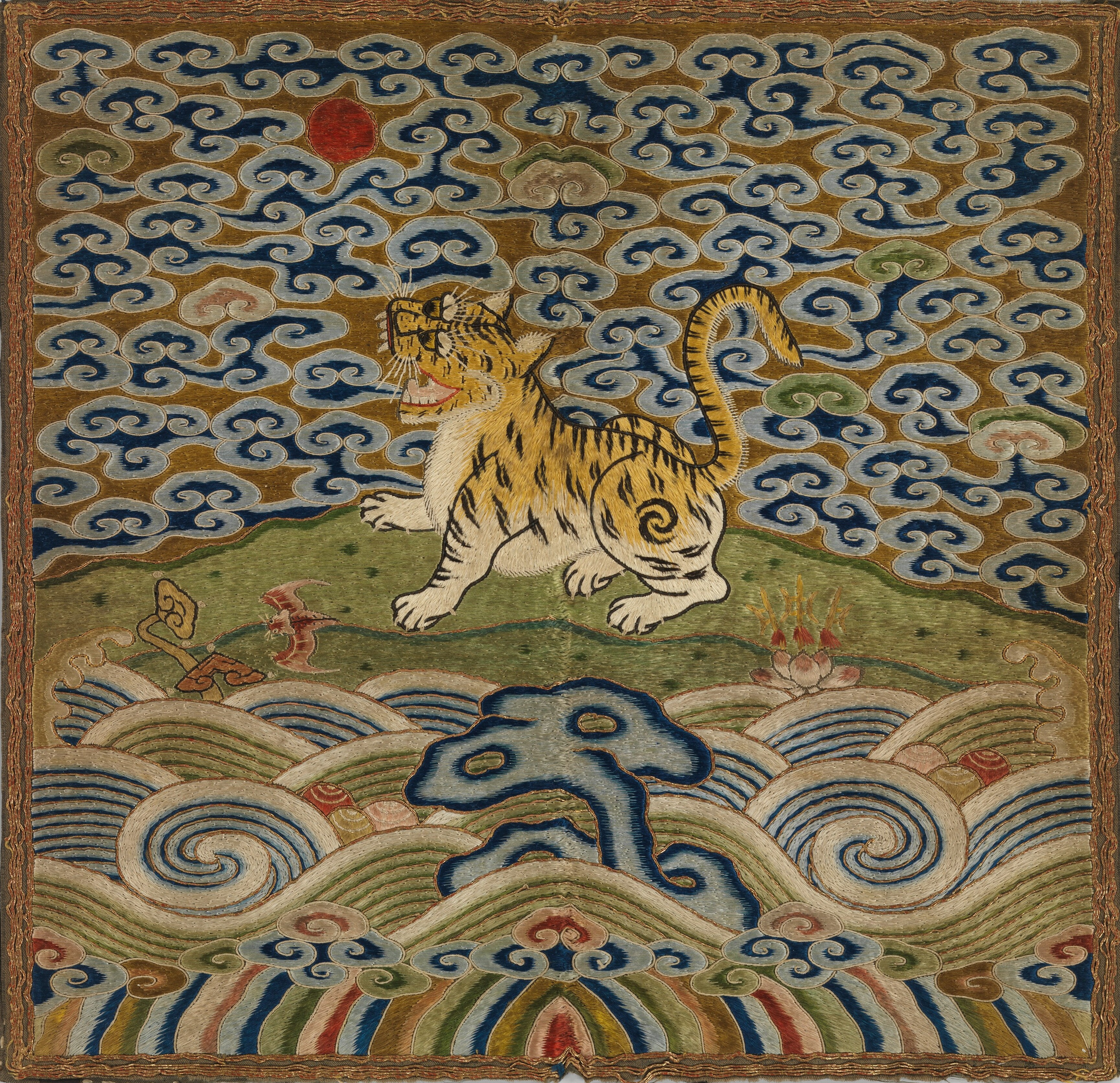
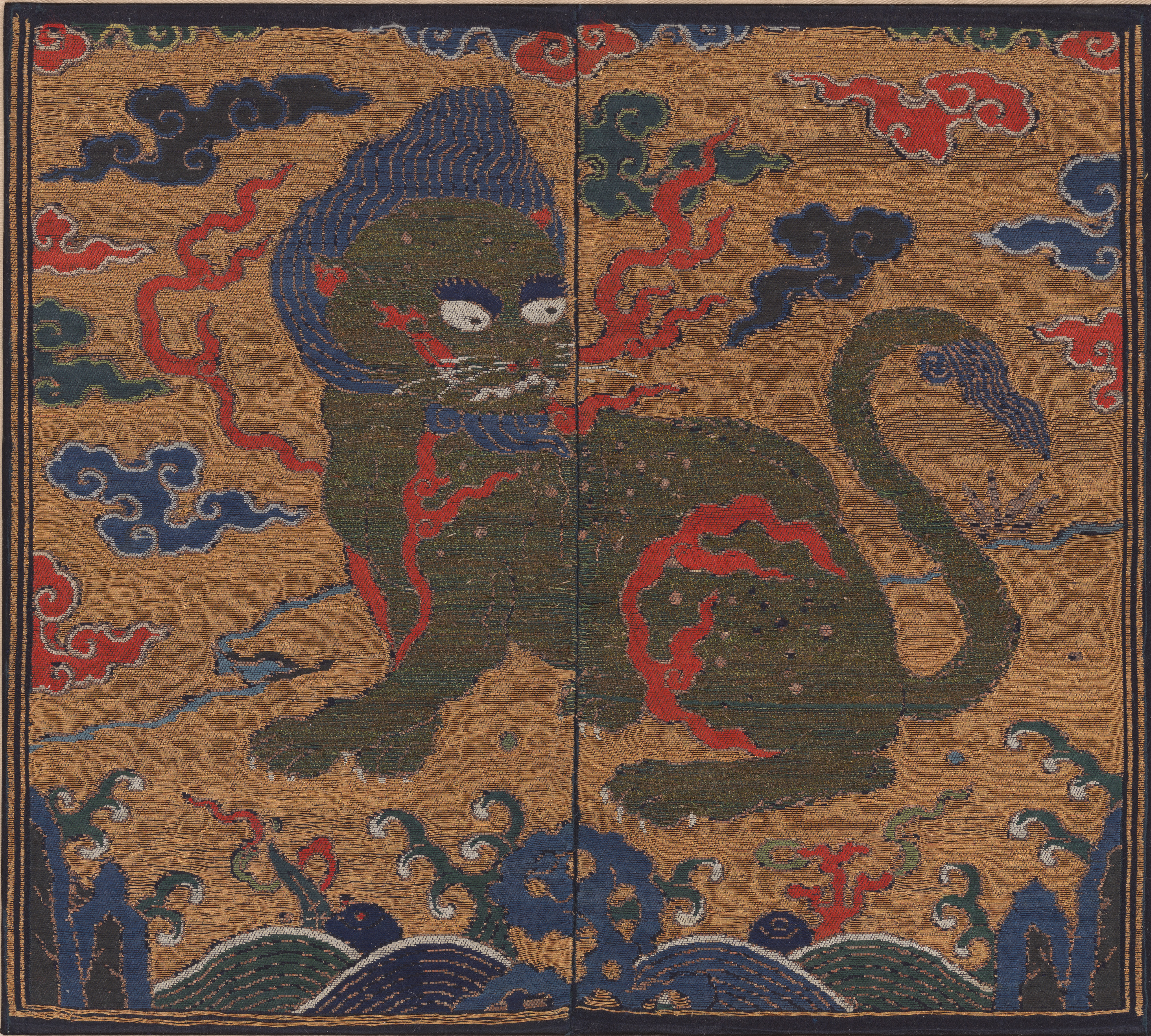
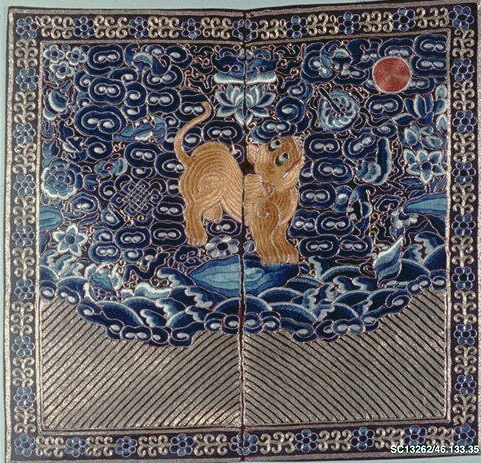
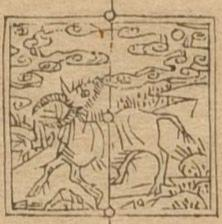
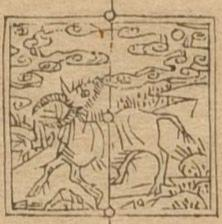
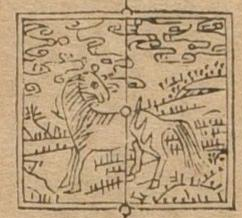
Animal	Qilin	Lion	Leopard	Tiger	Bear	Panther	Rhino	Rhino	Sea horse
1759–1912
1759–1912	一品; Yīpǐn	二品; Èrpǐn	三品; Sānpǐn	四品; Sìhpǐn	五品; Wǔpǐn	六品; Liùpǐn	七品; Qīpǐn	八品; Bāpǐn	九品; Jiǒupǐn
Translation	First-rank	Second-rank	Third-rank	Fourth-rank	Fifth-rank	Sixth-rank	Seventh-rank	Eighth-rank	Ninth-rank

=== New Army ===
==== Commissioned officer ranks ====
The rank insignia of commissioned officers.

Rank group	General / flag officers			Senior officers			Junior officers
1904–1910
1904–1910	上等第一级; Shàngděng dì yījí	上等第二级; Shàngděng dì èrjí	上等第三级; Shàngděng dì sānjí	中等第一级; Zhōngděng dì yījí	中等第二级; Zhōngděng dì èrjí	中等第三级; Zhōngděng dì sānjí	次等第一级; Cìděng dì yījí	次等第二级; Cìděng dì èrjí	次等第三级; Cìděng dì sānjí
1911–1912
1911–1912	上等第一级; Shàngděng dì yījí	上等第二级; Shàngděng dì èrjí	上等第三级; Shàngděng dì sānjí	中等第一级; Zhōngděng dì yījí	中等第二级; Zhōngděng dì èrjí	中等第三级; Zhōngděng dì sānjí	次等第一级; Cìděng dì yījí	次等第二级; Cìděng dì èrjí	次等第三级; Cìděng dì sānjí

==== Other ranks ====
The rank insignia of non-commissioned officers and enlisted personnel.

Rank group	Non-commissioned officers			Soldiers
1904–1910
1904–1910	上士 Shàngshì	中士 Zhōngshì	下士 Xiàshì	正兵 Zhèngbīng	一等兵 Yīděngbīng	二等兵 Èrděngbīng
1911–1912
1911–1912	上士 Shàngshì	中士 Zhōngshì	下士 Xiàshì	正兵 Zhèngbīng	一等兵 Yīděngbīng	二等兵 Èrděngbīng

=== Imperial Guards ===
The rank insignia of Imperial Guards officers.

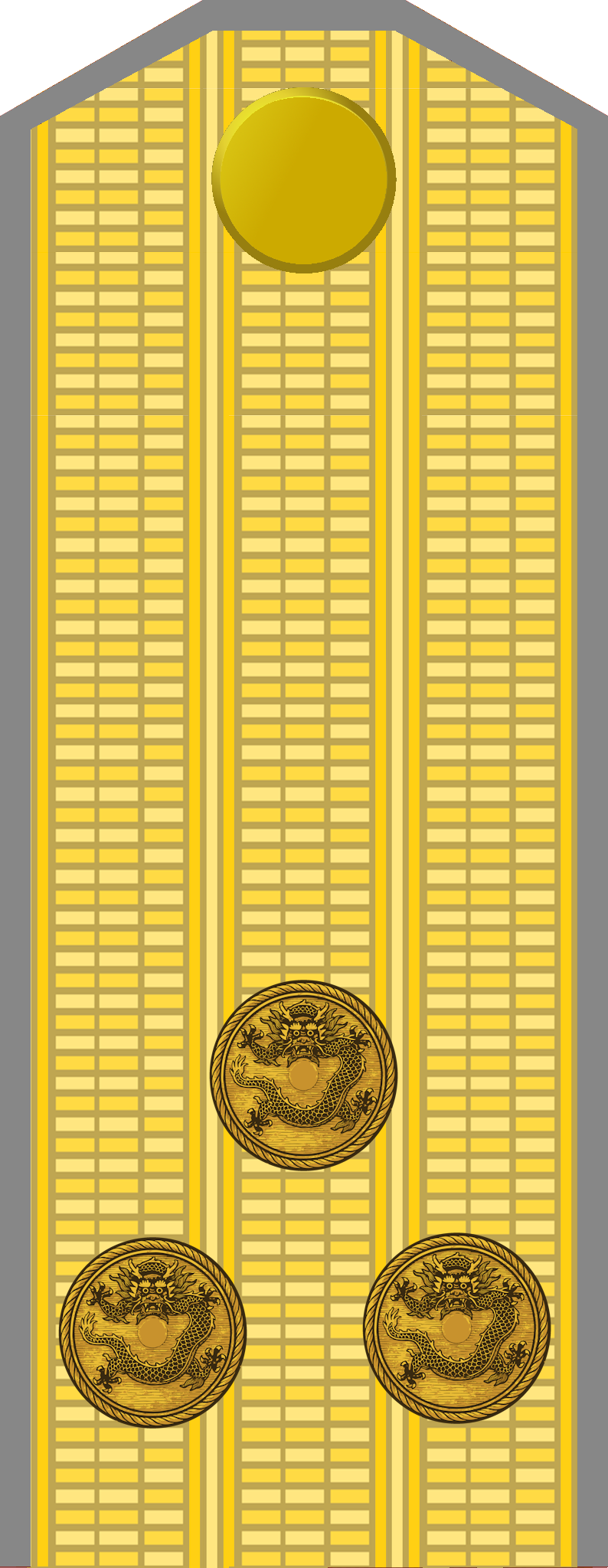
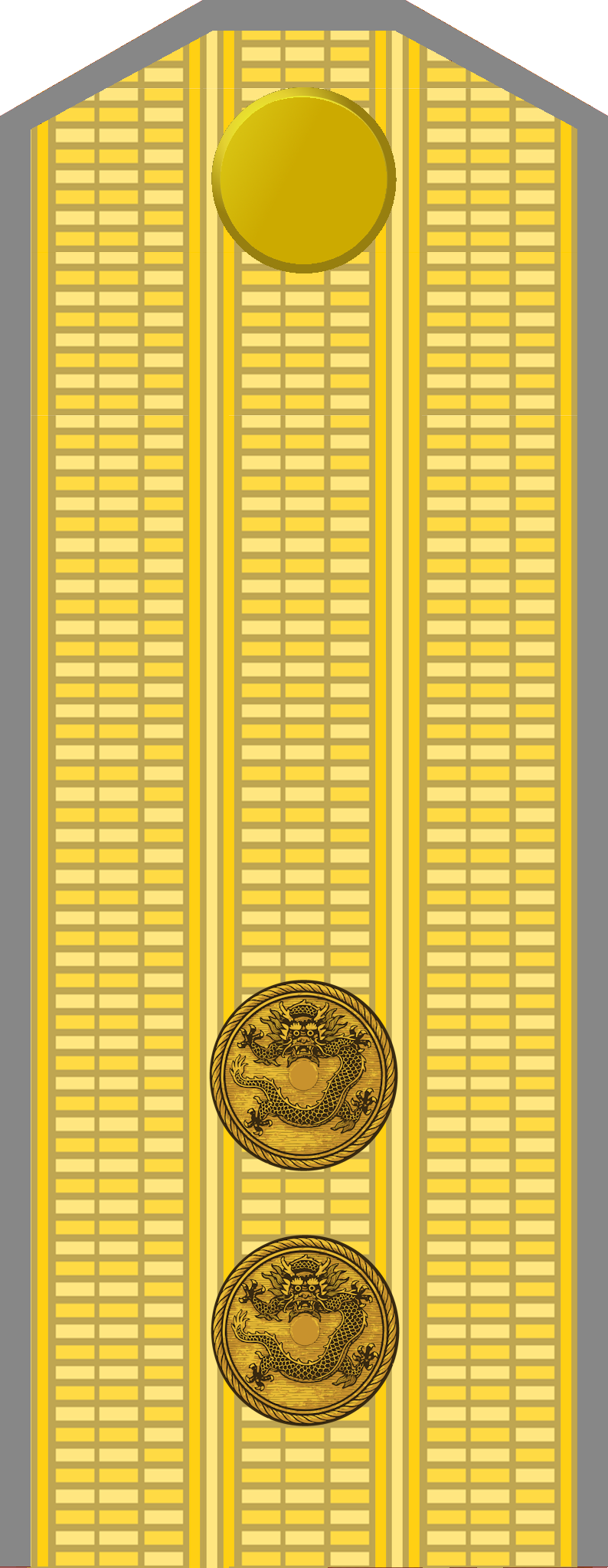
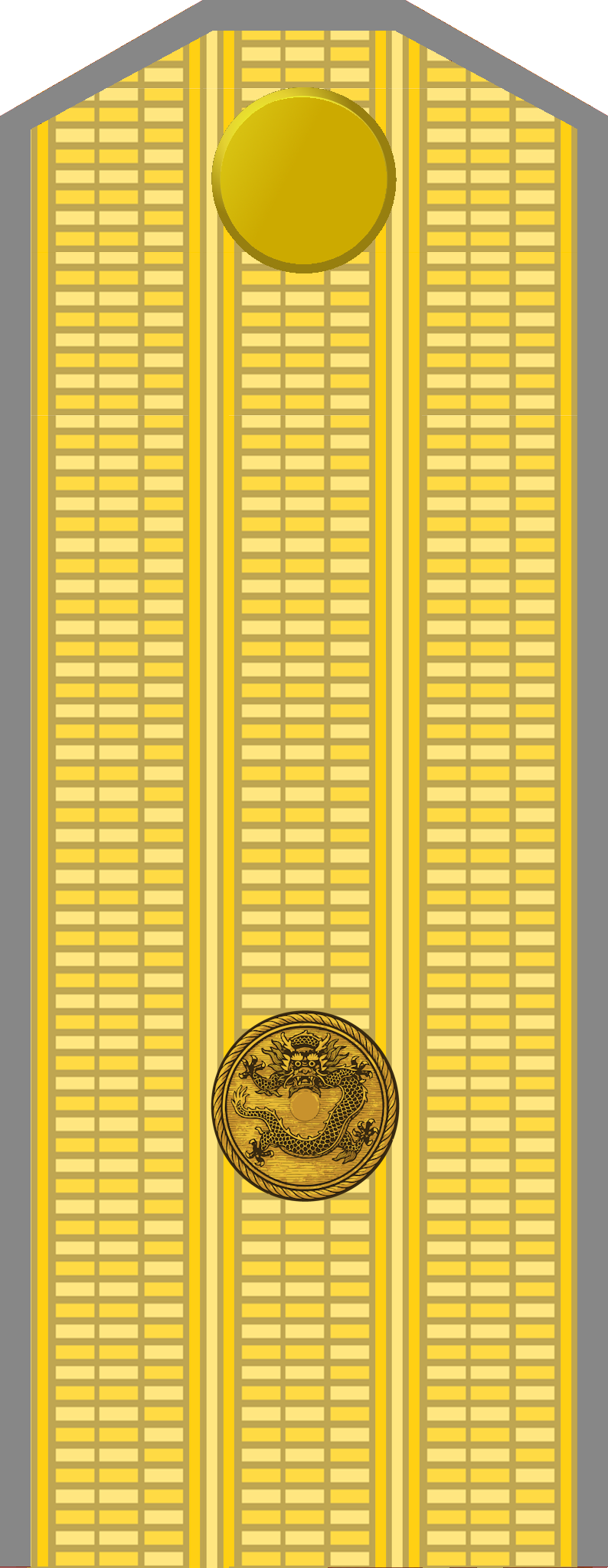
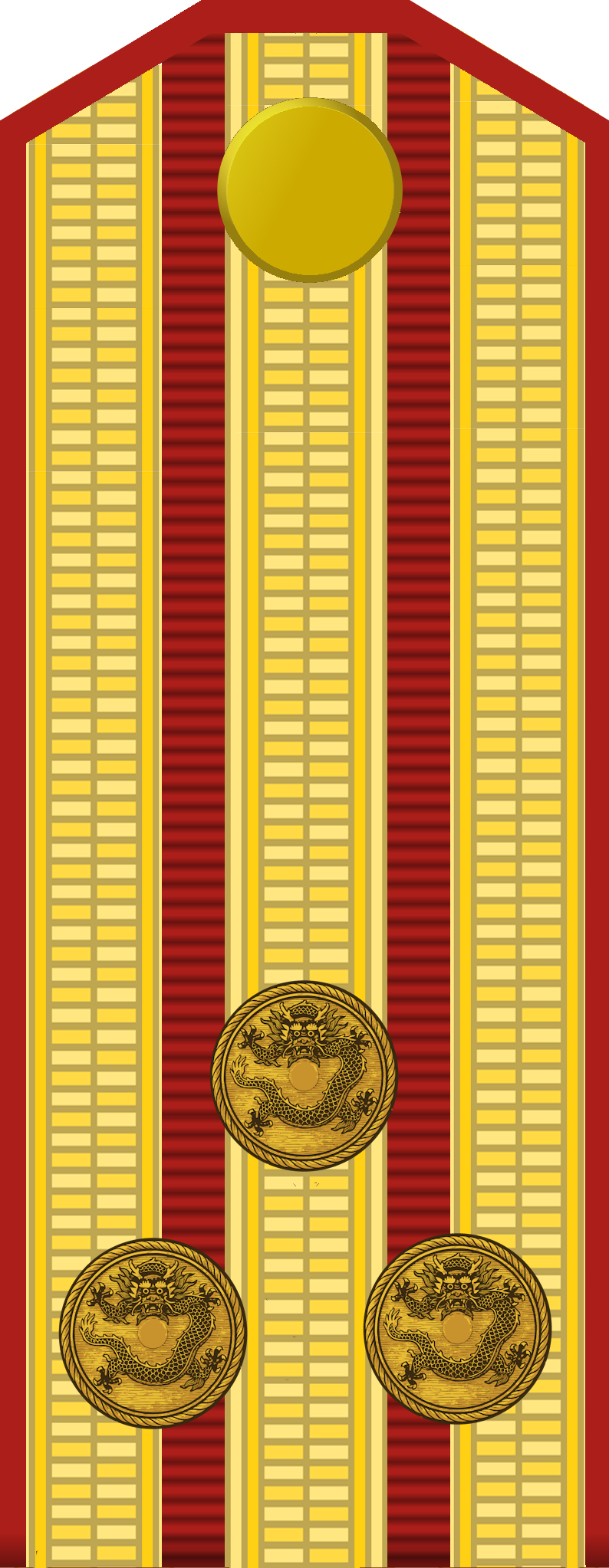
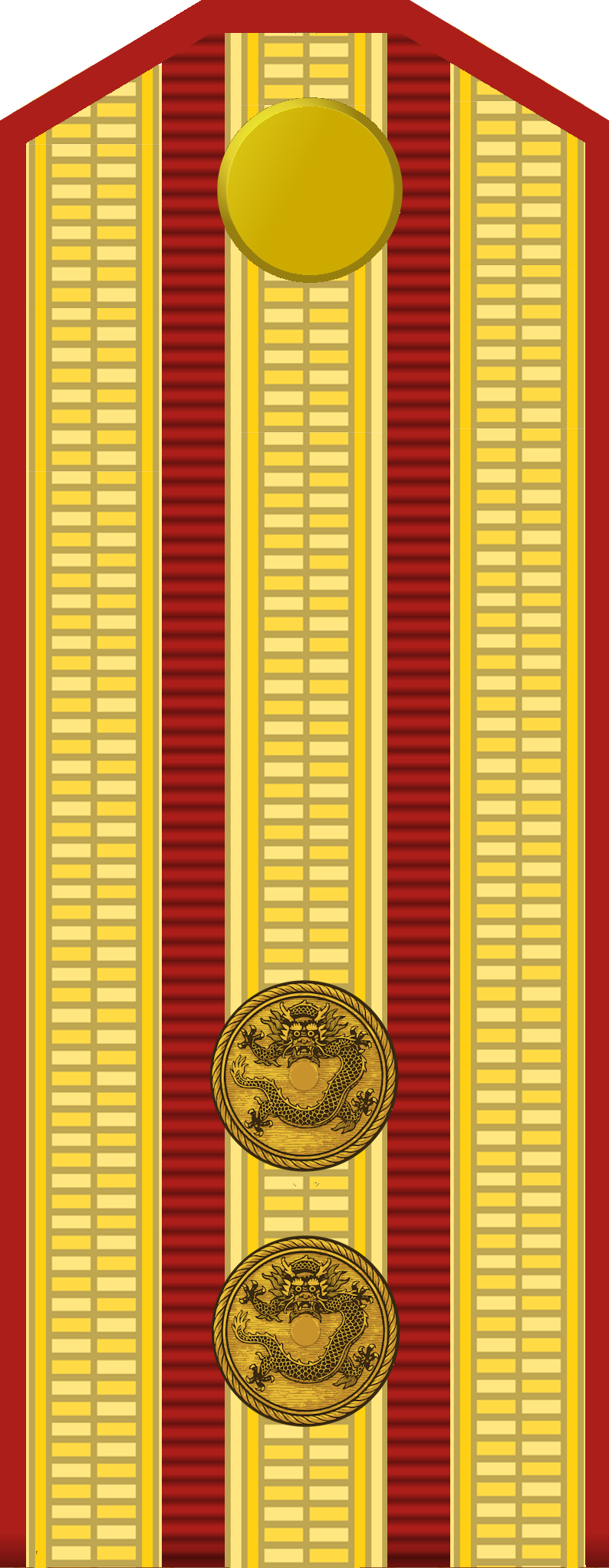
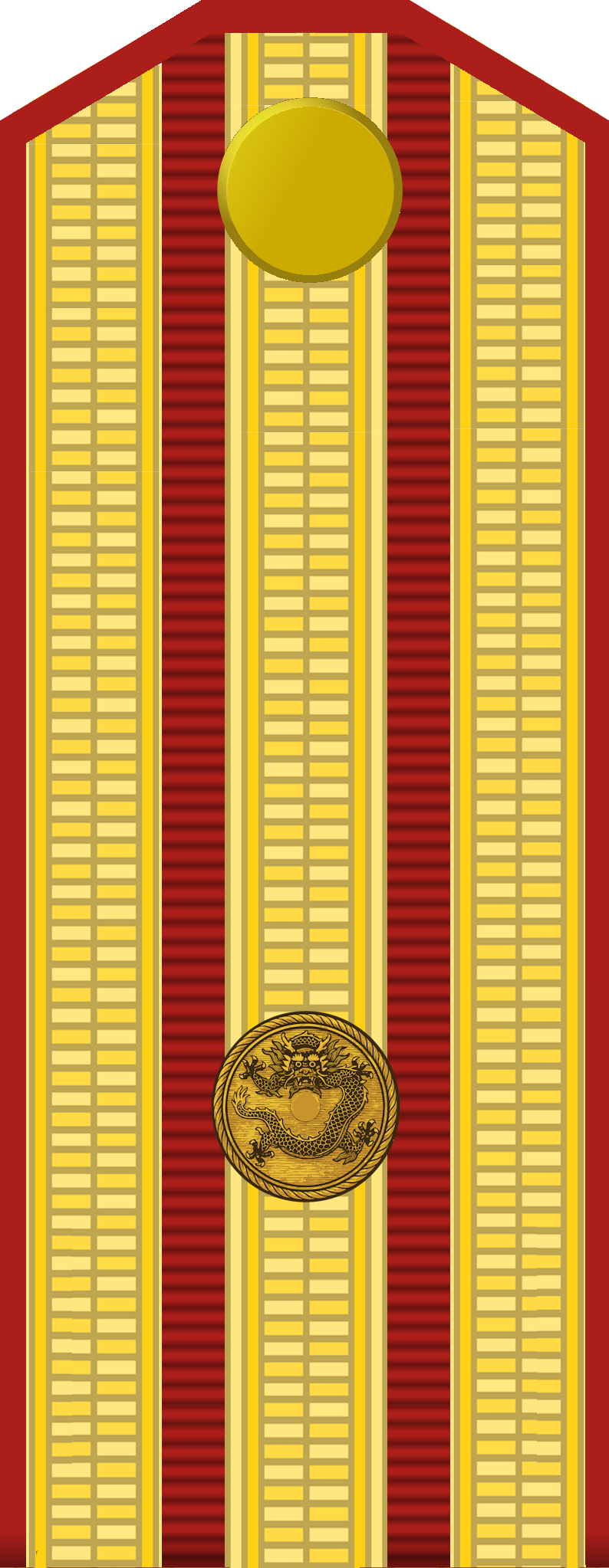
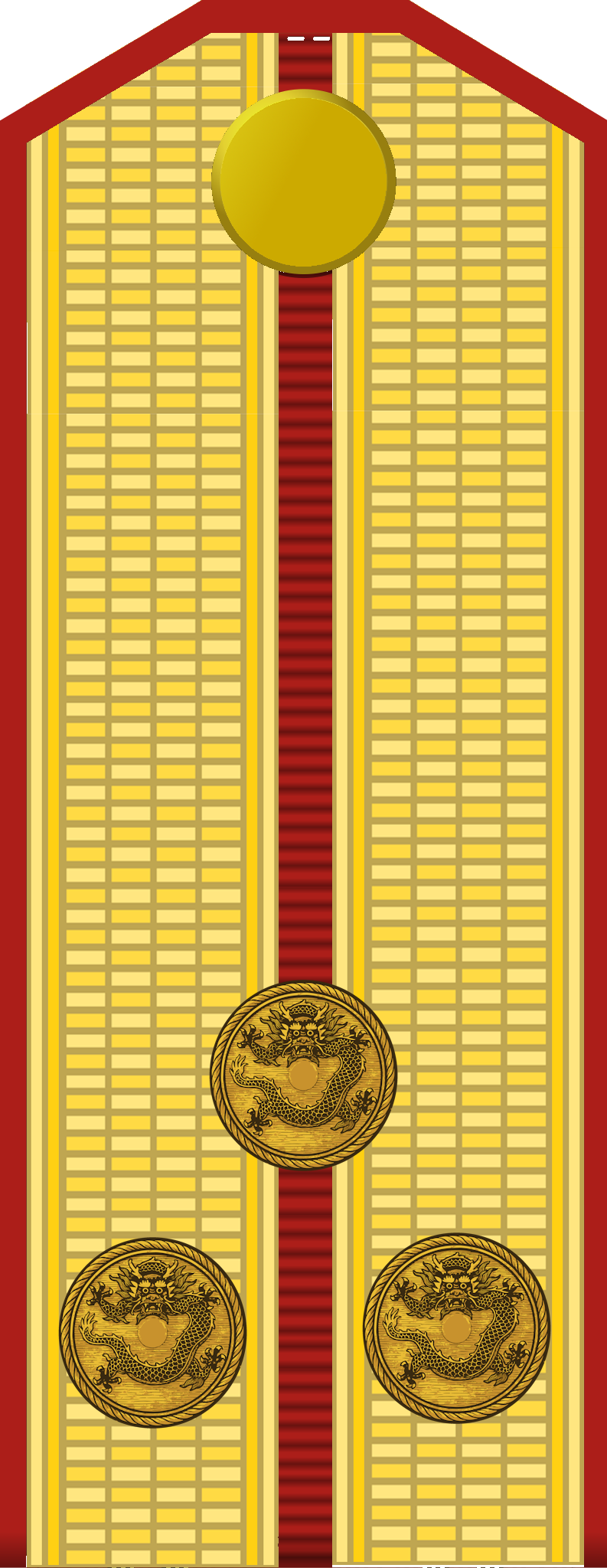
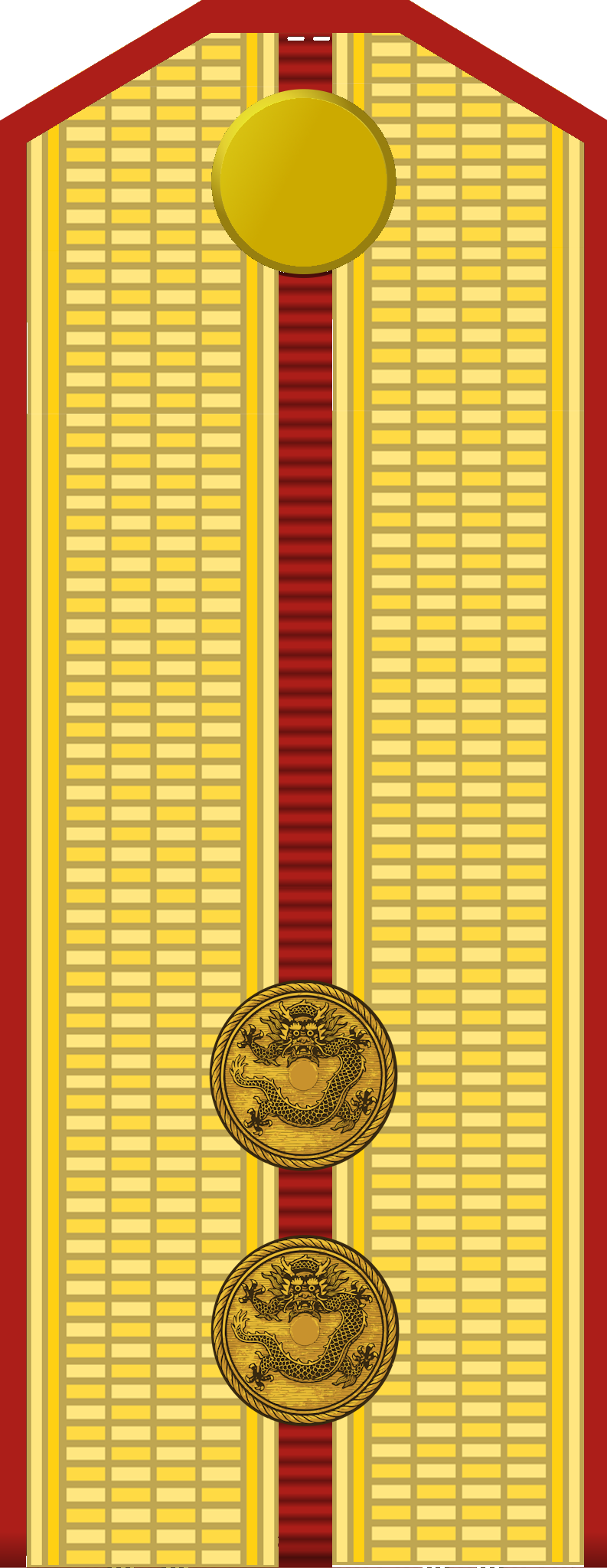
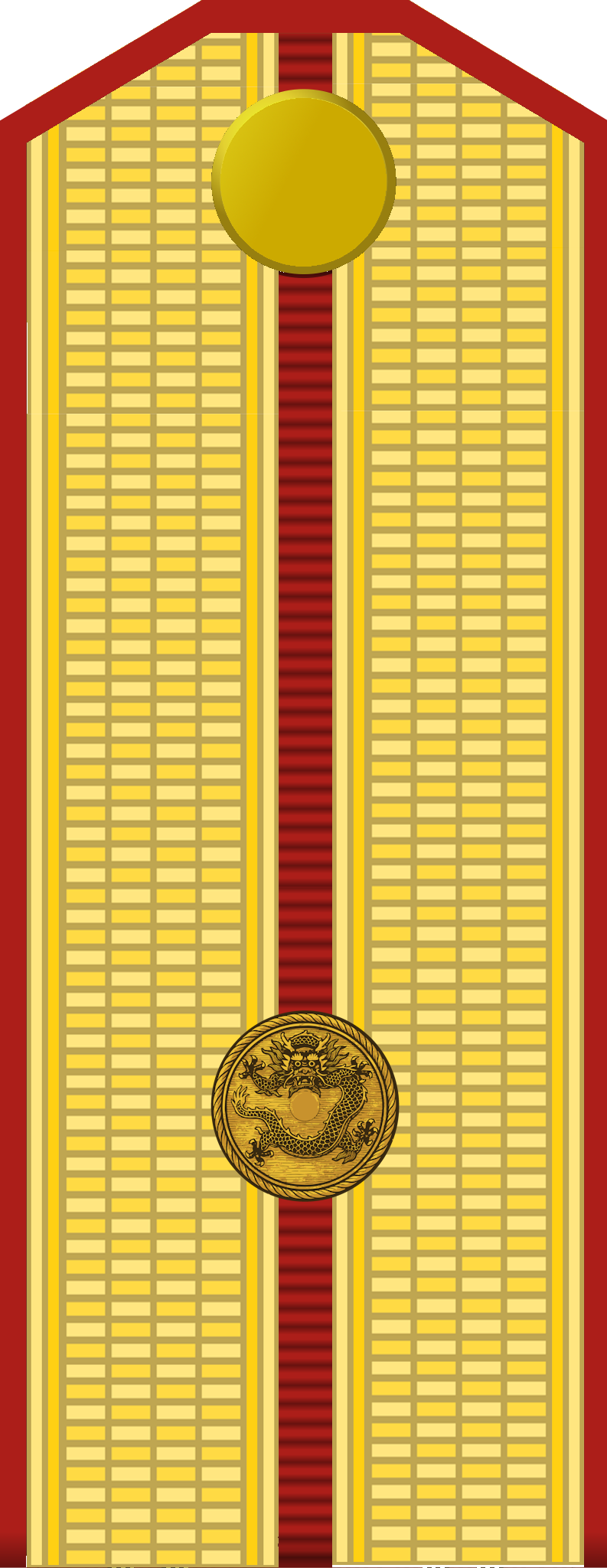
Rank group	General / flag officers			Senior officers			Junior officers
1909–1912
1909–1912	上等第一级; Shàngděng dì yījí	上等第二级; Shàngděng dì èrjí	上等第三级; Shàngděng dì sānjí	中等第一级; Zhōngděng dì yījí	中等第二级; Zhōngděng dì èrjí	中等第三级; Zhōngděng dì sānjí	下等第一级; Xiàděng dì yījí	下等第二级; Xiàěng dì èrjí	下等第三级; Xiàěng dì sānjí

== Navy ranks ==
=== Commissioned officer ranks ===
The rank insignia of commissioned officers.

Rank group	General / flag officers			Senior officers			Junior officers
1882–1912
1882–1912	一等第一级; Yīděng dì yījí	一等第二级; Yīděng dì èrjí	一等第三级; Yīděng dì sānjí	二等第一级; Èrděng dì yījí	二等第二级; Èīděng dì èrjí	二等第三级; Èīděng dì sānjí	三等第一级; Sānděng dì yījí	三等第二级; Sānděng dì èrjí	三等第三级; Sānděng dì sānjí

==== Rank flags ====
Flag			
Rank	一等第一级; Yīděng dì yījí	一等第二级; Yīděng dì èrjí	一等第三级; Yīděng dì sānjí

== See also ==
- Military ranks of the Republic of China (1912–1949)
