= Ji Xiang =

Ji Xiang may refer to:

- Duke Gong of Cao (died 618 BC), personal name Ji Xiang
- Ji Xiang (footballer) (born 1990), Chinese footballer
