= King Mu =

King Mu may refer to these monarchs:

- King Mu of Zhou (died 922 BC)
- King Mu of Chu (died 614 BC)
- Mu of Baekje (580–641), king of Baekje

== See also ==
- Duke Mu (disambiguation)
