= Bo Le =

Chinese horse tamer and hero in East Asian legend

Sun Yang (traditional Chinese: 孫陽; simplified Chinese: 孙阳; pinyin: Sūn Yáng; Wade–Giles: Sun^{1} Yang^{2}), better known by the honorific name Bole or Bo Le (Po-le; traditional Chinese: 伯樂; simplified Chinese: 伯乐; pinyin: Bólè; Wade–Giles: Po^{2}-le^{4}) was a horse tamer in Spring and Autumn period, a retainer for the Duke Mu of Qin (r. 659–621 BCE), and a famous judge of horses. Bole was the legendary inventor of equine physiognomy ("judging a horse's qualities from appearance").

== Names ==
Sun Yang, with the surname Sun 孫 and given name Yang 陽 (of yin and yang), was renowned for his extraordinary understanding of horses. He was given the Chinese honorific name Bole, and is also known as Sun Bole.

Bo 伯 means "eldest" and le 樂 means "pleasure; happiness". Bole was a mythological figure who first tamed horses. His name was given to a star, from which he supervised the winged tianma ("heavenly horses"). Proposed locations of this star are with Zaofu 造父 (the legendary charioteer, see below) in Zeta Cephei within Cepheus (Chinese astronomy) or in the constellation Scorpius.

In Modern Standard Chinese, Bole figuratively means "good judge of [especially hidden] talent", from the chengyu idiom Bole-xiangma (伯樂相馬; 'Bole physiognomizing horse'). The Classical Chinese expression (from the Zhanguo Ce below) Bole yigu (Chinese: 伯樂一顧; lit. 'one glance from Bole') means "to instantly raise the ask price of something".

In Japanese, Bole is known by the name Hakuraku (伯楽), which is the On reading of the Chinese characters 伯樂, and which has become Japanese slang for a veterinarian.

The name Bo Le can also be romanized as Po-le or Po Lo.

== Historical context ==
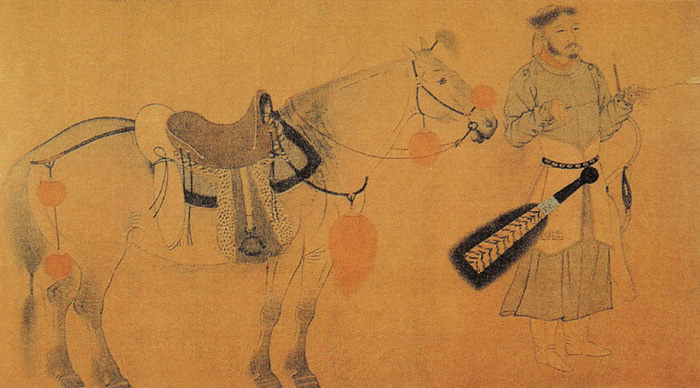
Painting of Archer and Horse attributed to Yelü Bei (899–937)

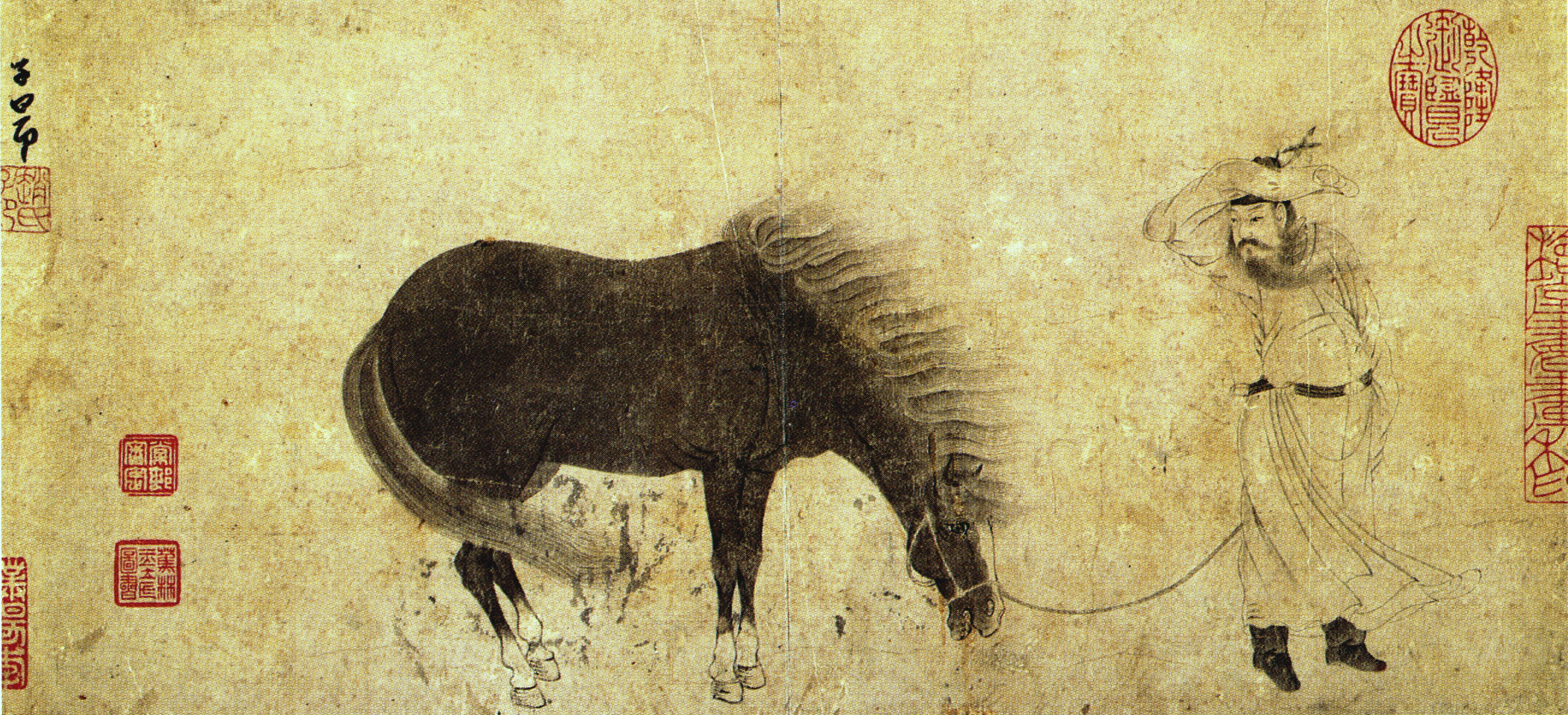
Drawing of Horse and Groom by Zhao Mengfu (1254–1322)

"Although his fame exceeded that of all others, Bole was only one of many horse experts active during the late Bronze Age". Owing to the importance of horse warfare in ancient China, equestrian experts were highly valued. The Lüshi Chunqiu listed ten specialized horse physiognomers, and Herrlee Glessner Creel said the "judging of horses was early recognized as a special art".

During the Shang dynasty (c. 1600–1046 BCE), Chinese armies first battled Eurasian nomadic warriors on horseback. Creel writes, "The riding horse was forced upon the Chinese. It was first thrust upon their attention as a new and deadly weapon that their nomadic enemies had acquired, and it seems always to have been regarded primarily as an instrument for fighting the nomads." The earliest archaeologically discovered Chinese chariot dated circa 1200 BCE during the reign of King Wu Ding. During the Zhou dynasty (1046–256 BCE), horse-drawn chariots were increasingly used both for warfare and aristocratic transportation. The first clear evidence of horse riding in China comes from the late 4th century BCE (Goodrich 1984). King Wuling of Zhao (r. 325–298 BCE) initiated the military reform of hufu qishe 胡服騎射 "barbarian clothing [i.e., belted pants] and horse archery", which replaced chariot tactics with superior cavalry tactics.

When the Chinese imported military horses and chariots from foreign "horse riders", they concurrently introduced a complex equestrian culture, which resulted in new professions in fields such as horse domestication, selective horse breeding (as early as the 14th century BCE), horse training, horse riding, horse tack, horse care, veterinary medicine, animal acupuncture and horse shamanism.

The Chinese traditionally believed the best horses and horse specialists came from foreign sources. While some people became outstanding equestrians, for Chinese people in general, Creel says, "the riding horse remained something strange, almost foreign in nature. Horses, and horsemen, were in general associated with the border areas of the north and west. It is a striking fact that the grooms and handlers of horses appearing in Chinese art seem almost always to be depicted as non-Chinese."

== Horse physiognomy ==
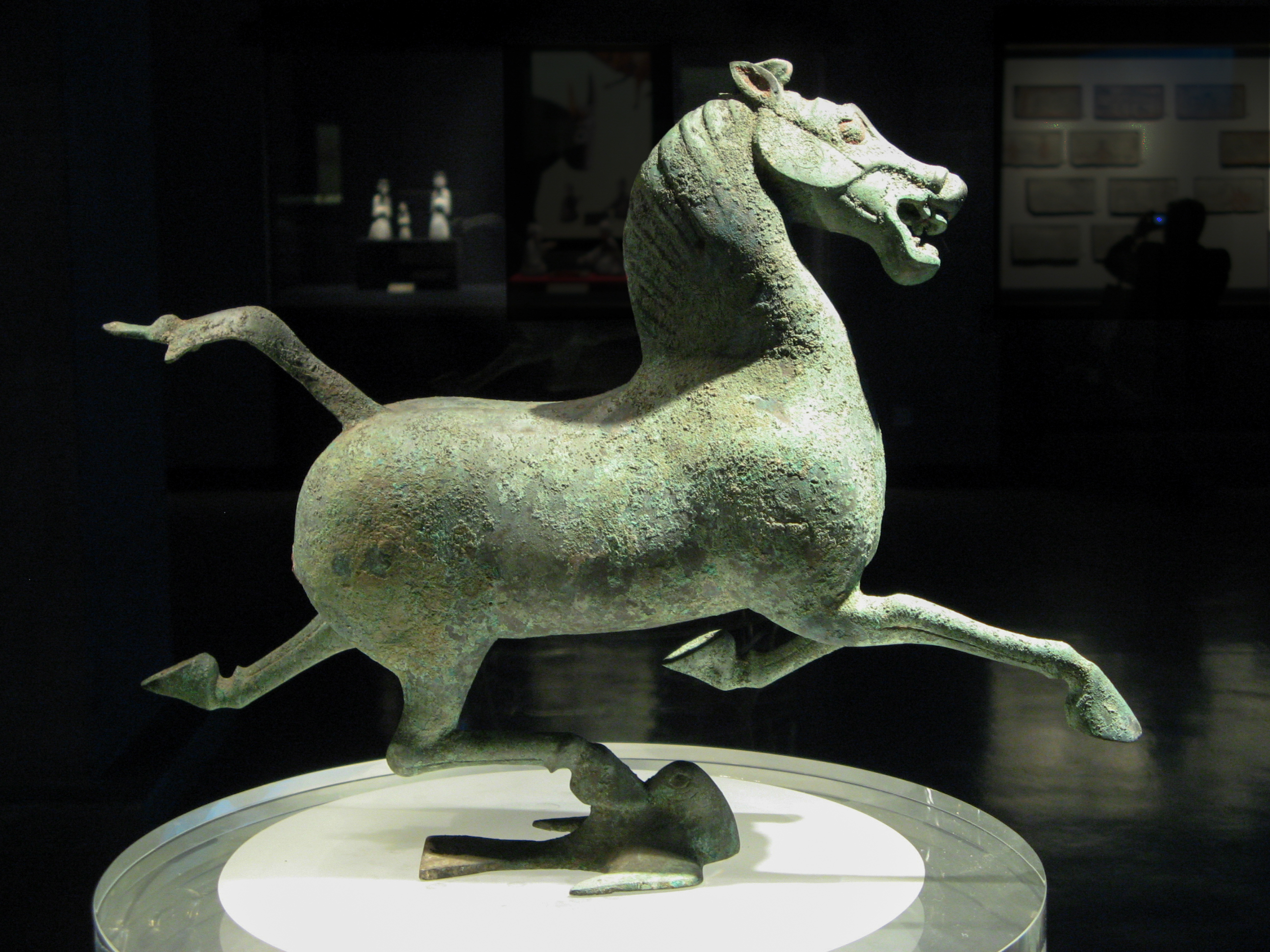
Eastern Han dynasty bronze of a physiognomically ideal "Flying Horse".

Techniques from the Chinese pseudoscience of xiangshu 相術 "human physiognomy; judgment of character from facial appearance" were extended to xiangma 相馬 "horse physiognomy; evaluating a horse by its appearance". (Sōma 相馬 is a common Japanese name.) Bole was specifically a xiangmashi 相馬師} "horse physiognomist", which Robert E. Harrist explains: "By studying the body of a horse, giving special attention to its bone structure and the sizes and shapes of its various parts, Bole was able to assess with unfailing accuracy hidden capacities that a lesser judge of horses would have overlooked."

In 1973, archeologists excavating a 168 BCE tomb in Changsha discovered the Mawangdui Silk Texts. They included a fragmentary text about judging horses, which scholars tentatively call the Xiangmajing 相馬經 "Classic of Horse Physiognomy" (also used for a 5th-century text). This manuscript mentions Bole himself; "What Bole physiognomized were the horses of a superior man. Yin and yang abided by the plumb line, and curved and straight were exactly even."

The (c. 544) Qimin yaoshu (Essential Techniques for the Common People) records early Chinese methods of agriculture and animal husbandry, including horse physiognomy. This text metaphorically associates parts of a horse's body with the political organization of a state, and describes the appearance of an ideal horse.

A horse's head is king; it should be square. The eyes are the prime ministers; they should be radiant. The spine is the general; it should be strong. The belly and chest are the city walls; they should be extended. The four legs are the local officials; they should be long. … In judging a horse one begins with the head. The head should be high and erect; it should look as if it were shaved. The head should be heavy, and it is good that there be little flesh, like the skinned head of a rabbit.

The Chinese historically used bronze scale models of horses as hippology reference guides to the ideal horse. The Book of the Later Han records two early examples. The horse expert Dongmeng Jing presented Emperor Wu of Han (r. 141–87 BCE) with a cast-bronze horse and written instructions for using the model to judge horses. General Ma Yuan (a renowned equestrian surnamed "horse") presented Emperor Guangwu of Han (r. 25–57 CE) a bronze model of a horse designed to clarify the points to observe in equine judging. The inscription, which listed four generations of Ma's horse teachers, said, "Horses are the foundation of military might, the great resource of the state." Some Chinese scholars propose that the famous "Flying Horse" discovered in a Han tomb in Gansu was a physiognomic model for a superior horse in motion.

Giambattista della Porta's 1586 De humana physiognomonia was an early Western parallel for horse physiognomy.

== Early textual references ==
Beginning around the 3rd century BCE, Chinese classics mention Bole as an exemplar of horse judging. Bole is frequently associated with the fabled qianlima 千里馬 "thousand-li horse", which was supposedly able to gallop one thousand li (approximately 400 km) in a single day (e.g., Red Hare). Qianlima was a literary Chinese word for people with latent talent and ability; and Spring suggests, "For centuries of Chinese history, horses had been considered animals capable of performing feats requiring exceptional strength and endurance. Possibly it is for this reason that from early times horses have been used allegorically to represent extraordinary people." Bole recognizing a qianlima was a metaphor for a wise ruler selecting talented shi "scholar-officials". Thus, "Geniuses in obscurity were called thousand li horses who had not yet met their [Bole]".

=== Lüshi Chunqiu ===
The (c. 239 BCE) encyclopedic Lüshi Chunqiu contrasts Bole with other legendarily skilled exemplars: the Spring and Autumn period (771–476 BCE) archer Yang Youji 養由基 and swordsmith Ouye, and the charioteer Zaofu who served King Mu of Zhou (r. 976–922 BCE).

When Yang Youji shot at a rhinoceros, he hit a stone instead and the arrow was swallowed, feathers and all. This happened because he was so intent on the rhinoceros. When Bole studied the physiognomy of horses, he saw nothing except horses. This was because he was so intent on horses.

Obtaining ten good horses is not as good as obtaining one excellent physiognomist of horses, like Bole, nor ten fine swords as good as one excellent smith, like Ouye, nor a thousand li of land as good as one sage.

As for a horse, if Bole physiognomized its quality and Zaofu held the reins, a worthy ruler riding as a passenger in a carriage drawn by it could go a thousand li in a single day. That such a ruler would expend none of the effort of the physiognomist and driver and yet enjoy the efficaciousness of the horse would be because he knows the principle of being a passenger.

Another Lüshi Chunqiu chapter lists ten specialist horse physiognomers.

Of those in antiquity who expertly physiognomized horses, Hanfeng Shi [寒風是] examined the teeth; Ma Chao [麻朝], the forehead; Zinu Li [子女厲], the eyes; Wey Ji [衛忌], the whiskers; Xu Bi [許鄙], the rump; Toufa He [投伐褐], the chest; Guan Qing [管青], the lips and throat; Chen Pei [陳悲], the legs and hooves; Qin Ya [秦牙], the front; and Zan Jun [贊君], the rear. All ten of these men were the most skilled of their age. How they examined horses was not the same, but each looked for characteristics that confirmed a horse's qualities. From this they could know whether the horse had superior or inferior joints, whether it would be clumsy or fleet of foot, whether it was made of sturdy or inferior stuff, and whether it was highly talented or not. It is not only the judging of horses that is like this. There are also confirming characteristics for people, as well as for deeds and states.

=== Hanfeizi ===
The (c. 3rd century BCE) Legalist classic Hanfeizi has two stories about Bole teaching horse physiognomy.

Pai-lo [sic] once taught two men how to select horses that kick habitually. Later, he went with them to Viscount Chien's stable to inspect the horses. One of the men pulled out a kicking horse. The other man went near behind the horse and patted its flank three times, but the horse never kicked. Therefore, the man who had pulled out the horse thought he had been wrong in the way of selection. Yet the other man said: "You were not wrong in the way of selection. The shoulders of this horse are short but its laps are swollen. The horse that kicks habitually has to raise the hindlegs and lay its whole weight upon the forelegs. Yet swollen laps are not dependable. So the hind legs cannot be raised. You were skillful in selecting kicking horses but not in observing the swollen laps." Verily, everything has the supporter of its weight. However, that the forelegs have swollen laps and therefore cannot support its whole weight, is known only by intelligent men. … Pai-lo taught men whom he disliked how to select swift race-horses and taught men whom he liked how to select inferior horses, because swift race-horses being few and far between would yield slow profits while inferior horses being sold every day would bring about quick profits.

=== Zhanguo ce ===
The (c. 3rd–1st centuries BCE) Zhanguo ce "Strategies of the Warring States" has two historical stories about Bole in which a courtier seeking an audience with a ruler compares himself to an excellent horse.

After waiting three months for an interview with Lord Chunshen (d. 238 BCE), the Prime Minister of Chu, Han Ming 汗明 told a story equating himself to a ji 驥 "thoroughbred horse; virtuous person" being recognized by Bole. The (c. 121 CE) Shuowen Jiezi dictionary defined ji 驥 (tr. Spring 1988:188) as "a thousand li horse that needs a Sun Yang (i.e., Po-le) to be recognized."

You have heard of the great stallion Chi, have you not?' asked Han Ming. When Chi was very old, he was harnessed to a salt cart to pull it up Mount Taihang, His hooves grew weak and his haunches trembled, his tail was soaked and his flanks drenched till sweat dripped to the ground and mingled with lather from his withers. Midway he came to a halt. He heaved on the shafts but could no longer climb. Po Lo came upon him there and leaping from his chariot he cradled (the horse's head) in his arms and wept. He took off his cape and covered the beast with it. Then Chi lowered his head and snorted, raised it and neighed with a sound that carried to the heavens—a sound as pure as chiming stones. And why? Because he saw that Po Lo truly knew him as he was.

Su Dai 蘇代 (a brother of Su Qin) from Yan wanted an audience with the King of Qi and requested Chunyu Kun 淳於髡, master of the Jixia Academy, to be an intermediary.

Once there was a merchant who was selling a very fine horse. For three whole days together he stood in the market place and no one paid him the least attention. Finally he went to Po Lo and said, "I have a superior beast I wish to sell, but I have stood in the market place for three whole days and no one has even remarked on the horse. I beg you, sir, to come and look him up and down, and when you leave, keep glancing back at him. For this I would like to give you a sum equal to my expenses for one day's market." Po Lo did look the horse over carefully, and as he left he glanced back at it. In a single morning offers for the horse increased tenfold. Now I want to "show a splendid steed" to the king and I have no one to introduce me. Would you be willing to be my Po Lo? I would like to make you a gift of a pair of white pi and a thousand measures of gold to defray the expenses of your horses' fodder.

The horse allegorizing Su Dai is called a junma 駿馬 "excellent horse; splendid steed", and Spring says Bole, "because of his ability to recognize merit, functions as a mediator."

=== Zhuangzi ===
Unlike most classical texts that praise Bole for skill in evaluating horses, the (c. 3rd century BCE) Daoist "Horses' Hooves" chapter of Zhuangzi blames him for going against the Dao of horses.

A horse's hooves can tread upon frost and snow, its hair can withstand the wind and the cold. It eats grass and drinks water; it prances about briskly. This is a horse's true nature. Though one might provide a horse with magnificent terraces and splendid bedrooms, they are of no use to it. But then came Poleh, who said, "I am skilled at training horses." And men began to singe them, clip their hair, trim their hooves, and brand them. They led them with bridles and hobbles, lined them up in stable and stall, resulting in the deaths of two or three out of ten. They made the horses go hungry and thirsty, raced them, and galloped them, arrayed them in rows and columns. In front were the tribulations of the bit and the ornamental halter, behind were the threats of the whip and the crop, resulting in the deaths of over half the horses. … Returning to the subject of horses, if they are allowed to live on the open land, they eat the grass and drink the water. When they are happy, they cross necks and rub against each other. When they are angry, they turn back to back and kick each other. The knowledge of horses amounts to this and no more. But you put a yoke upon them and array them evenly with moon-mirrors on their foreheads, all they know is to try to break the cross-bar, twist out of the yoke, smash the chariot cover, expel the bit, and bite through the reins. Therefore, to take the knowledge of a horse and make it behave like a brigand is the crime of Poleh.

=== Huainanzi ===
The (c. 139 BCE) eclectic compilation Huainanzi refers to Bole in four contexts, three of which are similar to the Lüshi Chunqiu. The first one mentions him with the charioteer Zaofu: "Zaofu could not be Bo Le. Each had articulated a single corner but did not comprehend the full domain of the myriad techniques." The second mentions another famous charioteer, Wang Liang 王良: "Thus is Bo Le selects the steeds and Wang Liang drives them, and enlightened ruler can ride without the trouble of selecting horses or driving and can undertake a journey of a thousand li. He is carried by the capabilities of others as if they were his feathers and wings." The third context lists the swordsmith Ouye with three above horse physiognomers: "Thus it is said, 'Obtaining ten sharp swords is not as good as attaining the skill of Ou Ye; obtaining one hundred fleet horses is not as good as attaining the arts of Bo Le' … The assessment methods of Bo Le, Han Feng, Qin Ya, and Guan Qing were all different, but their understanding of horses was as one."

The final Huainanzi context is a well-known story about Duke Mu of Qin, Bole, Bole's sons, and Jiufang Gao 九方皋.

Duke Mu of Qin addressed Bo Le saying: "You are getting on in years. Is anyone in your family who can take over for you and find me a good steed?" Bo Le replied; "A good horse may be judged by his physique, countenance, sinews, and bones. But in judging the best horse in the world, it seems as if it is not there at all, as if it has disappeared, as if it had lost its singular identity. A horse like that raises no dust and leaves no tracks. All my sons are lesser talents. They can judge a good horse, but they lack the talent to judge the best horse in the world. However, there is a man who is my porter and firewood gatherer who is called Nine-Cornered Hillock. In judging horses, he is not inferior to my abilities. I respectfully request that you grant him an audience." Duke Mu granted him an audience and commanded him to search out a fine steed. After three months Nine-Cornered Hillock returned and reported: "The horse has been located. It is in Shaqiu." Duke Mu replied: "What kind of horse is it?" "It is a yellow mare," answered Nine-Cornered Hillock. Thereupon Duke Mu sent men to Shaqiu to obtain the horse. The horse, however, turned out to be a black stallion. Duke Mu was quite displeased. Summoning Bo Le, he inquired of him saying: "What a loss! The man you sent to find me a good steed cannot distinguish the color of one coat from another nor a female from a male; what could he possibly know about horses?" Bo Le let out a long sigh and replied: "It always comes to this! This is precisely why he surpasses me by a thousand or ten thousand fold and is infinite in his capabilities. What Hillock observes is dynamism of Heaven. He recognizes the refined essence and discards the dross. He focuses on the internal and disregards the external. He looks at what is to be seen and does not look at what is not to be seen. He scrutinizes what is to be scrutinized and disregards what is not to be scrutinized. It appears that what he has judged is [a quality] more precious than just a horse." The horse arrived and ultimately proved to be an excellent horse. Therefore the Laozi says: "Great straightness is as if bent; great skill is as clumsy."

The (c. 3rd–4th century CE) Daoist Liezi (tr. Giles 1912:66) repeats this story about Bole recommending Jiufang Gao to Duke Mu. For comparison, "A good horse can be picked out by its general build and appearance. But the superlative horse—one that raises no dust and leaves no tracks—is something evanescent and fleeting, elusive as thin air."

Japanese legend retells a simplified version of this story, omitting Jiufang Gao, with Hakuraku (the Japanese name for Bole) dispatched by the Chinese Emperor with the task of locating the perfect horse. Hakuraku returns with news of a bay mare he had found. But when Imperial soldiers went to fetch the horse, they found it was a black stallion. The story illustrates the Confucian and Taoist adage that expert knowledge embodies the ability to see past appearances to the true nature of a subject.

=== Han Yu ===
The Tang dynasty poet Han Yu (768–824) wrote a well-known fable about Bole and qianlima.

Only when an era has a man like Po-le are there thousand-li horses. Thousand-li horses are common, but Po-les, on the other hand, are rare. Thus even though there may be famous horses, they only become abused under the hand of the man to whom they are enslaved, and they die in the stables—never having been recognized as thousand-li horses. Thousand-li horses at times consume a whole dan [approximately 60 kg] of grain in one feeding. If the one who feeds them does so without knowing they are capable of a thousand-li, then even though they may have the ability to go so far, they, having not eaten their fill, are lacking in strength, and their talent and beauty are not apparent. Moreover, if one wanted to rank them with regular horses, they would not make the grade. How then could they be asked to have the ability of going a thousand li? They are whipped inappropriately and fed in such a way that they cannot fulfil their innate talents. Yet when they cry out, they cannot be understood. With whip in hand the man approaches them and says, "There are not any good horses in the empire." Alas! Is it that there are really no good horses or is it perhaps that there is no one who really understands horses?

== Textual attributions ==
The name Bole occurs in titles of various Chinese books on equine medicine, but this does not mean Bole was the author. Imrie et al. write, "As was quite often the case in China, rather than revealing their own names, authors would publish their books under the name of famous historical or even legendary figures living centuries if not millennia earlier."

The oldest recorded books with Bole's name are listed in the (636 CE) Book of Sui bibliographic section on veterinary texts. Two are noted as lost after the Liang dynasty (502–577): Bole xiangma jing 伯樂相馬經 "Bole's Classic of Horse Physiognomy" and Bole liaoma jing 伯樂療馬經 "Bole's Classic on Treatments for Horses". The third veterinary text was extant during the Sui dynasty (578–618): Bole zhima zabing jing 伯樂治馬雜病經 "Bole’s Classic on Curing the Various Illnesses of Horses".

Chinese legends associate Bole with the origins of animal acupuncture for horses. For instance, "Another famous veterinarian, Sun Yang, alias Baile, wrote Baile Zhen Jing (Baile's Canon of Animal Acupuncture) at the time of Qin Mu-Gong (659–621 BC)." The 1385 Simu anji ji 司牧安驥集 (Horse-herder's Collection of Ways to Pacify Thoroughbreds) cites a Bo Le zhen jing 伯樂針經 (Bole's Classic of Needling/Acupuncture), but the title word zhen 針 "needle; pin" can mean either "needling (to lance boils, etc.)" or "acupuncture." Imrie et al. conclude there is no reason to associate the Bole zhen jing with acupuncture because the Simu anji ji and other early veterinary texts clearly used zhen to mean "cauterization or phlebotomy".

== See also ==
- Horse in Chinese mythology
