= Duke Ping =

Duke Ping may refer to:

- Duke Ping of Chen (died 755 BC)
- Duke Ping of Jin (died 532 BC)
- Duke Ping of Cao (died 524 BC?)
- Duke Ping of Qi (died 456 BC)
