= Duke Dao =

Duke Dao may refer to these rulers of ancient China:

- Duke Dao of Jin (586–558 BC)
- Duke Dao of Cao (fl. 6th century BC)
- Duke Dao of Qi (died 485 BC)
- Duke Dao of Qin (died 477 BC)

== See also ==
- King Dao (disambiguation)
