= Wu Ji =

Wu Ji may refer to:

- Wu Ji (Fengshen Bang), a fictional character in the novel Fengshen Bang
- The Promise (2005 film), Chinese title Wu Ji, a 2005 film
- Wu Ji (space scientist) (born 1958), Chinese space scientist
- Wu Ji (athlete) (born 1978), Chinese triple jumper

== See also ==
- Wuji (disambiguation)
