= Marquis Mu =

Marquis Mu may refer to:

- Marquis Mu of Jin (died 785 BC)
- Marquis Mu of Cai (died 646 BC)

== See also ==
- Duke Mu (disambiguation)
