= Yang Sun =

Yang Sun may refer to:

- Sun Yang (sportsperson) (born 1991), a Chinese swimmer
- Bole (mythology), Chinese 6th century BCE horse-tamer and equine physiognomist, real name Yang Sun
