= Duke Mu =

Duke Mu may refer to these ancient Chinese rulers:

- Duke Mu of Cao (fl. 8th century BC)
- Duke Mu of Chen (672–632 BC)
- Duke Mu of Qin (died 621 BC)

== See also ==
- King Mu (disambiguation)
