= Wuji =

Wuji can refer to:

- Wuji (people) (勿吉人), pronounced in ancient times as Moji or Merjie, an ancient ethnic group in Manchuria
- Wuji (philosophy), concept in Chinese philosophy and Taoism, as contrasted with taiji
- The Promise (2005 film), directed by Chen Kaige with the native Chinese title 無極; Wújí
- Zhangsun Wuji, Tang Dynasty chancellor

== Locations in China ==
- Wuji County, Shijiazhuang, Hebei
- Wuji, Hengdong (吴集镇), a town of Hengdong County, Hunan.
- Wuji, Huai'an (吴集镇), town in Huaiyin District, Huai'an, Jiangsu
- Wuji, Shuyang County (吴集镇), town in Jiangsu
- Wuji, Rushan (午极镇), town in Shandong

== Locations in Singapore ==
- Bukit Batok, a planning area located at the West Region of Singapore (武吉巴督; Wǔjí Bādū)
- Bukit Panjang, a planning area located at the West Region of Singapore (武吉班让; Wǔjí Bānràng)
- Bukit Timah, a planning area located at the Central Region of Singapore (武吉知马; Wǔjí Zhīmǎ)
- Bukit Merah, a planning area located at the Central Region of Singapore (武吉美拉; Wǔjí Měilā) (currently not used, but the correct Chinese name was 红山; Hóngshān)

== See also ==
- Wu Ji (disambiguation)
