= Count You of Cao =

Count You of Cao (?–826 BCE) (Chinese: 曹幽伯; pinyin: Cáo Yōu Bó) was the seventh ruler of the vassal State of Cao during the Chinese Western Zhou dynasty (1046–770 BCE). Born Jī Jiāng (姬疆), he was the son of Count Xiao of Cao (曹孝伯) and the younger brother of Count Yi of Cao (曹夷伯).

Count You was killed by his younger brother Count Dai of Cao (曹戴伯) in 826 BCE after a nine-year reign.

Count You of Cao State of Cao
Regnal titles
| Preceded by Count Yi of Cao (曹夷伯) | Ruler of Cao; 835–826 BC | Succeeded by Count Dai of Cao (曹戴伯) |
