= Cao (state) =

Zhou Dynasty Chinese vassal state (1046–221 BC)

State of Cao 曹
- 11th century BC–487 BC
- Capital: Táoqiū (陶丘)
- Common languages: Old Chinese
- Government: Earldom
- History
  - Established: 11th century BC
  - Disestablished: 487 BC

Cao
- Chinese: 曹
Transcriptions
Standard Mandarin
- Hanyu Pinyin: Cáo
- Wade–Giles: Ts'ao^{2}
- IPA: [tsʰǎʊ]
Yue: Cantonese
- Yale Romanization: Chòuh
- Jyutping: Cou^{4}
Southern Min
- Hokkien POJ: Chô
- Tâi-lô: Tsô
Middle Chinese
- Middle Chinese: Dzaw
Old Chinese
- Baxter–Sagart (2014): *N-tsˤu

The State of Cao (simplified Chinese: 曹国; traditional Chinese: 曹國; pinyin: Cáoguó) was a vassal state in China during the Zhou dynasty (1046–221 BC). The state was founded sometime in the 11th century BC by Shu Zhenduo of Cao (d. 1053 BC), a son of King Wen of Zhou and younger brother of King Wu of Zhou. With its capital at Taoqiu (陶丘), the State of Cao covered roughly the area of modern-day Dingtao County, Shandong Province. It was located on the flat country of the North China Plain about 50 miles east of the point where the current course of the Yellow River changes from east to north-east. To the northwest was Wey, to the northeast Lu and to the southeast Song.

== History ==
As a result of the Cao's relative weakness, later generations wrote few records on events concerning the state's history. The only major event recorded in the Records of the Grand Historian during the Western Zhou dynasty (1046 – 770 BC) was in 826 BC when Count You of Cao was killed by his younger brother Count Dai of Cao.

At the beginning of the Eastern Zhou dynasty (770 BC), the State of Cao suffered internal upheaval. In 760 BC, Duke Mu of Cao killed his elder brother Count Fei of Cao and appointed himself the eleventh ruler. He was the first ruler of the State of Cao to receive the title of "Duke" (公).

During the Spring and Autumn period the State of Cao became caught up in the struggle for hegemony between the states of Jin and Chu. In 637 BC Chong'er, son of Duke Xian of Jin got into difficulties when passing through the State of Cáo and was treated rudely by Duke Gong of Cao.

About 630 it was a vassal or ally of Chu. When Chu attacked Song, Jin made a diversionary attack on Cao. After Jin defeated Chu at the Battle of Chengpu in 632 BC, Jin crushed the State of Cao, rescued the State of Song and took Duke Gong of Cao prisoner. After the defeat of the State of Chu, Cao followed the orders of its near neighbour the State of Jin.

Later on, the States of Cao and Song became hostile towards each other. Duke Jing of Song captured Duke Dao of Cao in 515 BC and held him prisoner until his death. Thereafter, disorder broke out in Cao and Duke Dao's successors Duke Sheng of Cao and Duke Yin of Cao were killed one after another. Duke Fei of Cao became ruler and betrayed the State of Jin by invading the State of Song. As a result, Duke Jing of Song attacked Cao. No troops from the State of Jin came to the rescue such that the State of Cao was exterminated in 487 BC after the capture of Duke Fei of Cao.

== Legacy ==
Descendants of the people of Cao adopted the name of their former state. This is one origin of the Chinese Surname Cao.

== Rulers of Cao ==
Rulers of the State of Cao
English name	Reign name	Personal name	Reign
Cao Shu Zhenduo	曹叔振鐸 (Cáo Shū Zhènduó)	振鐸/振铎 ( Zhènduó)	?–1053 BC
Count Tai of Cao	曹太伯 (Cáo Tài Bó)	脾 ( Pí)	1053–1002 BC
Lord Zhong of Cao	曹仲君 (Cáo Zhòng Jūn)	平 ( Píng)	1002–935 BC
Count Gong of Cao	曹宮伯 (Cáo Gōng Bó)	侯 ( Hóu)	935–895 BC
Count Xiao of Cao	曹孝伯 (Cáo Xiào Bó)	云 ( Yún)	895–865 BC
Count Yi of Cao	曹夷伯 (Cáo Yí Bó)	喜 ( Xǐ)	864–835 BC
Count You of Cao	曹幽伯 (Cáo Yōu Bó)	疆 (Jiāng)	835–826 BC
Count Dai of Cao	曹戴伯 (Cáo Dài Bó)	蘇/苏 ( Sū)	826–796 BC
Count Hui of Cao	曹惠伯 (Cáo Huì Bó)	兕 ( Sì)	794–760 BC
Count Fei of Cao	曹廢伯 (Cáo Fèi Bó)	石甫 ( Shífǔ)	760–760 BC
Duke Mu of Cao	曹穆公 (Cáo Mù Gōng)	武 ( Wǔ)	759– 757 BC
Duke Huan of Cao	曹桓公 (Cáo Huán Gōng)	終生/终生 ( Zhōng Shēng)	756–702 BC
Duke Zhuang of Cao	曹莊公/曹庄公 (Cáo Zhuāng Gōng)	射姑 ( Shègū)	701–671 BC
Duke Li of Cao	曹釐公/曹厘公 (Cáo Lǐ Gōng)	夷 ( Yí)	670–662 BC
Duke Zhao of Cao	曹昭公 (Cáo Zhāo Gōng)	班 ( Bān)	661–653 BC
Duke Gong of Cao	曹共公 (Cáo Gòng Gōng)	襄 ( Xiāng)	652–618 BC
Duke Wen of Cao	曹文公 (Cáo Wén Gōng)	壽/寿 ( Shòu)	617–595 BC
Duke Xuan of Cao	曹宣公 (Cáo Xuān Gōng)	彊 ( Qiáng)	594–578 BC
Duke Cheng of Cao	曹成公 (Cáo Chéng Gōng)	負芻/负刍( Fùchú)	577–555 BC
Duke Wu of Cao	曹武公 (Cáo Wǔ Gōng)	勝/胜 ( Shèng)	554–528 BC
Duke Ping of Cao	曹平公 (Cáo Píng Gōng)	須/须 ( Xū)	527–524 BC
Duke Dao of Cao	曹悼公 (Cáo Dào Gōng)	午( Wǔ)	523–515 BC
Duke Sheng of Cao	曹聲公/曹声公 (Cáo Shēng Gōng)	野 ( Yě)	514–510 BC
Duke Yin of Cao	曹隱公/曹隐公 (Cáo Yǐn Gōng)	通 (Tōng)	509–506 BC
Duke Jing of Cao	曹靖公 (Cáo Jìng Gōng)	露 ( Lù)	505–502 BC
Cao Bo yang	曹伯陽 (Cáo Bóyáng	伯陽/伯阳 ( Bóyáng)	501–487 BC

== Rulers family tree ==
Cao state

Cao Shu Zhenduo 曹叔振铎
Count Tai of Cao 曹太伯
Lord Zhong of Cao 曹仲君
Count Gong of Cao 曹宫伯
Count Xiao of Cao 曹孝伯
Count Yi of Cao 曹夷伯 ?-865-835BC	Count You of Cao 曹幽伯 ?-835-826BC	Count Dai of Cao 曹戴伯 ?-826-796BC
Count Hui of Cao 曹惠伯 ?-795-760BC
Count Fei of Cao 石甫 ?-760BC	Duke Mu of Cao 曹缪公 ?-760-757BC
Duke Huan of Cao 曹桓公 ?-757-702BC
Duke Zhuang of Cao 曹庄公 ?-702-671BC
曹羁	Duke Li of Cao 曹僖公 ?-671-662BC
Duke Zhao of Cao 曹昭公 ?-662-653BC
Duke Gong of Cao 曹共公 ?-653-618BC
Duke Wen of Cao 曹文公 ?-618-595BC
Duke Xuan of Cao 曹宣公 ?-595-578BC
太子	Duke Cheng of Cao 曹成公 ?-578-555BC	公子欣时
Duke Wu of Cao 曹武公 ?-555-528BC	公孙会
Duke Ping of Cao 曹平公 ?-528-524BC	Duke Yin of Cao 曹隐公 ?-510-506BC
Duke Dao of Cao 曹悼公 ?-524-515BC	Duke Sheng of Cao 曹声公 ?-515-510BC	Duke Jing of Cao 曹靖公 ?-506-502BC
Cao Bo yang 曹伯阳 ?-502-487BC

== See also ==
- Zou (state), founded by a Zhu lineage (later Zhulou and Zou) of the Cao clan, unrelated to the Cao lineage of Zhou Ji clan.
