= King Dao =

King Dao may refer to these monarchs of ancient China:

- King Dao of Zhou (died 520 BC)
- King Dao of Chu (died 381 BC)

== See also ==
- Duke Dao (disambiguation)
