= Duke Gong of Cao =

Ruler of Chinese state of Cao from 652 to 618 BCE

Duke Gong of Cao 曹共公

Ruler of Cao
- Reign: 652-618 BCE
- Predecessor: Duke Zhao of Cao
- Successor: Duke Wen of Cao
- Died: 618 BCE
Names
- Ancestral name: Ji (姬); Given name: Xiang (襄)
- House: House of Ji
- Father: Duke Zhao of Cao

Duke Gong of Cao (? – 618 BCE) (Chinese: 曹共公; pinyin: Cáo Gòng Gōng) was the seventeenth ruler of the vassal State of Cao during the Chinese Spring and Autumn period (770 – 475 BCE). Born Ji Xiang (姬襄), he was the son of Duke Zhao of Cao.

== History ==
In 637 BCE, during the exile of Chong’er, son of Duke Xian of Jin, Duke Gong heard that Chong’er suffered from fused ribs in a parallel way that makes it look like one rib bone(which was considered as the sign of saints in ancient times) and wanted to see for himself. Chong’er caught Duke Gong spying on him whilst he bathed and described the Duke as a man of “unbelievable rudeness”.

After Chong’er became Duke Wen of Jin and one of the Five Hegemons, in 632 BCE, he used Duke Gòng's previous rudeness as an excuse to overthrow the State of Cao. Duke Gòng was captured by the State of Jin but later released.

After Duke Gong of Cao died in 618 BCE, his son Duke Wen of Cao became ruler.

Duke Gong of Cao State of Cao
Regnal titles
Preceded by Duke Zhao of Cao	Ruler of Cao; 652 BC – 618 BC	Succeeded by Duke Wen of Cao
