= Duke Ping of Cao =

Chinese ruler of Cáo from 527 to 524 BC

Duke Ping of Cáo (Chinese: 曹平公; pinyin: Cáo Píng Gōng) was a nobleman in ancient China, who lived during the Zhou dynasty.

He was ruler of the State of Cao from 527 BC to 524 BC, successor and son of Duke Wu of Cao.

His personal name was 須/须 (Xū).

Pingʻs son Jī Wŭ later became Duke Dao of Cao after Ping died in 524 BC.

Duke Ping of Cao State of Cáo
Regnal titles
Preceded by Duke Wu of Cao	Ruler of Cáo; 527 BC – 524 BC	Succeeded by Duke Dao of Cao
