= Zaofu =

Zaofu (Chinese: 造父; pinyin: Zàofǔ), formerly romanized Tsao Fu, was a Western Zhou dynasty exceptionally-skilled charioteer who is said to have lived around 950 BC.

Zaofu was the direct male great-grandson of Ji Sheng (季勝), the younger brother of Elai.

He was counted as a member of the House of Ying, the founder of Zhao and the 3rd cousin twice removed of Feizi, the founder of Qin, but his exploits made him a figure of Chinese mythology.

The Chinese tell the story of King Mu of Zhou, who was determined to visit paradise. He wanted to taste the peaches of immortality there. He found a very brave charioteer named Zaofu, who drove eight amazing horses with great skill. Zaofu was afraid of nothing—he carried the emperor across the Earth and into the heavens. The emperor finally reached Mount Kunlun and tasted the peaches of immortality. His brave charioteer Zaofu was carried up to the stars, where both he and his eight horses can be seen among the stars of the constellation Cepheus. The Chinese constellation Zaofu is formed by the stars Delta, Epsilon, Zeta, Mu, and Nu Cephei. A famous presentation of the story is available in the Tale of King Mu, Son of Heaven.

Another story explained Zaofu as a horseman who brought King Mu to see the Goddess of the West. After arriving, they learnt of an invasion of China and immediately left to defend the country. Following the victory, for Zaofu's services, the king Mu granted him a city for his descendants called Zhao (趙). Zaofu and his descendants adopted Zhao as their surname, Zhao Cui was a descendant of Zaofu, Zhao Cui's descendants subsequently led the State of Zhao, so that Zaofu is counted as the ancestor of the people of the surname Zhao, despite many of them simply descending from residents of the state.

== See also ==
- House of Ying
