= Wu Ji (space scientist) =

Chinese physicist

Ji Wu from the National Space Science Center, Beijing, China was named Fellow of the Institute of Electrical and Electronics Engineers (IEEE) in 2015 for leadership in microwave remote sensing and its application to satellite programs.
