= Duke Dao of Cao =

Ruler of Chinese State of Cao from 523 to 515 BCE

Duke Dao of Cao (6th century BCE) (Chinese: 曹悼公; pinyin: Cáo Dào Gōng) was the twenty-second ruler of the vassal State of Cao during the Chinese Spring and Autumn period (770 – 475 BCE).

Born as Jī Wŭ (姬午), he was the son of Duke Ping of Cao from whom he inherited the throne from 523 BCE.

Duke Jing of Song captured Duke Dào in 515 BCE and held him prisoner until his death.

Thereafter, disorder broke out in the State of Cáo as Dào’s successors, Duke Sheng of Cao and Duke Yin of Cao, were killed one after the other.

Duke Dao of Cao State of Cao
Regnal titles
Preceded by Duke Ping of Cao	Ruler of Cao; 523 BCE – 515 BCE	Succeeded by Duke Sheng of Cao
