= Duke Mu of Cao =

8th Century BCE ruler of the Chinese vassal State of Cao

Duke Mu of Cao (8th Century BCE) (Chinese: 曹穆公; pinyin: Cáo Mù Gōng) was the eleventh ruler of the vassal State of Cao during the Chinese Eastern Zhou dynasty (770 – 256 BCE) and Spring and Autumn period. Born Jī Wǔ (姬武), he was the son of Cáo Huìbó (曹惠伯). In 760 BCE, Duke Mu of Cao killed his elder brother Cáo Fèibó (曹廢伯/曹废伯) and appointed himself ruler of the State of Cao. He was the first ruler of the State of Cao to receive the posthumous title of "Duke" (公).

Duke Mu of Cao State of Cao
Regnal titles
Preceded by Feibo of Cao (曹廢伯/曹废伯)	Ruler of Cao; 759–757 BC	Succeeded by Duke Huan of Cao (曹桓公)

== Historical record ==
Duke Mu of Cao is only breifly mentioned in the Records of the Grand Historian. In its entirety:

三十六，惠伯卒，子石甫立，其弟武殺之代立，是為繆公 繆公三年卒，子桓公終生 立。

In the thirty-sixth year [of Huibo's reign], Huibo died and his son Shipu was instated. His younger brother Wu killed him and was instated instead, becoming known as Duke Mu. In the third year of Duke Mu, he died, and his son Duke Huang Zhongsheng was installed.

— Sima Qian, Records of the Grand Historian
