= Tale of King Mu, Son of Heaven =

Literary work of ancient China

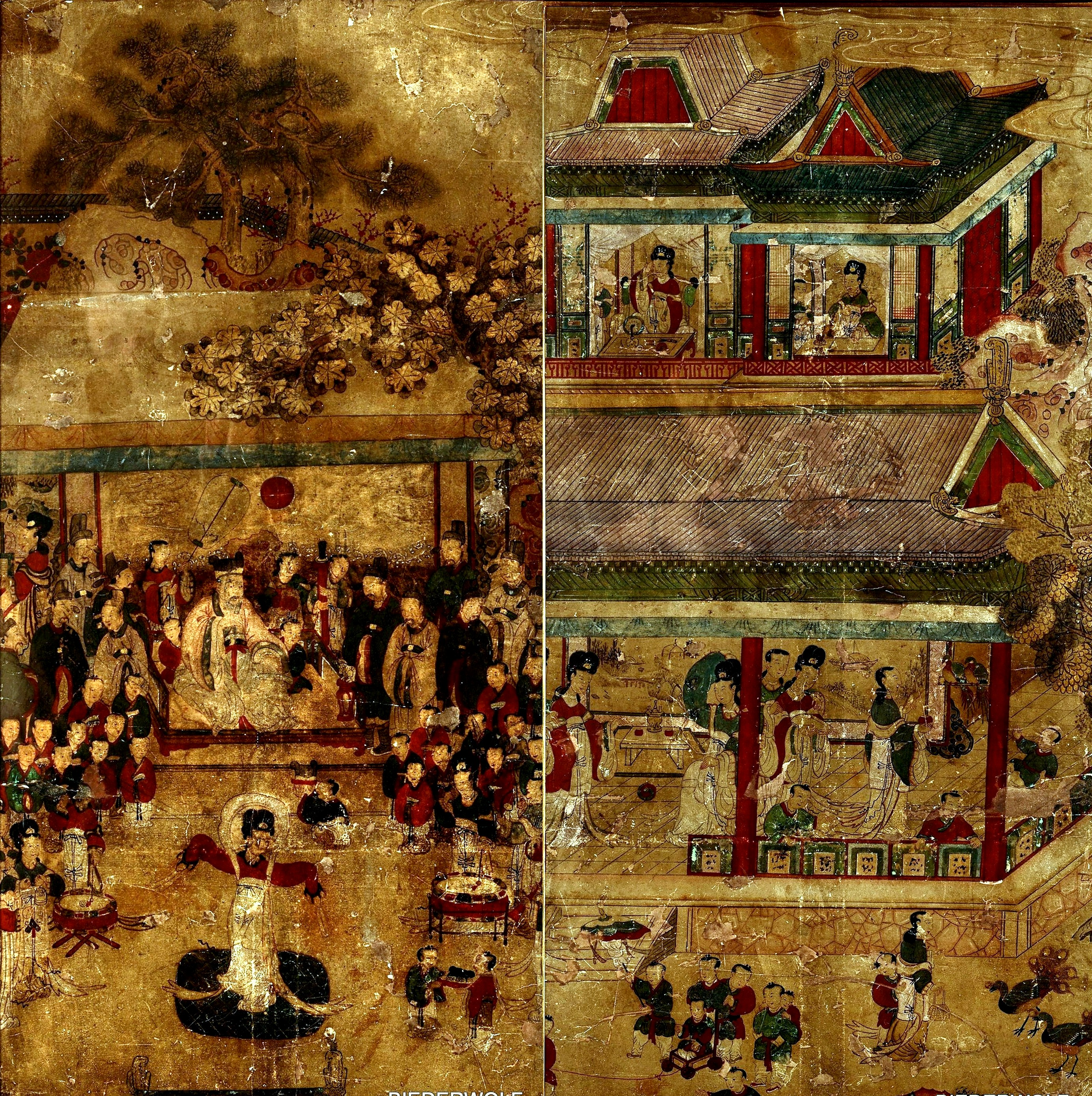
King Mu and the Queen Mother of the West, an illustration from Joseon Korea

Pages from a printed edition of a commentary version of the Tale of King Mu, Son of Heaven, edited by Guo Pu

A page from a printed edition of the Tale of King Mu, Son of Heaven, with additional editing, redaction and commentary done by the Ming dynasty scholar Fan Qin

Pages from a printed edition of the text, located in the Shanghai Library

The Tale of King Mu, Son of Heaven (traditional Chinese: 穆天子傳; simplified Chinese: 穆天子传; pinyin: Mù Tiānzǐ Zhuàn) (Note: Literally "Mu(,) Heaven('s) Son('s) Tale". "Son of Heaven" is a designation for a sovereign of China, and the word used for tale is often a biography or history.) is an ancient Chinese text that dates from the Warring States period (475–221 BC). It is a fantasy narrative version of the travels of King Mu of Zhou, historical fifth sovereign of the Zhou dynasty of China, r. 976–922 BCE or 956–918 BCE.

The written originals of the fantasy biography of King Mu and a biography of his mother were found along with the Bamboo Annals in the tomb of Wei Xiang-zi (d. 296 BCE), king of Wei, rediscovered in 281 CE during the Jin dynasty (266–420), after which they were merged into a single tale during transmission.

Transmitted are four textual lineages which became independent from the original. Later versions were sometimes called Zhou Wang Youxing, literally "(The) Zhou King('s) Travels" or "Travels of the Zhou King".

The Ming dynasty (1368-1644) scholar Hu Yinglin regard the Tale of King Mu, Son of Heaven to be a pioneering work of Chinese fiction.

== Contents ==
King Mu dreamed of being an immortal. He determined to visit the Western heavenly paradise of the Queen Mother of the West on Mount Kunlun and taste her Peaches of Immortality. A brave charioteer named Zao Fu carried the king and seven worthy companions by chariot to the Queen Mother, whom he feasts at blue gem pool in chapter 3 with a banquet, wine, gifts, and decorous exchange of poems with some sense of his being subsequently rejuvenated or at least blessed with posterity. The implications of the poems seem to cast the Queen Mother of the West as a vassal whom King Mu confirms in ruling her own land.

Chapter 6 mainly recounts the death of King Mu's favorite consort, Cheng Ji, with details of her funeral with a huge entourage which takes eight days to arrive at her burial site. Heartbroken, King Mu tarries there, fishing, hunting, until a soldier chides and admonishes him into returning his attention to government and slowly traveling back to his capital.

The Tale of King Mu, Son of Heaven is an early textually extant narrative case of Chinese literature stressing a particular heroic human, though the biography, apparently fantastic or considered credible, is a chief format of Chinese literature from its outset with focus on sovereigns and their exploits, particularly with governmental preoccupation with geography through the peripheries of the emergent Chinese state.

== Commentaries ==
The earliest commentary to the text was written by the scholar Guo Pu (276–324) during the Eastern Jin.

During the Qing dynasty (1644-1912), the text was revisited by Tan Cui (檀萃), Hong Yixuan (洪頤煊) and Zhai Yunsheng (翟雲升).

== Modern scholarship ==
- Porter, Deborah Lynn. From Deluge to Discourse: Myth, History, and the Generation of Chinese Fiction. State University of New York, 1996.
