= King Mu of Zhou =

Fifth king of the Zhou dynasty

King Mu of Zhou 周穆王
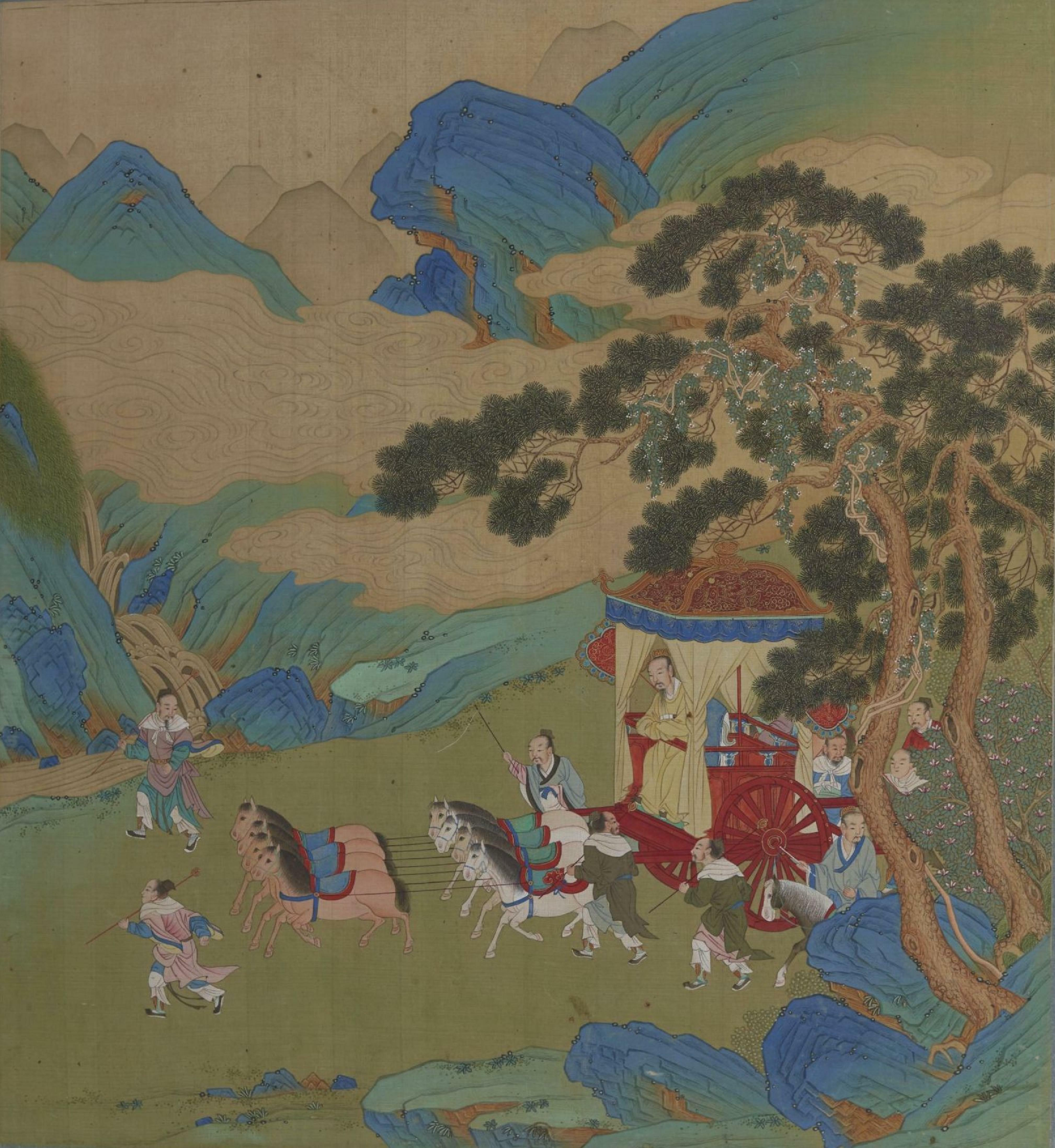
- 18th Century depiction of King Mu with his eight stallions.

King of the Zhou dynasty
- Reign: 976 BC–922 BC
- Predecessor: King Zhao of Zhou
- Successor: King Gong of Zhou
- Born: Ji Man (姬滿); 992 BC
- Died: 922 BC
- Spouse: Wang Zu Jiang; Sheng Ji
- Issue: Ji Yihu, King Gong of Zhou; Ji Bifang, King Xiao of Zhou; Baozong, Viscount of Xu; Shuqie
Names
- Ancestral name: Jī (姬); Given name: Mǎn (滿)
Posthumous name
- King Mu (穆王) or King Miu (繆王)
- House: Ji
- Dynasty: Zhou (Western Zhou)
- Father: King Zhao of Zhou
- Mother: Queen Fang

King Mu of Zhou

Posthumous name
- Chinese: 周穆王
- Literal meaning: The Solemn King of Zhou
Transcriptions
Standard Mandarin
- Hanyu Pinyin: Zhōu Mù Wáng
- Wade–Giles: Chou Mu-wang; King Mu of Chou

King Mu of Zhou (Chinese: 周穆王; pinyin: Zhōu Mù Wáng), personal name Ji Man, was the fifth king of the Zhou dynasty of China. The dates of his reign are 976–922 BC or 956–918 BC.

== Life ==
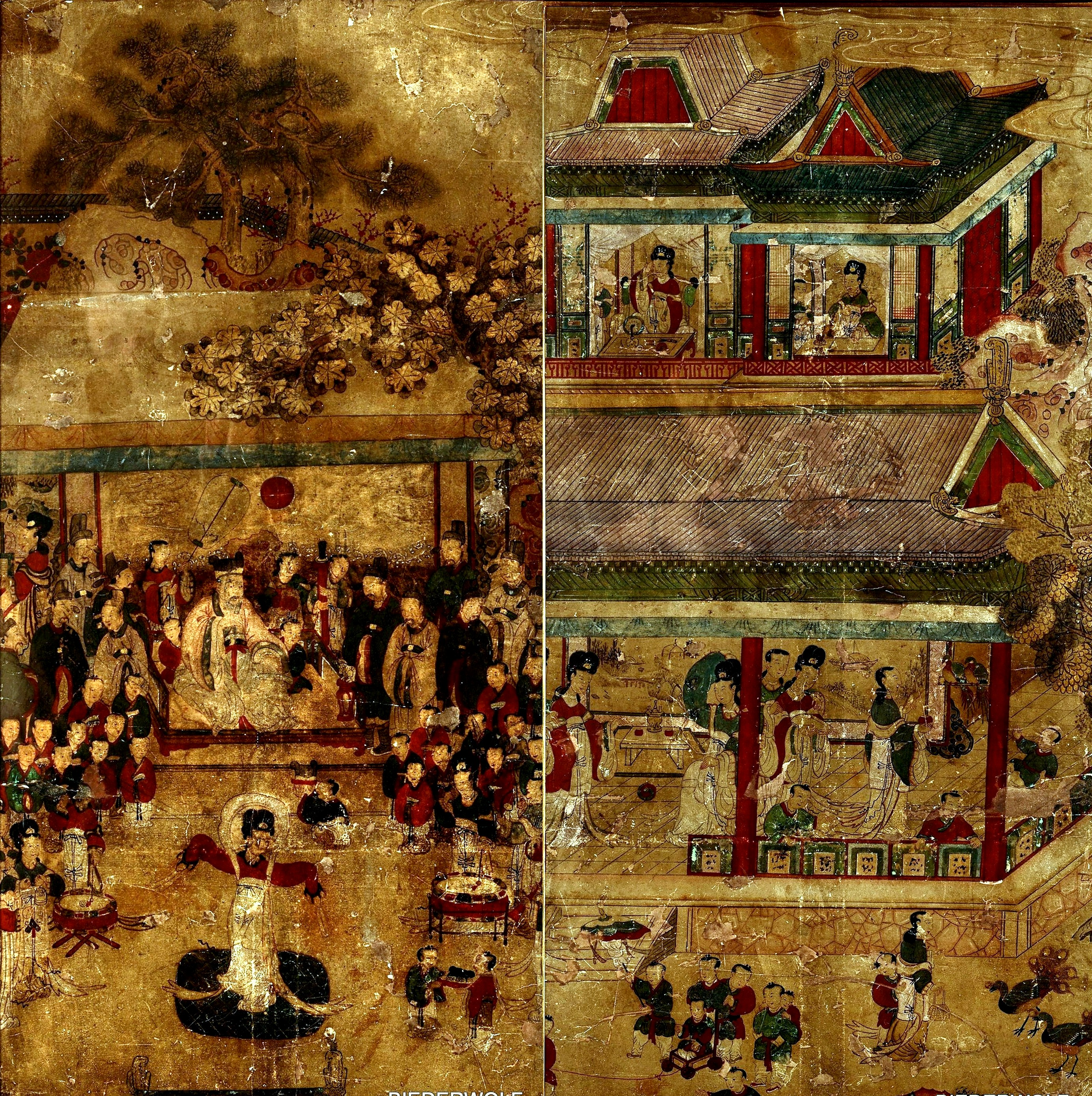
Joseon painting Yoji yeondo (요지연도) depicting King Mu visiting the goddess Queen Mother of the West at Yaochi in the mythical mountain Kunlun.

King Mu came to the throne after his father King Zhao’s death during the Zhou-Chu war. King Mu was perhaps the most pivotal king of the Zhou dynasty, reigning nearly 55 years, from ca. 976 BC to ca. 922 BC. Mu was more ambitious than wise, yet he was able to introduce reforms that changed the nature of the Zhou government, transforming it from a hereditary system to one that was based on merit and knowledge of administrative skills.

Mu tried to stamp out invaders in the western part of China and ultimately expand Zhou’s influence to the east. In the height of his passion for conquests, he led an immense army against the Quanrong, who inhabited the western part of China. His travels allowed him to contact many tribes and swayed them to either join under the Zhou banner or be conquered in war with his army. This expedition may have been more of a failure than a success, judging by the fact that he brought back only four white wolves and four white deer. Unintentionally and inadvertently, he thus sowed the seeds of hatred which culminated in an invasion of China by the same tribes in 771 BC. In his thirteenth year the Xu Rong, probably the state of Xu in the southeast, raided near the eastern capital of Chengzhou. The war seems to have ended in a truce in which the state of Xu gained land and power in return for nominal submission.

However, despite his success, traditional historiography viewed him with controversy. While some praise his victories against the Quanrong, others criticized him for from his time, the fourth border state no longer entered into a relationship with the Zhou dynasty. Even still, the Shang Shu credited him with establishing the first systematic legal code in China.

Mu was reputed in narratives to have lived until the age of 105 and to have traveled to the mythical mountain known as Kunlun - a popular later work is the Tale of King Mu, Son of Heaven.

His successor was his son King Gong of Zhou.

== In mythology ==
One Chinese myth tells a story about Mu, who dreamed of becoming an immortal. He was determined to visit the divine paradise of Kunlun and taste the Peaches of Immortality. A brave charioteer named Zaofu used his chariot to carry the king to his destination. The Tale of King Mu, Son of Heaven, a fourth-century BC romance, describes Mu’s visit to the Queen Mother of the West. Late Tang dynasty poet Li Shangyin retold the story in a poem of four lines.

In fiction, King Mu is frequently said to have eight horses, paired as "King Mu's Eight Stallions" (穆王八駿). Some names come from real sources, such as Xunzi and Liezi, but most are made-up.

Tale of King Mu, Son of Heaven
Name (Chinese & Pinyin)	Translation
赤驥; Chì Jì	Crimson Thoroughbred
盜驪; Dào Lí	Thief in Black
白義; Bái Yì	Pure Justice
踰輪; Yú Lún	Outrunning the Wheel
山子; Shān Zǐ	Mountain Prince
渠黃; Qú Huáng	Yellow Canal
華騮; Huá Liú	Splendid Chestnut
綠耳; Lǜ'ěr	Green Ears

Shi Yi Ji (拾遺記)
Name (Chinese & Pinyin)	Translation
絕地; Jué Dì	Earth Splitter
翻羽; Fān Yǔ	Flapping Feathers
奔霄; Bēn Xiāo	Dashing Clouds
越影; Yuè Yǐng	Leaping over Shadows
踰輝; Yú Huī	Surpassing Glory
超光; Chāo Guāng	Outrunning the Light
騰霧; Téng Wù	Rising Fog
挾翼; Xié Yì	Wing-Clasping

== Automaton ==
In the 3rd century BC text of the Liezi, there is a curious account on automata involving a much earlier encounter between Mu of Zhou and a mechanical engineer known as Yan Shi, an 'artificer'. The latter proudly presented the king with a life-size, human-shaped figure of his mechanical 'handiwork':

The king stared at the figure in astonishment. It walked with rapid strides, moving its head up and down, so that anyone would have taken it for a live human being. The artificer touched its chin, and it began singing, perfectly in tune. He touched its hand, and it began posturing, keeping perfect time... As the performance was drawing to an end, the robot winked its eye and made advances to the ladies in attendance, whereupon the king became incensed and would have had Yen Shih (Yan Shi) executed on the spot had not the latter, in mortal fear, instantly taken the robot to pieces to let him see what it really was. And, indeed, it turned out to be only a construction of leather, wood, adhesive and lacquer, variously coloured white, black, red and blue. Examining it closely, the king found all the internal organs complete—liver, gall, heart, lungs, spleen, kidneys, stomach and intestines; and over these again, muscles, bones and limbs with their joints, skin, teeth and hair, all of them artificial... The king tried the effect of taking away the heart, and found that the mouth could no longer speak; he took away the liver and the eyes could no longer see; he took away the kidneys and the legs lost their power of locomotion. The king was delighted.

== Family ==
Queens:

- Wang Zu Jiang, of the Jiang clan (王俎姜 姜姓)

Concubines:

- Sheng Ji, of the Ji clan of Cheng (盛姬 姬姓), a royal of Cheng by birth; buried with queenly honours

Sons:

- Crown Prince Yihu (太子繄扈; d. 900 BC), ruled as King Gong of Zhou from 921–900 BC
- Prince Bifang (王子闢方; d. 886 BC), ruled as King Xiao of Zhou from 891–886 BC
- Prince Baozong (王子寶宗), ruled as the Viscount of Xu

Daughters:

- A daughter whose personal name was Shuqie (叔㛗)

== See also ==
- Family tree of Chinese monarchs (ancient)

== Notes ==
King Mu of Zhou Zhou dynasty Died: 922 BC
Regnal titles
Preceded by King Zhao of Zhou	King of China; 977–922 BC	Succeeded by King Gong of Zhou
