= Chinese sculpture =

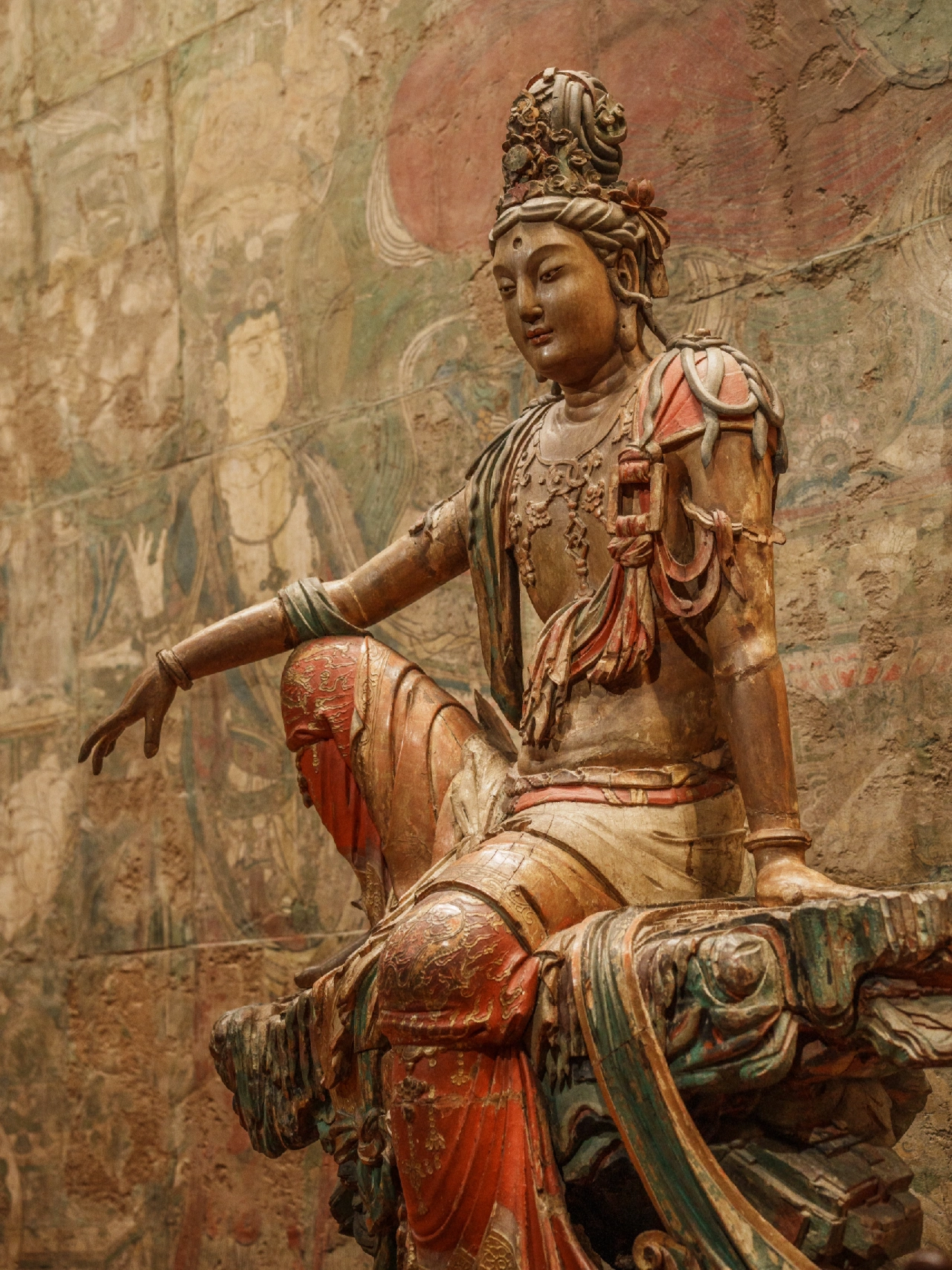
Water-Moon Guanyin (11th–12th century). Wood with polychrome and gold. Nelson-Atkins Museum of Art

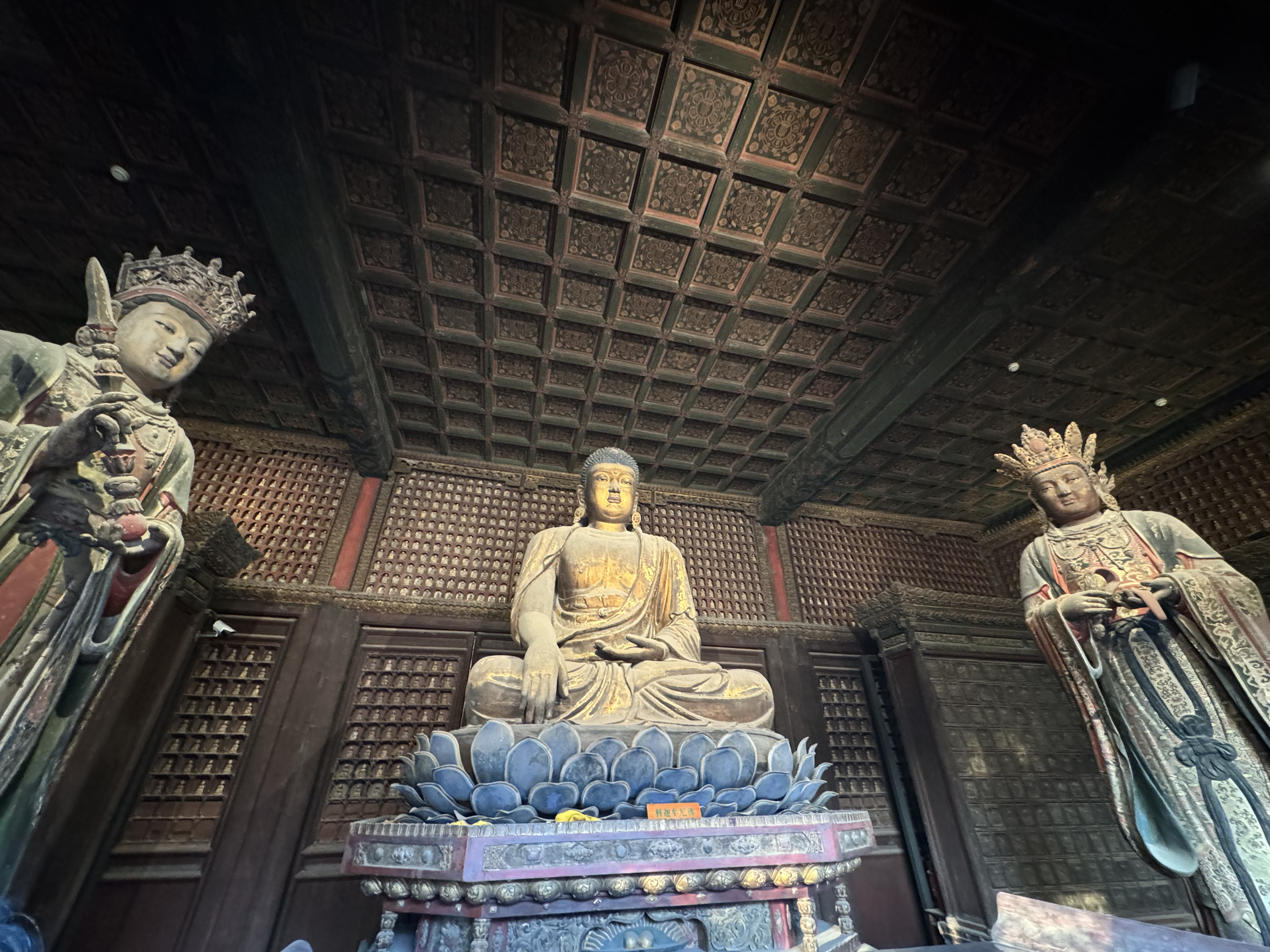
Buddhist statues from the Zhihua Temple near Beijing, Ming dynasty

Chinese sculpture originated from the Shang dynasty and has a history of more than 3,000 years. Chinese sculpture eventually influenced the sculpture of other nations such as Japan and Korea.

== Overview ==
Chinese ritual bronzes from the Shang and Western Zhou dynasties date from a period of over a thousand years beginning c. 1500 BC and have exerted a continuing influence over Chinese art. They are cast with complex patterned and zoomorphic decoration, but avoid the human figure, unlike the huge figures recently discovered at Sanxingdui.

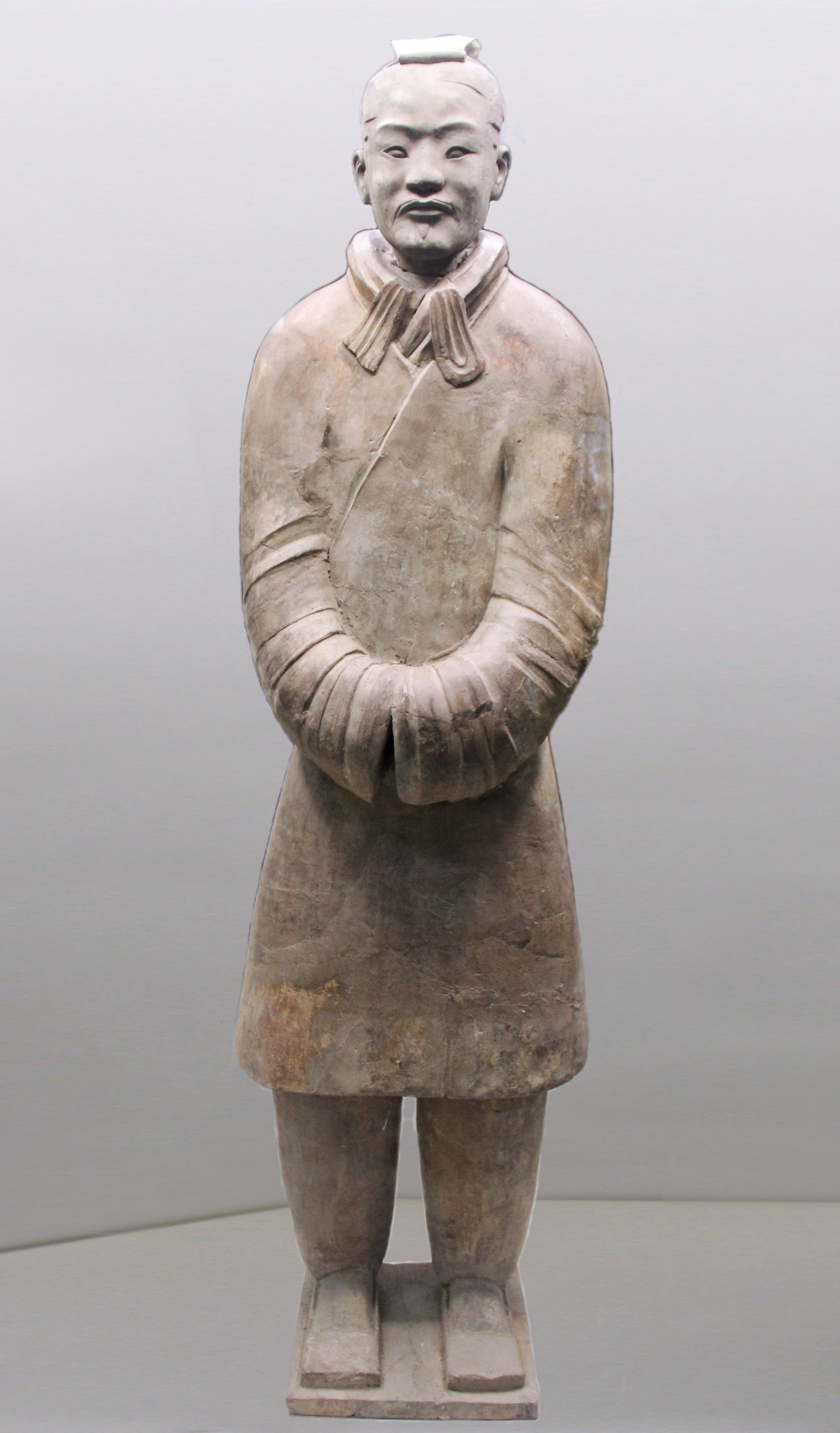
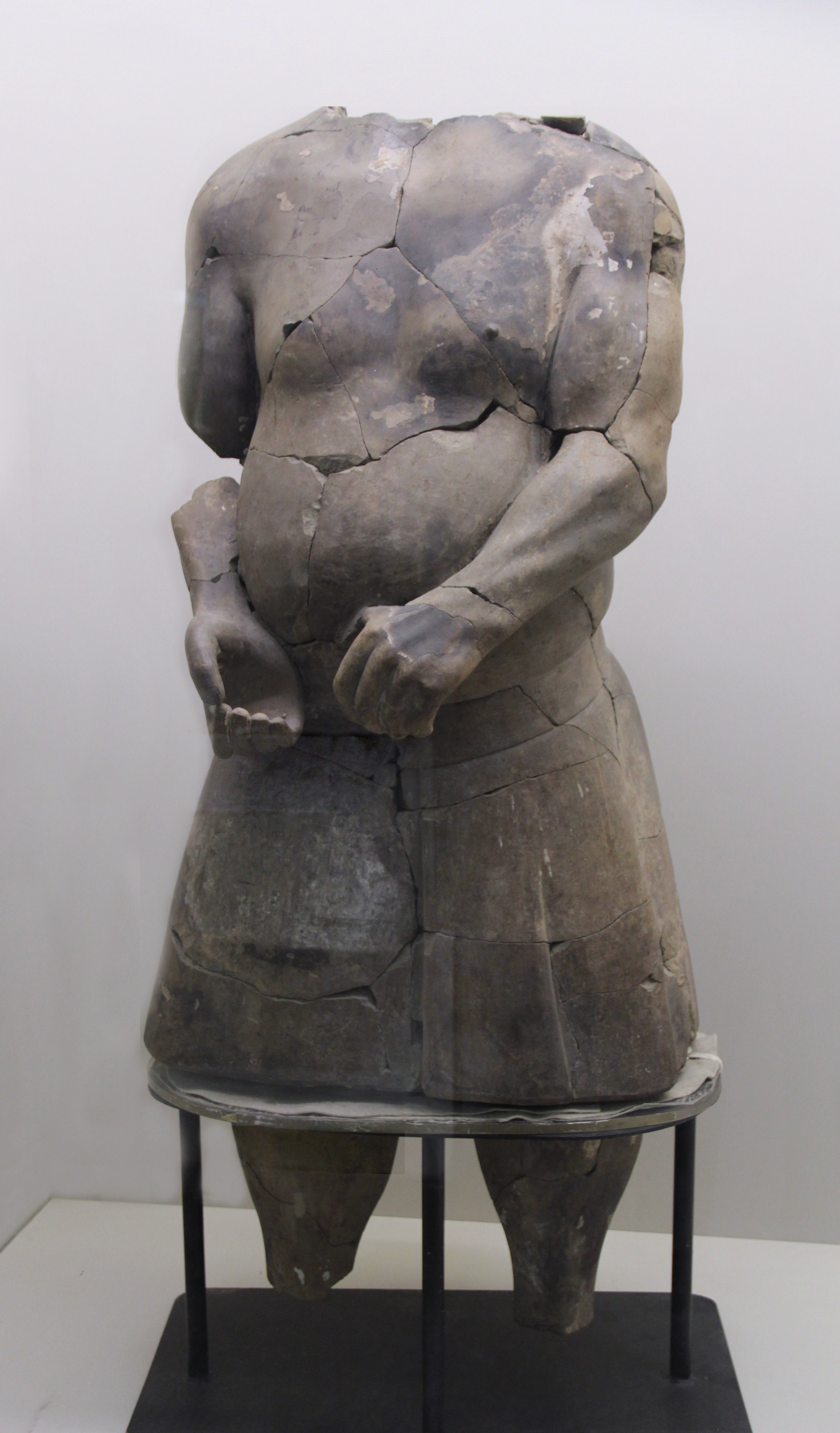
A Terracotta Army attendant, and one of the Acrobats. These were meant to guard the Mausoleum of the First Qin Emperor, 210 BCE

The spectacular Terracotta Army was assembled for the tomb of Qin Shi Huang, the first emperor of a unified China from 221 to 210 BC, as a grand imperial version of the figures long placed in tombs to enable the deceased to enjoy the same lifestyle in the afterlife as when alive, replacing the actual sacrifices of very early periods. Smaller figures in ceramic or wood were placed in tombs for many centuries afterwards, reaching a peak of quality in the Tang dynasty.

The earliest Chinese ritual treatises do not mention the use of images in worship, and it was not a part of the Confucian classics or mainstream early Daoism. Although there are mentions of venerated images of dead worthies and images of deities between the 1st and 5th centuries, elite opinion of the time tended to denigrate deity images as a vulgar (俗) religious practice. In the 5th century, the use of images in worship also became attacked as a specifically Buddhist practice.

Native Chinese religions do not usually use cult images of deities, or even represent them, and large religious sculpture is nearly all Buddhist, dating mostly from the 4th to the 14th century. One of the earliest Buddhist sculptures in China is a gilt-bronze seated Buddha with flame shoulders from the 3rd century, which displays influence from 2nd-century Chinese tomb art and Khalchayan sculpture. Chinese Buddhism is also the context of all known large portrait sculpture; in contrast to some areas in medieval China, even painted images of the emperor were regarded as private. Imperial tombs have spectacular avenues of approach lined with real and mythological animals on a scale matching Egypt, and smaller versions decorate temples and palaces. Small Buddhist figures and groups were produced to a very high standard in a range of media, as was relief decoration of all sorts of objects, especially in metalwork and jade. However, sculptors of all sorts were regarded as artisans, and very few names are recorded.

The Terracotta Army, inside the Mausoleum of the First Qin Emperor, consists of more than 7,000 life-size terra-cotta tomb figures of warriors and horses buried with the self-proclaimed first Emperor of Qin (Qin Shi Huang) in 210–209 BC. The figures were painted before being placed into the vault. The original colors were visible when the pieces were first unearthed. However, exposure to air caused the pigments to fade, so today the unearthed figures appear terracotta in color. The figures are in several poses, including standing infantry, kneeling archers, and charioteers with horses. Each figure's head appears to be unique, showing a variety of facial features, expressions, and hair styles.

== First monumental stone sculptures (117 BCE) ==
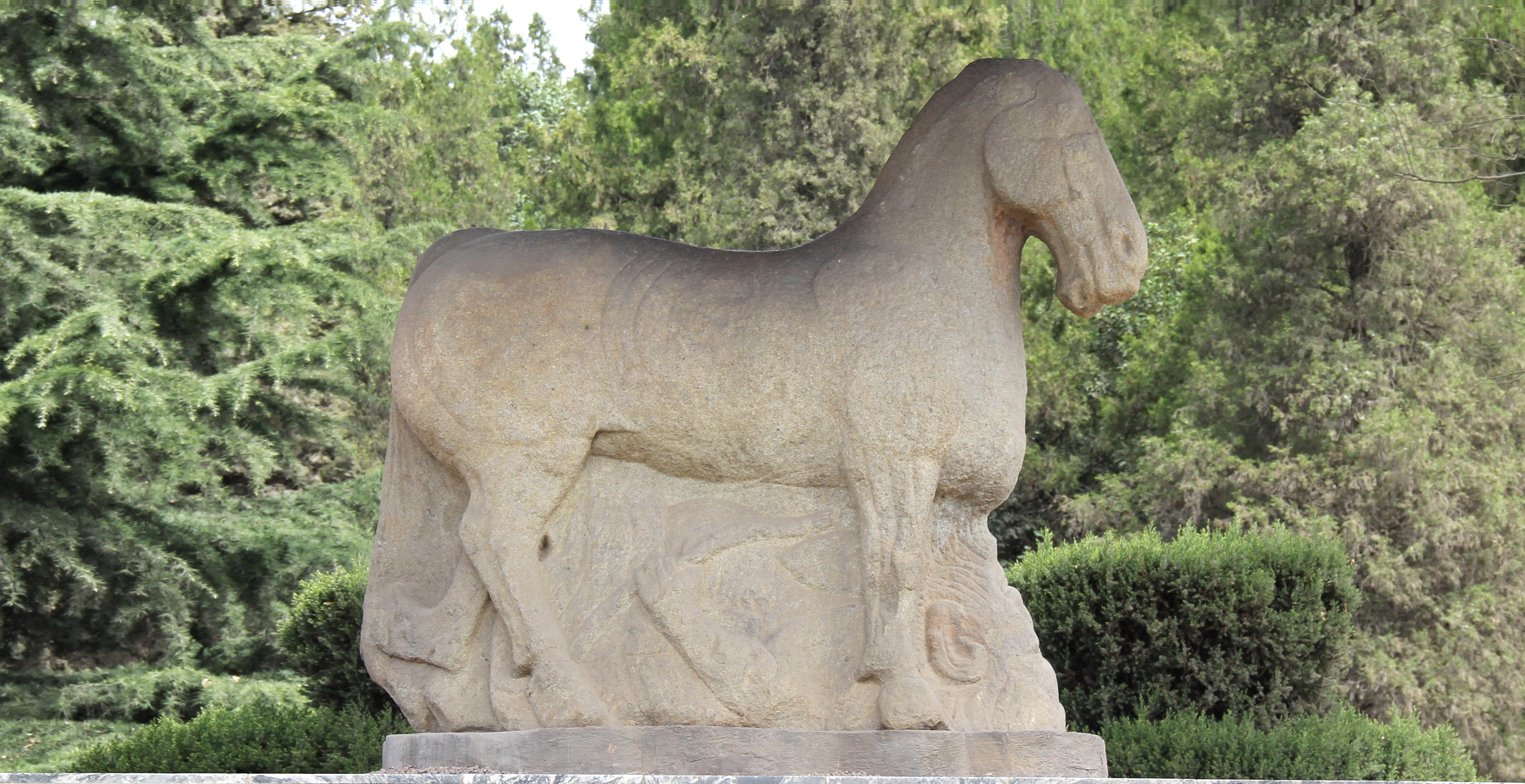
The horse statue at Huo Qubing's Mausoleum

Terracotta (baked clay) statuettes were known for a long time in China, but there are no known examples of monumental stone statuary before the stone sculptures at the Mausoleum of Huo Qubing, a general of Emperor Han Wudi who went to the western regions to fight the Xiongnu. In literary sources, there is only a single record of a possible earlier example: two alleged monumental statues of qilin (Chinese unicorns) that were set up on top of the tomb of the First Emperor Qin Shihuang. The most famous of Huo Qubing's statues is that of a horse trampling a Xiongnu warrior. The Mausoleum of Huo Qubing (located in Maoling, the Mausoleum of Han Wudi) has 15 more stone sculptures. These are less naturalistic than the "Horse trampling a Xiongnu", and tend to follow the natural shape of the stone, with details of the figures only emerging in high relief. Zhang Qian (−114 BCE), the famous traveler to the western regions, also had rudimentary stone statues of lions placed at his mausoleum.

These precursors of Chinese monumental stone sculpture were probably influenced by forays deep into Central Asia, where travellers would encounter cultures using stone statues. Recently, stone statues were discovered at the front of ancient tombs in the Altay and northern Xinjiang, which were probably influential. The complex technology of stone sculpture seems to have followed a process of West-East diffusion, starting from Egypt and Babylonia, reaching Greece, and finally reaching India with the Pillars of Ashoka (268–232 BCE) and China around the 2nd century BCE.

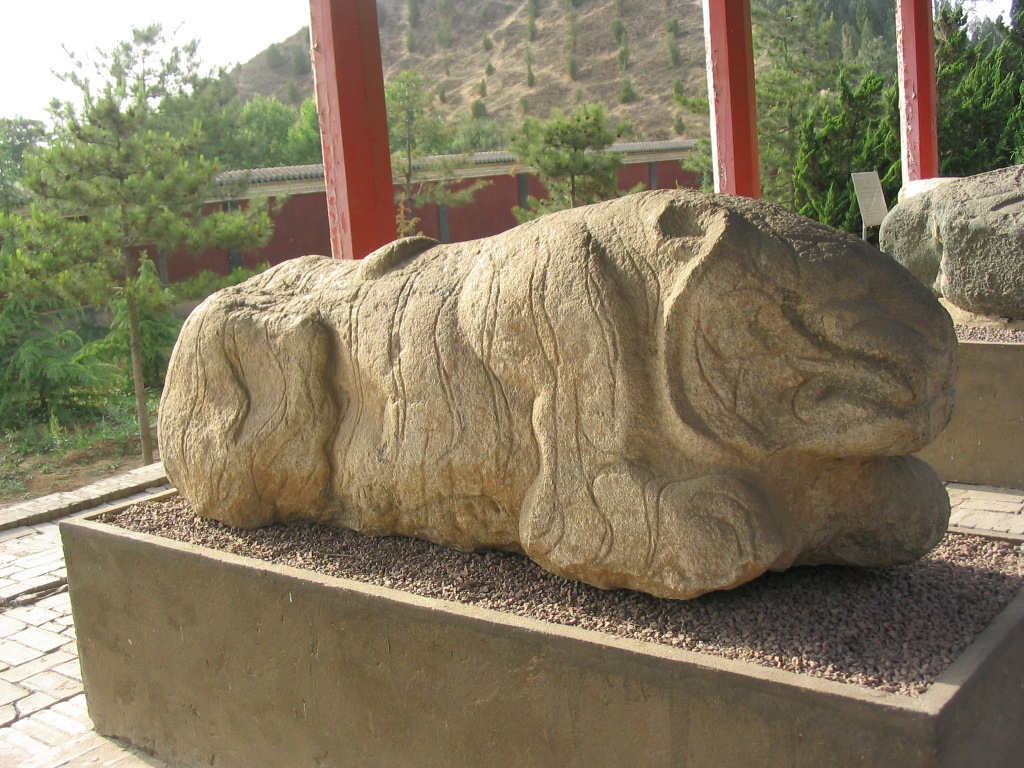
Crouching tiger, Huo Qubing Mausoleum

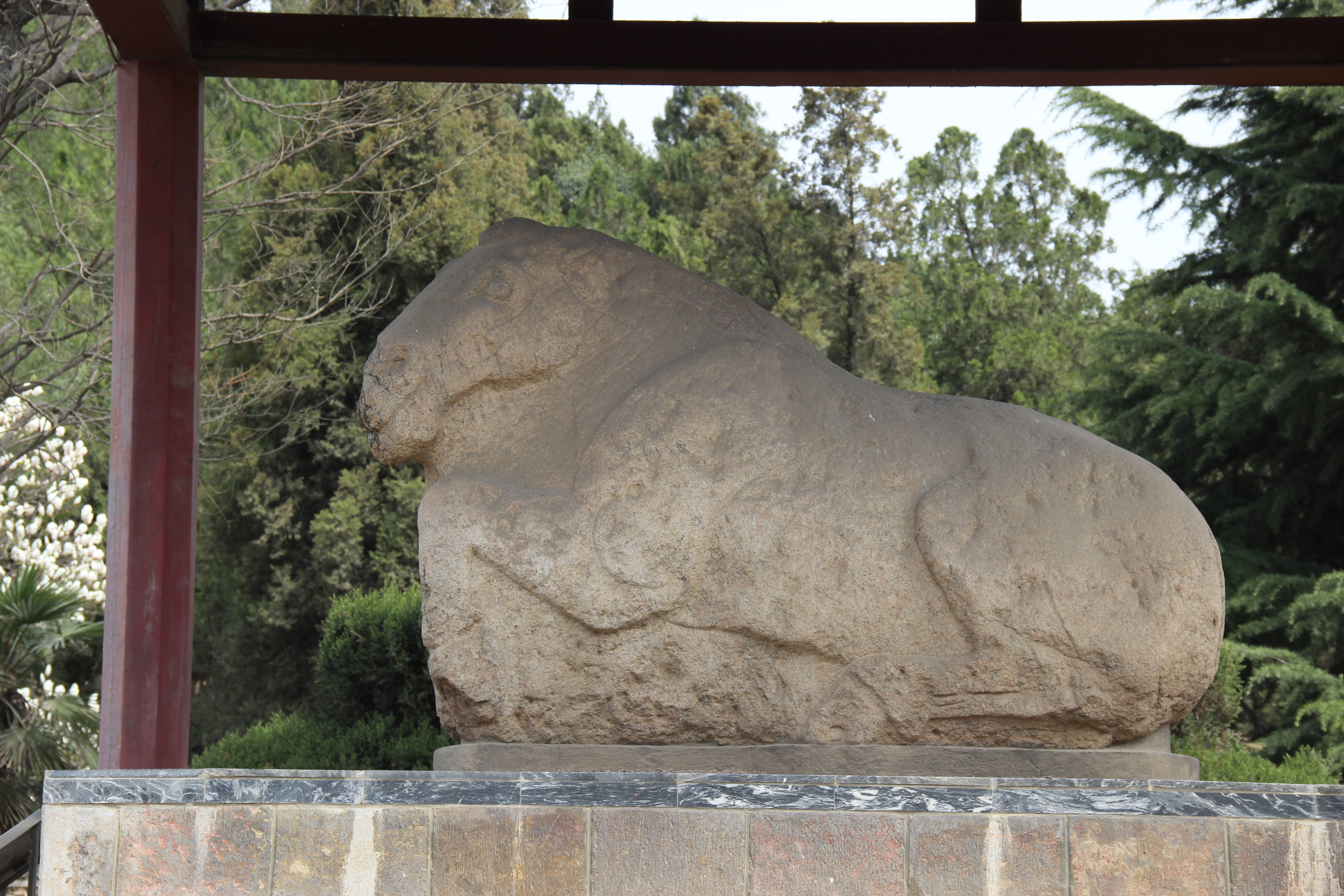
Horse Ready to Leap, Huo Qubing Mausoleum

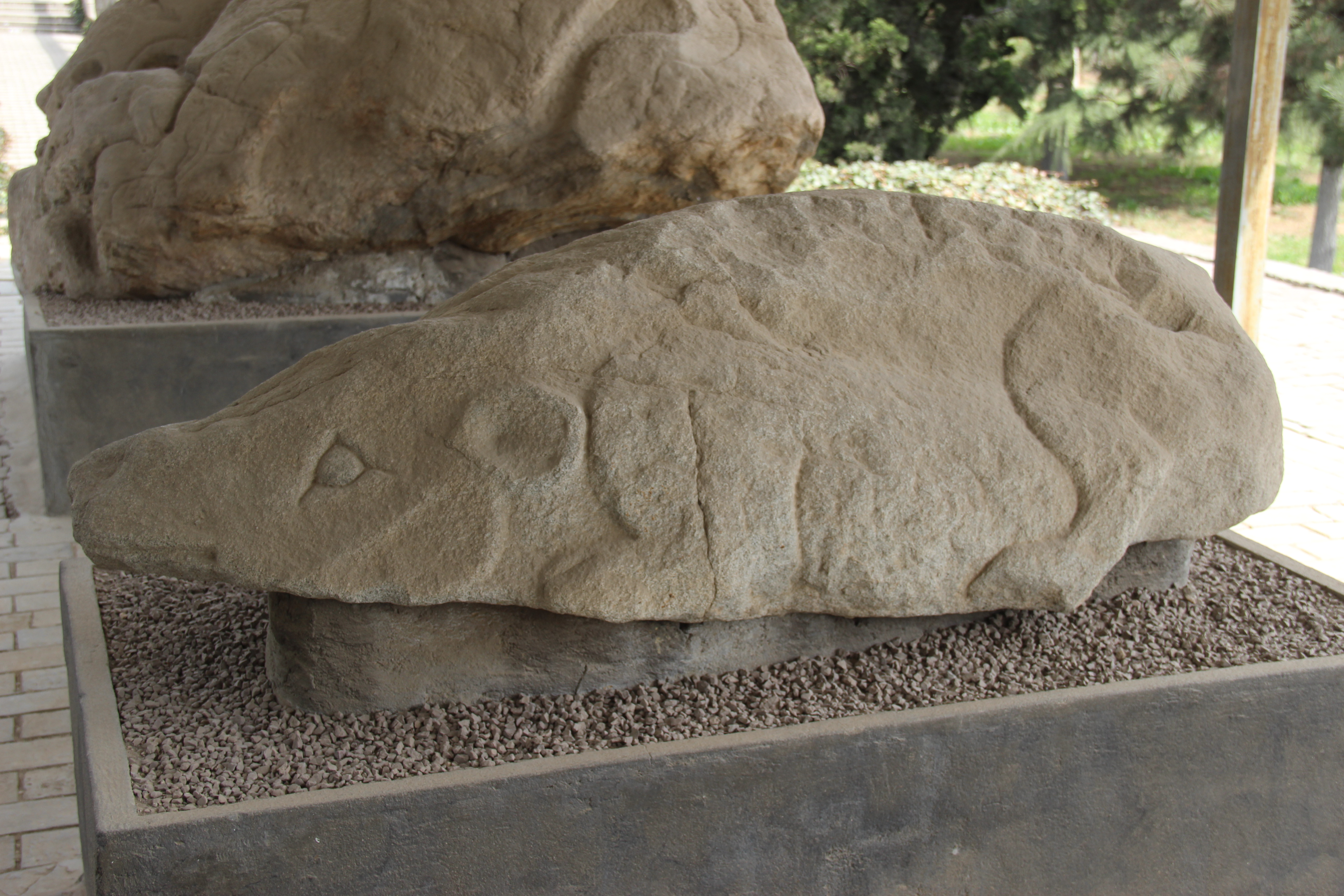
Crouching boar. Huo Qubing Mausoleum

== Buddhist sculpture ==
Chinese Buddhist sculpture has been produced throughout the history of Buddhism in China. Sculptural pieces include representations of Siddhārtha Gautama, often known as the "Enlightened One" or "Buddha", Bodhisattvas, monks, and various deities. Buddhist teachings were introduced to China as early as the 2nd century BCE, during China's Han dynasty, becoming more established during the 2nd century CE. The earliest representations were not sculptures of the human form, but rather an empty seat, footprint, tree or stupa, an architectural form that eventually inspired the creation of pagodas in China.

Sculpture began in rock-cut cave temples where carvings, mostly in relief, of images enveloped chambers and complexes, illustrating the beliefs associated with the Buddha's teachings. Creating these temples and sculptures not only garnered merit aligned to devotees' own personal growth, but gave them a reference for worship and meditative inspiration. Major rock-cut sites, with large groups of excavated caves, include the Yungang Grottoes, Longmen Grottoes, Maijishan Grottoes, and Mogao Caves.

== Gallery ==
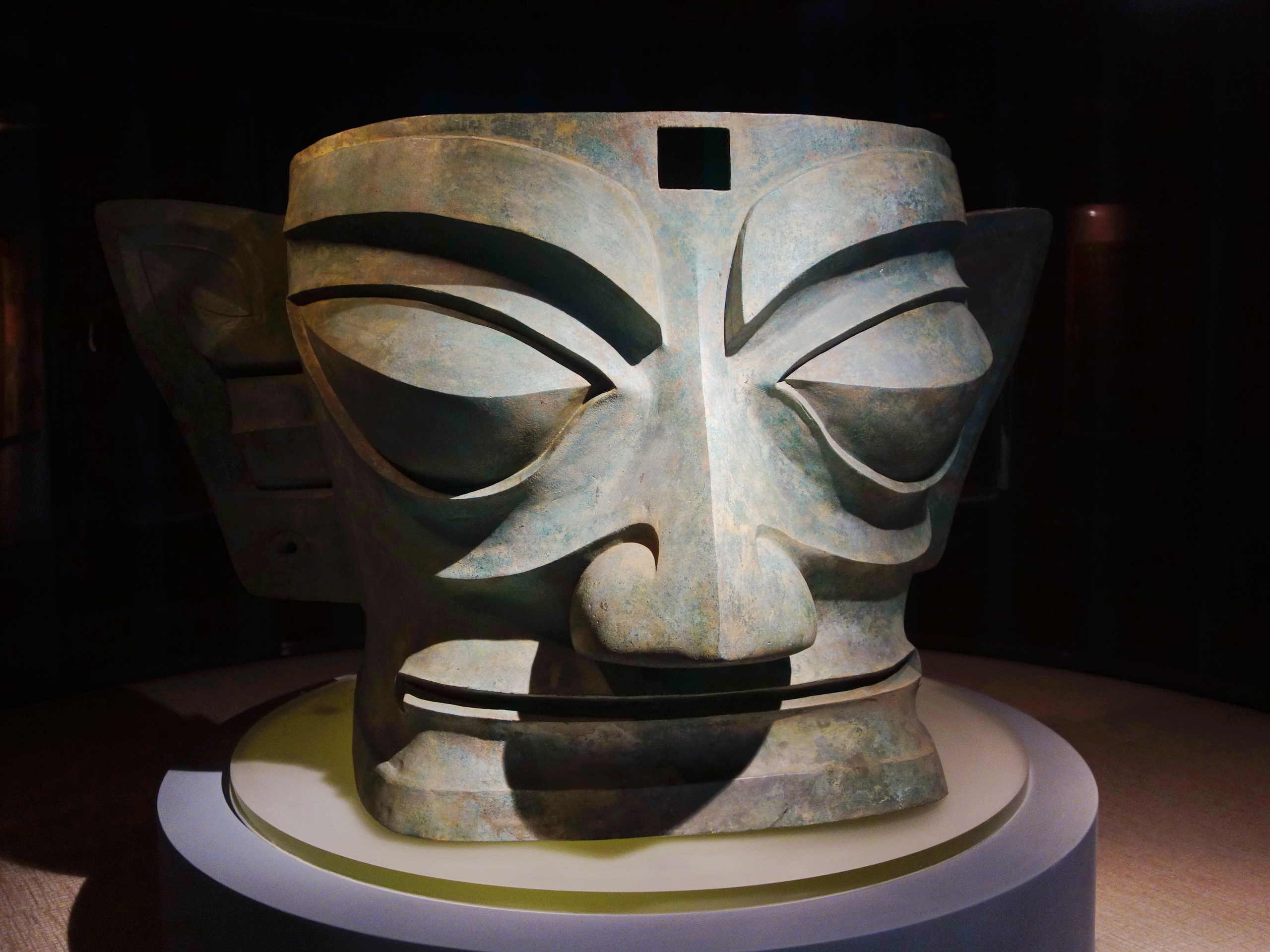
Bronze mask, from Sanxingdui, 2nd millennium BCE

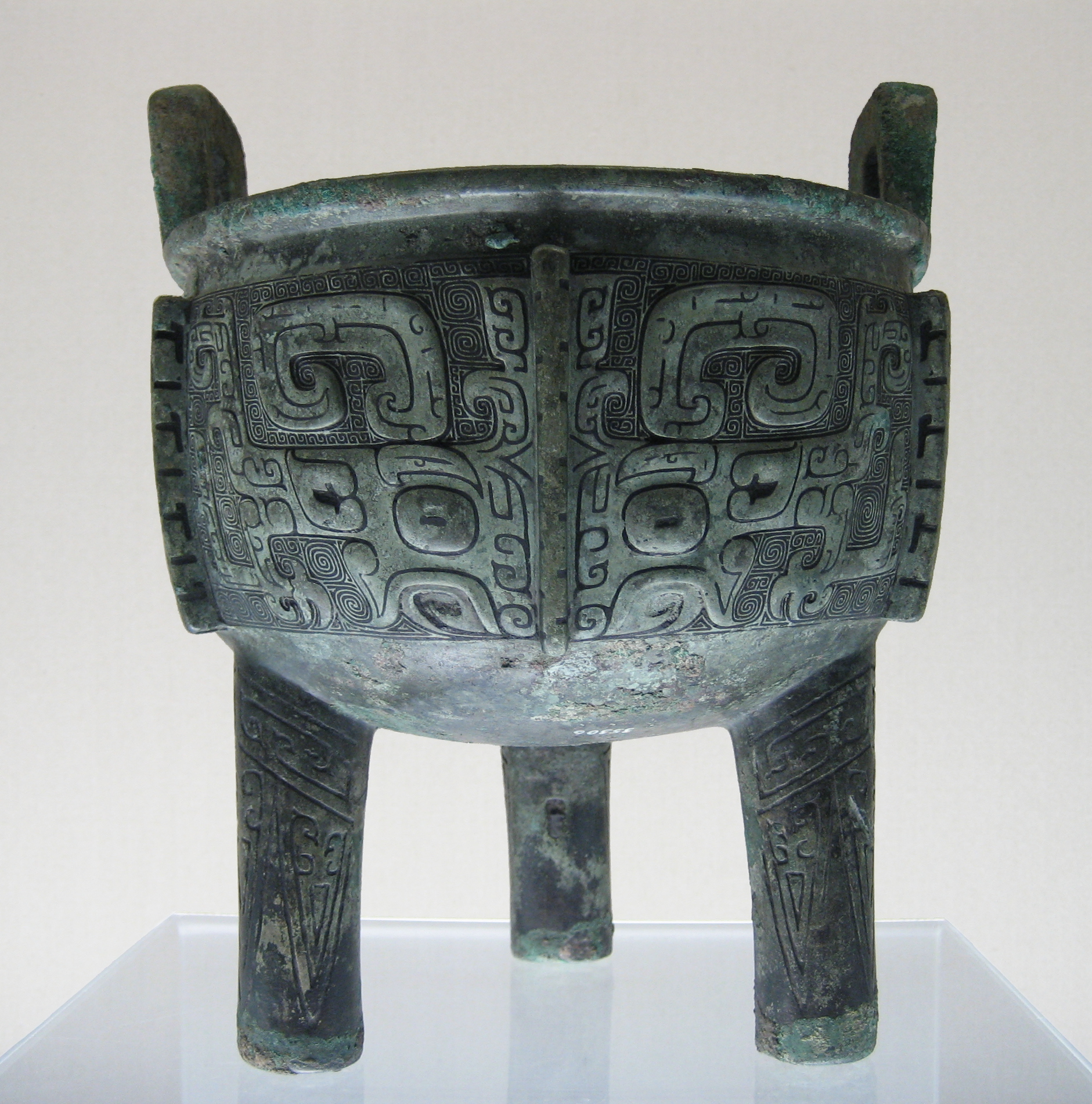
Ding with Taotie engravings from the late Shang, c. 12th century BC. (further reading - Chinese ritual bronzes)

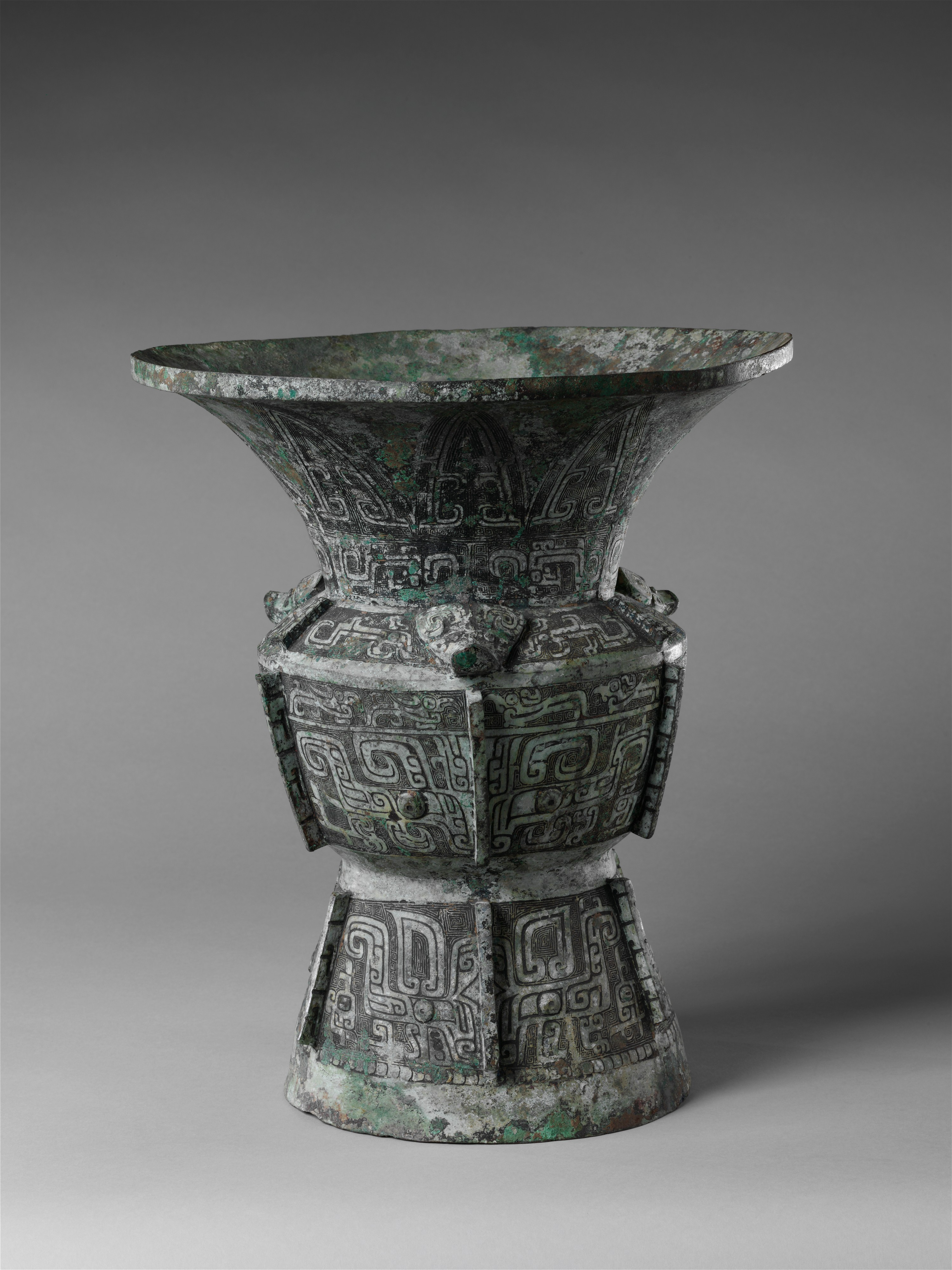
Wine vase (zun); 13th century BC; bronze inlaid with black pigment; height: 40 cm; Metropolitan Museum of Art

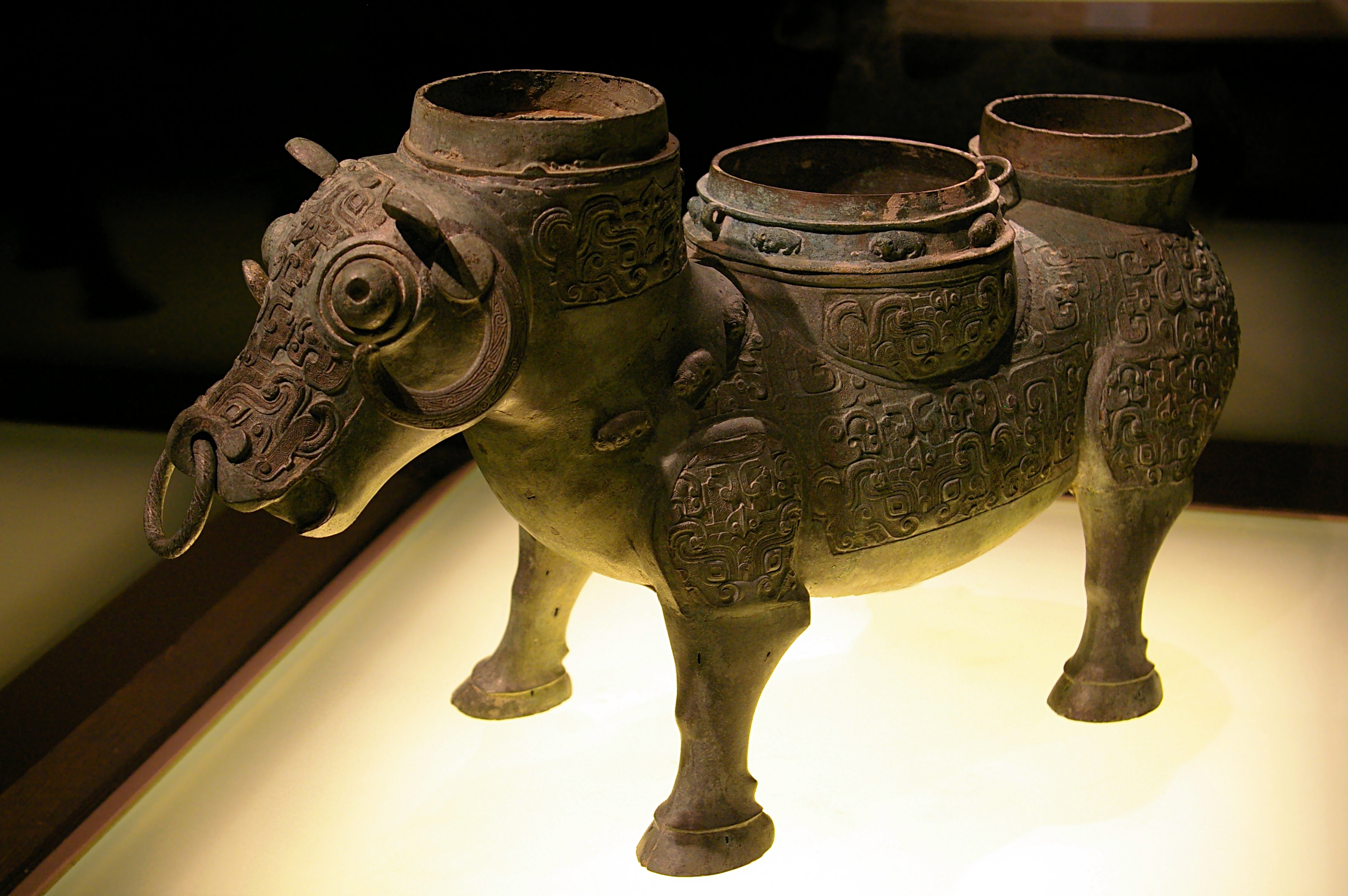
Spring and Autumn period ox-shaped vessel, 6th century BCE

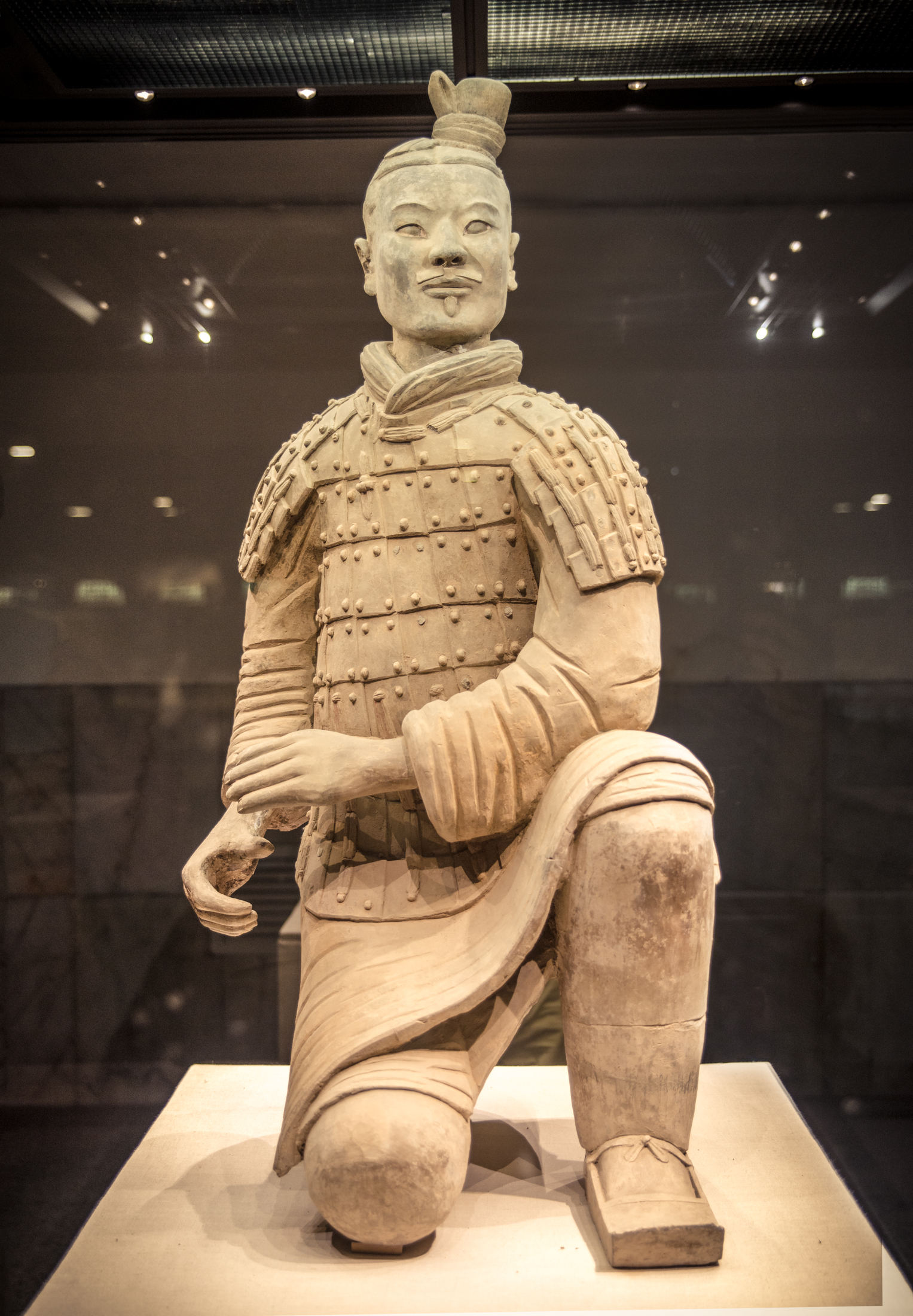
One of the warriors of the Terracotta Army, a famous collection of terracotta sculptures depicting the armies of Qin Shi Huang, the first Emperor of China

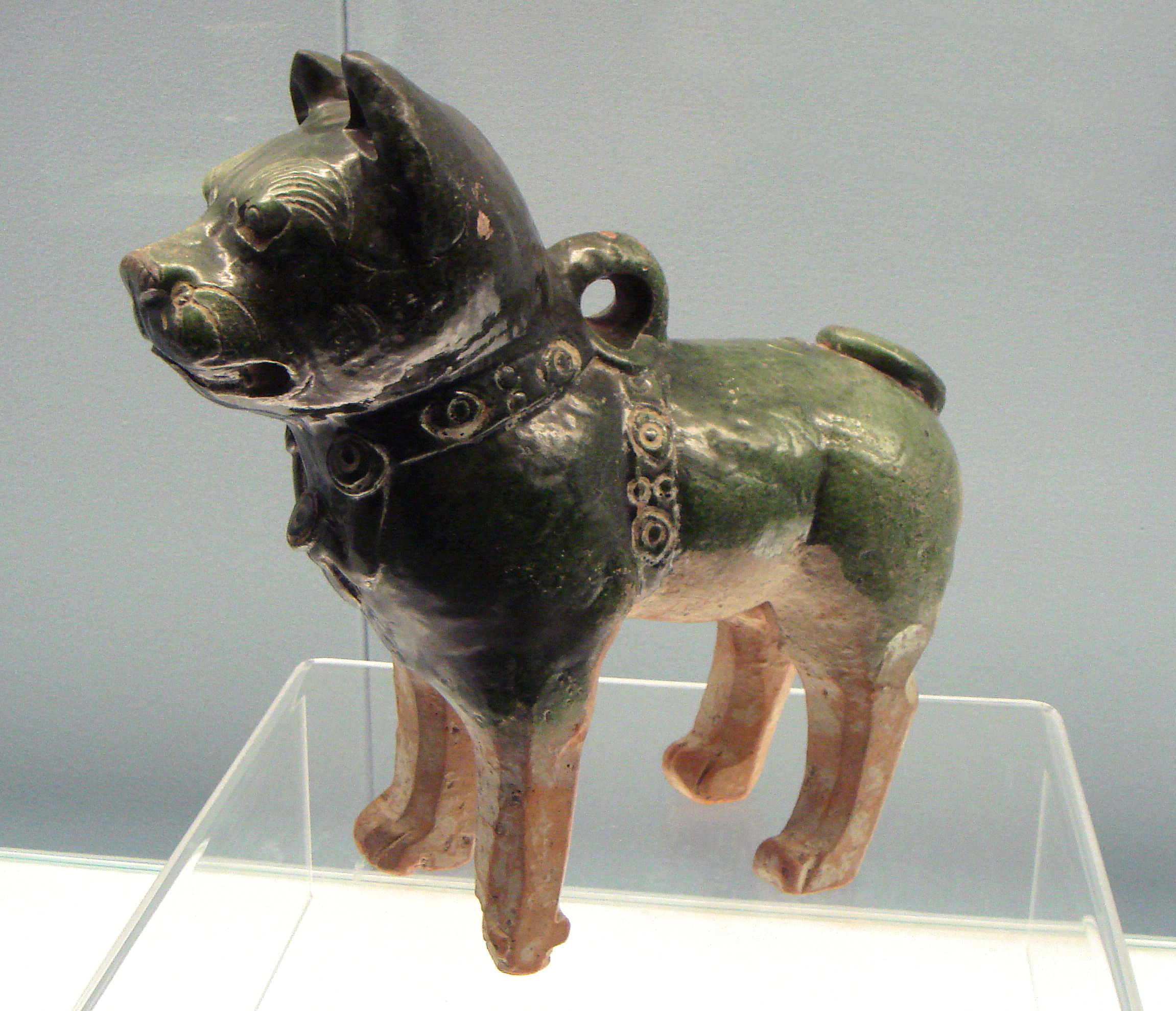
Green glazed pottery dog Eastern Han, c.1st century CE

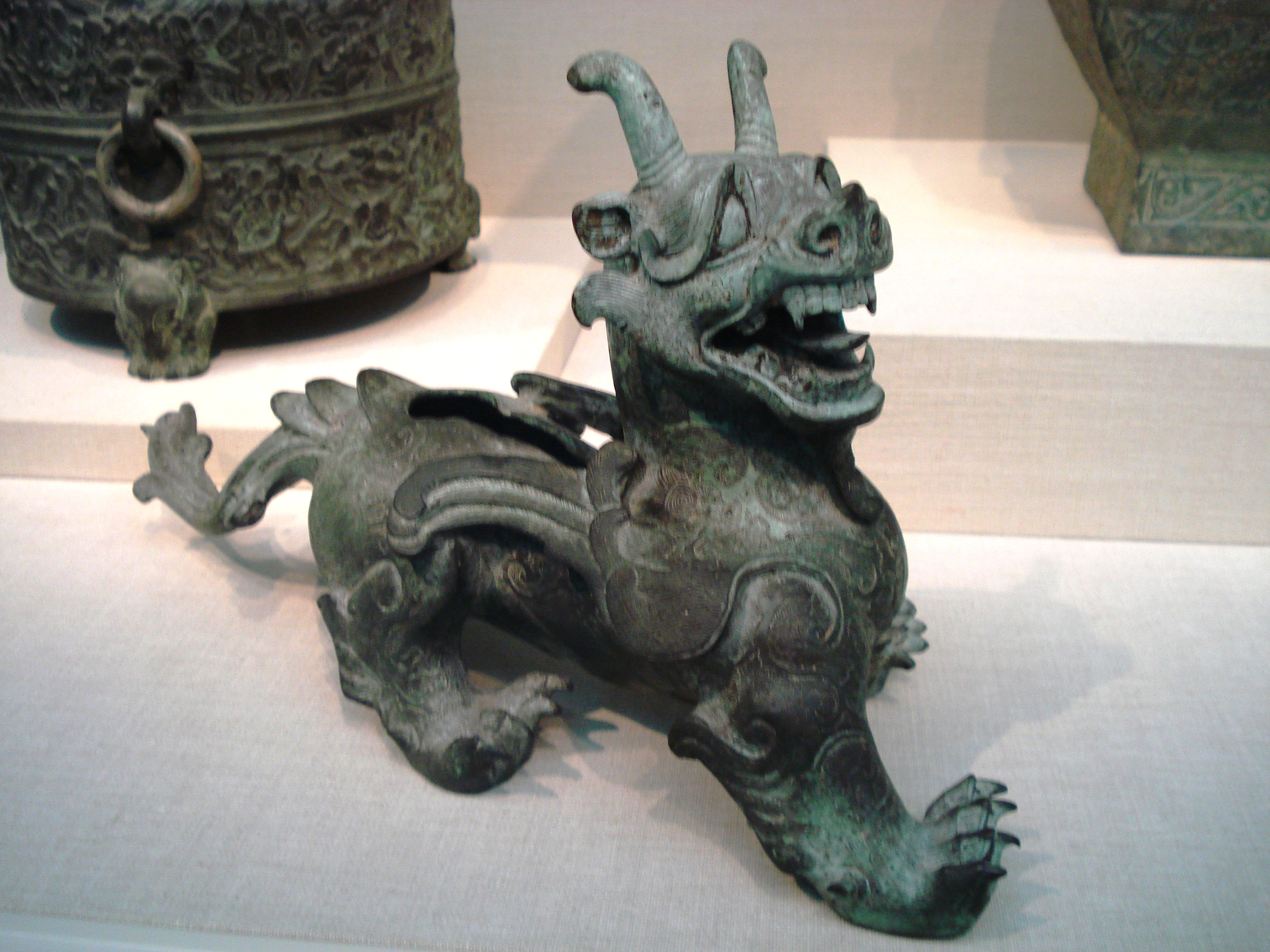
Qilin statuette, Eastern Han, 1st century CE

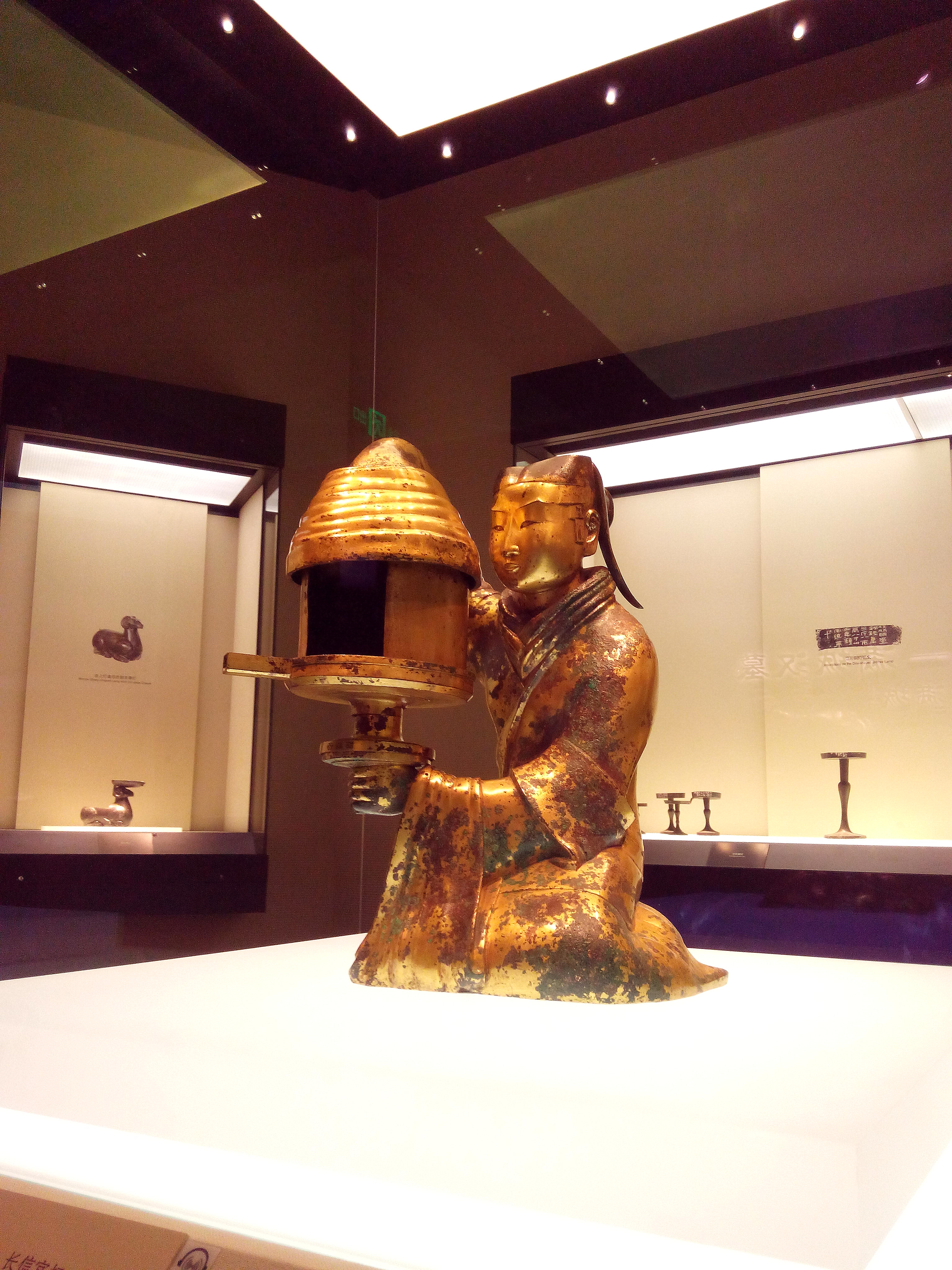
Changxin Palace lamp; circa 172 BC; bronze and gold; height: 48 cm; Hebei Provincial Museum (China); excavated from the tomb of Dou Wan

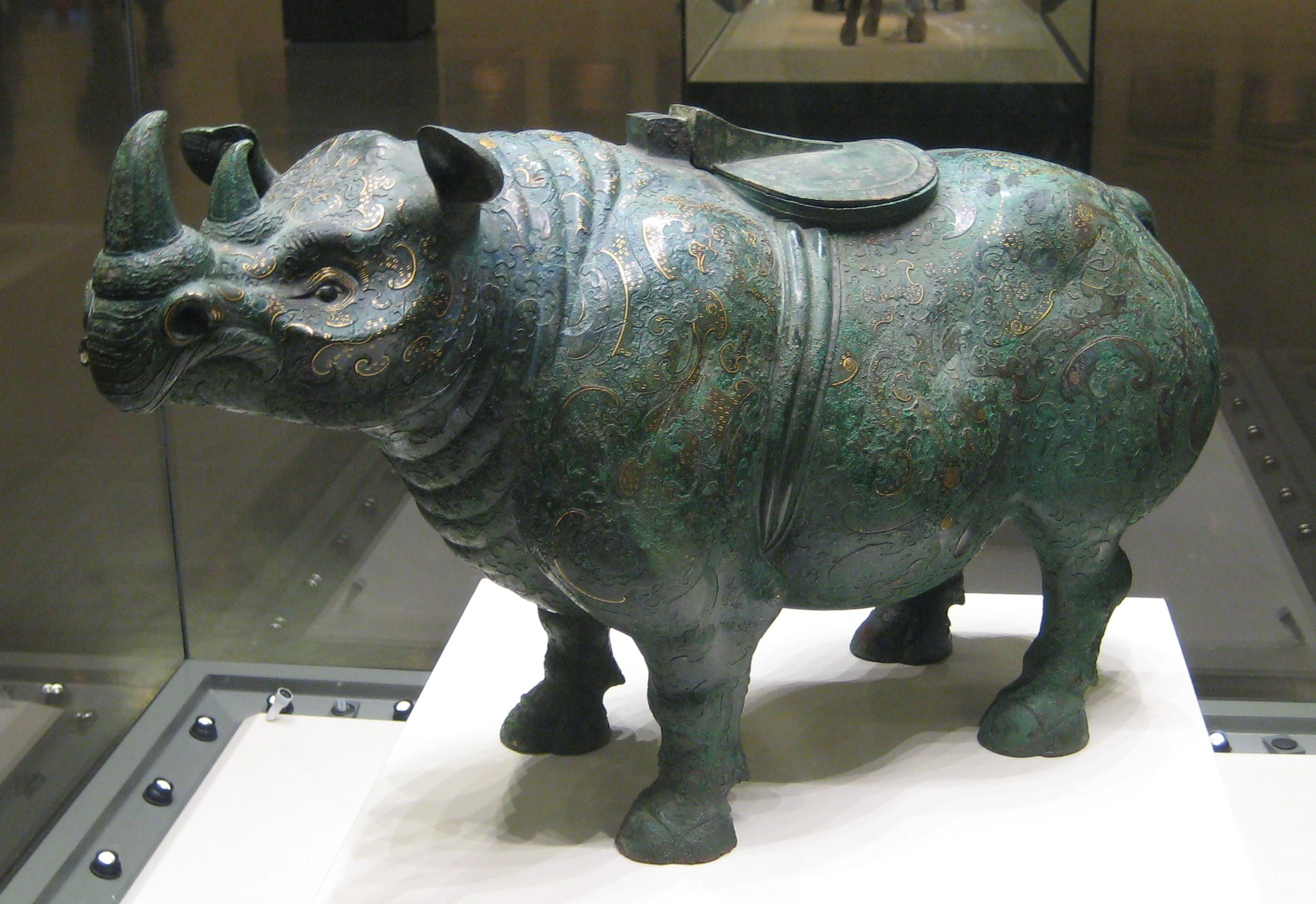
Rhinoceroses roamed the plains of ancient China; unearthed from Shaanxi, 2nd century BCE

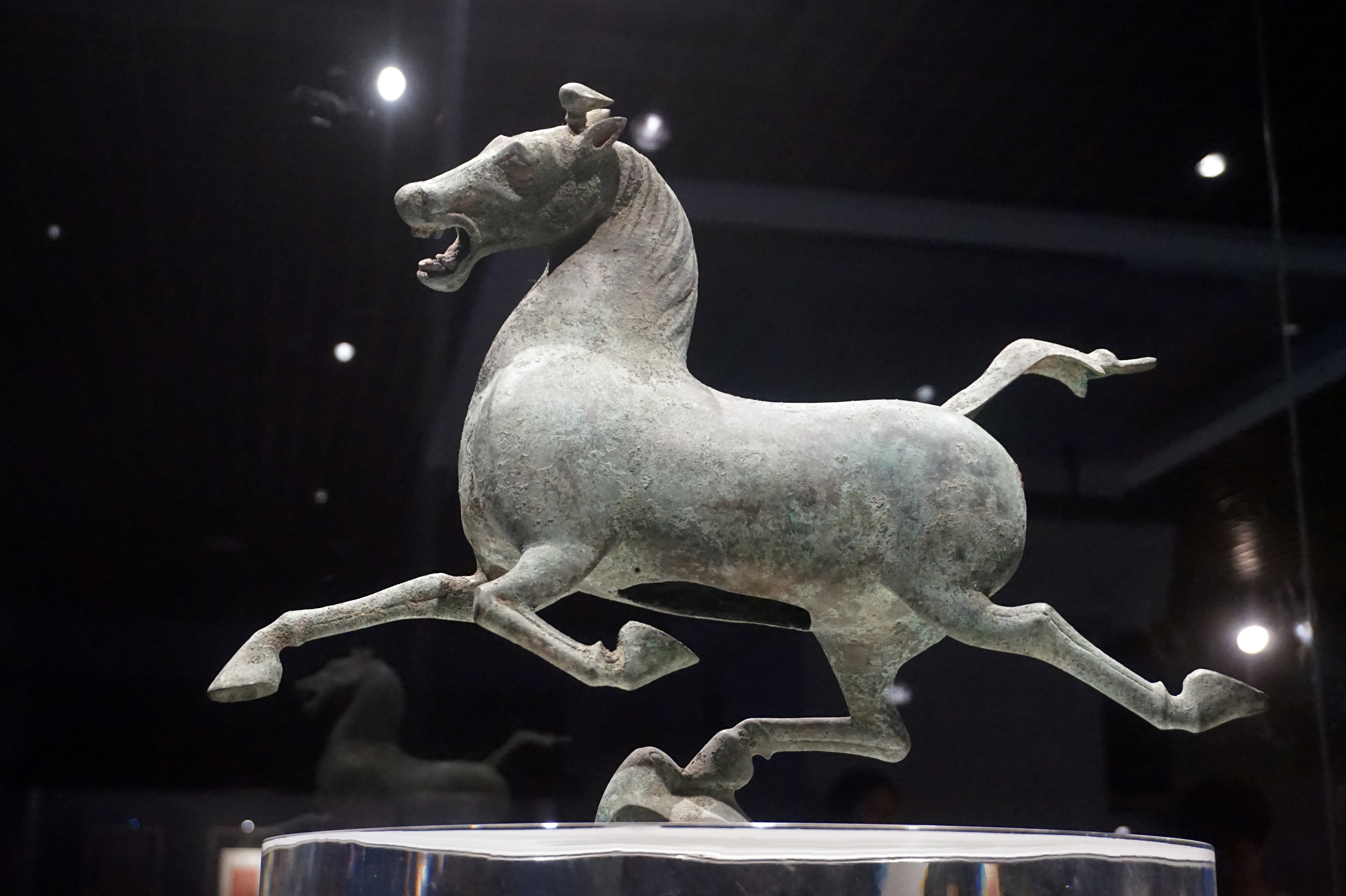
The Flying Horse of Gansu; circa 300; bronze; height: 34.5 cm, length: 45 cm; width: 13.1 cm; Gansu Provincial Museum (Lanzhou, China)

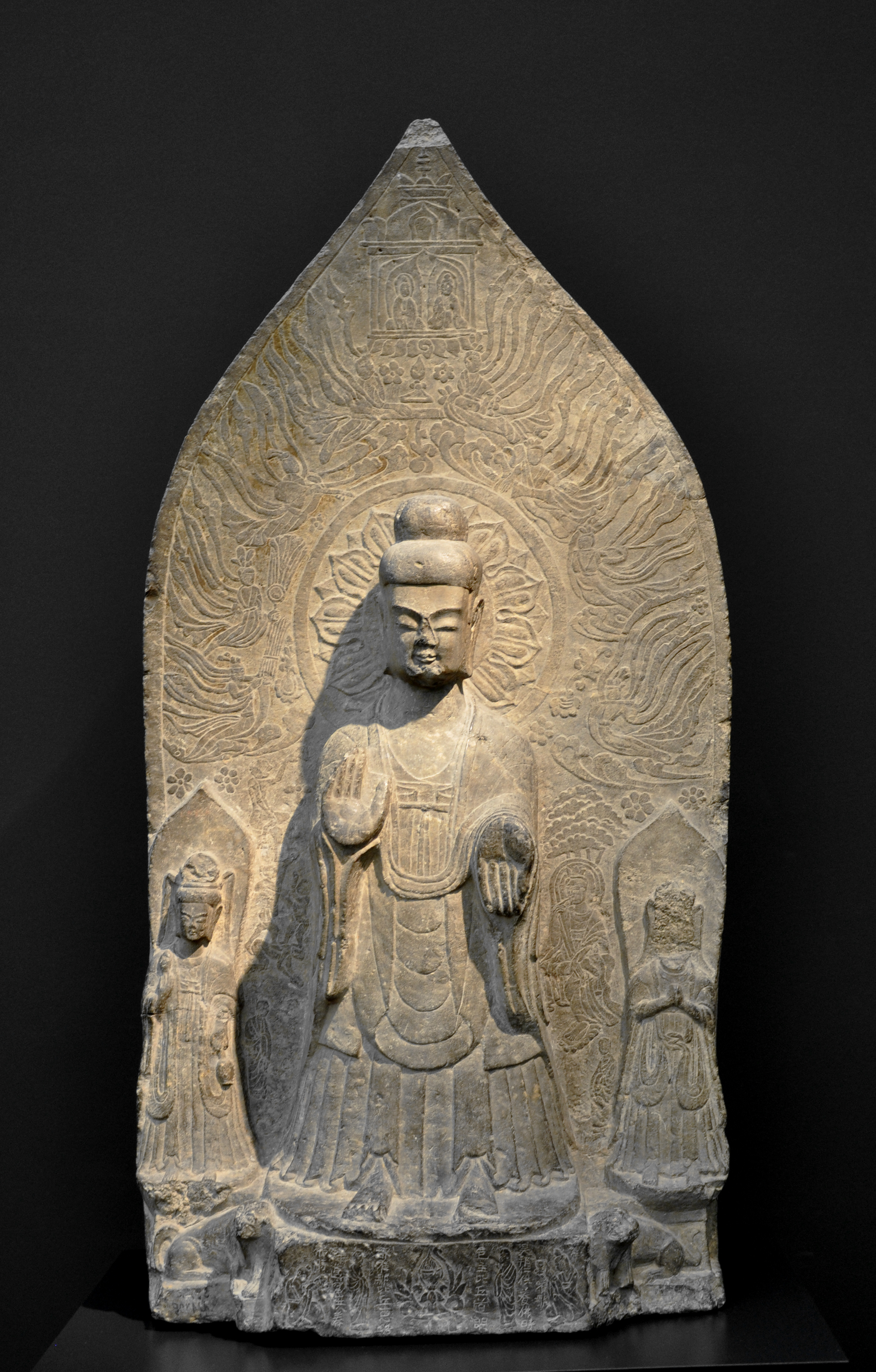
Votive stele with Buddha Shakyamuni; dated 542 (Eastern Wei dynasty); limestone; Museum Rietberg (Zürich, Switzerland)

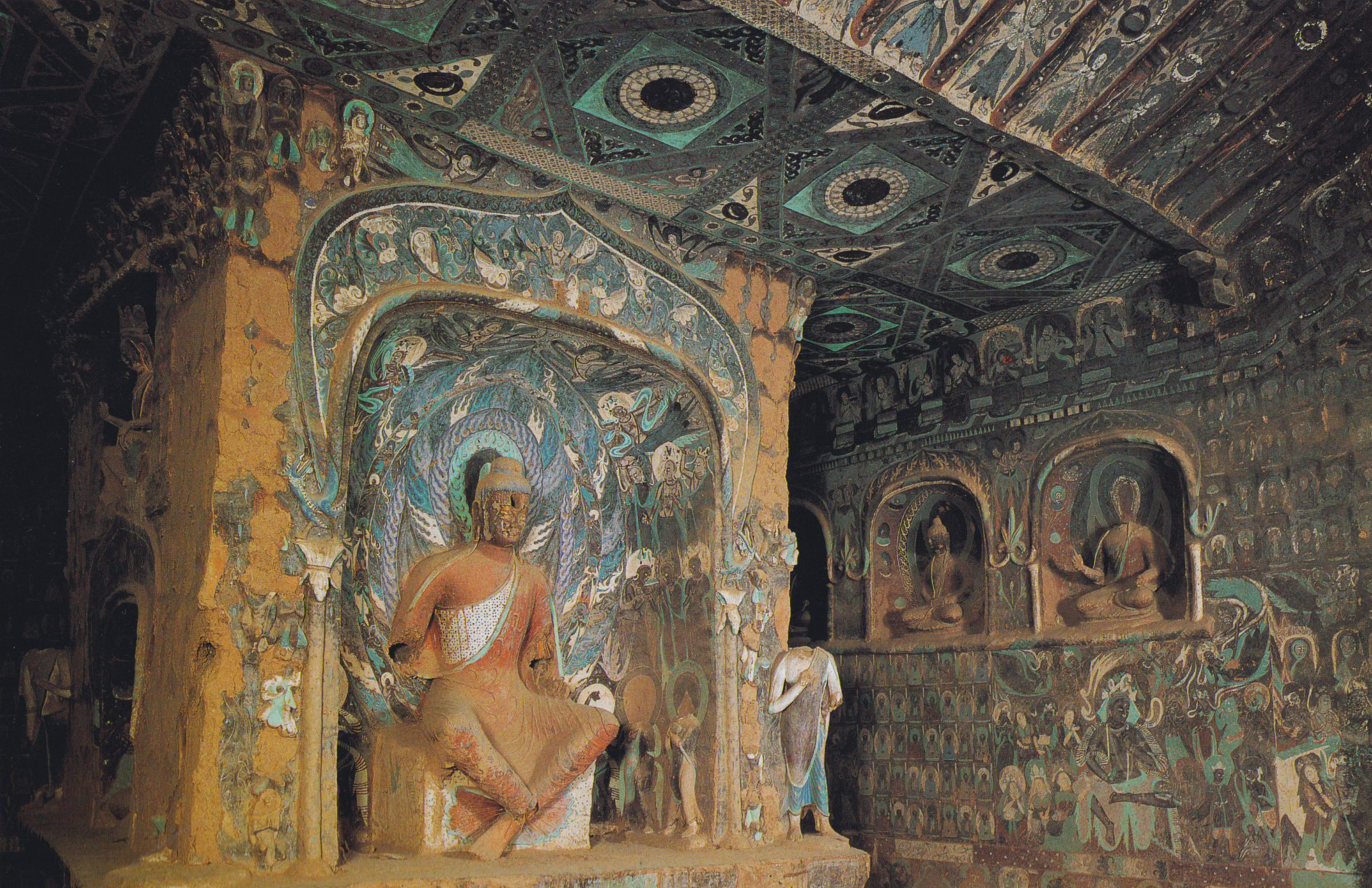
Mogao caves, Dunhuang

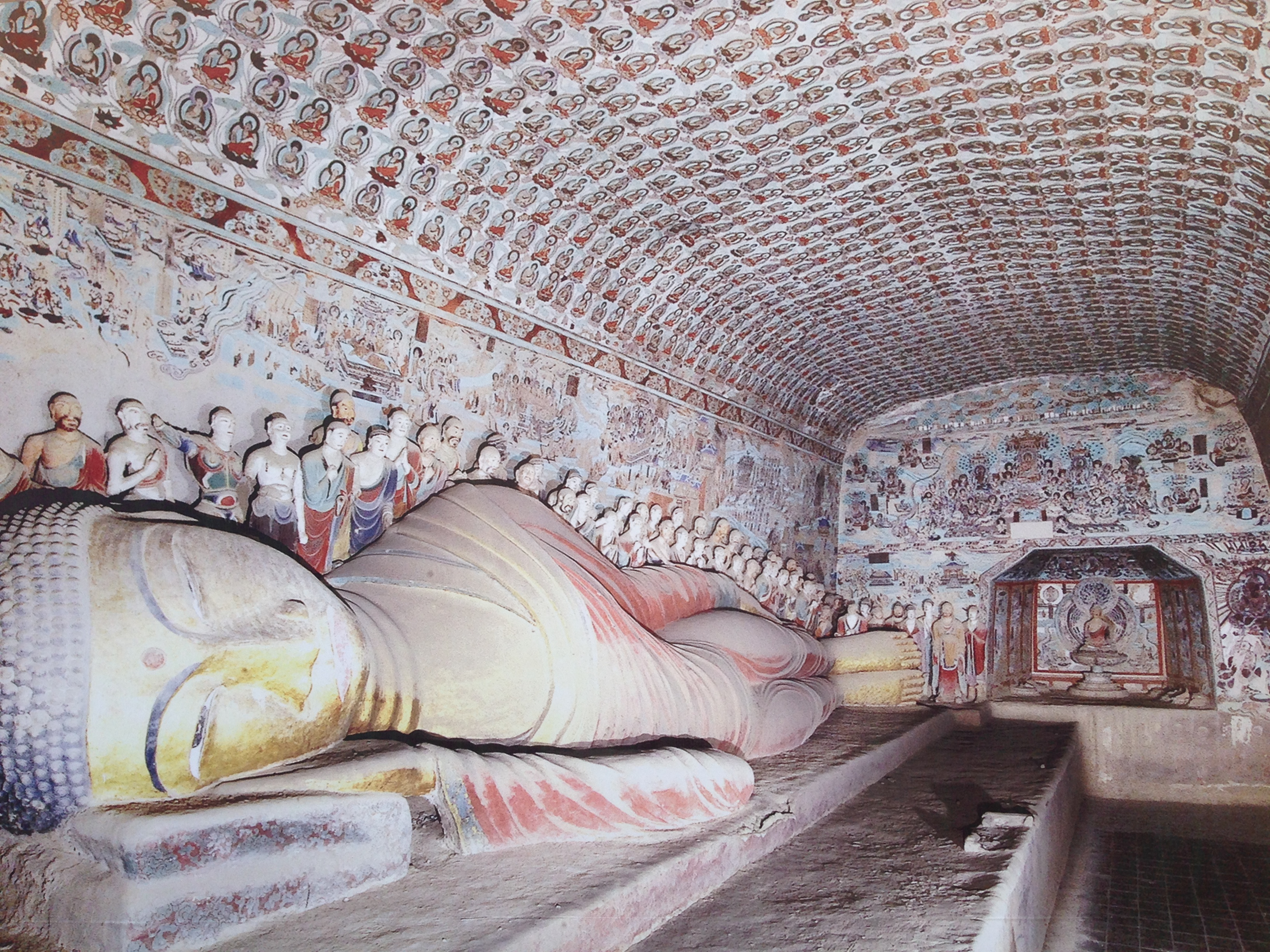
Reclining Buddha, Mogao cave

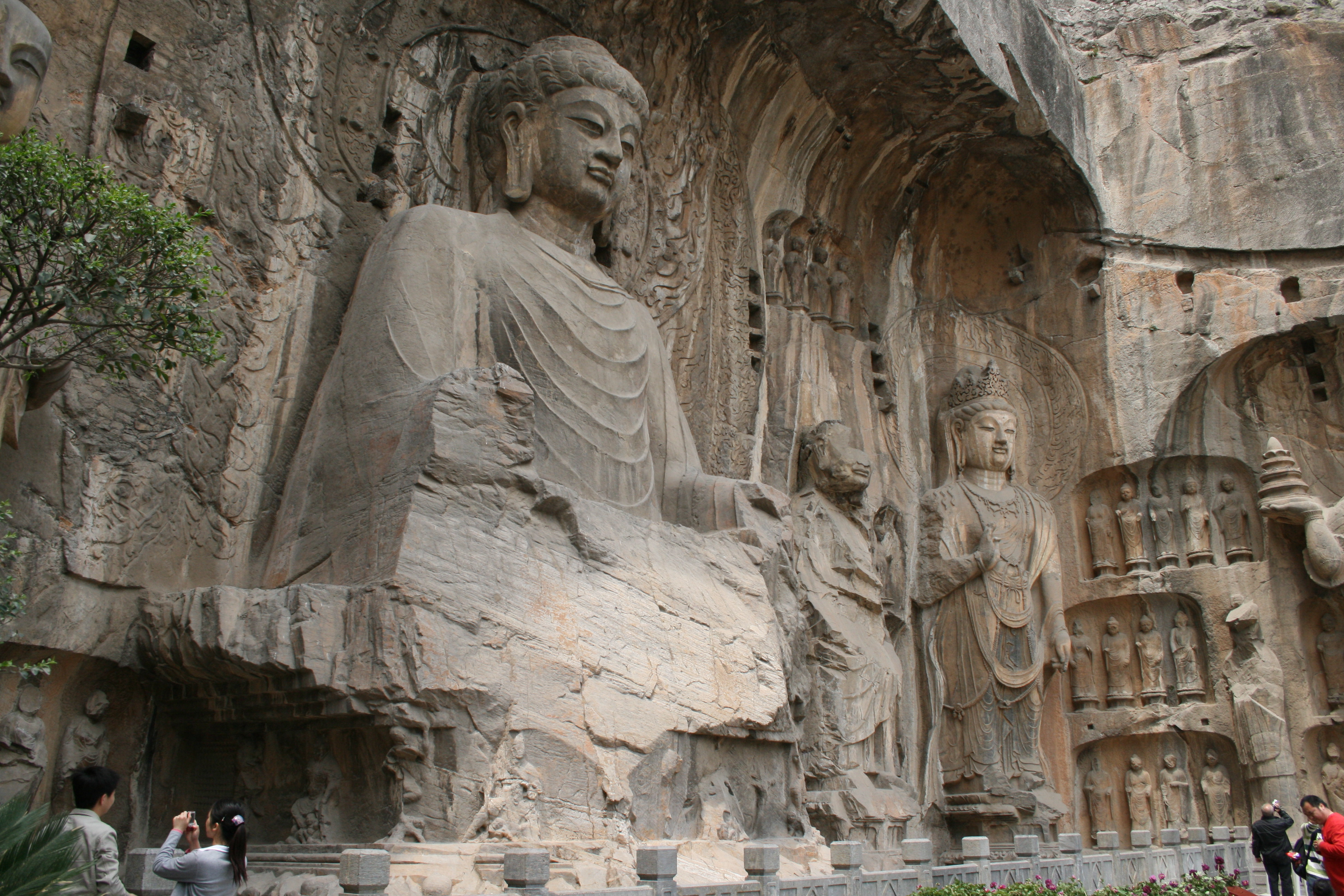
Vairocana at Longmen Grottoes, 676 CE, during the reign of Empress Wu Zetian

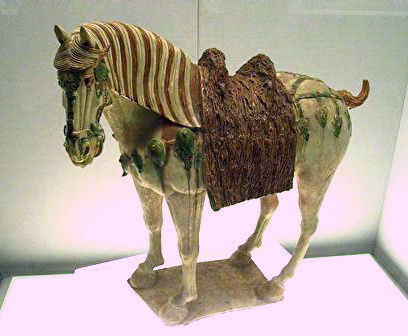
Sancai horse, Tang dynasty, c. 700 AD

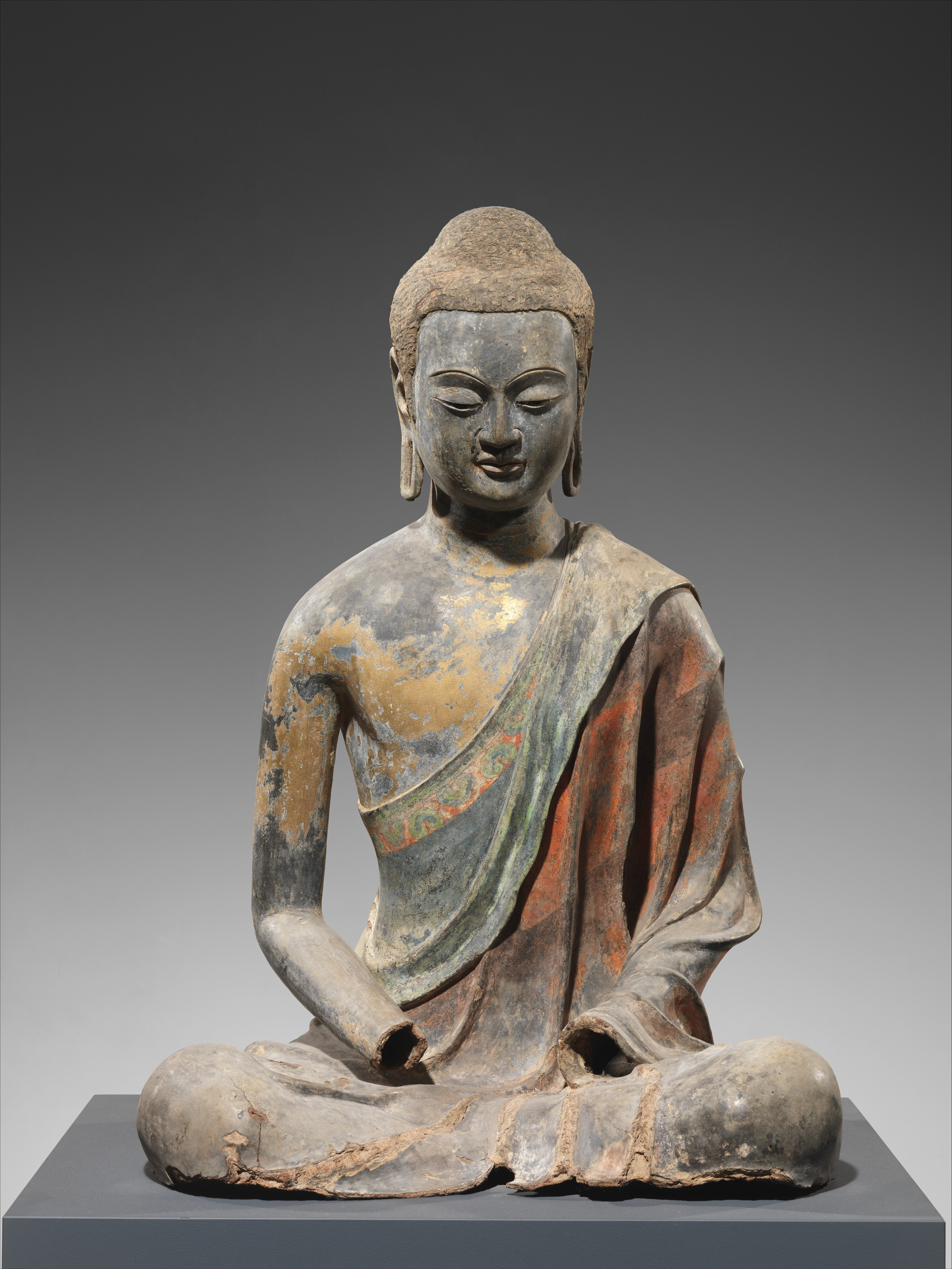
Sculpture probably of Amitābha; early 7th century; hollow dry lacquer with traces of gilt and polychrome pigment and gilding; height: 96.5 cm, width: 68.6 cm, depth: 57.1 cm; Metropolitan Museum of Art

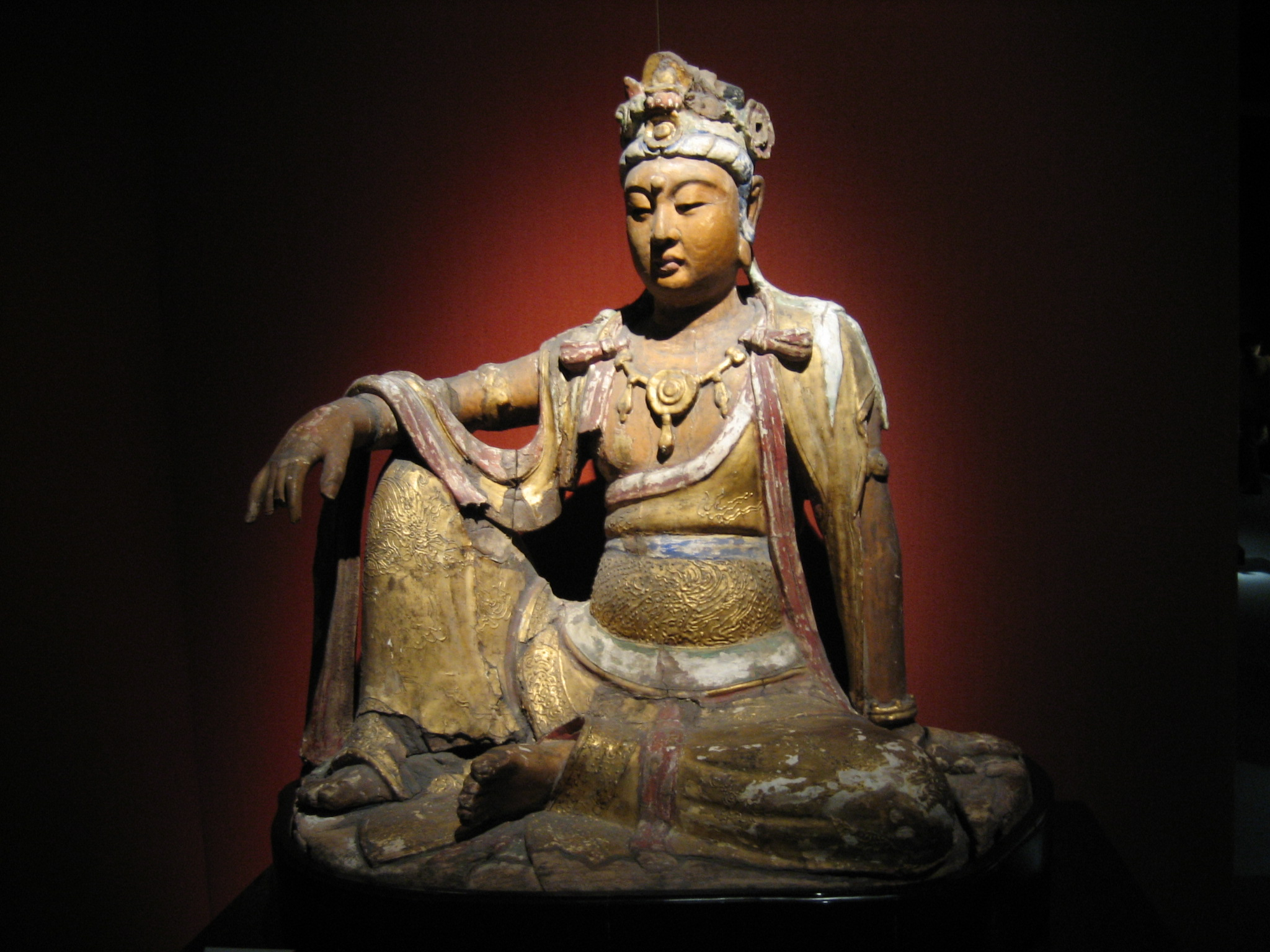
Wooden statue of Guanyin, Song dynasty

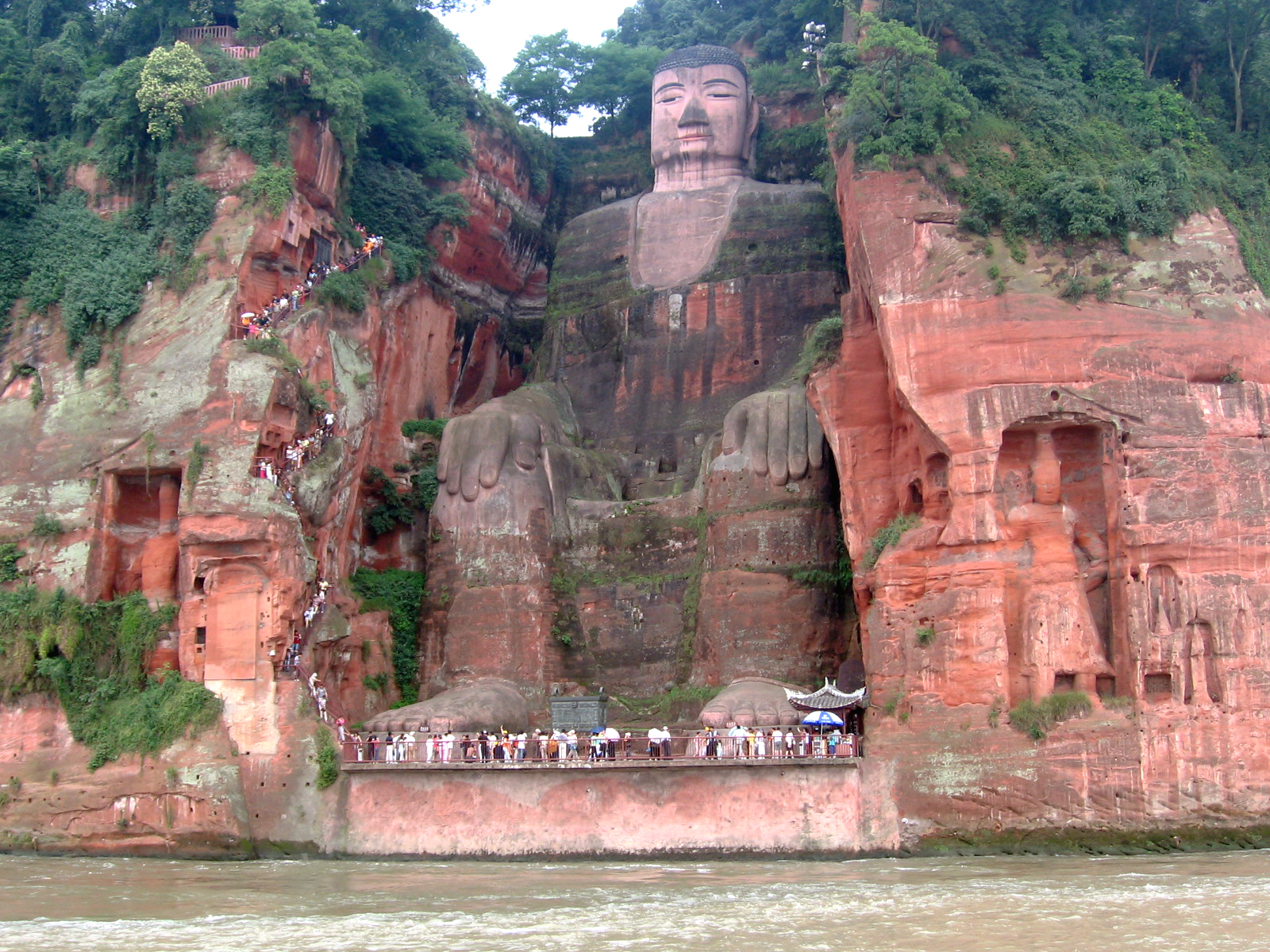
The Leshan Giant Buddha, a 71 m tall stone statue, built between 713 and 803, Tang dynasty

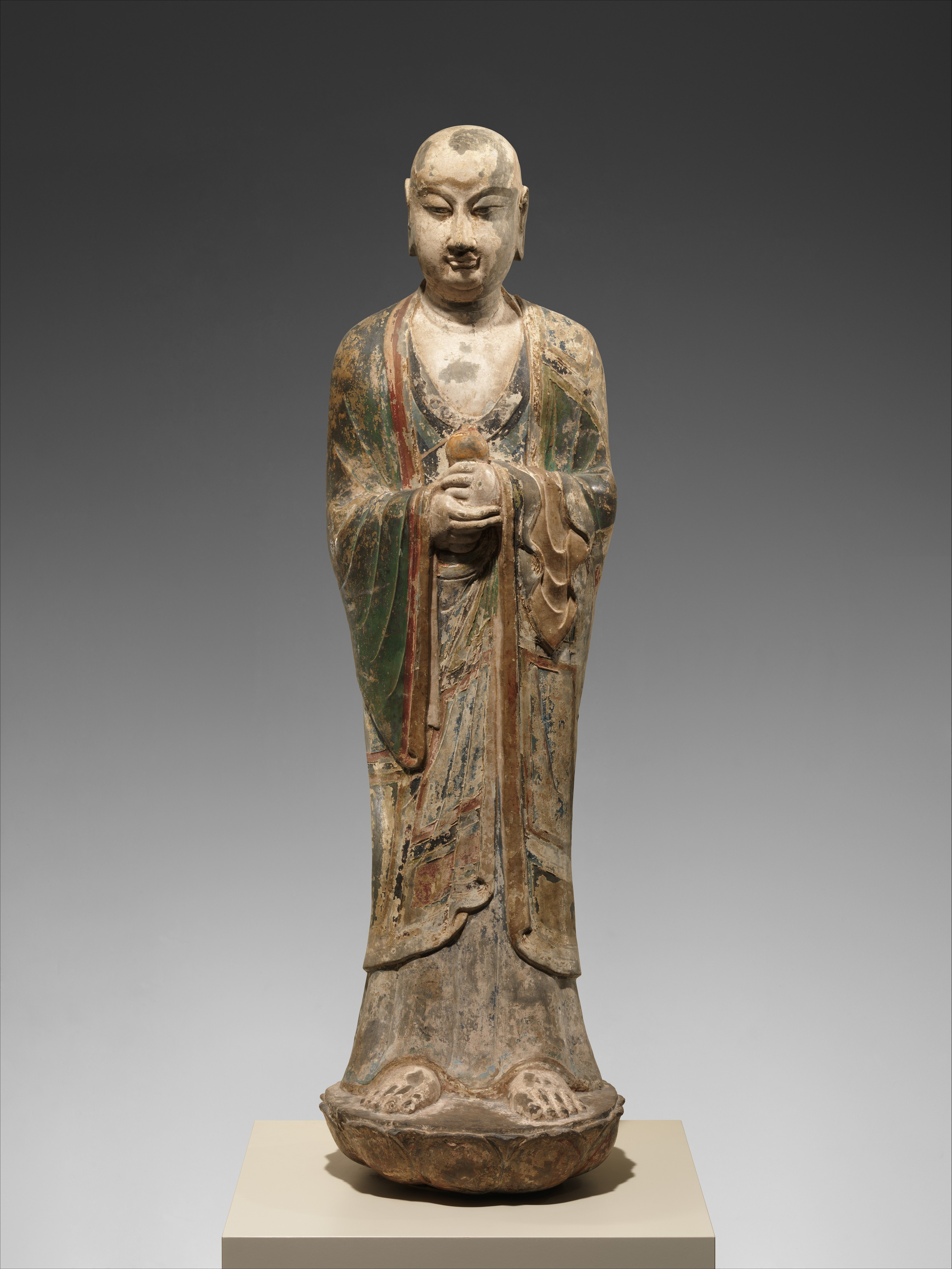
Statue of a monk; 8th century; limestone with pigment; limestone with pigment; height (including the stone dowel): 175.3 cm; Metropolitan Museum of Art

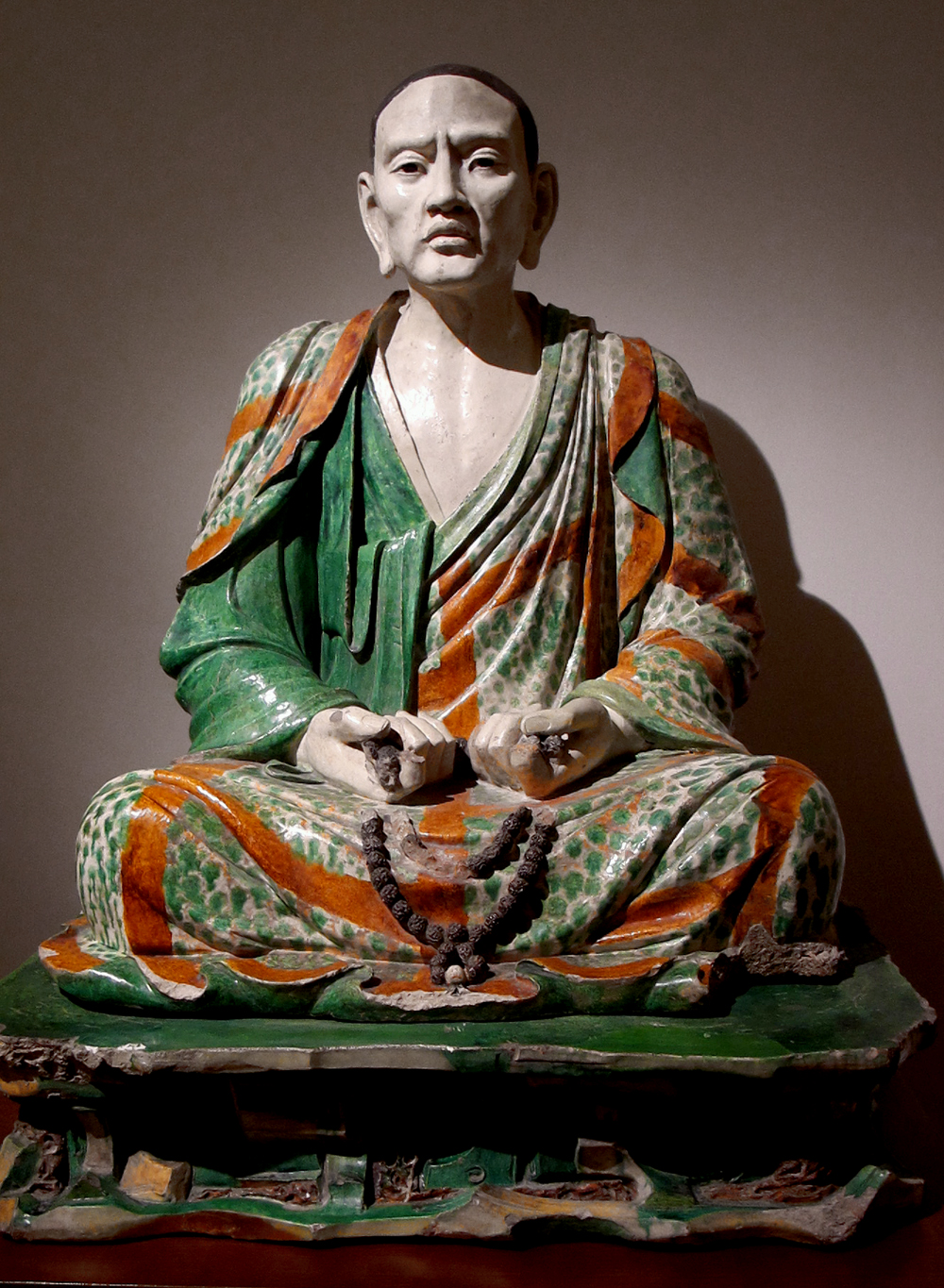
Statue of the luohan Tamrabhadra, one of the group of glazed pottery luohans from Yixian; 10th–13th century; glazed terracotta; height: 123 cm; Guimet Museum (Paris)

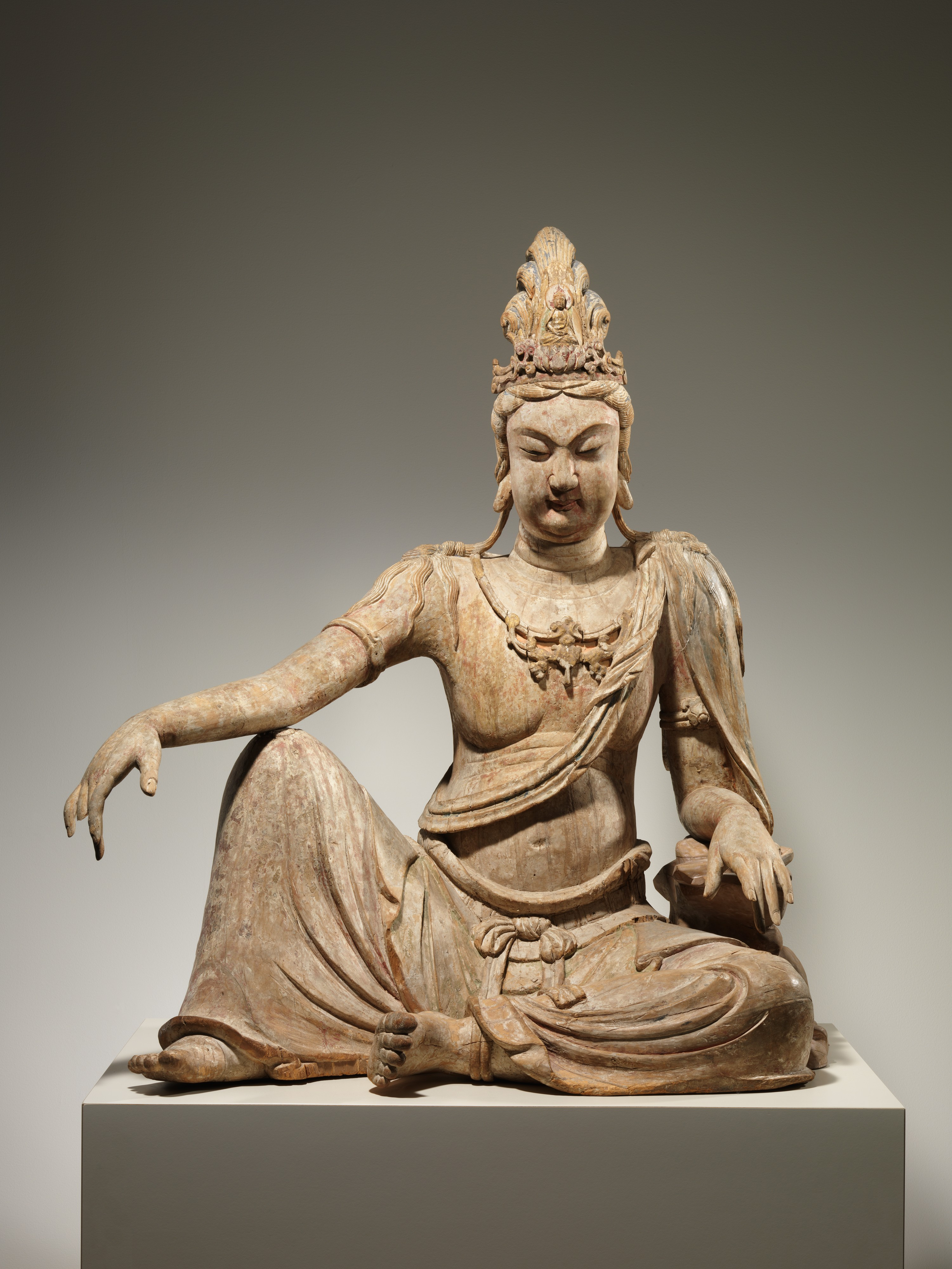
Bodhisattva Avalokiteshvara in water moon form (Shuiyue Guanyin); 11th century; wood (willow) with traces of pigment, multiple-woodblock construction; height: 118.1 cm, width: 95.3 cm, depth: 71.1 cm; Metropolitan Museum of Art

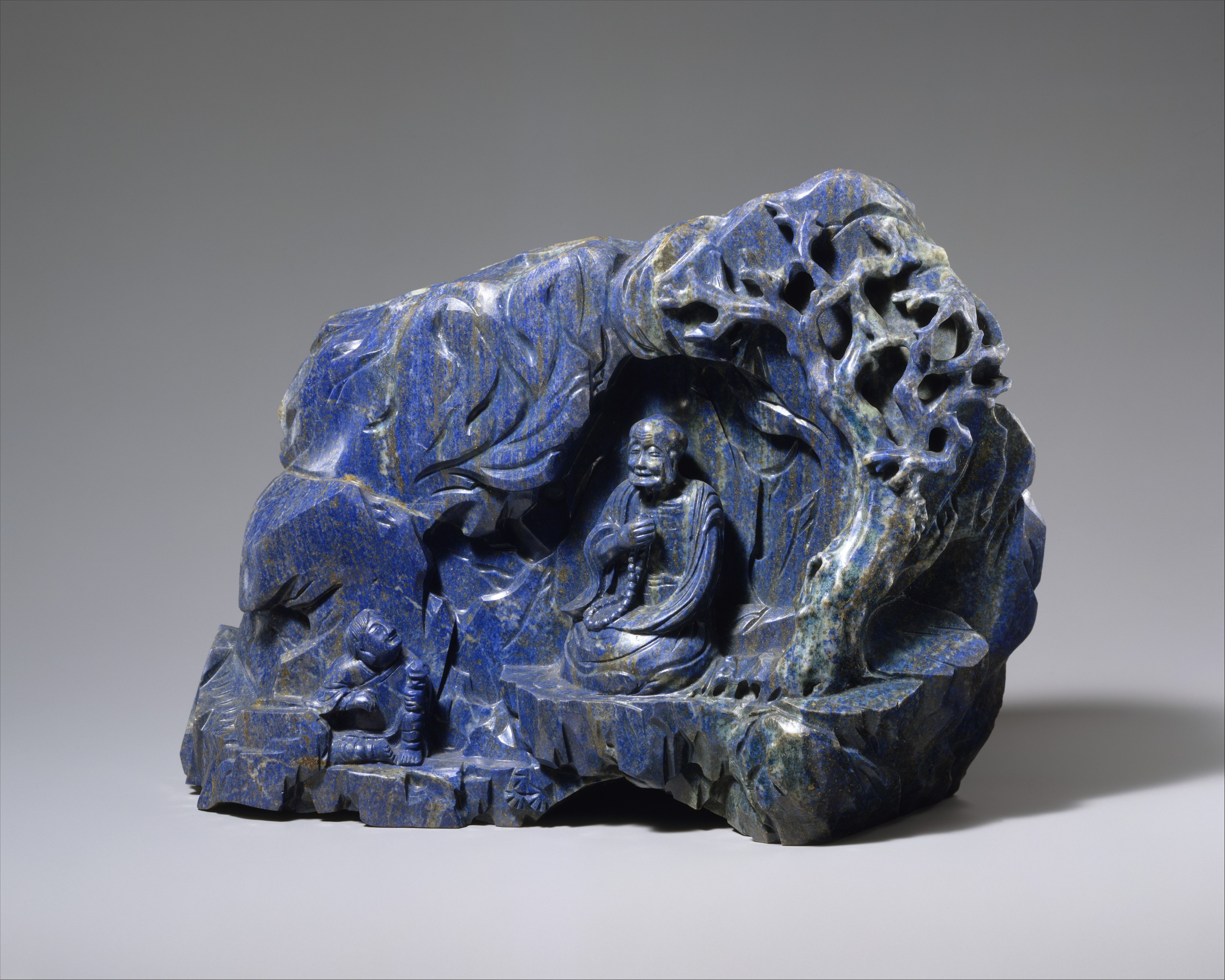
Seated luohan; 18th–19th century; lapis lazuli; height: 18.1 cm, width: 25.4 cm; Metropolitan Museum of Art

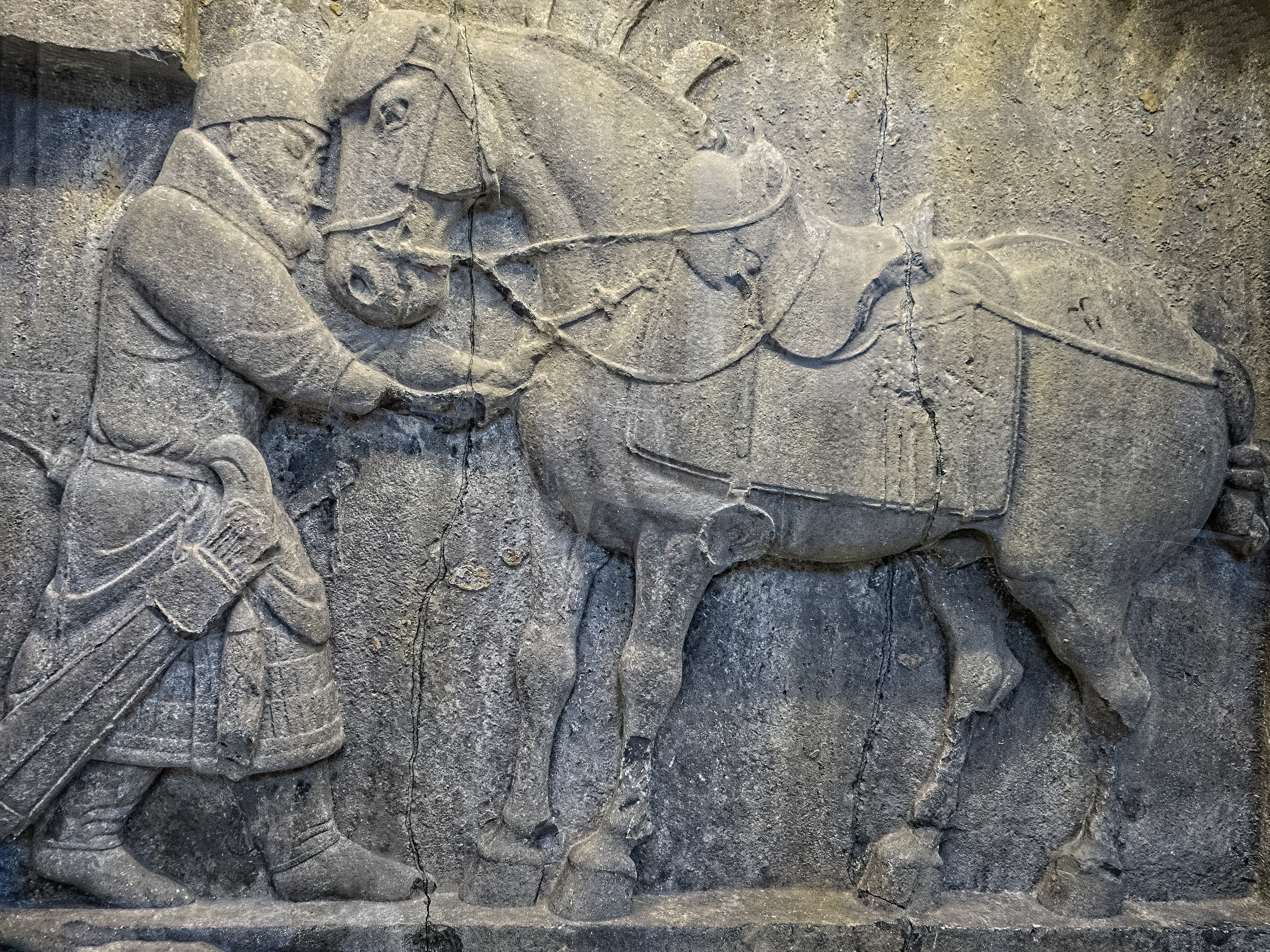
Emperor Taizong Horse Relief, Saluzi, 636-649 CE Tang Dynasty, Shaanxi Province, China. Penn Museum.

== Additional sources ==
- Edmund Capon and Mae Anna Pang, Chinese Paintings of the Ming and Qing Dynasties, Catalogue, 1981, International Cultural Corporation of Australia Ltd.
- Rawson, Jessica (ed). The British Museum Book of Chinese Art, 2007 (2nd edn), British Museum Press, ISBN 9780714124469
- Sickman, Laurence, in: Sickman L. & Soper A., The Art and Architecture of China, Pelican History of Art, 3rd ed 1971, Penguin (now Yale History of Art), LOC 70-125675
