= Tianma =

Winged horse in Chinese folklore

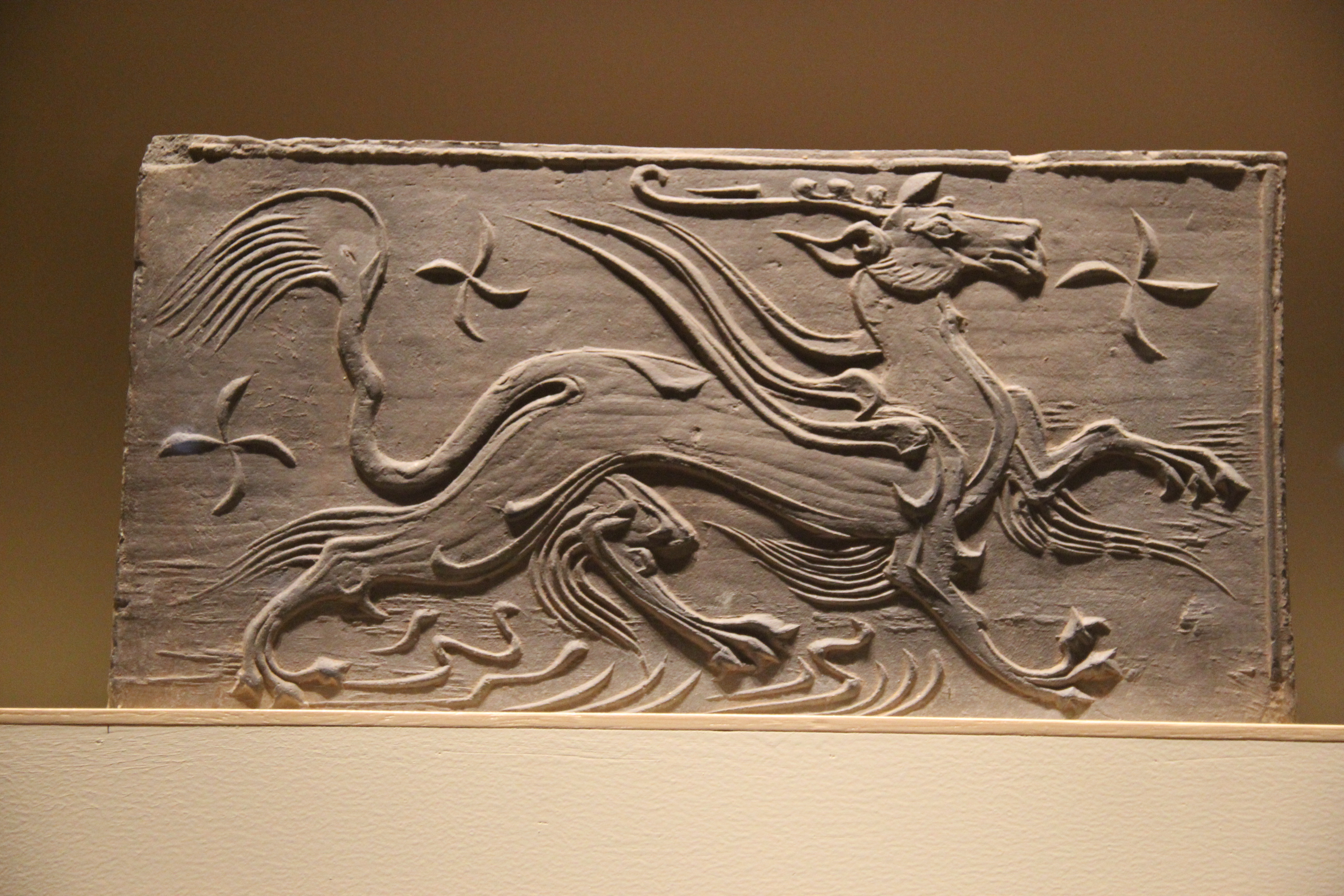
Liu Song dynasty brick-relief of a Tianma

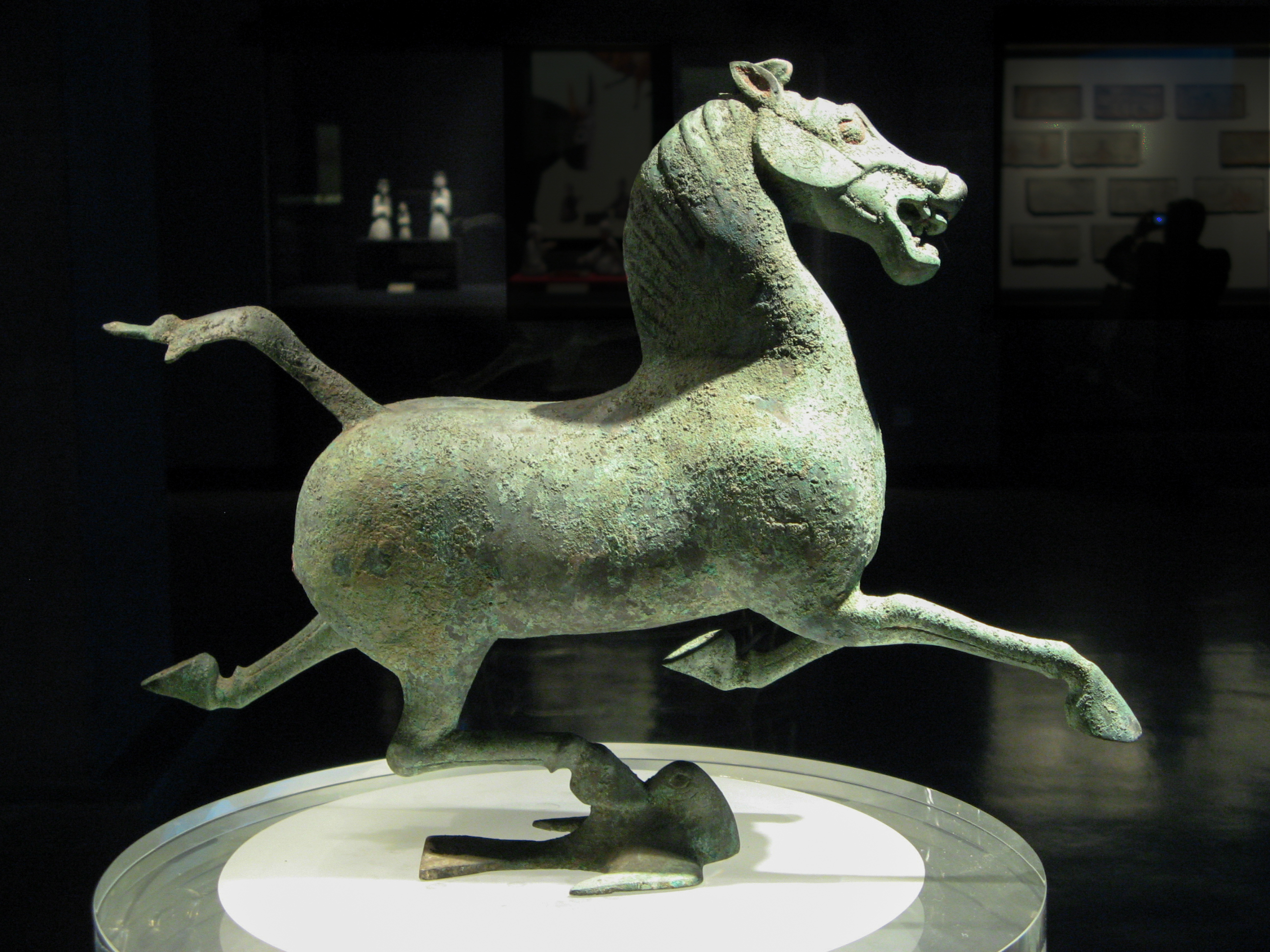
Flying Horse of Gansu, Eastern Han dynasty. Bronze. Gansu Provincial Museum.

Tianma (天馬 Tiānmǎ, "heavenly horse") was a winged (perhaps metaphorically) flying horse in Chinese folklore.

== Mythology ==
The Tianma is a flying horse that was sometimes depicted with chimerical features such as dragon scales and was at times attributed the ability to sweat blood, possibly inspired by the parasite Parafilaria multipapillosa, which infected the highly sought-after Ferghana horse (大宛馬), sometimes conflated with Tianma. Tianma, the flying horse, is clearly connected to Pegasus from the Western Han dynasty artwork and in the Tang dynasty sources, as coming from Hellenized Central Asia.

In the Western Zhou Empire, Tianma referred to a constellation. Tianma is also associated with Emperor Wu of Han, an aficionado of the Central Asian horse, and the famous poet Li Bo. The bronze statue Flying Horse of Gansu is a well-known example.

== Depiction in media works ==
A few Tianma appear in the Chinese manhua and animated series You Shou Yan, however they are changed to dogs.

== See also ==
- War of the Heavenly Horses
- Horse in Chinese mythology
- Shanghai Tianma Circuit
