= Flying Horse of Gansu =

Chinese bronze sculpture

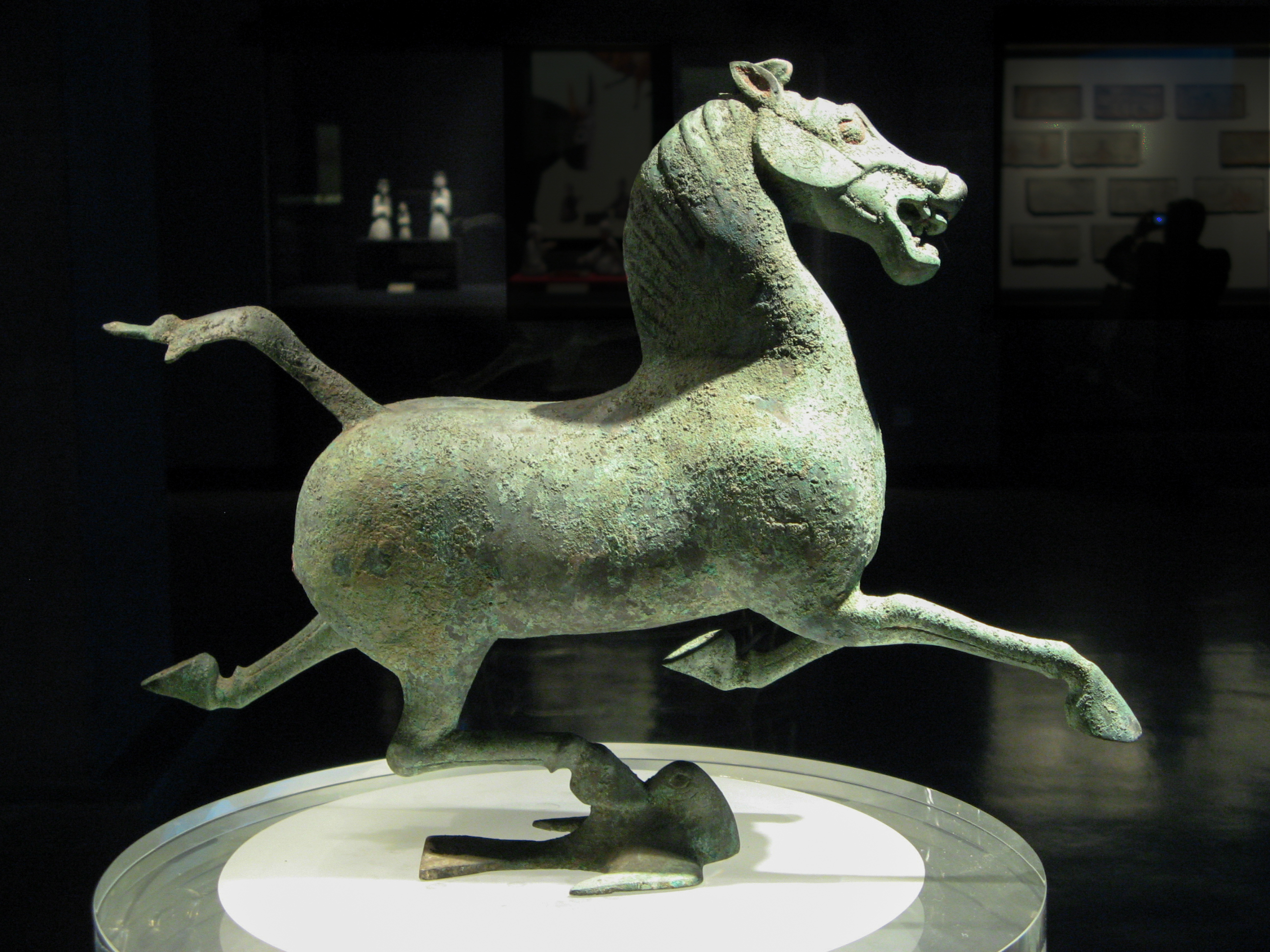
- Artist: Unknown
- Year: Eastern Han period Circa 200 CE
- Location: Gansu Provincial Museum, Lanzhou

The Flying Horse of Gansu, also known as the Bronze Running Horse (銅奔馬) or the Galloping Horse Treading on a Flying Swallow (馬踏飛燕), is a Chinese bronze sculpture from circa the 2nd century CE. Discovered in 1969 near the city of Wuwei, in the province of Gansu, it is now in the Gansu Provincial Museum. "Perfectly balanced," says one authority, "on the one hoof which rests without pressure on a flying swallow, it is a remarkable example of three-dimensional form and of animal portraiture with the head vividly expressing mettlesome vigor."

== Description ==
The statue is made from bronze. It is 34.5 cm in height, 45 cm in length, and 13.1 cm in width.

The horse in the bronze is a breed brought back from Fergana by a punitive expedition sent by Emperor Han Wudi in 104 BCE. These "celestial horses" were highly prized as marks of status.

== Discovery and world fame ==
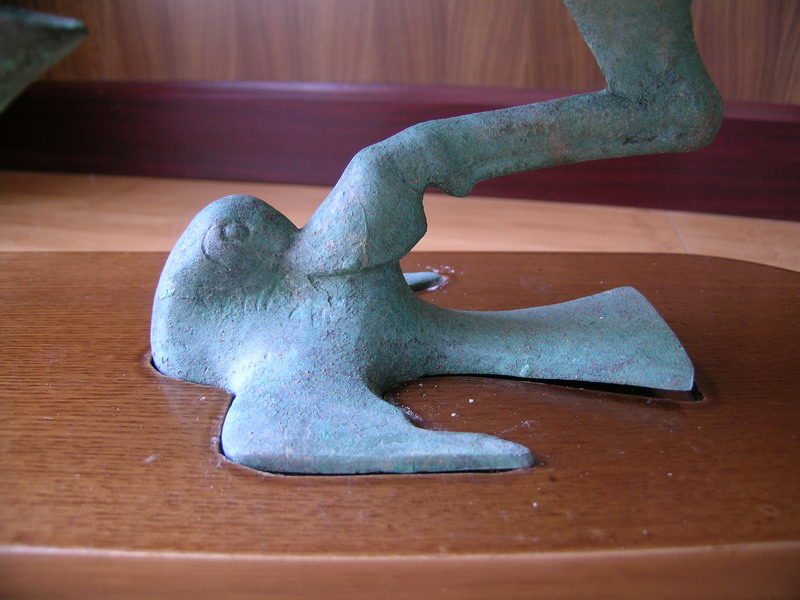
Detail of the foot and swallow (replica)

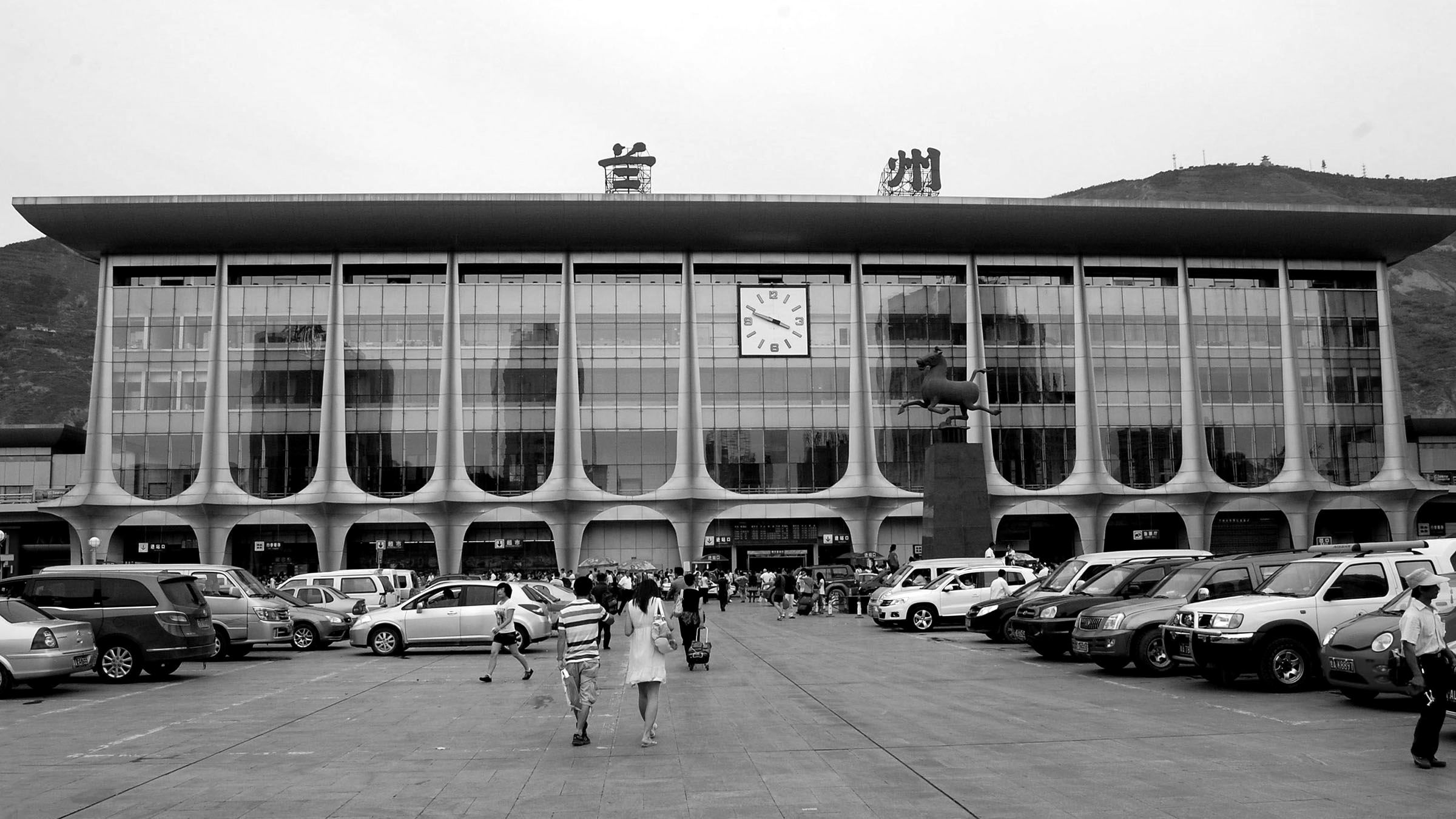
A copy of the sculpture is located on the front square of Lanzhou railway station.

The Flying Horse of Gansu was discovered in 1969. It was unearthed from a Han tomb at Leitai in Wuwei. The tomb belonged to General Zhang of Zhangye.

The discovery was made by a team of locals who had been told to dig air-raid shelters in the case of an imminent war with the Soviet Union. During the excavations, they found a chamber under a monastery which held a group of over 200 bronze figurines of men, horses, and chariots, which they put in plastic bags and took home.

They later realized the importance of their find and reported it to provincial authorities. Professional archaeologists then took up the excavations. They discovered a three-chambered tomb which had apparently been entered by looters soon after the original burial some 2,000 years earlier. The looters had not, however, entered the chamber in which the bronzes were found. The archaeologists determined that the opulent tomb was that of a Han dynasty army general who had been given the important task of maintaining imperial frontier defenses. They took the bronzes to the museum in Lanzhou.

In Lanzhou, the group of bronzes was observed by Guo Moruo, China's elder statesman of archaeology and history, who was conducting Cambodian Prince Sihanouk on a tour of China. Guo was struck by the beauty of the horse and selected it for national and international exhibition.

Although scholars pointed out that the bird was not in fact a swallow, the piece was exhibited in many countries in the 1970s as "Galloping Horse Treading on a Flying Swallow."

In 1984, the China National Tourism Administration selected the sculpture as the national symbol of tourism in China. In 2002, the State Administration of Cultural Heritage of China included the Gansu Flying Horse in the inaugural list of 64 grade-one cultural relics that are forbidden to be taken out of mainland China for exhibition.

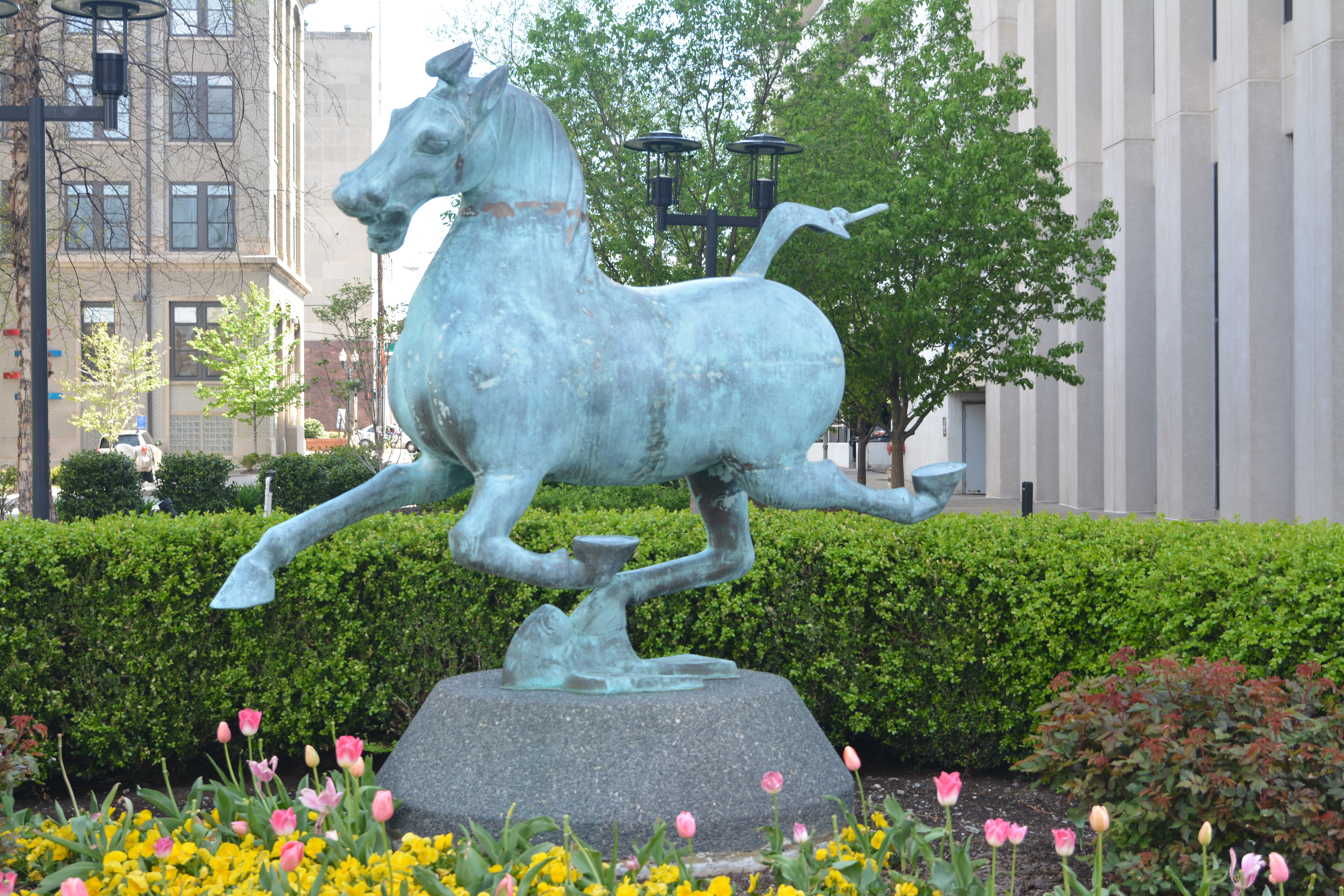
Flying Horse of Gansu replica in Lexington Kentucky USA

A bronze copy of the sculpture was presented as a gift by the Government of the People's Republic of China to the United Nations Office in Geneva, Switzerland, in 1987; it is displayed in the Palace of Nations. Another copy was donated to the city of Lexington, Kentucky, US, on June 15, 2000, by the City of Xi'an, China and Hao Bao Zhu, President, Five Rings International.
