= Gansu Provincial Museum =

Museum in Lanzhou, China

- 甘肃省博物馆
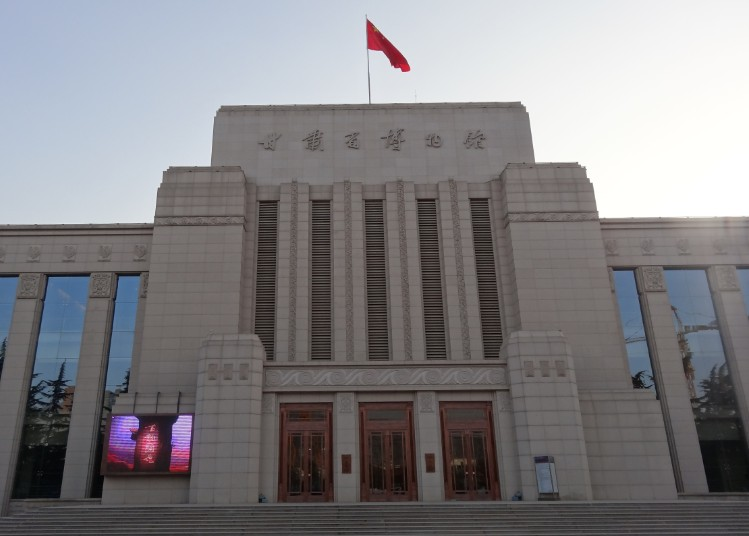
- The newly refurbished exhibition building

- Location within China
- Former name: Gansu Science and Education Museum
- Established: 1939
- Location: Lanzhou, Gansu Province, China
- Coordinates: 36.06109°N 103.83430°E
- Key holdings: Flying Horse of Gansu
- Collections: Silk Road, Neolithic, Natural Science
- Collection size: 355,364
- Director: E. Jun
- Website: www.gansumuseum.com English:

The Gansu Provincial Museum (simplified Chinese: 甘肃省博物馆; traditional Chinese: 甘肅省博物館; pinyin: Gānsù Shěng Bówùguǎn) is a museum in Lanzhou, China. Its collections include over 350,000 artefacts, in two main sections: history and natural science. Since its foundation, the museum has held almost 300 exhibitions, and items from its collections have been exhibited worldwide. The museum was originally only for the history of Gansu itself, but was re-purposed in 1956 to be a natural history museum, after three years of renovations.

== Exhibitions ==
A major holding of the museum is the Flying Horse of Gansu, a bronze sculpture from Eastern Han dynasty, around the 2nd century AD. Apart from this, the museum has permanent exhibitions on:

- Buddhist art
- Fossils and paleontology
- Painted pottery
- Silk Road civilization
- 'Red Gansu' (Communist Party during the Chinese Civil War)

== See also ==
- Gansu Flying Horse
- Silk Route Museum
